= Snipe, Texas =

- Unincorporated community
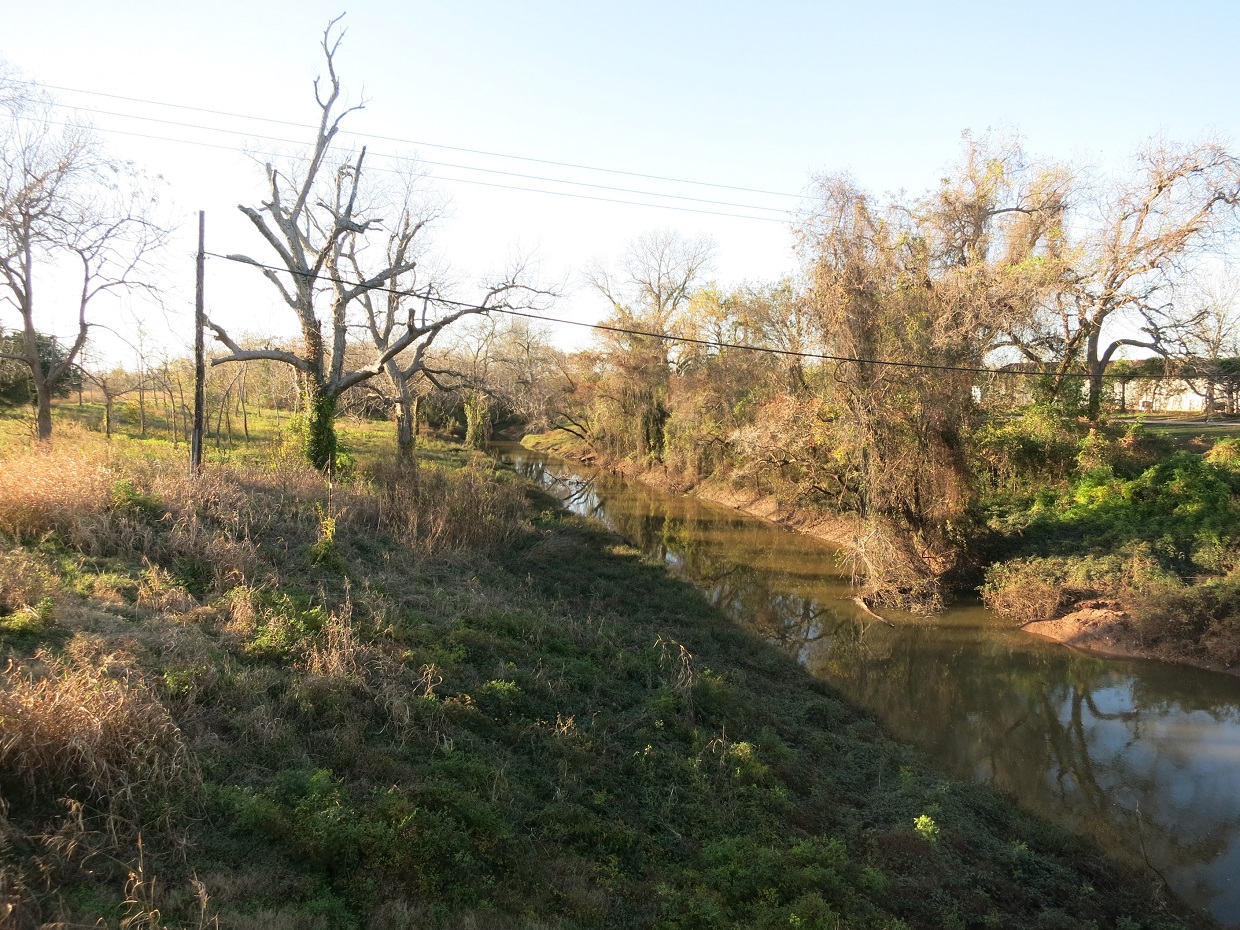
- Oyster Creek at the FM 290 bridge

- Location within the state of Texas Snipe (the United States)
- Coordinates: 29°07′25″N 95°28′56″W
- Country: United States
- State: Texas
- County: Brazoria
- Elevation: 30 ft (9.1 m)
- Time zone: UTC-6 (Central (CST))
  - Summer (DST): UTC-5 (CDT)
- ZIP codes: 77515
- Area code: 979
- GNIS feature ID: 1380567

Snipe is an unincorporated community in central Brazoria County, Texas, United States. It was formerly a distinct community. It is located within the Greater Houston metropolitan area.

== History ==
Raymond Weems, Snipe's first postmaster, named Snipe after a facetious reference made about the place by his father's hunting partner. Snipe was established in the former Ward Plantation area owned by Asa Mitchell. The St. Louis, Brownsville and Mexico Railway laid a track through the community around 1905. Locals wanted the station to be named after early settler Ed Matthews, but it was instead named Edmonds. A post office operated in Snipe from 1921 to 1949; the post office served the Retrieve Prison Farm (later the Wayne Scott Unit). A railroad bunkhouse and commissary were in operation in 1929. There was only one business and 15 residents in the early 1930s. The Ward Plantation was destroyed by a storm in 1932. Its population rose to 75 in 1970 and gained three more residents four years later, but seemingly disappeared in 1988.

== Geography ==
The location of Snipe is 3 miles (4.8 km) southwest of Angleton on the Union Pacific Railroad and Oyster Creek.

== Education ==
Today, the community is served by the Angleton Independent School District. Children in the area attend Westside Elementary School, Angleton Junior High School, and Angleton High School in Angleton.

== Burrell Chapel Church ==
The Burrell chapel church at Snipe, Texas, like many Black churches in the post-emancipation era, served as the foundation on which agents of civilization and institutions emerged in African American communities. In fact, it is the existence of these institutions that support the idea of Snipe's designation as a Freedom Colony. The church was originally built in 1867 at Snipe and was organized by Reverend Burrell. Oral history has it that the church building was used as a school on Monday to Friday for the education of black children. The church was also instrumental in the formation of the Burrell Chapel cemetery. The formation of these historical places owes their origin and organization to the remarkable ideologies on which the Burrell Chapel was formed and organized. According to Mrs. Loretta Granville Washington, the oldest member who has been with the Burrell Chapel for 70 years, the storm of 1932 blew down the Burrell Chapel church building at Snipe. Prior to this, the church often conducted weddings, funerals, and Sunday services in its historic building. It was also used as a school and a place for anything that would be classed as a civic opportunity. The Burrell Chapel moved to its present location off of Highway 35, on Easter Sunday, April 1999.

== Cemetery ==
Burrell Chapel Cemetery or Snipe Cemetery in Brazoria County, Texas, is one of those cemeteries that fall under the commission. This cemetery can be found in the Snipe community, precisely, on the property of Mr. Henry William Munson. A lot more people from the community were buried there. It was a cemetery for the Burrell Chapel Church hence the name Burrell Chapel Cemetery. Currently, it’s being preserved by the Brazoria Historic Cemeteries Guardianship Association. They have a list of 117 names of people buried down there and can only count 47 headstones. A few people buried at the cemetery include Perry Scoby (first person buried), Reverend A.B Marshall, J. Henry Hall (last person buried).

== Local and Descendant Groups' Connection to Snipe Today ==
Loretta Granville Washington, born to Georgia and Jesse Granville, is a long-serving member of Burrell Chapel Church in Snipe. She recalls her first visit to the Snipe cemetery at age 5 and her desire for its preservation. Local descendants, with the support of the Brazoria Historic Cemeteries Guardianship Association, are working to preserve the cemetery by allowing access to it and maintaining its good condition. They are also working to gather data on all individuals buried at the cemetery from Burrell Chapel Church and local gardeners. Currently, Mr. Ronald Higgins owns 18 acres of land in Snipe that belonged to his grandfather years ago.
