= Hinkle's Ferry, Texas =

Unincorporated community in Brazoria County, Texas, United States

Hinkles Ferry, Texas
- Unincorporated community
- Location within Texas Location within the United States
- Coordinates: 28°56′59″N 95°33′27″W
- Country: United States
- State: Texas
- County: Brazoria
- Elevation: 10 ft (3.0 m)
- Time zone: UTC-6 (Central (CST))
  - Summer (DST): UTC-5 (CDT)
- Area code: 979
- GNIS feature ID: 2034569

Hinkle's Ferry is an unincorporated community in Brazoria County, Texas, United States. According to the Handbook of Texas, the community had a population of 35 in 2000. It is located within the Greater Houston metropolitan area.

== Geography ==
Hinkles Ferry is located near the San Bernard River, 6 mi (9.7 km) south of Brazoria in southwestern Brazoria County. It was established around an old ferry crossing just north of where Farm to Market Road 310 used to cross the river.

== Education ==
In 1896, Hinkle's Ferry had a school with one teacher and 11 students. Today, the community is served by the Angleton Independent School District. Children in the area attend Rancho Isabella Elementary School, Angleton Junior High School, and Angleton High School in Angleton.

== See also ==
- List of unincorporated communities in Texas
