= Lake Barbara, Texas =

- Ghost town
- Location within Texas Location within the United States
- Coordinates: 29°1′31″N 95°23′22″W
- Country: United States
- State: Texas
- County: Brazoria
- Elevation: 10 ft (3.0 m)
- Time zone: UTC-6 (Central (CST))
  - Summer (DST): UTC-5 (CDT)
- Area code: 979
- GNIS feature ID: 1360834

Lake Barbara is a ghost town in Brazoria County, Texas, United States. It is located within the Greater Houston metropolitan area.

== History ==
The community became a part of Brazosport sometime after 1944. It was incorporated as Lake Barbara Village in August 1954 and adopted home-rule charter status in 1957. Its population was 477, with four businesses in 1961. Five years later, the population grew to 500 and reached its high water mark of 625 in 1974. Two years later, it became a part of the Clute city limits, the city of which it was originally a part.

== Geography ==
Lake Barbara was located near a lake of the same name as well as on the Missouri Pacific Railroad line east of Texas State Highway 288, 10 miles (16 km) south of Angleton in southeastern Brazoria County.

== Education ==
Today, Lake Barbara is located within the Brazosport Independent School District.
