= Anchor, Texas =

Unincorporated community in Brazoria County, Texas, United States

- Unincorporated community
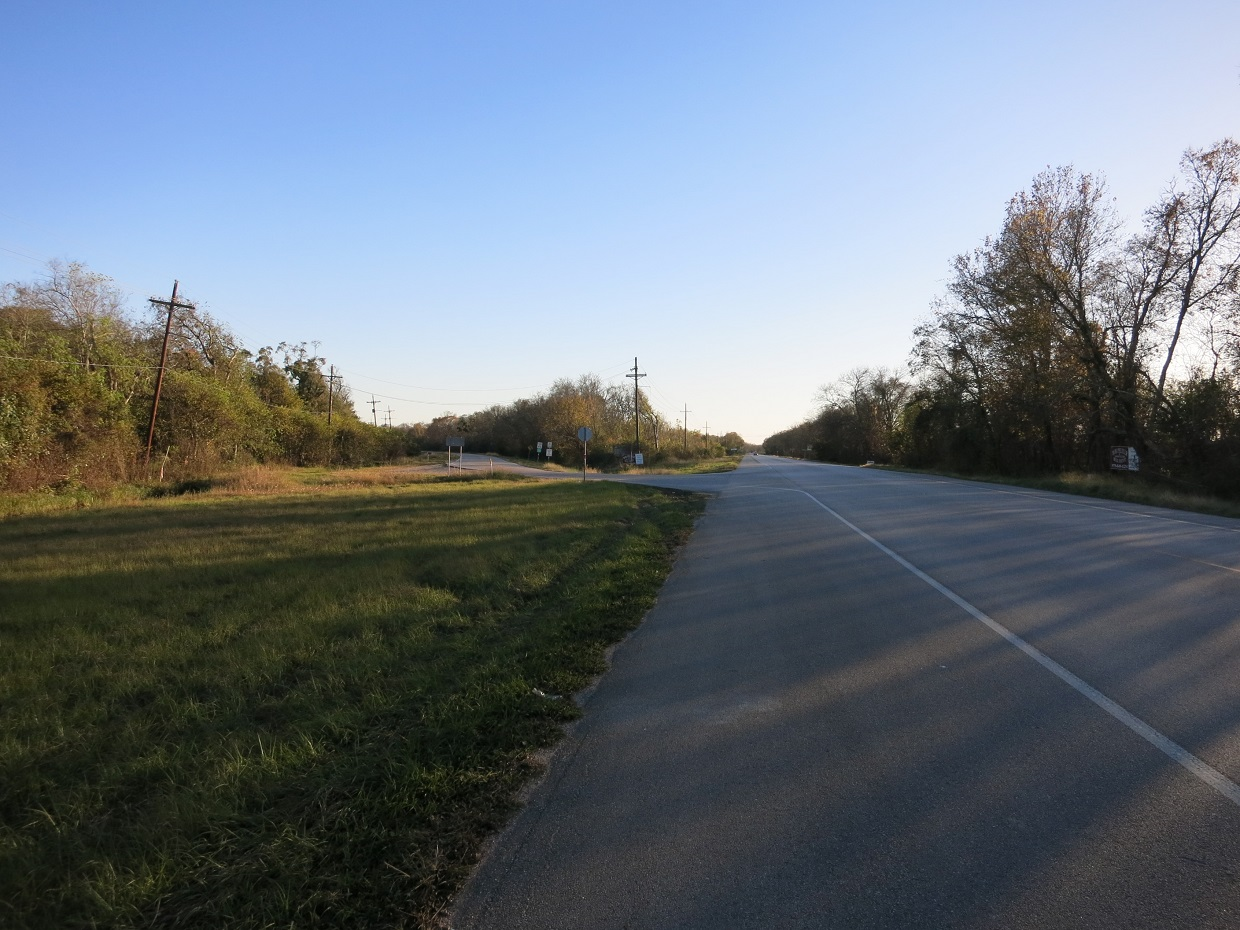
- The intersection of FM 521 and County 44 (at left), once an important railroad intersection.

- Location within Texas Location within the United States
- Coordinates: 29°12′30″N 95°28′24″W
- Country: United States
- State: Texas
- County: Brazoria
- Elevation: 36 ft (11 m)
- Time zone: UTC-6 (Central (CST))
  - Summer (DST): UTC-5 (CDT)
- Area code: 979
- GNIS feature ID: 1351088

Anchor is an unincorporated community in central Brazoria County, Texas, United States. It is located within the Greater Houston metropolitan area.

== History ==
The community may have been named for a local cattle brand; it may also have been named after Anchor, Illinois, the native home of an early settler.

An episode of The Dick Van Dyke Show, number 146, entitled "Remember the Alimony", was set in Anchor. In the episode, the town was moved to very near the Mexican border and given an army base.

== Geography ==
Anchor is located at the intersection of Farm to Market Road 521 and County Road 44, 4 miles (6.4 km) northwest of Angleton.

== Education ==
Anchor once had its own school. Today, the community is served by the Angleton Independent School District. Children in the area attend Rancho Isabella Elementary School, Angleton Junior High School, and Angleton High School in Angleton.

== See also ==
- List of unincorporated communities in Texas
