= China Grove =

China Grove may refer to:

== Towns and cities ==
- China Grove, Alabama
- China Grove, North Carolina
- China Grove, Texas, a suburb of San Antonio
- China Grove, Brazoria County, Texas, an unincorporated community

== Historic sites ==
- China Grove (Gardner, Louisiana), listed on the NRHP in Louisiana
- China Grove (Lorman, Mississippi), listed on the NRHP in Mississippi
- China Grove Plantation, Natchez, Mississippi, listed on the NRHP in Mississippi
- China Grove (Oriental, North Carolina), listed on the NRHP in North Carolina
- China Grove (Georgetown County, South Carolina), formerly listed on the NRHP in South Carolina

== Other ==
- "China Grove" (song), a song on The Doobie Brothers' 1973 album The Captain and Me
