= China Grove, Brazoria County, Texas =

- Unincorporated community
- Location within Texas Location within the United States
- Coordinates: 29°18′46″N 95°27′24″W
- Country: United States
- State: Texas
- County: Brazoria
- Elevation: 46 ft (14 m)
- Time zone: UTC-6 (Central (CST))
  - Summer (DST): UTC-5 (CDT)
- Area code: 979
- GNIS feature ID: 1379540

China Grove is an unincorporated community in northwestern Brazoria County, Texas, United States. It is a part of the Greater Houston metropolitan area.

== History ==
China Grove was named for a plantation constructed by Warren D. C. Hall and later owned by Albert Sidney Johnston and Albert T. Burnley. It was named for a cluster of chinaberry trees planted for shade. Hall also grew figs and oranges. China Grove was a station on the Columbia Tap Railroad from sometime before 1877, until the town of Custer was established in 1892. There were several scattered dwellings in the community in 1974. The only remnants of the plantation are several hedges of the Cherokee rose in 1991 and a cemetery.

== Geography ==
China Grove is located 2 mi (3.2 km) south of Rosharon, 12 mi (19 km) north of Angleton, and west of Texas State Highway 288. It is also located 29 mi (47 km) north of Freeport and 33 mi (53 km) south of Houston.

== Education ==
China Grove had two separate schools; one had 87 black students in 1896, with another black school having 108 students and two teachers in 1906. It also had a school with 7 white students and one teacher. It became a school district in 1947. Today, the community is served by the Angleton Independent School District. Children in the area attend Frontier Elementary School, Angleton Junior High School, and Angleton High School in Angleton.
