= Bryan Beach, Texas =

- Unincorporated community
- Location within Texas Location within the United States
- Coordinates: 28°52′59.90″N 95°22′43″W
- Country: United States
- State: Texas
- County: Brazoria
- Elevation: 3 ft (0.91 m)
- Time zone: UTC-6 (Central (CST))
  - Summer (DST): UTC-5 (CDT)
- Area code: 979
- GNIS feature ID: 2034487

Bryan Beach is an unincorporated community in Brazoria County, Texas, United States. According to the Handbook of Texas, the community had a population of 14 in 2000. It is located within the Greater Houston metropolitan area.

== History ==
Bryan Beach was most likely named for local landowner James Perry Bryan during the second half of the 20th century. It served fishermen and beachgoers. Bryan Beach State Recreation Area is located a couple of miles down the beach and opened in 1973. No businesses were operating in the community, but it did have 14 residents in 2000.

== Geography ==
Bryan Beach is located on Farm to Market Road 1495, 4 miles (6.4 km) south of Freeport on the Gulf of Mexico in southern Brazoria County.

== Education ==
Bryan Beach is served by the Brazosport Independent School District.
