= K9s4COPs =

K9s.org, formerly, K9s4COPs Inc.
- Founded: June 2010 in Houston, Texas
- Type: 501(c)(3)
- Headquarters: College Station, Texas
- Executive Director: Dana P. Baker
- Key people: Kristi Hoss Schiller (Founder & Board Chair)
- Website: https://k9s.org/

K9s.org, formerly K9s4COPs is the organization founded in June 2010 by Kristi Schiller of Houston, Texas, to raise charitable funds to donate K9s to law enforcement agencies and school districts across the nation.

== History ==
On December 23, 2009, Schiller was at home in Houston watching the news when a story about Harris County Precinct 4 Deputy Constable Ted Dahlin and K9 Blek, a Czech-German shepherd came on. Blek had been killed in the line of duty after pursuing burglary suspects into a wooded area in north Houston.

The deputy had responded to a late afternoon burglary call on December 22, 2009, and released Blek to track the suspects, unfortunately, they managed to kill Blek before being apprehended. Later that evening five suspects were arrested in connection with the burglary and death of the K9.

Schiller proceeded to research K9 partnerships in law enforcement agencies and found, due to budget cuts, there was no money for additional K9s. In Houston, and surrounding Harris County, there were a number of trained K9 officers on patrol without K9s. "She saw a need after seeing a story on the news and jumped to our rescue," Sheriff Garcia said about Schiller.

On March 25, 2011, K9s4COPs received its 501(c)(3) nonprofit, tax-exempt status after filing their certification of formation on June 22, 2010.

K9s cost between $15,000–$45,000 per dog, and most agencies struggle when budgeting for the purchase of a K9. What most departments can budget for however, is the required care, training and transportation of a K9.

K9s4COPs was founded to bridge this gap and ensure that K9 cost never keeps an Officer from having their K9 partner.

== Mission ==
Founded in 2010, K9s4COPs is a 501(c)(3) nonprofit foundation whose mission is to ensure that every law enforcement officer in need of a K9 has one at their side, trained and ready for service. K9s4COPs has placed highly skilled canines with law enforcement agencies in Texas and across the United States. These K9s have aided in the capture of criminal suspects, the confiscation of several million dollars of narcotics and in the life-saving protection of law enforcement officers.

== K9s4KIDs ==
K9s4KIDs

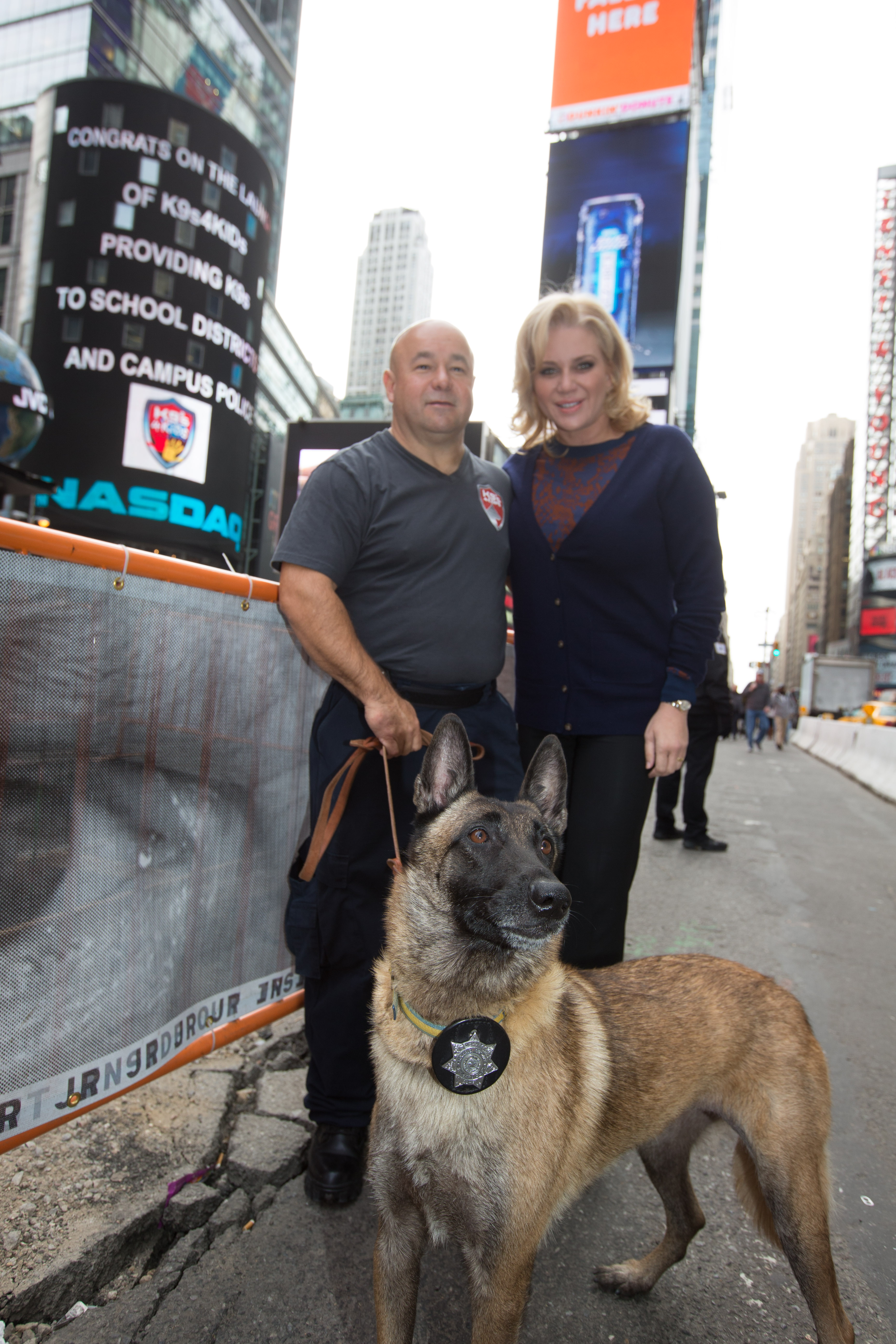
Harris County Sheriff's Office Sgt. Mike Thomas, K9s4COPs advisory board member, Kristi Schiller, K9s4COPs founder and board chair, and K9 Tamara, one of the original four K9s gifted by K9s4COPs. The three stand in Times Square with the NASDAQ sign in the background announcing the launch of K9s4KIDs.

Launched as an initiative of K9s4COPs, K9s4KIDs will help provide school districts and college campus police by providing selected schools with a safety dog, free of charge.

Fifteen school districts already have K9 officers thanks to K9s4COPs, Aldine ISD received two K9s, Ace and Smafu, and put them to work helping keep their schools drug-free in August 2012. Angleton Independent School District also received K9 Balhe trained in narcotics searches to help keep a drug-free learning environment. Texas A&M University has 3 K9s from K9s4KIDs, K9 Jackie, K9 Tyson, and K9 Mays.

=== Mission ===
Launched in November 2013, K9s4KIDs has made it their mission to support school districts and college campus police with K9s trained and ready for service. Founder, Kristi Schiller hopes that K9s4KIDs will be able to do for schools, what K9s4COPs has done for police departments. Recent school shootings spurred on the creation of K9s4KIDs, along with suggestions from K9s4COPs applicants.

== K9s Granted ==
On April 5, 2011, K9s4COPs made their first donations of four K9s to the Harris County Sheriff's Office K9 Unit in Houston, Texas. The K9s include Boomer and Mikey, dual-purpose K9s trained in narcotics searches and patrols, along with Fozzie and Tamara (shown on the left), K9s used for narcotics searches. To date, K9s4COPs has donated over 200 K9s all across the United States and Paris, France.

Since 2011 K9s donated by K9s4COPs have confiscated more than 10,000 firearms, over $360 million in narcotics and cash gained through illicit criminal activity. K9s4COPs police K9s have also participated in 6,500 arrests and helped keep the peace in over 4,000 public demonstrations.

=== First K9 Roll Call ===
In 2012, K9s4COPs established their quarterly K9 Roll Call to announce the K9s they would be granting to varying agencies across the nation. For their first anniversary K9s4COPs announced they would be awarding 10 K9s in the Houston area. Harris County Sheriff's Office K9 Unit was awarded six K9s trained in narcotics searches and patrols. One K9 trained in narcotics was awarded to Harris County Constable Precinct 4 K9 Unit. K9s Brody, Hyro and Moja were awarded to the Houston Police Department K9 Unit, two of the K9s are trained for patrol and one in explosives searches.

=== 2013 First Quarter K9 Roll Call ===
K9s4COPs started their first quarter off with the announcement that they would be granting six dual-purpose K9s to six different agencies. Harris County Precinct 1, Harris County Sheriff's Office, the Pasadena Police Department in Pasadena, Texas, Missouri City Police Department in Missouri City, Texas, and Goodhue County Sheriff's Department in Red Wing, Minn., all received K9s trained for narcotics searches and patrol, while the Houston Metro Police Department's K9 is trained for explosives searches and patrol.

=== 2013 Second Quarter K9 Roll Call ===
For their second quarter, K9s4COPs announced they would be granting six K9s to four agencies. Daviess County Sheriff's Office in Owensboro, Ky., received a dual-purpose narcotics K9 and Harris County Sheriff's Office received three dual-purpose K9s. Eagle Lake Police Department in Eagle Lake, Texas, received a K9 trained for narcotics searches. Cambria County Sheriff's Office in Ebensburg, Pa., received a K9 after having to retire their own K9, Alli, who was suffering from health ailments.

=== 2013 Third Quarter K9 Roll Call ===
The third quarter roll call announced the granting of six K9s to six different agencies across the nation. The Roberta Police Department in Roberta, Ga., the Hubbard Police Department in Hubbard, Ore., and the Ellis County Sheriff's Office in Waxahachie, Texas, each received a K9 trained in narcotics and patrol. The City of Conroe Police Department in Conroe, Texas, and Angleton Independent School District Police Department in Angleton, Texas, both received a K9 trained in narcotics searches. Harris County Precinct 4 Constables Office received a dual-purpose K9 trained in patrol and explosive detection.

== Events ==
=== Annual Fundraisers ===
On Thursday October 27, 2011, K9s4COPs held what would become its annual fundraiser. The 2011 Howl-Oween Fundraiser was hosted by John and Kristi Schiller at their home and collected $500,000 in donations.

On September 20, 2012, K9s4COPs held their second annual fundraiser at El Real Tex Mex Cafe, where they had more than 300 attendees. The event was hosted by Kristi Schiller and executive board member, Judge Robert Eckles.

The third annual fundraiser, Unleashed 2013, was held on October 22, 2013, at Hughes Hangar and hosted by Kristi Schiller and Mayor Annise Parker. Unleashed was able to raise more than $460,000 for the foundations. The event kept with the canine theme and guests were offered goody bags of dog cookies and auction packages came with custom dog collars and leashes.

The 2019 Unleashed gala will take place on October 22, 2019, at Goode Armadillo Co. Palace.

=== Rose Parade ===
On January 1, 2014, K9s4COPs participated in the 125th Tournament of Roses Parade. At the 2013 Rose Parade there were an estimated 700,000 in attendance.

=== Texas K9 Olympics ===
Officially the Texas K9s Officers Conference & Trials, the K9 Olympics were held October 23–25, 2013 at the Harris County Sheriff's Office Training Facility.

== Awards ==
=== Humanitarian Service Award ===
In December 2012, K9s4COPs was honored by the Houston Police Department and awarded a Humanitarian Service Award after awarding the department three K9s in February.

=== Hero Dog Awards ===
Officially the American Humane Association Hero Dog Awards, Hero Dog Awards are given to dogs that have contributed to society. K9s4COPs received a $5,000 award from the American Humane Association in late 2012 after K9 Jynx from Shillington, Pa., won in his category of Law Enforcement and Arson Dogs, and had K9s4COPs as his charity partner.

K9 Flash won in her category of Law Enforcement and Arson Dogs in the American Humane Hero Dog Awards, and won $2,500 for her charity partner, K9s4COPs.
