= Brazosport College =

Community college in Lake Jackson, Texas, U.S.

Coordinates: 29.044786°N 95.407907°W

- Former name: Brazosport Junior College (1968–1970)
- Motto: The College of Choice
- Type: Public community college
- Established: 1968
- Affiliations: SACS
- President: Dr. Vincent R. Solis
- Faculty: 166
- Students: 3,829 (Fall 2021)
- Location: Lake Jackson, Texas, United States
- Campus: Suburban, 156 acres (.63 km^{2})
- Colors: Black, Blue, and White
- Nickname: Gators
- Website: brazosport.edu

Brazosport College (BC) is a public community college in Lake Jackson, Texas. The college opened in 1968 and offers primarily associate degrees and some bachelor's degrees. The campus features The Clarion, a regional musical performance venue, in addition to the Brazosport Center for the Arts and Sciences which houses the Brazosport Museum of Natural Science, the Brazosport Planetarium and other institutions.

As defined by the Texas Legislature, the official service area of Brazosport College is the Brazosport, Columbia-Brazoria, Damon, and Sweeny school districts, and the Angleton Independent School District excluding that portion annexed by Alvin Community College prior to September 1, 1995. The service area includes most of Lake Jackson, Clute, Freeport, Jones Creek, Oyster Creek, Quintana, Richwood, and Surfside Beach.

== History ==
In 1948, voters of the Brazosport Independent School District voted to create the Brazosport Junior College District. However, not until the summer of 1967, after a tax was authorized by voters to maintain the college, was the college actually built. In the fall of 1968, the college opened as Brazosport Junior College, and the first semester of classes began with an enrollment of 868 students. Classes were held at the Brazosport Education Extension Center in Freeport, Texas.

In 1970, Brazosport Junior College graduated its first 25 students. That same year, Brazosport Junior College was renamed to Brazosport College to represent a broader vision for the school.

On June 20, 2003, then-Texas Governor Rick Perry signed Senate Bill 286 into law, which allowed the Texas Higher Education Coordinating Board to choose Brazosport College, Midland College, and South Texas College to offer baccalaureate degrees. In December 2004, Brazosport College received accreditation from the Southern Association of Colleges and Schools as a baccalaureate-level institution. In fall of 2005, Brazosport College began offering classes for its Bachelor of Applied Technology degree program for the first time.

In 2011, Brazosport College, along with Frank Phillips College in Borger, Ranger College in Ranger, and Odessa College in Odessa, were proposed for closure by the State of Texas. The Texas Association of Community Colleges rallied successfully to keep the four institutions open.

In July 2014, Brazosport College expanded its baccalaureate programs by adding the Health Management Services major to its Bachelor of Applied Technology degree program.

In July 2021, Brazosport College received a $3 million gift from philanthropist MacKenzie Scott in recognition to their service to minority communities.

=== List of Brazosport College presidents ===
- J. R. Jackson, 1968–1978
- W. A. Bass, 1978–1988
- John R. Grable, 1988–1996
- Millicent Valek, 1996–2021
- Vincent Solis, 2022–present

== Academics ==
There are several divisions that comprise the college as follows:

- Division of Communication & Fine Arts
- Division of Computer Technology & Office Administration
- Division of Construction and Mechanical Technologies
- Division of Mathematics & Life Sciences
- Division of Physical Sciences & Process Technologies
- Division of Social Sciences & Business
- Department of Transitional Education

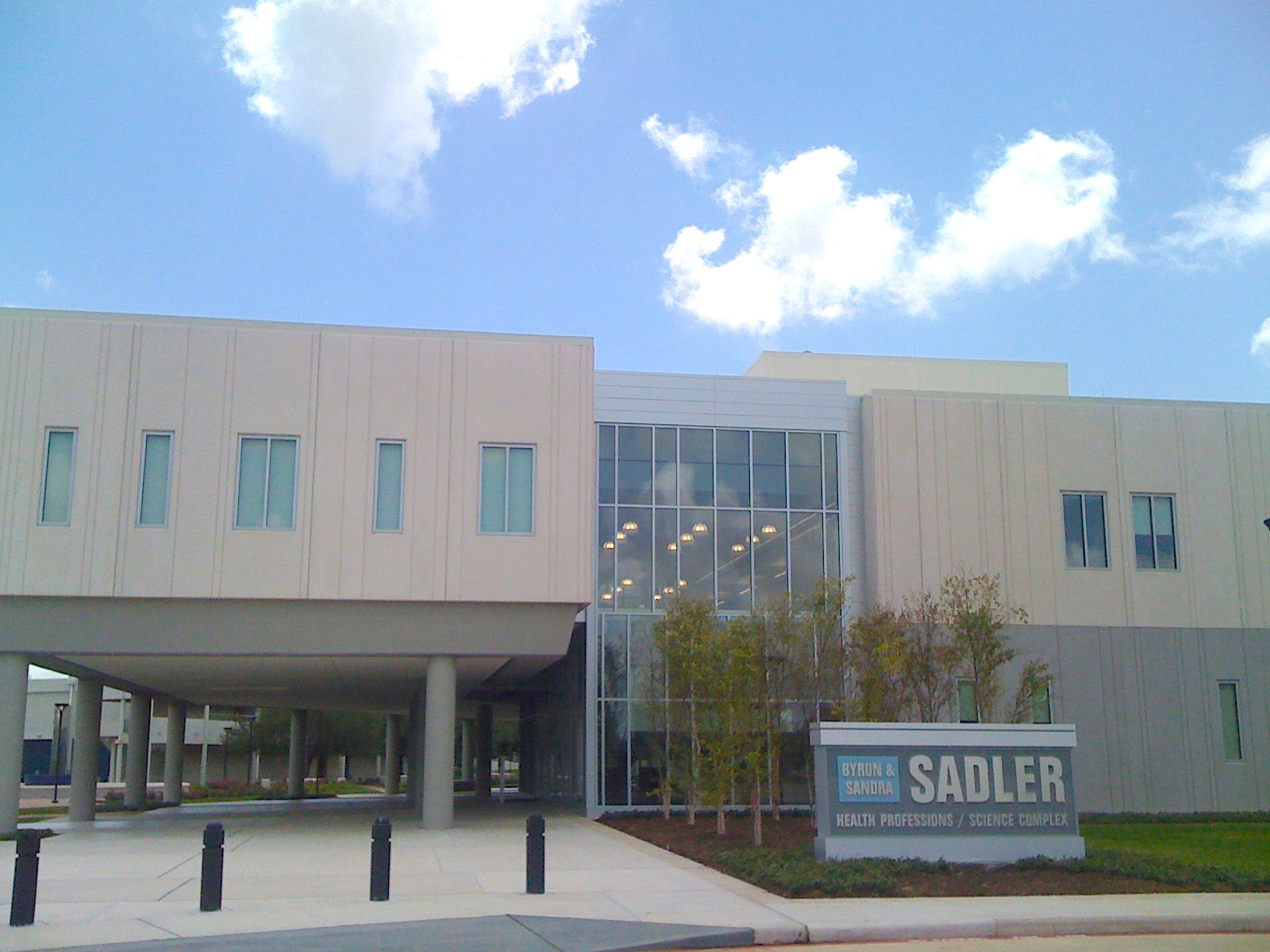
The Byron & Sandra Sadler Health Professions/Science Complex

=== Associate degrees and transfer programs ===
Students at BC have the option to pursue several educational paths. Historically, most students have opted to attend classes at Brazosport College as a stepping stone to other colleges and universities that offer bachelor's degrees. BC participates in the Texas Common Course Numbering System, or TCCNS, a voluntary cooperative effort by many Texas colleges and universities to create a standard set of course designations for transfer students at the freshman and sophomore level. This allows students who wish to transfer courses taken at Brazosport College to take a relevant curriculum for their destination school.

Another option for students at BC is to pursue an associate degree. Brazosport College generally graduates around 200 students annually.

=== Bachelor's degree ===
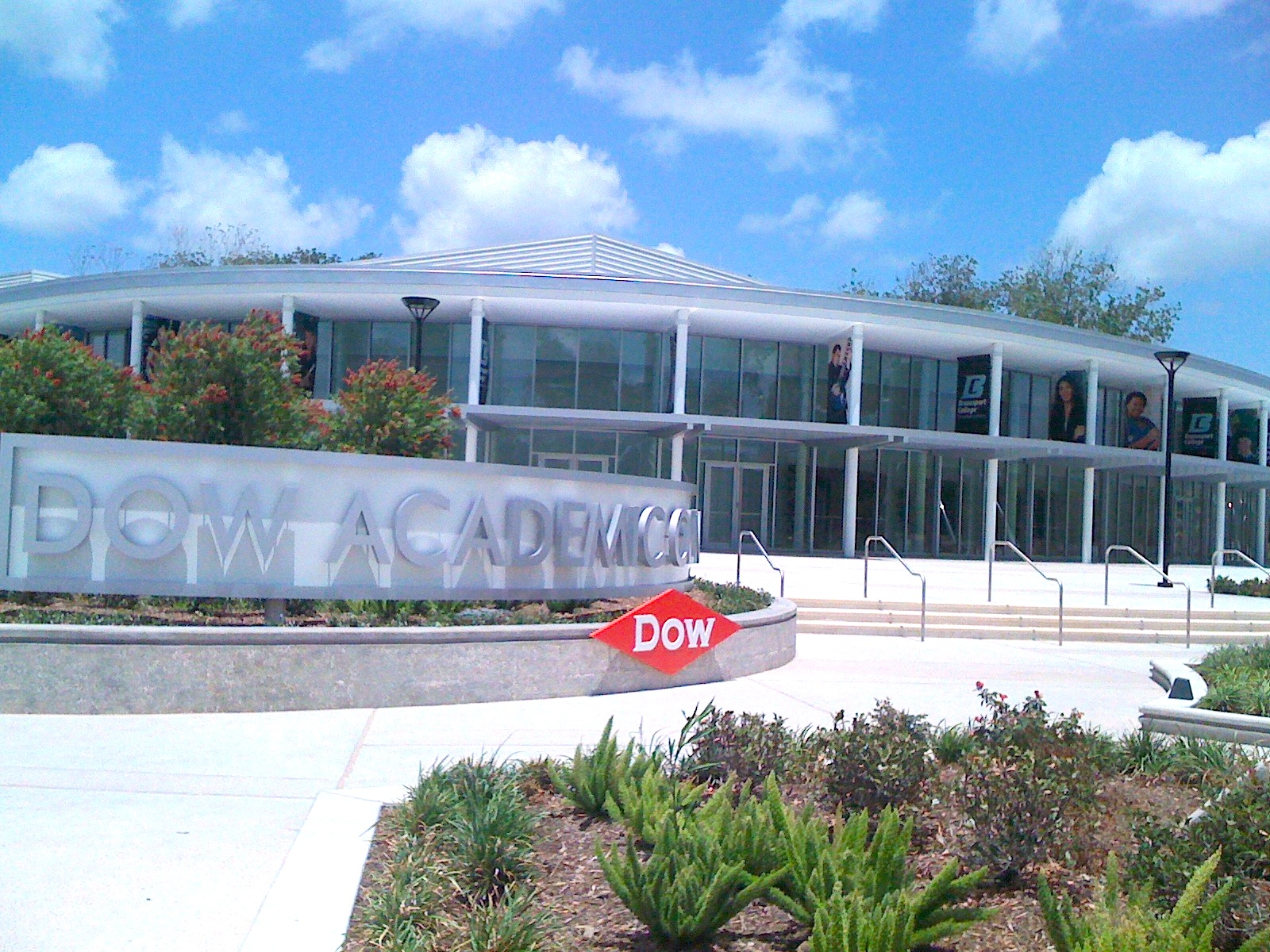
Dow Academic Center

A third option for students at BC is to pursue a Bachelor's degree in the school's Bachelor of Applied Technology program. Students in this program must be admitted through a separate application process.

== Campus ==
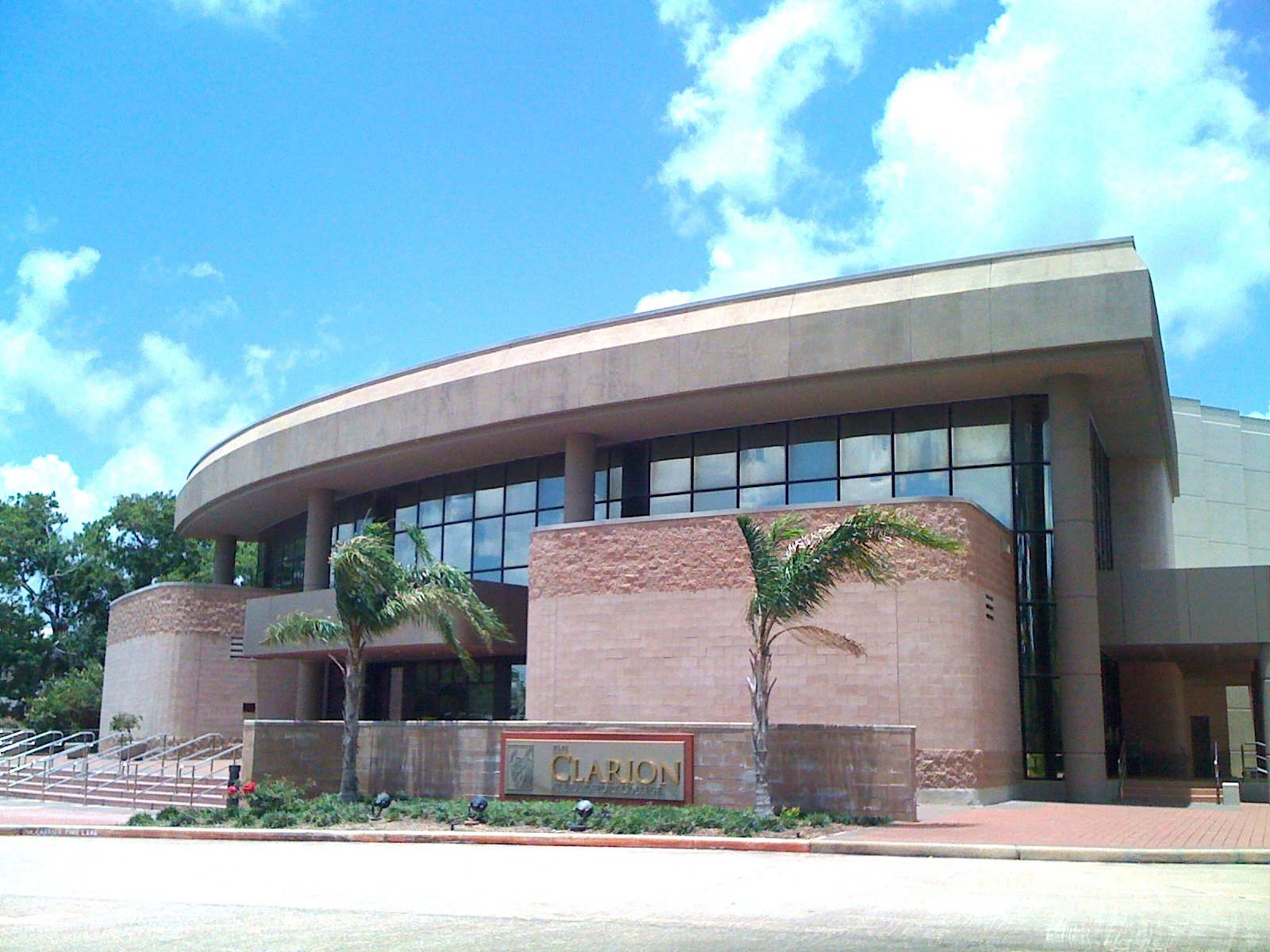
The Clarion

Brazosport College as a campus is nearly 160 acres (0.65 km^{2}) in size. It is a fully commuter-based campus, as there are no housing facilities for students. Most classes are held in a central complex.

=== Facilities ===
Brazosport College is home to The Clarion — a 29,000-square-foot (2,700 m^{2}) performance hall that seats 600 people. The $7.36 million facility opened in October 2005. Notable artists that have performed at The Clarion include singer-songwriters Don McLean, Lyle Lovett, David Sanborn, Aaron Neville, Christopher Cross, Vince Gill, Rick Springfield, and Los Lonely Boys. The Clarion has had only one administrator since its construction, Vorin Dornan.

The Brazosport Center for the Arts and Sciences, a 45,000-square-foot (4,200 m^{2}) facility, is located directly in front of Brazosport College. Hosted by the college, the Brazosport Center for the Arts and Sciences is an independent nonprofit corporation. The center houses Brazosport Center Stages, an art studio and gallery, The Brazosport Museum of Natural Science along with a nature center and planetarium.

BC has a student activity center known as "The Swamp". Students can play pool, table tennis, and participate in other activities. The college also has a central dining facility that serves meals throughout the day to visitors, students, and staff and faculty.

== Student life ==
Brazosport College's Student Senate are elected and represent the student body's interests. Other activities for students include a fencing club and a performing drama group.

== Notable alumni ==
- Candace Duval, class of 1981, former Democratic nominee to the U.S. House of Representatives
- Robert Ellis, last attended in 2006, singer-songwriter
