= Lochridge, Texas =

- Unincorporated community
- Location within the state of Texas Lochridge (the United States)
- Coordinates: 29°21′11″N 95°31′52″W
- Country: United States
- State: Texas
- County: Brazoria
- Elevation: 46 ft (14 m)
- Time zone: UTC-6 (Central (CST))
  - Summer (DST): UTC-5 (CDT)
- ZIP codes: 77583
- Area codes: 281, 832
- GNIS feature ID: 1380093

Lochridge is an unincorporated community located in Brazoria County, Texas, United States. It formerly had a distinct community. It is located within the Greater Houston metropolitan area.

== History ==
Lochridge began with a farm and a grocery store. A post office was established at Lochridge in 1913, with Blackburn Lochridge as postmaster. He later built a gin and sent telephone service to the area and died in 1929. His son Tom maintained the only business in the area until his mother died and moved to Rosharon. There were several scattered houses in the area, alongside the post office, in the 1930s. Lochridge no longer found representation in the Census by 1950.

== Geography ==
Lochridge is located on Texas State Highway 1462, west of Rosharon in northwestern Brazoria County.

== Education ==
Angleton Independent School District operates schools in the area. Children in the area attend Frontier Elementary School, Angleton Junior High School, and Angleton High School in Angleton.

== Media ==
KGOW has a daytime transmitter in Lochridge, across from Brazos Bend State Park.

== Gallery ==
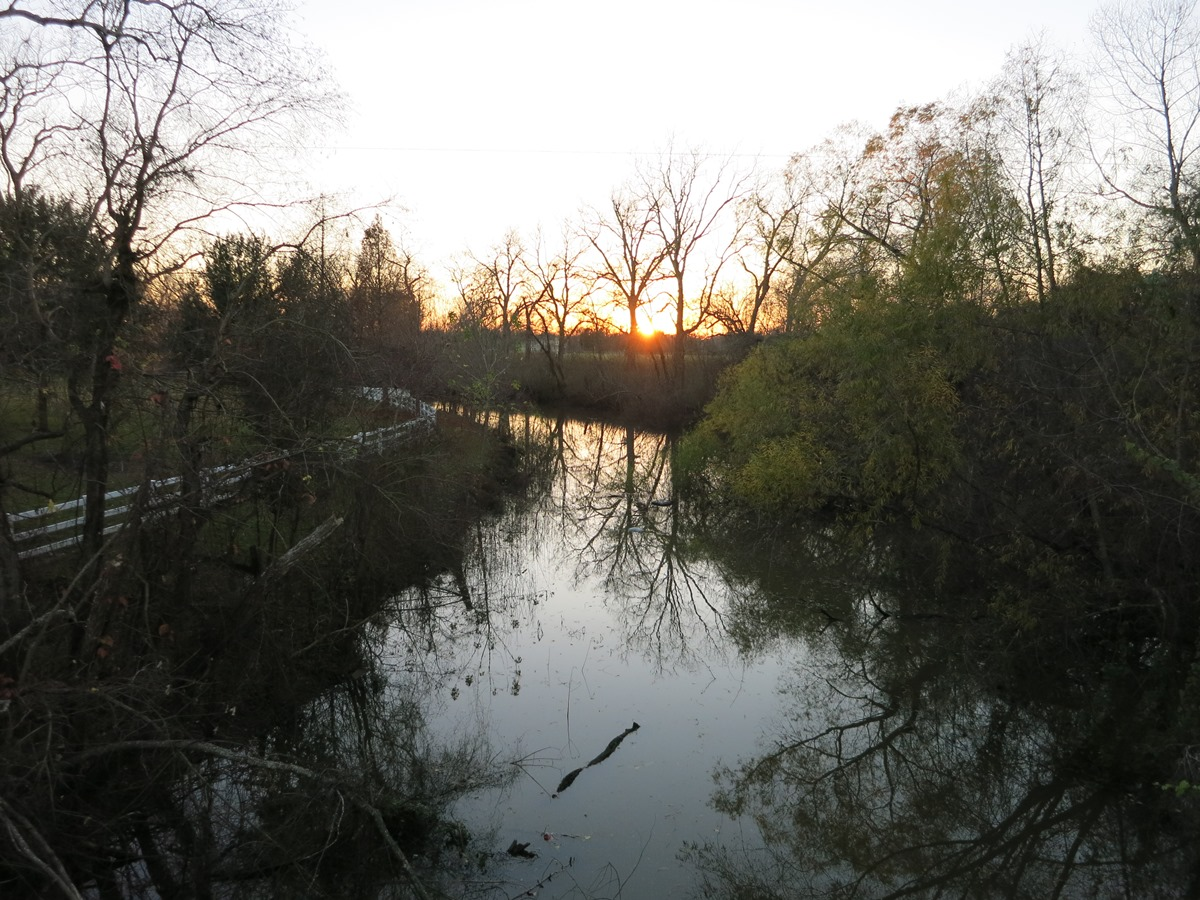
Sunset over Oyster Creek at the County Road 569 bridge
