= Four Corners, Brazoria County, Texas =

- Unincorporated community
- Location within Texas Location within the United States
- Coordinates: 29°0′7″N 95°38′44″W
- Country: United States
- State: Texas
- County: Brazoria
- Elevation: 26 ft (7.9 m)
- Time zone: UTC-6 (Central (CST))
  - Summer (DST): UTC-5 (CDT)
- Area code: 979
- GNIS feature ID: 2034923

Four Corners is an unincorporated community in Brazoria County, Texas, United States. It is located within the Greater Houston metropolitan area.

== History ==
Maps showed several houses, farms, a few businesses, and a church in the area in 1936. There was a business located at the crossroads as late as the 1990s.

== Geography ==
Four Corners is located at the four-way intersection of Farm to Market Roads 524 and 521, 5 miles (8.0 km) southwest of Brazoria in southwestern Brazoria County, near the Matagorda County line.

== Education ==
Four Corners is served by the Sweeny Independent School District.
