= Quintana, Texas =

- Town
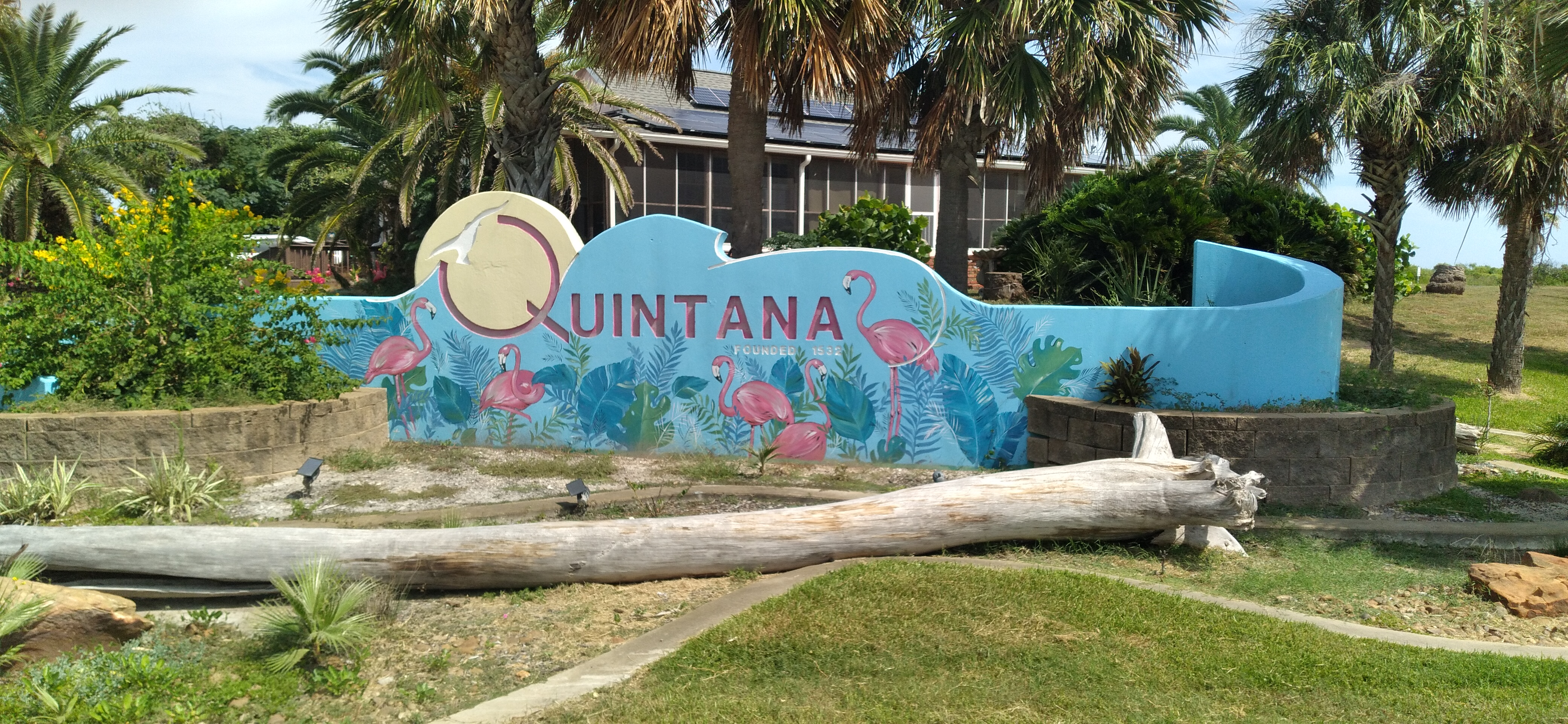
- Welcome Sign in Quintana

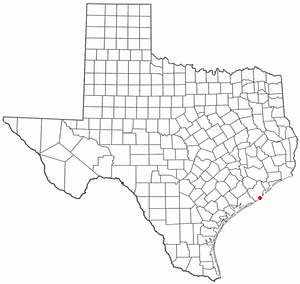
- Location of Quintana, Texas

- Coordinates: 28°56′00″N 95°18′30″W
- Country: United States
- State: Texas
- County: Brazoria

Area
  - Total: 2.39 sq mi (6.19 km^{2})
  - Land: 0.69 sq mi (1.79 km^{2})
  - Water: 1.69 sq mi (4.39 km^{2})
- Elevation: 7 ft (2.1 m)

Population (2020)
  - Total: 26
  - Density: 136/sq mi (52.4/km^{2})
- Time zone: UTC-6 (Central (CST))
  - Summer (DST): UTC-5 (CDT)
- ZIP code: 77541
- Area code: 979
- FIPS code: 48-60164
- GNIS feature ID: 1380409
- Website: http://www.quintanatx.org

Quintana is a town in Brazoria County, Texas, United States. Its population was 26 as of the 2020 census, down from 56 at the 2010 census.

== Geography ==
Quintana is located in southern Brazoria County on Quintana Beach along the Gulf of Mexico. It is bordered by the city of Surfside Beach to the northeast, across the entrance to Freeport Harbor, and by the city of Freeport to the southwest in the area of Bryan Beach. The Intracoastal Waterway on the northwest separates Quintana from the main portion of Freeport.

According to the United States Census Bureau, the town of Quintana has a total area of 2.0 square miles (5.2 km^{2}), of which 0.66 square miles (1.7 km^{2}) are land and 1.4 square miles (3.5 km^{2}), or 67.87%, are covered by water.

=== Climate ===
The climate in this area is characterized by hot, humid summers and generally mild to cool winters. According to the Köppen climate classification, Quintana has a humid subtropical climate, Cfa on climate maps.

== Demographics ==
Historical population
Census	Pop.	Note	%±
1880	47		—
1890	475		910.6%
1900	301		−36.6%
1970	58		—
1980	30		−48.3%
1990	51		70.0%
2000	38		−25.5%
2010	56		47.4%
2020	26		−53.6%
U.S. Decennial Census

As of the census of 2000, 38 people, 20 households, and 11 families were residing in the town. The population density was 62.6 inhabitants per square mile (24.2/km^{2}). The 41 housing units averaged 67.6 per mi^{2} (26.0/km^{2}). The racial makeup of the town was 84.21% White, and 15.79% from two or more races. Hispanics or Latinos of any race were 15.79% of the population.

Of 20 households, 10.0% had children under the age of 18 living with them, 40.0% were married couples living together, 5.0% had a female householder with no husband present, and 45.0% were not families. About 25.0% of all households were made up of individuals, and 10.0% had someone living alone who was 65 years of age or older. The average household size was 1.90 and the average family size was 2.18.

In the town, the age distribution was 10.5% under 18, 5.3% from 18 to 24, 26.3% from 25 to 44, 42.1% from 45 to 64, and 15.8% who were 65 or older. The median age was 48 years. For every 100 females, there were 171.4 males. For every 100 females age 18 and over, there were 142.9 males.

The median income for a household in the town was $25,500, and for a family was $11,875. Males had a median income of $27,500 versus $14,688 for females. The per capita income for the town was $15,900. About 25.0% of families and 18.2% of the population were living below the poverty line, with none under 18 or over 64.

== Education ==
The city is served by Brazosport Independent School District.

- Freeport Elementary School (grades Pre-K–1)
- Velasco Elementary School (grades 2–4)
- Lanier Middle School (grades 5–6)
- Freeport Intermediate School (grades 7–8)
- Brazosport High School (grades 9–12)

It was previously zoned to O.A. Fleming Elementary School (Pre-K–1), and Jane Long Elementary School (grades 2–4). Jane Long was scheduled to close in 2017, with Fleming taking grades K–1 and Velasco Elementary taking over grades 2–4. Fleming was scheduled to close when the new Freeport Elementary School opened in 2018.

The town is also served by Brazosport College. The Texas Legislature designated the Brazosport ISD as in the Brazosport College zone.

The town is served by the Brazoria County Library System.
