= Oakland, Brazoria County, Texas =

Oakland
- Unincorporated community
- Location within Texas Location within the United States
- Coordinates: 28°59′36″N 95°26′40″W
- Country: United States
- State: Texas
- County: Brazoria
- Elevation: 207 ft (63 m)
- Time zone: UTC-6 (Central (CST))
  - Summer (DST): UTC-5 (CDT)
- Postal code: 77501
- Area code: 979

Oakland is an unincorporated community in Brazoria County, Texas, United States. The community is located to the west of Freeport.

== History ==
Henry William Munson arrived in the area in 1828, and Oakland was the name of his plantation. The land was purchased by Munson from Stephen F. Austin,
