= Brazosport, Texas =

- Unincorporated community
- Location within Texas Location within the United States
- Coordinates: 28°56′50″N 95°18′52″W
- Country: United States
- State: Texas
- County: Brazoria
- Elevation: 7 ft (2.1 m)
- Time zone: UTC-6 (Central (CST))
  - Summer (DST): UTC-5 (CDT)
- Area code: 979
- GNIS feature ID: 2034782

Brazosport is an unincorporated community in Brazoria County, Texas, United States. According to the Handbook of Texas, the community had a population of 61,198 in 2000. It is located within the Greater Houston metropolitan area.

== Geography ==
Brazosport is located on Texas State Highway 288 where the Brazos River empties into the Gulf of Mexico, 60 miles (97 km) south of Houston in southern Brazoria County.

== Education ==
The Brazosport Independent School District was formed in 1944 and consisted of a high school, five junior high schools, nine elementary schools, and a community college in 1957.
