= Hasima, Texas =

- Ghost town
- Location within Texas Location within the United States
- Coordinates: 29°1′42″N 95°46′28″W
- Country: United States
- State: Texas
- County: Brazoria
- Elevation: 33 ft (10 m)
- Time zone: UTC-6 (Central (CST))
  - Summer (DST): UTC-5 (CDT)
- Area code: 979
- GNIS feature ID: 1379905

Hasima is a ghost town in Brazoria County, Texas, United States. It is located within the Greater Houston metropolitan area.

== Geography ==
Hasima is located 4 miles (6.4 km) west of Sweeny on the Linnville Bayou in southwestern Brazoria County, forming its border with Matagorda County.

== Education ==
From 1918 to 1937, Hasima had a single school When it closed, the remaining students went to school in Bay City and Van Vleck. Today, Hasima is located within the Sweeny Independent School District.
