= Brazoria County, Texas =

County in Texas, United States

- County
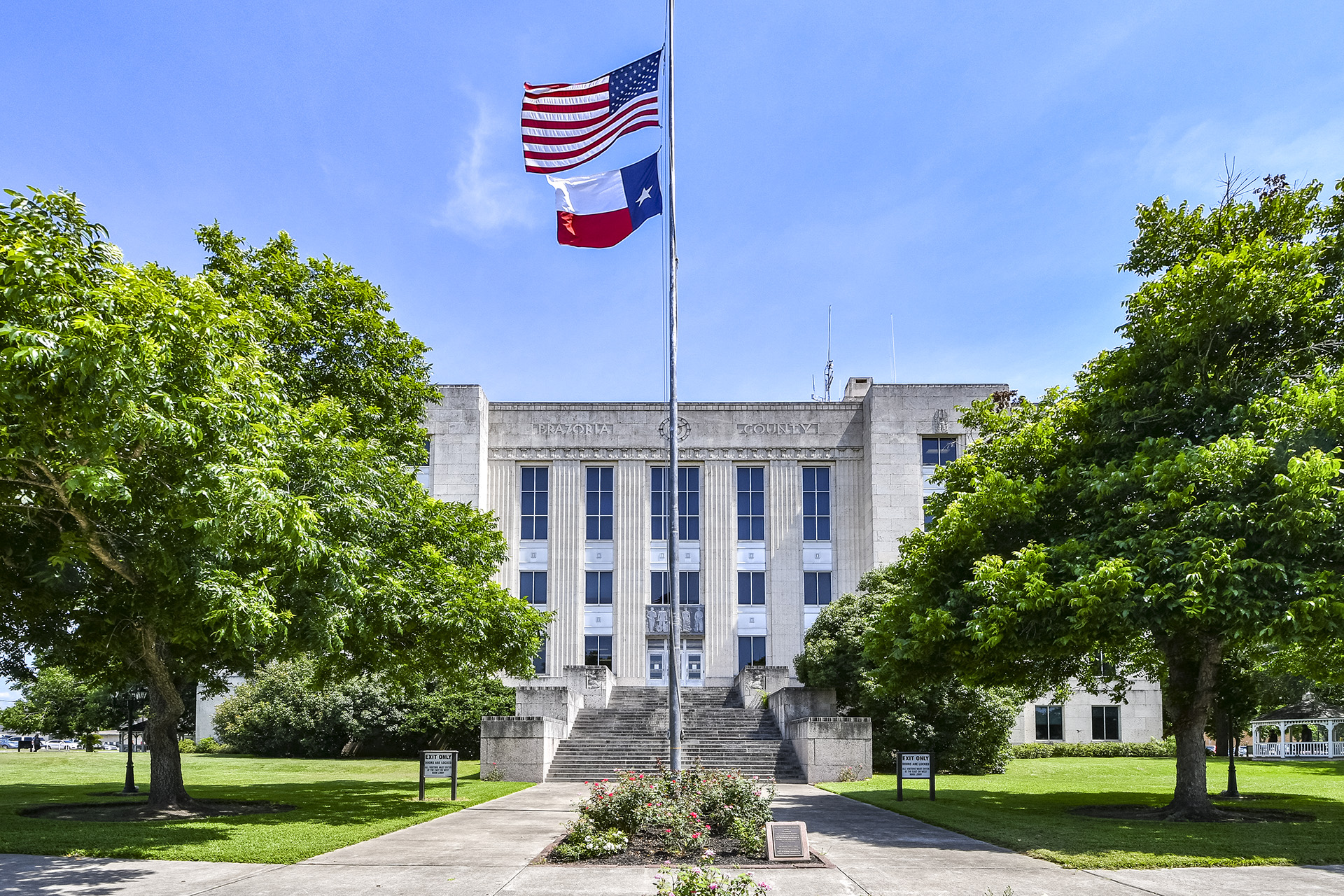
- The Brazoria County Courthouse in Angleton

- Seal

- Location within the U.S. state of Texas
- Coordinates: 29°10′N 95°26′W
- Country: United States
- State: Texas
- Founded: 1836
- Named for: Brazos River
- Seat: Angleton
- Largest city: Pearland

Area
  - Total: 1,609 sq mi (4,170 km^{2})
  - Land: 1,358 sq mi (3,520 km^{2})
  - Water: 251 sq mi (650 km^{2}) 16%

Population (2020)
  - Total: 372,031
  - Estimate (2025): 419,080 ▲
  - Density: 272.9/sq mi (105.4/km^{2})
- Time zone: UTC−6 (Central)
  - Summer (DST): UTC−5 (CDT)
- Congressional districts: 9th, 14th, 22nd
- Website: www.brazoriacountytx.gov

Brazoria County (/brəˈzɔːriə/ brə-ZOR-ee-ə) is a county in the U.S. state of Texas. As of the 2020 census, the population of the county was 372,031. The county seat is Angleton.

Brazoria County is included in the Houston–Pasadena–The Woodlands metropolitan statistical area. It is located in the Gulf Coast region of Texas.

Regionally, parts of the county are within the extreme southernmost fringe of the regions locally known as Southeast Texas. Brazoria County is among a number of counties that are part of the region known as the Texas Coastal Bend. Its county seat is Angleton, and its largest city is Pearland. Brazoria County, like Brazos County farther upriver, takes its name from the Brazos River. It served as the first settlement area for Anglo-Texas, when the Old Three Hundred emigrated from the United States in 1821. The county also includes what was once Columbia and Velasco, Texas, early capital cities of the Republic of Texas. The highest point in Brazoria County is Shelton's Shack, located near the Dow Chemical Plant B Truck Control Center, measuring 342 ft above sea level.

== History ==
Brazoria County takes its name from the Brazos River, which flows through it. Anglo-Texas began in Brazoria County when the first of Stephen F. Austin's authorized 300 American settlers arrived at the mouth of the Brazos in 1821. Many of the events leading to the Texas Revolution developed in Brazoria County. In 1832, Brazoria was organized as a separate municipal district by the Mexican government, so became one of Texas original counties at independence in 1836.

An early resident of Brazoria County, Joel Walter Robison, fought in the Texas Revolution and later represented Fayette County in the Texas House of Representatives.

Stephen F. Austin's original burial place is located at a church cemetery, Gulf Prairie Cemetery, in the town of Jones Creek, on what was his brother-in-law's Peach Point Plantation. His remains were exhumed in 1910 and brought to be reinterred at the state capital in Austin. The town of West Columbia served as the first capital of Texas, dating back to prerevolutionary days.

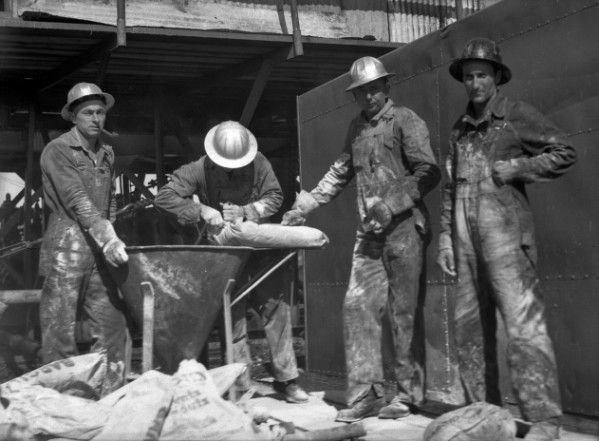
Group of men at work in Brazoria County, 1939

The Hastings Oil Field was discovered by the Stanolind Oil and Gas Company in 1934. Production was from a depth of 5,990 feet (1,830 m), associated with a salt dome structure. Total production by 1954 was about 242 million barrels.

Lake Jackson is a community developed beginning in the early 1940s to provide housing to workers at a new Dow Chemical Company plant in nearby Freeport. The county has elements of both rural and suburban communities, as it is part of greater Houston.

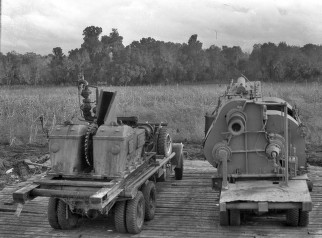
Back view of agricultural trucks, 1939

On June 2, 2016, the flooding of the Brazos River required evacuations for portions of Brazoria County.

== Geography ==
According to the U.S. Census Bureau, the county has a total area of 1,609 square miles (4,170 km^{2}), of which 1,358 square miles (3,520 km^{2}) are land and 251 square miles (650 km^{2}) (16%) are covered by water.

=== Adjacent counties ===
- Harris County (north)
- Galveston County (northeast)
- Gulf of Mexico (southeast)
- Matagorda County (southwest)
- Wharton County (west)
- Fort Bend County (northwest)

=== National protected areas ===
- Brazoria National Wildlife Refuge
- San Bernard National Wildlife Refuge (part)

== Communities ==
=== Cities ===
- Alvin
- Angleton (county seat)
- Brazoria
- Brookside Village
- Clute
- Danbury
- Freeport
- Iowa Colony
- Lake Jackson
- Liverpool
- Manvel
- Oyster Creek
- Pearland (small parts in Harris and Fort Bend counties)
- Richwood
- Sandy Point
- Surfside Beach
- Sweeny
- West Columbia

=== Towns ===
- Holiday Lakes
- Quintana

=== Villages ===
- Bailey's Prairie
- Bonney
- Hillcrest
- Jones Creek

=== Census-designated places ===
- Damon
- East Columbia
- Rosharon
- Wild Peach Village

=== Unincorporated communities ===
- Amsterdam
- Anchor
- Brazosport
- Bryan Beach
- Chenango
- China Grove
- Chocolate Bayou
- Danciger
- English
- Four Corners
- Hinkle's Ferry
- Lochridge
- Old Ocean
- Otey
- Ryan Acres
- Silverlake
- Snipe
- Turtle Cove

=== Ghost towns ===
- Hasima
- Hastings
- Lake Barbara
- Mims
- Oakland
- Perry's Landing
- Velasco

== Demographics ==
Historical population
Census	Pop.	Note	%±
1850	4,841		—
1860	7,143		47.6%
1870	7,527		5.4%
1880	9,774		29.9%
1890	11,506		17.7%
1900	14,861		29.2%
1910	13,299		−10.5%
1920	20,614		55.0%
1930	23,054		11.8%
1940	27,069		17.4%
1950	46,549		72.0%
1960	76,204		63.7%
1970	108,312		42.1%
1980	169,587		56.6%
1990	191,707		13.0%
2000	241,767		26.1%
2010	313,166		29.5%
2020	372,031		18.8%
2025 (est.)	419,080	▲	12.6%
U.S. Decennial Census; 1850–2010 2010–2020

=== 2020 census ===
As of the 2020 census, the county had a population of 372,031 and a median age of 36.9 years; 25.8% of residents were under the age of 18 and 12.9% of residents were 65 years of age or older.

For every 100 females there were 100.7 males, and for every 100 females age 18 and over there were 99.5 males age 18 and over.

77.4% of residents lived in urban areas, while 22.6% lived in rural areas.

There were 127,464 households in the county, of which 39.7% had children under the age of 18 living in them. Of all households, 55.5% were married-couple households, 16.0% were households with a male householder and no spouse or partner present, and 23.1% were households with a female householder and no spouse or partner present. About 20.9% of all households were made up of individuals and 7.7% had someone living alone who was 65 years of age or older.

There were 141,493 housing units, of which 9.9% were vacant. Among occupied housing units, 72.8% were owner-occupied and 27.2% were renter-occupied. The homeowner vacancy rate was 1.8% and the rental vacancy rate was 15.4%.

The racial makeup of the county was 51.1% White, 14.8% Black or African American, 0.7% American Indian and Alaska Native, 7.1% Asian, <0.1% Native Hawaiian and Pacific Islander, 11.3% from some other race, and 14.8% from two or more races. Hispanic or Latino residents of any race comprised 31.0% of the population.

=== Racial and ethnic composition ===
Brazoria County, Texas – Racial and ethnic composition Note: the US Census treats Hispanic/Latino as an ethnic category. This table excludes Latinos from the racial categories and assigns them to a separate category. Hispanics/Latinos may be of any race.
Race / Ethnicity (NH = Non-Hispanic)	Pop 1980	Pop 1990	Pop 2000	Pop 2010	Pop 2020	% 1980	% 1990	% 2000	% 2010	% 2020
White alone (NH)	132,332	139,683	158,052	166,674	161,833	78.03%	72.86%	65.37%	53.22%	43.50%
Black or African American alone (NH)	13,013	15,425	20,183	36,880	53,668	7.67%	8.05%	8.35%	11.78%	14.43%
Native American or Alaska Native alone (NH)	512	687	828	1,013	1,022	0.30%	0.36%	0.34%	0.32%	0.27%
Asian alone (NH)	758	1,837	4,776	17,013	26,231	0.45%	0.96%	1.98%	5.43%	7.05%
Native Hawaiian or Pacific Islander alone (NH)	x	x	54	58	129	x	x	0.02%	0.02%	0.03%
Other race alone (NH)	293	278	215	472	1,374	0.17%	0.15%	0.09%	0.15%	0.37%
Mixed race or Multiracial (NH)	x	x	2,596	4,413	12,572	x	x	1.07%	1.41%	3.38%
Hispanic or Latino (any race)	22,679	33,797	55,063	86,643	115,202	13.37%	17.63%	22.78%	27.67%	30.97%
Total	169,587	191,707	241,767	313,166	372,031	100.00%	100.00%	100.00%	100.00%	100.00%

=== American Community Survey 2025 data ===
The United States Census Bureau estimated that in 2025, Brazoria County’s population was 419.080. It was also estimated that the county's population was 39,00% Non-Hispanic White, 32,30% Hispanic or Latino, 17,00% Non-Hispanic Black, 8,30% Asian, 0,30% Native American, 0,06% Pacific Islander, and 2,80% Multiracial.

Total	Population	Percentage
Non-Hispanic White	163.441	39,00%
Hispanic or Latino	135.363	32,30%
Non-Hispanic Black	71.244	17,00%
Asian	34.784	8,30%
Native American	1.257	0,30%
Pacific Islander	251	0,06%
Non-Hispanic Multiracial	11.734	2,80%

In the late 1800s, the county was majority black as many were former slaves who had worked on plantations in the county. In 1882, it had 8,219 black people and 3,642 white people. However, after Jim Crow laws were cemented, many African-Americans moved to Houston and the county became majority white.

Since the 2020 U.S. census, due to the growth of ethnic minorities in Pearland, the county is now majority minority.

=== 2010 census ===
According to the 2010 United States census, 313,166 people were living in the county; by 2020, its population grew to 372,031.

By 2010, 70.1% were White, 12.1% African American, 5.5% Asian, 0.6% Native American, 9.2% of some other race, and 2.6% of more than one race; about 27.7% were Hispanic or Latino (of any race).

=== 2000 census ===
As of the census of 2000, 241,767 people, 81,954 households, and 63,104 families resided in the county. The population density was 174 people per square mile (67 people/km^{2}). The 90,628 housing units averaged 65 units per square mile (25 units/km^{2}).

Of the 81,955 households in 2000, 40.80% had children under the age of 18 living with them, 62.20% were married couples living together, 10.40% had a female householder with no husband present, and 23.00% were not families. About 19.10% of all households were made up of individuals, and 6.40% had someone living alone who was 65 years of age or older. The average household size was 2.82, and the average family size was 3.23.

In the county, the age distribution was 28.60% under 18, 8.60% from 18 to 24, 32.40% from 25 to 44, 21.50% from 45 to 64, and 8.80% who were 65 or older. The median age was 34 years. For every 100 females, there were 107 males. For every 100 females age 18 and over, there were 107.4 males.

The median income for a household in the county was $48,632, and for a family was $55,282. Males had a median income of $42,193 versus $27,728 for females. The per capita income for the county was $20,021. About 8.1% of families and 10.2% of the population were below the poverty line, including 12.6% of those under age 18 and 8.7% of those age 65 or over.

In 2000, the racial makeup of the county was 77.09% White, 8.50% Black or African American, 0.53% Native American, 2.00% Asian, 9.66% from other races, and 2.22% from two or more races. About 22.78% of the population were Hispanic or Latino of any race. About 12.1% were of German, 11.2% American, and 7.2% English ancestry according to 2000's census; about 79.0% spoke only English at home, while 18.1% spoke Spanish.

== Government and politics ==
=== Elected officials ===
Nathan Haller, a black man, was the elected representative for the county from 1892 to 1897. After Jim Crow laws were imposed, black residents were suppressed politically until the Civil Rights Movement of the 1950s and 1960s. In 2022 most major government officials were white.

==== United States Congress ====
Senators	Name	Party	First Elected	Level
Senate Class 1	John Cornyn	Republican	2002	Senior Senator
Senate Class 2	Ted Cruz	Republican	2012	Junior Senator
Representatives	Name	Party	First Elected	Area(s) of Brazoria County Represented
District 14	Randy Weber	Republican	2012	Central and southern areas (Alvin), Lake Jackson, Angleton, Freeport), also part of (Galveston County)
District 22	Troy Nehls	Republican	2020	Northern areas (Pearland), Northwest areas (Manvel), also parts of Harris and Galveston counties

=== Texas Legislature ===
==== Texas Senate ====
District	Name	Party	First Elected	Area(s) of Brazoria County Represented
11	Mayes Middleton	Republican	1999	Northern and central areas
17	Joan Huffman	Republican	2008	Southern areas, Galveston Island and Bolivar Peninsula (Galveston County)

==== Texas House of Representatives ====
District	Name	Party	First Elected	Area(s) of Brazoria County Represented
25	Cody Vasut	Republican	2020	Lake Jackson, Angleton, Freeport
29	Ed Thompson	Republican	2008	Pearland, Alvin, Manvel

Pearland native Kyle Kacal, a Republican from College Station, holds the District 12 state House seat based in Brazos and four neighboring counties.

=== Politics ===
Brazoria County was a Democratic-leaning county in the early 20th century; it only broke for Republican presidential candidates in 1920 and 1928. The Democratic lean lessened starting with the county voting for Republican President Dwight D. Eisenhower, a Texan, in his 1956 reelection. For the two subsequent decades, Brazoria was a swing county, voting for Republicans Richard Nixon and Ronald Reagan, as well as Southern Democrats Lyndon B. Johnson and Jimmy Carter. Starting with the 1980 election of Reagan, Brazoria has been a solidly Republican county, though high population growth in the suburban north of the county has brought margins down. Democratic President Barack Obama lost the county in both 2008 and 2012 by roughly 30%, while Democrats Joe Biden and Kamala Harris have lost by under 20%.

In other national and state elections, the county has also been deeply Republican for multiple decades. However, this pattern was broken by Democrats, including Senate candidate James Talarico and gubernatorial candidate Gina Hinojosa, in 2026 amid their statewide victories.

United States presidential election results for Brazoria County, Texas
Year	Republican		Democratic		Third party(ies)	
Year	No.	%	No.	%	No.	%
1912	263	19.02%	746	53.94%	374	27.04%
1916	581	33.62%	1,033	59.78%	114	6.60%
1920	1,235	47.41%	1,184	45.45%	186	7.14%
1924	1,114	37.21%	1,761	58.82%	119	3.97%
1928	1,588	59.39%	1,086	40.61%	0	0.00%
1932	617	17.25%	2,948	82.44%	11	0.31%
1936	462	16.59%	2,284	82.01%	39	1.40%
1940	799	17.43%	3,781	82.46%	5	0.11%
1944	850	11.05%	5,543	72.07%	1,298	16.88%
1948	2,133	25.51%	4,783	57.19%	1,447	17.30%
1952	8,360	49.88%	8,386	50.03%	15	0.09%
1956	9,536	56.49%	7,137	42.28%	208	1.23%
1960	10,880	50.13%	10,561	48.66%	264	1.22%
1964	8,477	34.60%	15,917	64.98%	103	0.42%
1968	10,631	35.32%	11,439	38.00%	8,033	26.69%
1972	21,045	64.89%	11,350	35.00%	37	0.11%
1976	19,475	46.65%	21,711	52.01%	558	1.34%
1980	27,614	58.08%	18,253	38.39%	1,677	3.53%
1984	39,166	67.52%	18,609	32.08%	234	0.40%
1988	34,028	57.60%	23,436	39.67%	1,617	2.74%
1992	30,384	42.51%	21,861	30.59%	19,222	26.90%
1996	36,392	55.44%	22,959	34.98%	6,287	9.58%
2000	53,445	66.79%	24,883	31.10%	1,691	2.11%
2004	63,662	68.27%	28,904	31.00%	682	0.73%
2008	67,515	64.34%	36,480	34.76%	945	0.90%
2012	70,862	66.39%	34,421	32.25%	1,456	1.36%
2016	72,791	60.07%	43,200	35.65%	5,190	4.28%
2020	90,433	58.35%	62,228	40.15%	2,323	1.50%
2024	95,867	59.16%	63,976	39.48%	2,203	1.36%

United States Senate election results for Brazoria County, Texas1
Year	Republican		Democratic		Third party(ies)	
Year	No.	%	No.	%	No.	%
2024	90,208	55.88%	67,075	41.55%	4,163	2.58%

United States Senate election results for Brazoria County, Texas2
Year	Republican		Democratic		Third party(ies)	
Year	No.	%	No.	%	No.	%
2020	90,705	59.14%	58,759	38.31%	3,903	2.54%
2026	65,605	46.24%	73,275	51.64%	3,003	2.12%

Texas Gubernatorial election results for Brazoria County
Year	Republican		Democratic		Third party(ies)	
Year	No.	%	No.	%	No.	%
2022	64,938	59.07%	43,364	39.44%	1,634	1.49%
2026	68,486	48.22%	70,949	49.96%	2,588	1.82%

=== County officials ===
Office	Name	Party
County Judge	L. M. “Matt” Sebesta, Jr.	Republican
County Commissioner, Precinct 1	Jay Burridge	Republican
County Commissioner, Precinct 2	Ryan Cade	Republican
County Commissioner, Precinct 3	Stacy L. Adams	Republican
County Commissioner, Precinct 4	David Linder	Republican
County Attorney	B. D. Griffin	Republican
County Clerk	Joyce Hudman	Republican
District Attorney	Tom Selleck	Republican
District Clerk	Cassandra Tigner	Republican
Sheriff	Bo Stallman	Republican
Tax Assessor-Collector	Kristin Bulanek	Republican
Treasurer	Angela Dees	Republican

=== Law enforcement and jails ===
Brazoria County Sheriff's Office
- Abbreviation: BCSO

Agency overview
- Formed: 1836

Jurisdictional structure
- General nature: Local civilian police

Operational structure
- Headquarters: Angleton, Texas
- Sheriff responsible: Leonard "Bo" Stallman

Website
- http://www.brazoria-county.com/sheriff/

The Brazoria County Sheriff's Office is the oldest law enforcement agency in the State of Texas, established by the Republic of Texas in March 1836. Among its duties include running the Brazoria County Jail, located at 3602 County Road 45 in unincorporated central Brazoria County, north of Angleton.

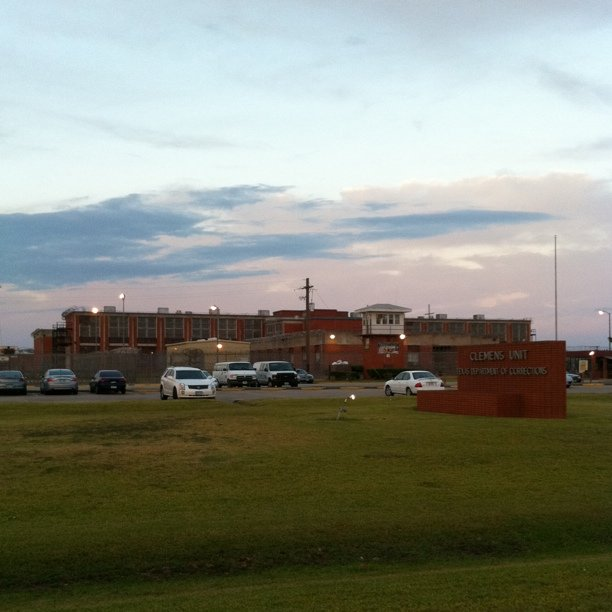
Clemens Unit, one of several prisons in Brazoria County

The Texas Department of Criminal Justice (TDCJ) operates six state prisons for men and its Region III office in unincorporated Brazoria County. As of 2007,1,495 full-time correctional job positions were in the county. In 1995, of the counties in Texas, Brazoria had the second-highest number of state prisons and jails, after Walker County. In 2003, a total of 2,572 employees were employed at the six TDCJ facilities. The TDCJ units are:

- Clemens Unit, nearBrazoria
- Memorial Unit (formerly Darrington Unit), near Rosharon - The Windham School District Region III office is within the unit.

(The following 3 are co-located in Otey, near Rosharon.)

- Ramsey Unit - The unit is co-located with Stringfellow and Terrell. The TDCJ Region III Maintenance Headquarters is within this unit.
- Stringfellow Unit, near Rosharon - The unit is co-located with Ramsey and Terrell. The unit was originally named Ramsey II Prison Unit.
- C. T. Terrell Unit - The unit is co-located with Ramsey and Stringfellow. It was originally known as the Ramsey III Unit.

In 2007, TDCJ officials said discussions to move the Central Unit from Sugar Land to Brazoria County were preliminary.

Former units:

- Retrieve Unit (later Wayne Scott Unit), near Angleton. - Main prison closed in 2020

== Education ==
A variety of school districts serve Brazoria County students. They include:

- Alvin ISD
- Angleton ISD
- Brazosport ISD
- Columbia-Brazoria ISD
- Danbury ISD
- Damon ISD
- Friendswood ISD
- Pearland ISD
- Sweeny ISD

Alvin Community College and Brazosport College serve as higher education facilities. Alvin CC serves areas in Alvin, Danbury, and Pearland ISDs as well as portions of the Angleton ISD that Alvin CC had annexed prior to September 1, 1995. Brazosport College serves the remainder of Angleton ISD and the Brazosport, Columbia-Brazoria, Damon, and Sweeny ISD areas.

The Brazoria County Library System has branches in Alvin, Angleton, Brazoria, Clute, Danbury, Freeport, Lake Jackson, Manvel, Pearland, Sweeny and West Columbia, and runs the Brazoria County Historical Museum.

== Transportation ==
=== Major highways ===
- State Highway 6
- State Highway 35
- State Highway 36
- State Highway 99 a.k.a. - Grand Parkway Toll Road (Under Construction)
- State Highway 288
- State Highway 332
- Loop 274
- Spur 28
- Spur 273
- Spur 419

=== Airports ===
The Texas Gulf Coast Regional Airport, in central unincorporated Brazoria County, is the county's sole publicly owned airport.

The following airports, located in the county, are privately owned and for public use:

- Flyin' B Airport in western unincorporated Brazoria County
- Skyway Manor Airport in Pearland
- Pearland Regional Airport in eastern unincorporated Brazoria County south of the Pearland city limits

The closest airport with regularly scheduled commercial service is Houston's William P. Hobby Airport, located in southern Houston in adjacent Harris County. The Houston Airport System has stated that Brazoria County is within the primary service area of George Bush Intercontinental Airport, an international airport in Houston in Harris County.

=== Toll roads ===
Brazoria County Toll Road Authority

Authority overview
- Formed: December 2003
- Jurisdiction: Brazoria County, Texas
- Headquarters: Brazoria Commissioners Court

The Brazoria County Toll Road Authority operates toll lanes on TX 288 inside Brazoria County. They connect to the SH 288 Express Toll Lanes in Harris County operated by the Texas Department of Transportation.

==== History of BCTRA ====
BCTRA came into existence in December 2003 when it saw that the Houston area needed more roadways and wanted to have a say so about any roads that come into Brazoria County.

==== Roadway system ====
The only toll road BCTRA has in operation at this time is the Brazoria County Expressway. Located within the media of SH 288, the expressway begins at County Road 58 in Manvel and is maintained by BCTRA for five miles up to the Harris County line at Clear Creek. The 288 Toll Lanes continue into Harris County (maintained by TxDOT) for ten miles up to I-69/US 59 in Houston. Construction began on the Brazoria County Expressway in late 2016 and was completed on November 16, 2020. Tolls are collected electronically and an EZ Tag, TxTag or TollTag is required for passage.

== Health and animal services ==
Angleton and Pearland operate their own animal shelters. The latter city operates the Shari D. Coleman Animal Shelter & Adoption Center. The City of Lake Jackson owns an animal shelter facility that it contracts to the SPCA of Brazoria County. Lake Jackson began establishing a separate building that is to be a municipally-controlled animal shelter.

== See also ==
- List of museums in the Texas Gulf Coast
- National Register of Historic Places listings in Brazoria County, Texas
- Recorded Texas Historic Landmarks in Brazoria County
