= Turtle Cove, Texas =

Unincorporated community in Texas, US

Turtle Cove is an unincorporated community in Brazoria County, Texas, United States.

The community, located along Oyster Creek, mainly consists of beach houses.

Turtle Cove consists of three side streets and one main street. Homes are located directly on canals that feed into the Intracoastal Waterway which feeds into the Gulf of Mexico. During Tropical Storm Allison, Turtle Cove was devastated by flooding up to 9–10 feet of salt water. Turtle Cove was hit by Hurricane Ike, a strong category 2 storm, early in the morning of September 13, 2008. Its neighbor, Surfside Beach was devastated by storm surge.
