= Angleton High School =

Public school in Texas, United States

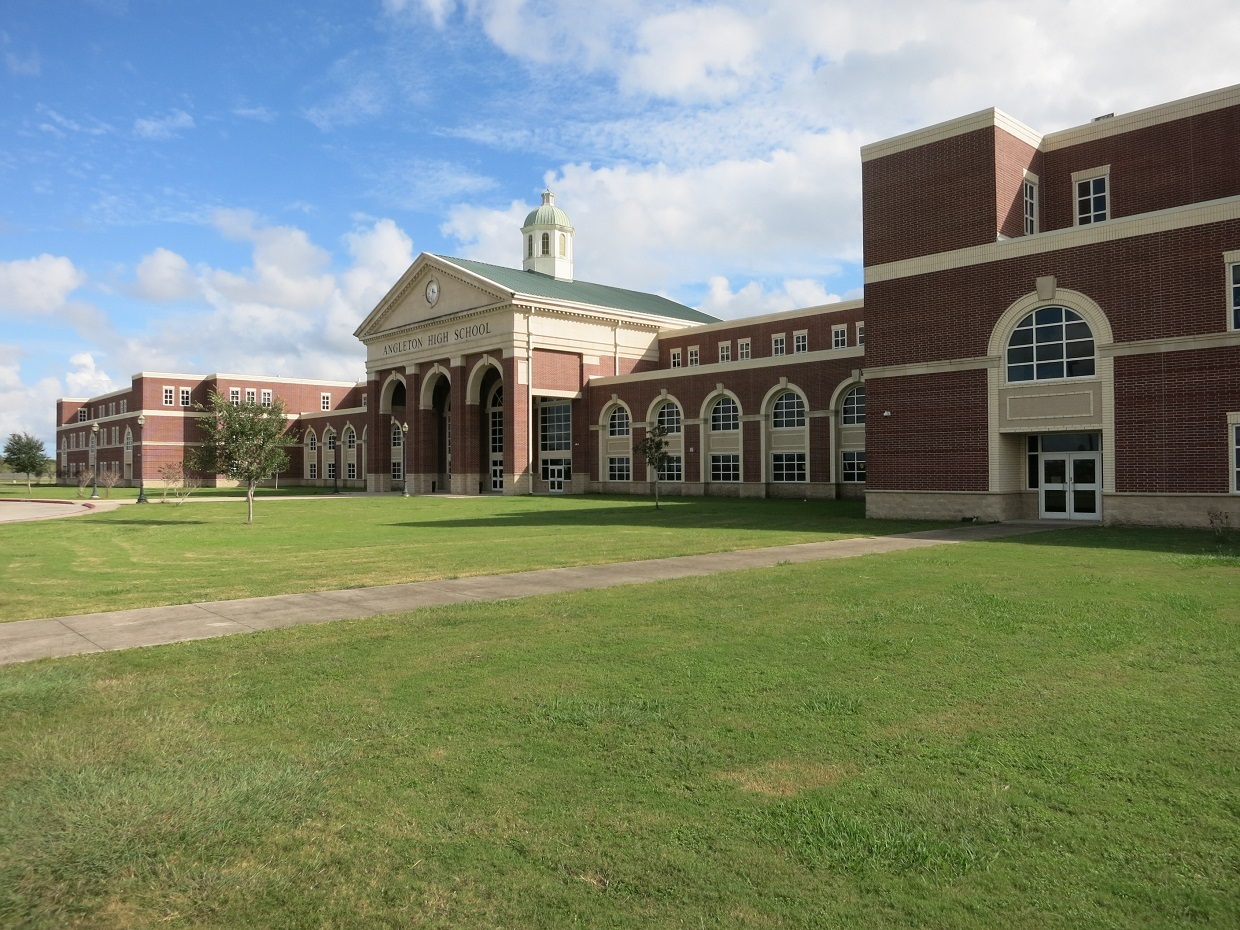

Location
- 1 Campus Drive; Angleton, Texas 77515-2899; United States; 29.197961°N 95.416364°W

Information
- School type: Public high school
- Motto: Home of Champions/ Because We're Wildcats
- Established: 2010
- School district: Angleton Independent School District
- Superintendent: Phil Edwards
- Principal: Terri Benson
- Teaching staff: 128.19 (on an FTE basis)
- Grades: 9-12
- Enrollment: 2,159 (2023–2024)
- Student to teacher ratio: 16.84
- Colors: Purple & white
- Athletics conference: UIL Class AAAAA
- Mascot: Wildcat
- Rival: Brazoswood High School
- Newspaper: Tattler
- Yearbook: Angle
- Website: www.angletonisd.net/o/ahs

Angleton High School is a public high school in Brazoria County, Texas, United States. It is classified as a 5A school by the University Interscholastic League (UIL). It is a part of the Angleton Independent School District located in south central Brazoria County. For the 2024-2025 school year, the school was given a "B" by the Texas Education Agency.

Several previous school locations were destroyed by hurricanes. The high school was once located in what is now Central Elementary, as well as the former Angleton Intermediate School. The recently built high school is located at 1 Campus Dr. on the outskirts of Angleton. The varsity football stadium and baseball field are located next to Angleton High School.

Angleton ISD serves Angleton as well as the Village of Bonney, the Rosharon census-designated place, and the unincorporated areas of Chocolate Bayou, Lochridge, Otey, and Sandy Point.

== Athletics ==
The Angleton Wildcats compete in:

- Baseball
- Basketball
- Cross country
- Football
- Golf
- Soccer
- Softball
- Swimming and diving
- Tennis
- Track and field
- Volleyball

=== State titles ===
- Girls' basketball
  - 1956 (2A), 1973 (3A)
- Softball
  - 1994 (5A), 2019 (5A)
- Boys' track
  - 1969 (3A)

== Band ==
The Angleton High School Marching Band is known as the "Purple Pride".

== Theatre ==
Angleton High School's theater department puts on a fall show every year, along with other shows throughout the year, including competing in the UIL One Act Play competition. The Angleton High School Theatre program includes the Speech & Debate team, which competes in UIL, TFA, and NSDA. Angleton High School is a member of the Thespian Honor Society represented as Troupe 266.

== Notable alumni ==
=== Sports ===
- Quandre Diggs - football player, defensive back for the Seattle Seahawks
- Mark Farris - former Texas A&M University quarterback and former shortstop in Pittsburgh Pirates minor league system
- Charley Frazier - American football player
- Gilbert Gardner - pro football linebacker, Super Bowl champion
- Ahmard Hall - starter for BCS Champions 2005 Texas Longhorns football team and former Tennessee Titans fullback
- Quentin Jammer - football player, The University of Texas, played 11 seasons as San Diego Chargers defensive back and his last season in 2013 for Denver Broncos
- Henry Josey - CFL running back for Toronto Argonauts
- Tom Muecke - football player
- Larry Stephens - NFL defensive end
- Rodney Terry - basketball head coach, Texas
- Emmitt Thomas - football player, Marshall High, NFL Hall of Fame with Kansas City Chiefs
- Keith Toston - CFL Calgary Stampeders running back
- Ray Willis - professional football player

=== Government ===
- Dennis Bonnen (Class of 1990) - Republican member of the Texas House of Representatives from District 25 in Brazoria County (1997–2021) and 75th speaker of the Texas House of Representatives
- Greg Bonnen (Class of 1984) - Republican member of the Texas House of Representatives from District 24 in Galveston County (2013–present)
- Drew B. Tipton (Class of 1985) - district judge for the United States District Court for the Southern District of Texas
- Cody Vasut (Class of 2005) - Republican member of the Texas House of Representatives from District 25 in Brazoria County (2021–present)
