= Otey, Texas =

- Unincorporated community
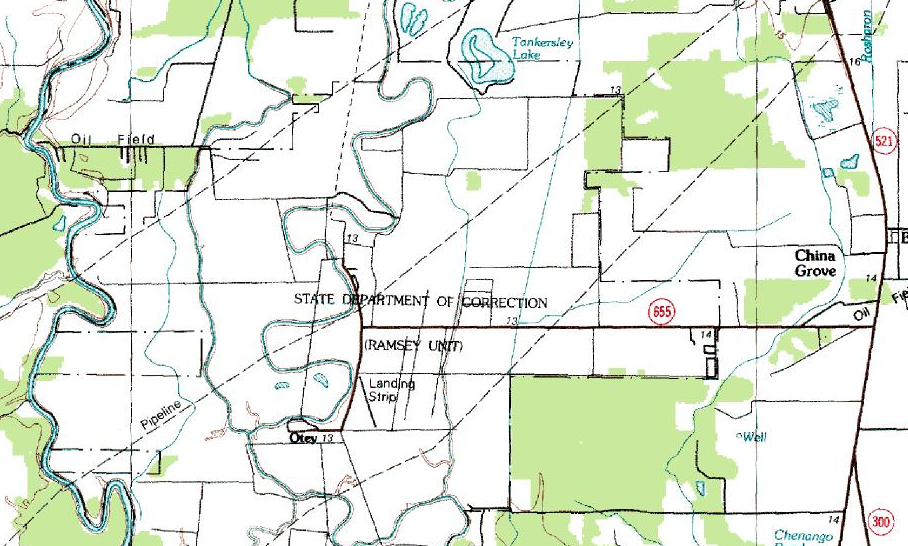
- Topographic map of the Ramsey Units, July 1, 1984

- Location within the state of Texas Otey (the United States)
- Coordinates: 29°17′09″N 95°32′44″W
- Country: United States
- State: Texas
- County: Brazoria
- Time zone: UTC-6 (Central (CST))
  - Summer (DST): UTC-5 (CDT)

Otey is an unincorporated community located in northwestern Brazoria County, Texas, United States. According to the Handbook of Texas, the community had a population of 318 in 2000. It is located within the Greater Houston metropolitan area.

== Geography ==
Otey, on Oyster Creek, is on the westernmost extension of Farm to Market Road 655. It is 12 mi (19 km) north of Angleton.

== Education ==
Angleton Independent School District operates schools in the area.

== Gallery ==
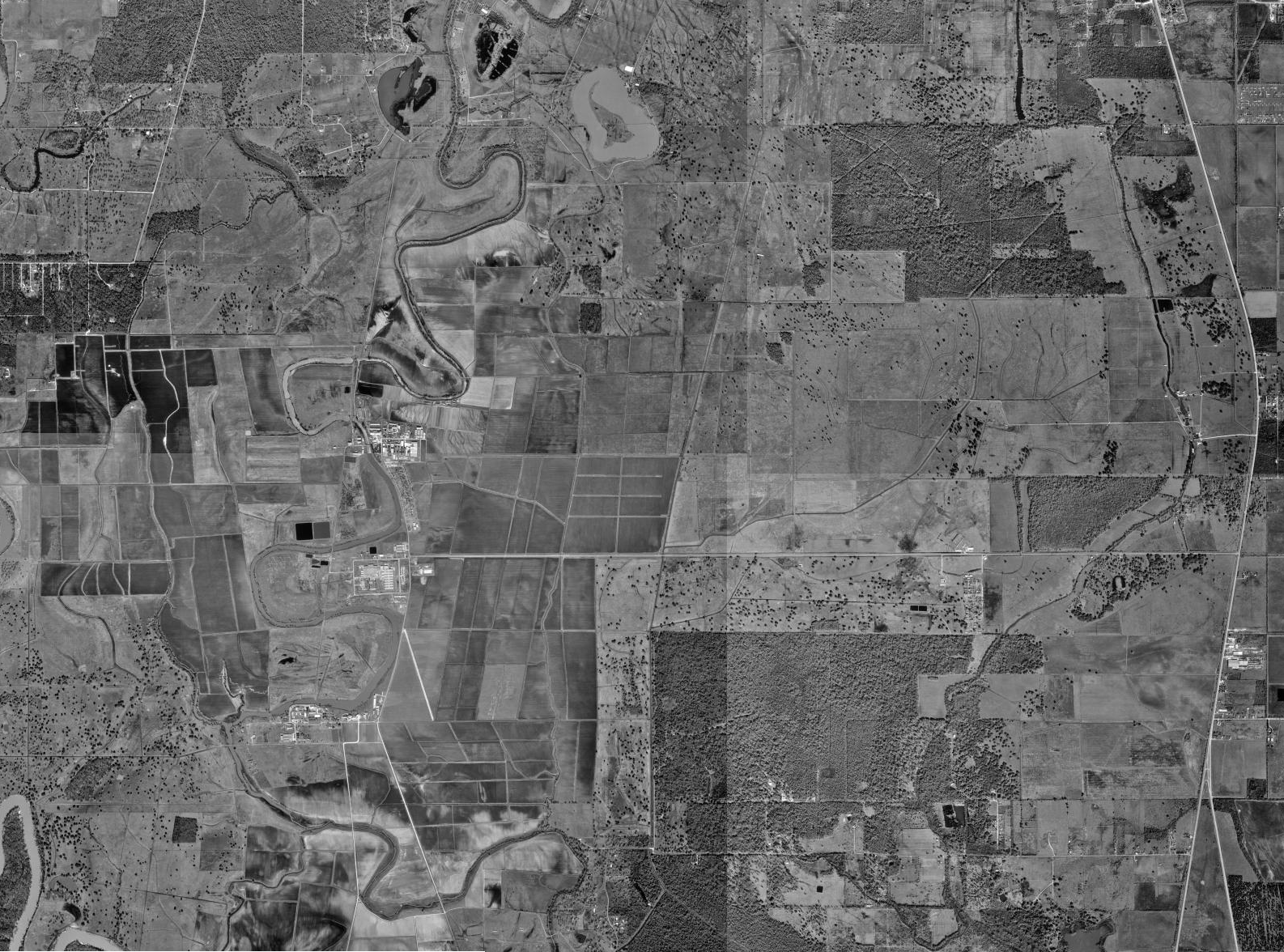
Aerial photograph of the Ramsey Units, January 23, 1995, United States Geological Survey
