= Chocolate Bayou, Texas =

Chocolate Bayou
- Unincorporated community
- Location within the state of Texas Chocolate Bayou (the United States)
- Coordinates: 29°18′48″N 95°15′08″W
- Country: United States
- State: Texas
- County: Brazoria
- Time zone: UTC-6 (Central (CST))
  - Summer (DST): UTC-5 (CDT)
- GNIS feature ID: 1354458

Chocolate Bayou is an unincorporated community in eastern Brazoria County, Texas, United States. According to the Handbook of Texas, the community had a population of 60 in 2000. It is located within the Greater Houston metropolitan area.

== Geography ==
Chocolate Bayou is located on Farm to Market Road 2917 between Texas State Highway 35 and FM 2403 in eastern Brazoria County.

== Education ==
The Alvin Independent School District operates schools in the area. Children attend R.L. Stevenson Primary School, Walt Disney Elementary School, Alvin Junior High School, and Alvin High School.

== Notable person ==
- James Elijah Brown Perry (born May 17, 1830, in Potosi, Missouri; died February 14, 1831, in Chocolate Bayou)
