= Brazosport Independent School District =

School district in Texas, United States

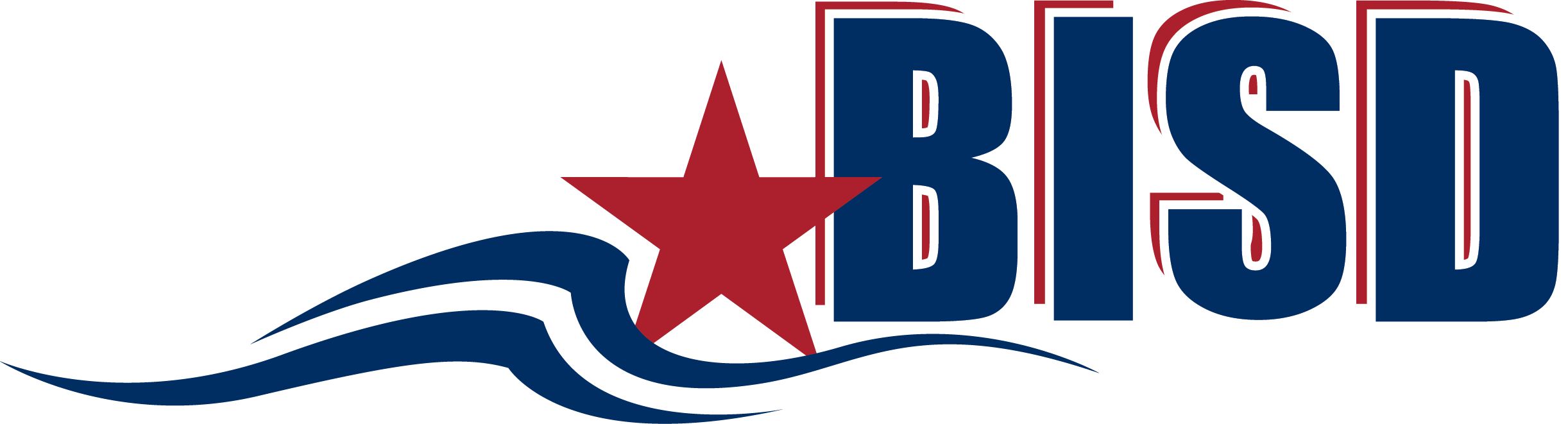

Location
- 301 W. Brazoswood Dr. Clute, Texas ESC Region 4 USA
- Coordinates: 29°1′28″N 95°24′56″W

District information
- Type: Independent School District
- Motto: Setting the Standard for Educational Excellence!
- Grades: Pre-K through 12
- Established: 1944
- Superintendent: Danny Massey
- Schools: 19 (2014-2015)
- NCES District ID: 4811190

Students and staff
- Students: 12,300 (2014-2015)
- Teachers: 800 (2014-15) (on full-time equivalent (FTE) basis)
- Student–teacher ratio: 12.63 (2009-10)

Other information
- TEA District Accountability Rating for 2011-12: Academically Acceptable
- Website: Brazosport ISD

Brazosport Independent School District is a school district based in Clute, Texas (USA) in Greater Houston. The district, within Brazoria County, includes the cities, towns, and villages of Clute, Freeport, Jones Creek, Lake Jackson, Oyster Creek, Quintana, Richwood, and Surfside Beach. In addition, it serves the unincorporated area of Turtle Cove.

== History ==
The district opened in 1944.

Prior to 2013 the district had contracts with the police forces of Clute, Freeport, and Lake Jackson to provide police services to the district. In 2013 the district decided to end the contracts and create a district police department. The yearly cost to maintain this department would be $32,000.

== Finances ==
As of the 2010-2011 school year, the appraised valuation of property in the district was $6,406,446,000. The maintenance tax rate was $0.104 and the bond tax rate was $0.020 per $100 of appraised valuation.

== Academic achievement ==
In 2011, the school district was rated "academically acceptable" by the Texas Education Agency. Forty-nine percent of districts in Texas in 2011 received the same rating. No state accountability ratings will be given to districts in 2012. A school district in Texas can receive one of four possible rankings from the Texas Education Agency: Exemplary (the highest possible ranking), Recognized, Academically Acceptable, and Academically Unacceptable (the lowest possible ranking).

Historical district TEA accountability ratings

- 2011: Academically Acceptable
- 2010: Recognized
- 2009: Academically Acceptable
- 2008: Academically Acceptable
- 2007: Academically Acceptable
- 2006: Academically Acceptable
- 2005: Academically Acceptable
- 2004: Academically Acceptable

== Schools ==
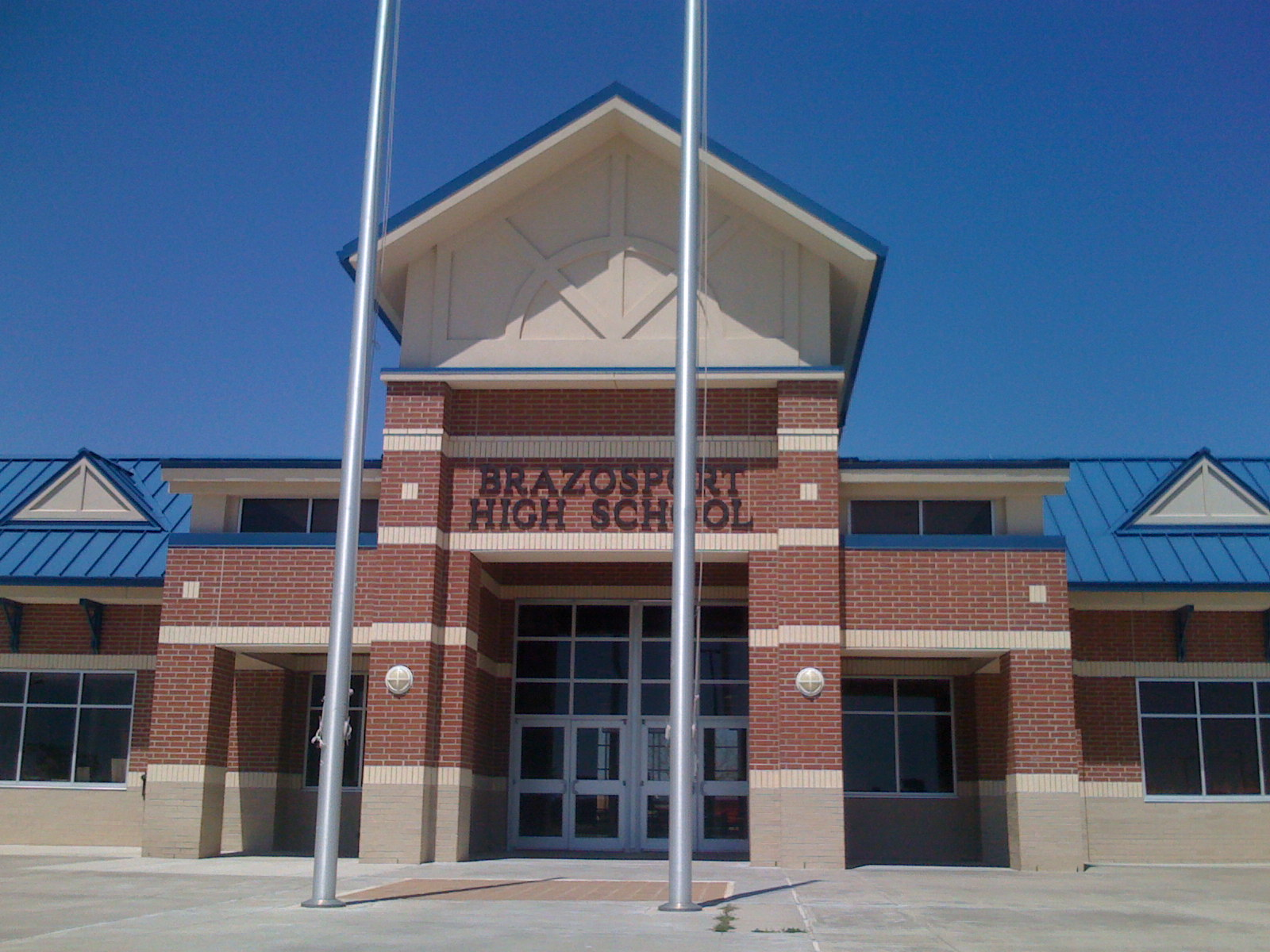
Brazosport High School

High schools

- Brazoswood High School (Clute; Grades 9-12; Mascot: Buccaneers)
- Brazosport High School (Freeport; Grades 9-12; Mascot: Exporters)

5-8 schools

- Clute Intermediate School (Clute; Grades 5-6 & 7-8; Mascot: Cougars)

Intermediate Schools (7-8)

- Freeport Intermediate School (Freeport; Grades 7-8; Mascot: Redskins)
  - 2001-02 National Blue Ribbon School
- Lake Jackson Intermediate School (Lake Jackson; Grades 7-8; Mascot: Panthers)

Middle Schools (5-6)

- R. O'Hara Lanier Middle School (Freeport; Grades: 5-6; Mascot: Lions)
- Grady B. Rasco Middle School (Lake Jackson; Grades: 5-6; Mascot: Rockets)

Elementary Schools

- Stephen F. Austin Elementary (Jones Creek; Grades: PreK-6)
- A. P. Beutel Elementary School (Lake Jackson; Grades: K-4) - Its current building was scheduled to open in 2017.
  - 2007 National Blue Ribbon School
- Bess Brannen Elementary School (Lake Jackson; Grades: K-4)
- Freeport Elementary School - The $19.2 million facility opened in 2018. VLK Architects designed the building. The student capacity is 750.
- Madge Griffith Elementary School (Clute; Grades: K-4)
- Elisabeth Ney Elementary School (Lake Jackson; Grades: K-4)
- T. W. Ogg Elementary (Clute; Grades: K-4)
  - 1996-97 National Blue Ribbon School
- Gladys Polk Elementary (Richwood; Grades: K-4)
- O. M. Roberts Elementary (Lake Jackson; Grades: K-4)
- Velasco Elementary School (Freeport; Grades: 2-4) - It was a Kindergarten through grade 4 school until 2017, when it became a grade 2-4 school for all of Freeport. Grades K-1 were moved to O. A. Fleming Elementary, which was scheduled to close in 2018 and be replaced by Freeport Elementary.

Alternative School

- Lighthouse Learning Center (Clute; All Grades)
- Brazos Success Academy

=== Former schools ===
- O. A. Fleming Elementary School (Freeport; Grades: K-1) - Fleming was scheduled to close when the new Freeport Elementary School opened in 2018.
- Jane Long Elementary School - It opened in 1952 and closed in August 2017.

== Headquarters ==
The headquarters are physically in Clute, while the district uses a separate Freeport mailing address.

== Athletics ==
The district was formed in the year 1944 when all the existing school districts merged into one.

Hopper Field, located on the campus of Brazosport High School on the east bank of the Brazos River in Freeport, serves as the home stadium for BISD football and the site of district commencement ceremonies. The stadium opened September 16, 1949 and was named for Herbert Eugene Hopper, a Brazosport coach since 1927 who later served as the school's athletic director until his retirement in 1971. Originally seating 6,400, capacity was expanded to 8,662 in 1961 and now stands at 10,478 following later renovations that also included the installation of artificial turf in 2004.

== See also ==
- List of school districts in Texas
- List of high schools in Texas
