= Angleton Independent School District =

School district in Texas, United States

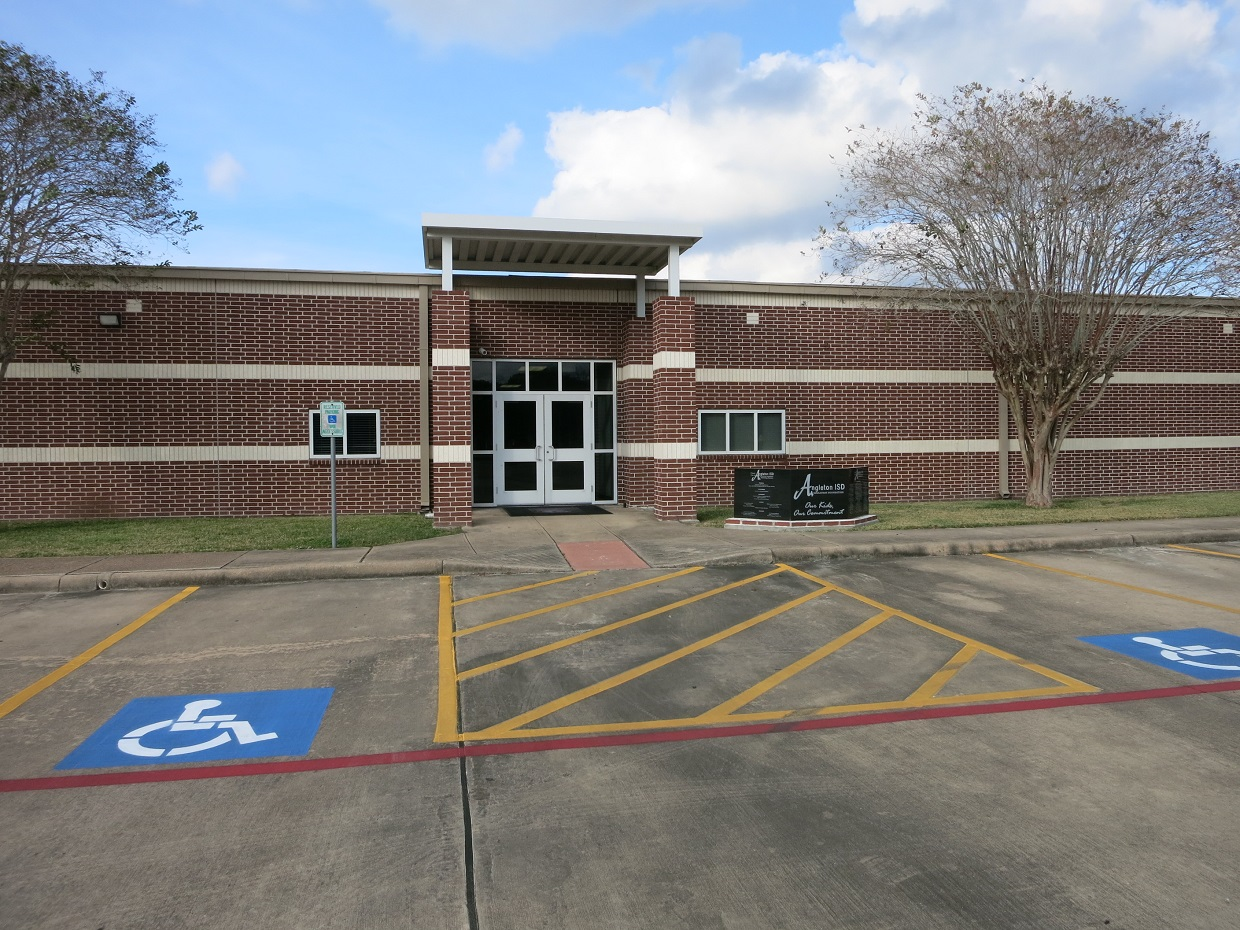
- Angleton ISD Administration Offices

Location
- 1900 N Downing Rd. Angleton, Texas ESC Region 4 USA
- Coordinates: 29°10′40″N 95°25′7″W

District information
- Type: Independent school district
- Grades: Pre-K through 12
- Superintendent: Phil Edwards, Ed.M.
- Schools: 13 (2009-10)
- NCES District ID: 4808310

Students and staff
- Students: 6,472 (2010-11)
- Teachers: 402.92 (2009-10) (on full-time equivalent (FTE) basis)
- Student–teacher ratio: 15.73 (2009-10)
- Athletic conference: UIL Class 5A Football & Basketball
- District mascot: Wildcats
- Colors: Purple, White

Other information
- TEA District Accountability Rating for 2011-12: Recognized
- Website: Angleton ISD

Angleton ISD is a public school district in Angleton, Texas, United States, operating 5 levels of education. Established in 1897, Angleton ISD encompasses 396 square miles (1,030 km^{2}) in Brazoria County, serving Angleton as well as the Village of Bonney, the Sandy Point census-designated place, all of the CDP of Rosharon, and portions of Alvin and Lake Jackson. It also includes the unincorporated areas of Chocolate Bayou, Lochridge, and Otey.

== Finances ==
As of the 2010–2011 school year, the appraised valuation of property in the district was $2,145,243,000. The maintenance tax rate was $0.104 and the bond tax rate was $0.042 per $100 of appraised valuation.

== Academic achievement ==
In 2011, the school district was rated "recognized" by the Texas Education Agency. Thirty-five percent of districts in Texas in 2011 received the same rating. No state accountability ratings will be given to districts in 2012. A school district in Texas can receive one of four possible rankings from the Texas Education Agency: Exemplary (the highest possible ranking), Recognized, Academically Acceptable, and Academically Unacceptable (the lowest possible ranking).

Historical district TEA accountability ratings

- 2011: Recognized
- 2010: Exemplary
- 2009: Recognized
- 2008: Recognized
- 2007: Recognized
- 2006: Academically Acceptable
- 2005: Academically Acceptable
- 2004: Recognized

== Schools ==
In the 2011–2012 school year, the district had students in twelve schools.

=== Regular instructional ===
High schools

- Angleton High School (Grades 9-12)

Junior high schools

- Angleton Junior High School (Grades 6-8)
- Heritage Junior High School (Grades 6-8)

Elementary schools

- Central Elementary (Grades PK-5)
- Frontier Elementary (Grades K-5)
- Heartland Elementary (Grades K-5)
- Northside Elementary (Grades PK-5)
- Rancho Isabella Elementary (Grades K-5)
- Southside Elementary (Grades K-5)
- Westside Elementary (Grades K-5)
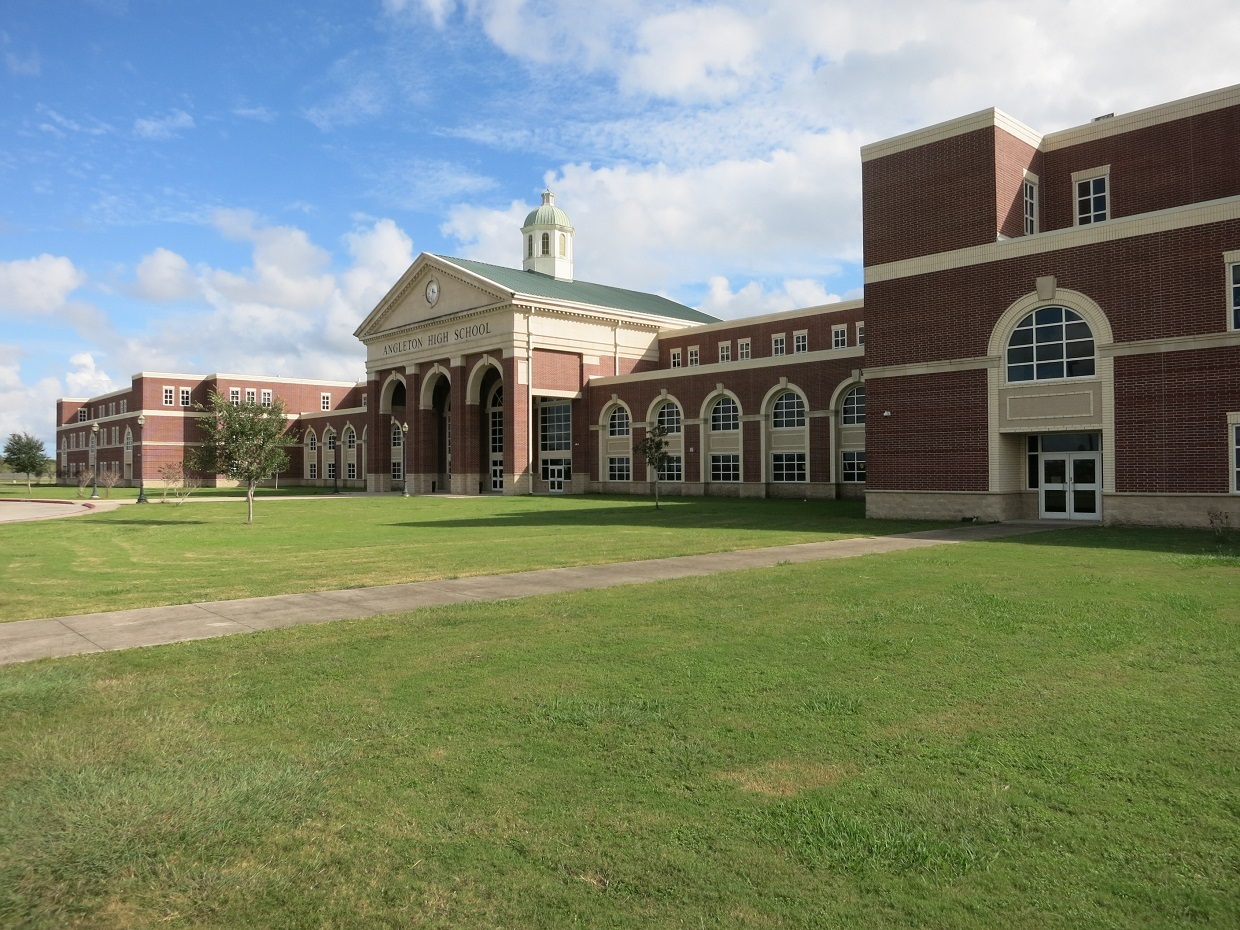
Angleton High School

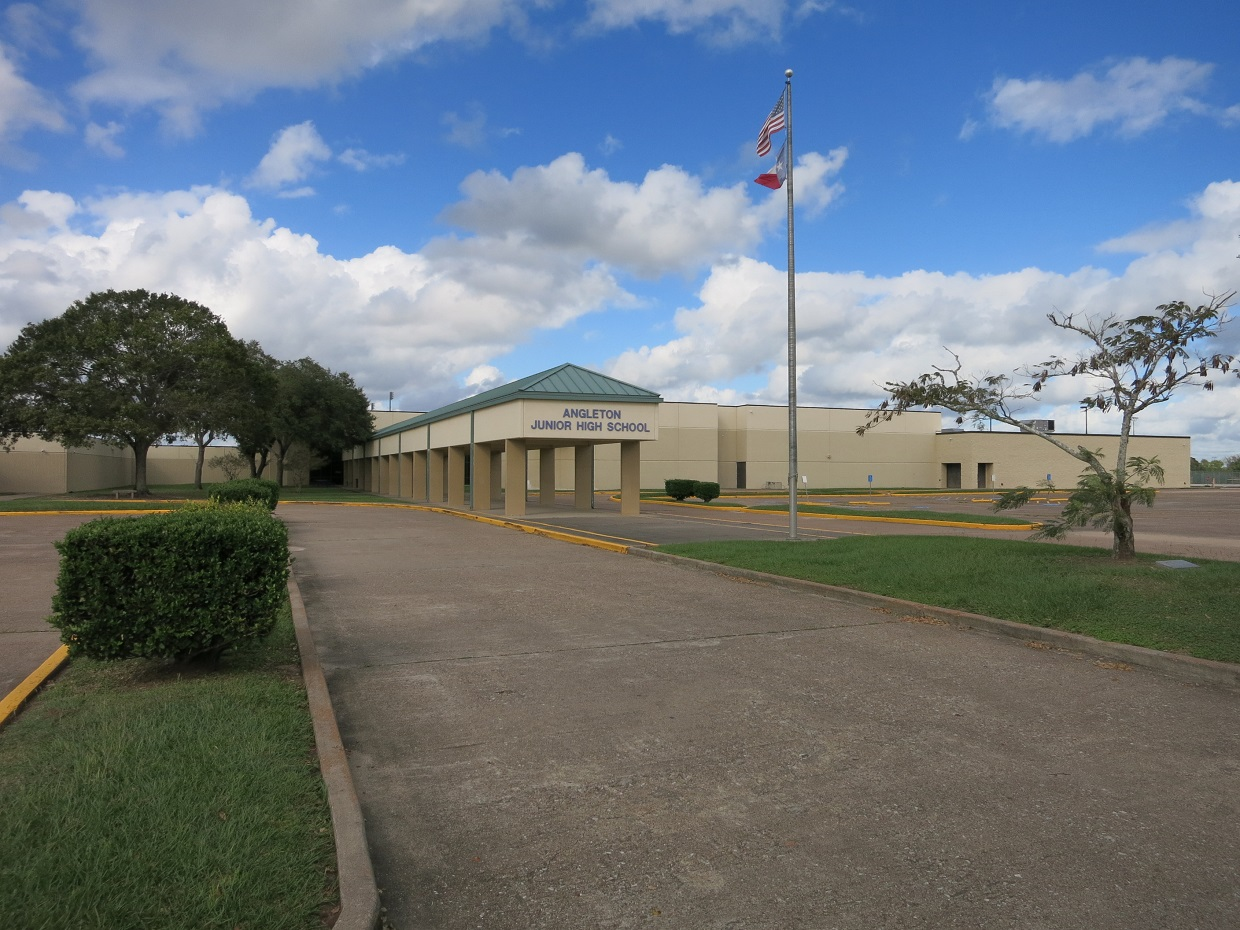
Angleton Junior High School

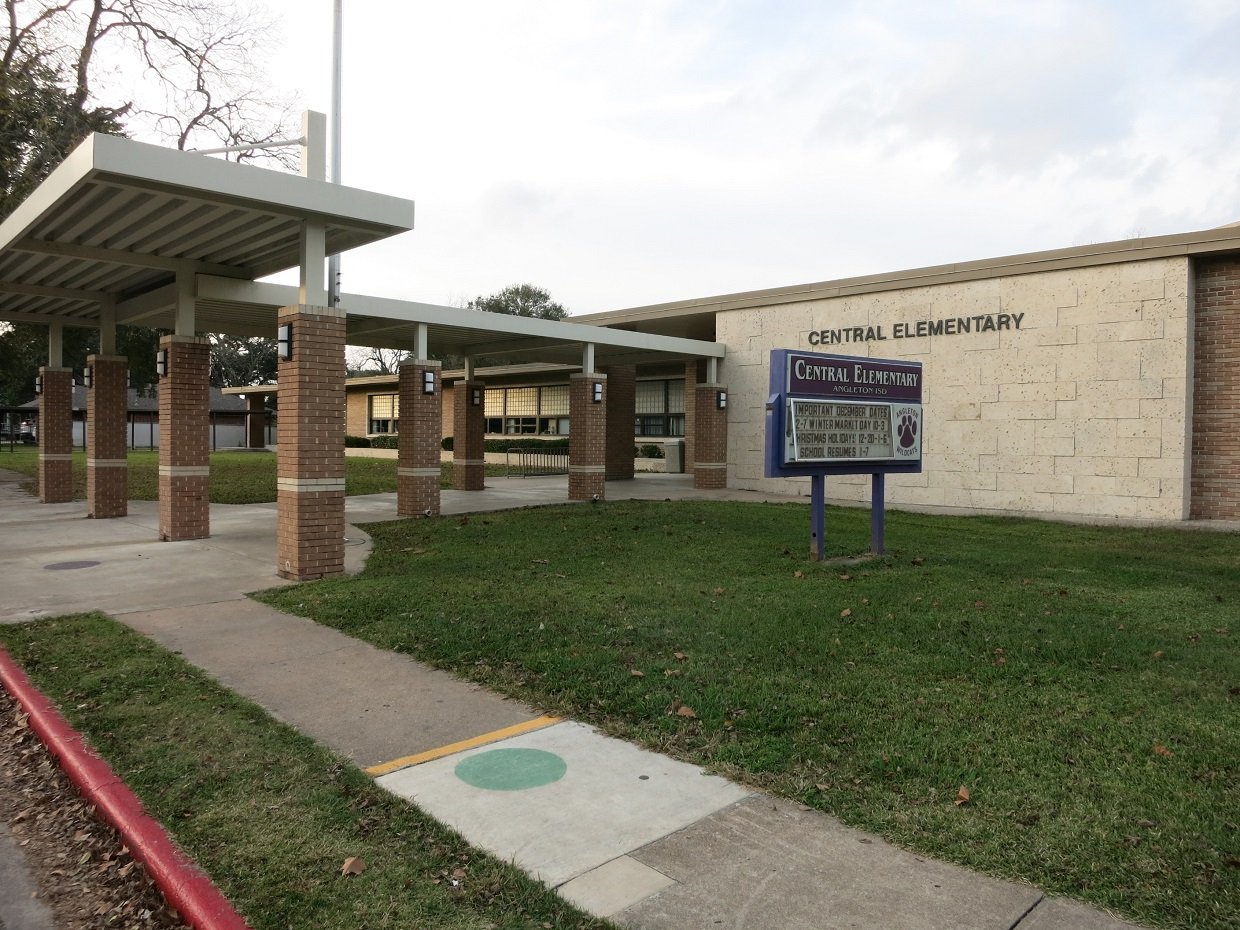
Central Elementary School

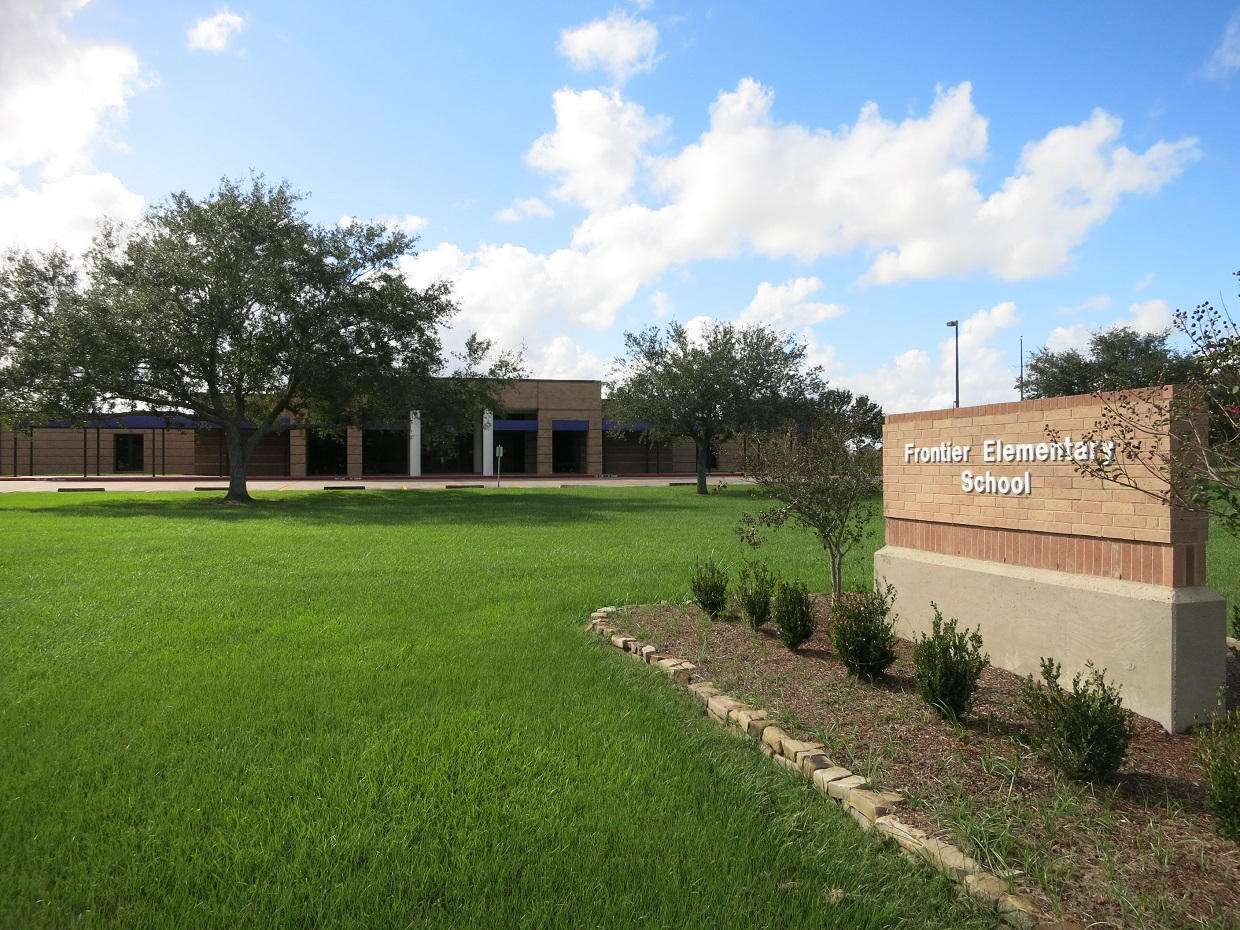
Frontier Elementary School

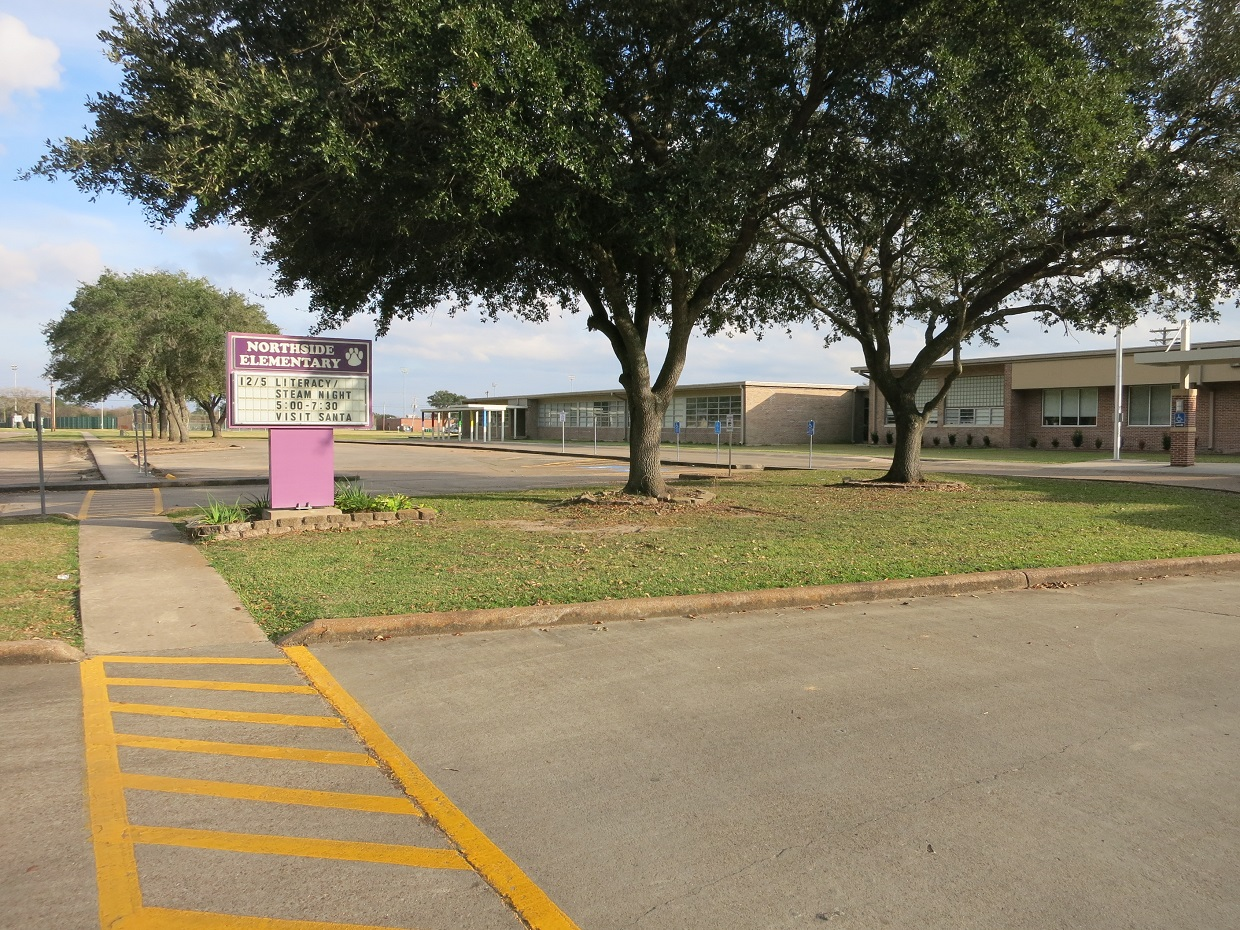
Northside Elementary School

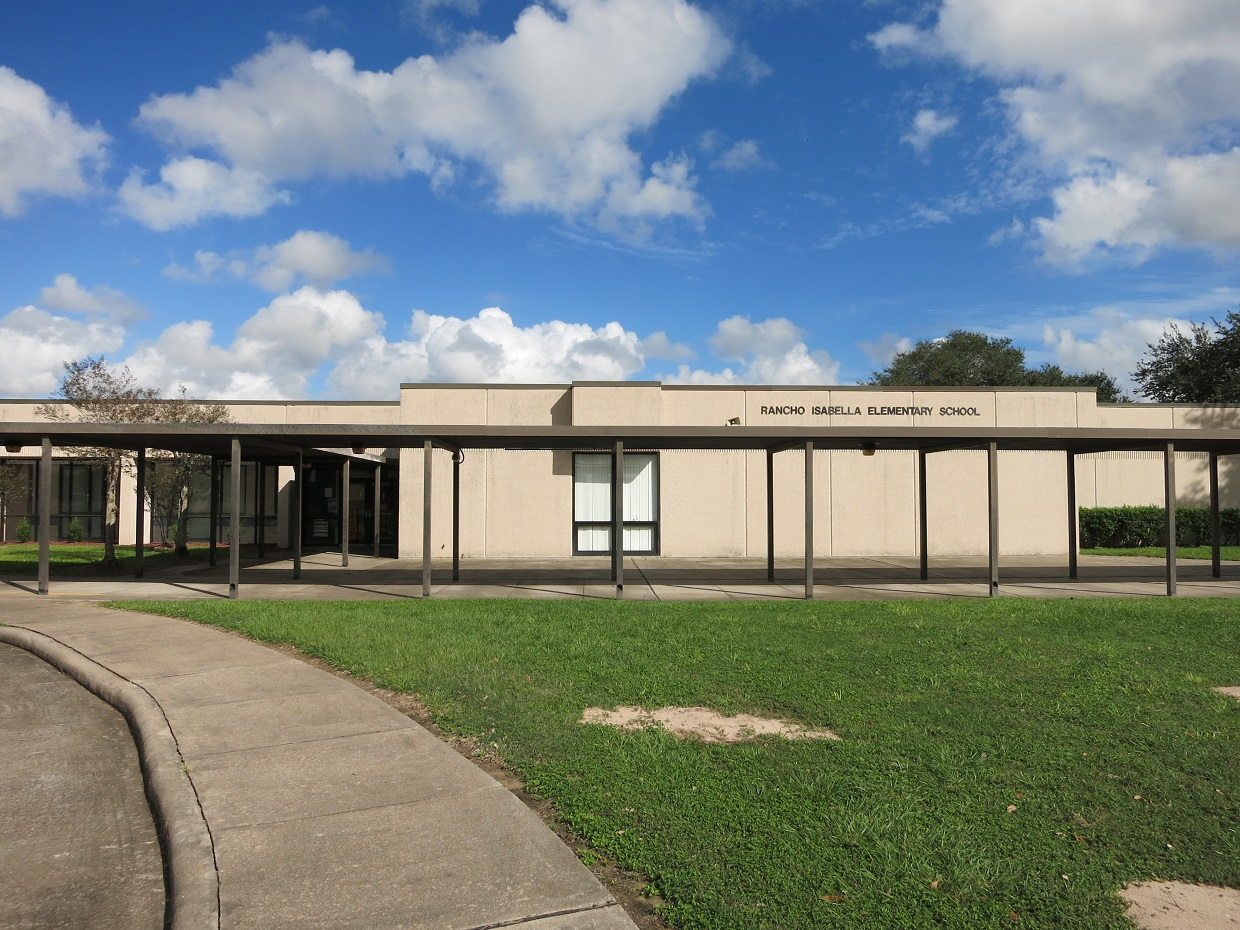
Rancho Isabella Elementary School

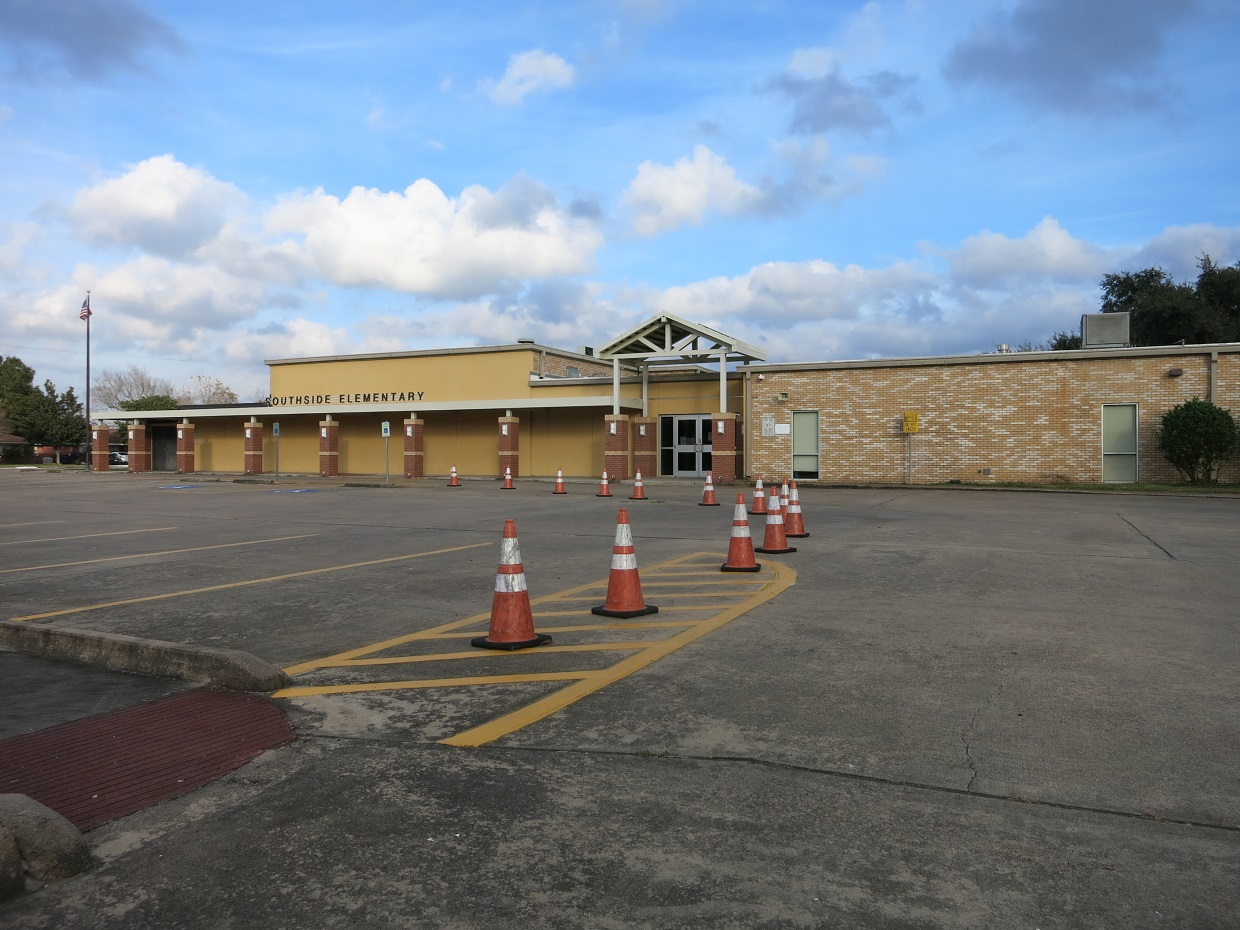
Southside Elementary School

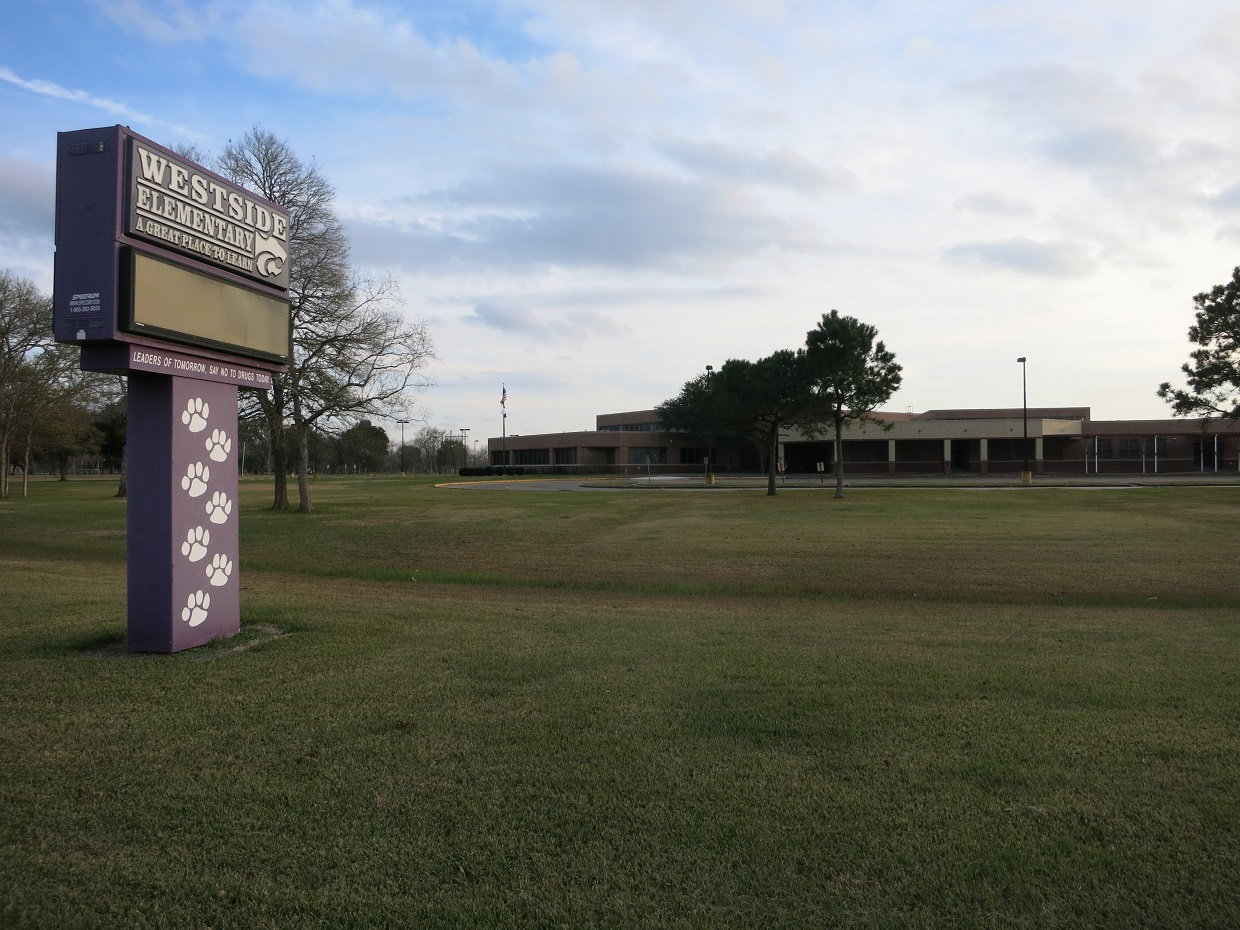
Westside Elementary School

=== Alternative instructional ===
- Angleton High School - ACE (Grades 9-12)
- Brazoria County Juvenile Detention (Grades 5-12)
- Brazoria County Alternative Education Center (Grades 3-12)
- Student Alternative Center (DAEP Grades 1-12)

== Special programs ==
=== Athletics ===
Angleton High School participates in the boys sports of baseball, basketball, football, soccer, and swimming. The school participates in the girls sports of basketball, soccer, softball, swimming, and volleyball. For the 2020 through 2022 school years, Angleton High School will play football in UIL Class 5A.

=== Operations ===
Students more than 2 miles (3.2 km) away from their schools are entitled to school bus services. Within the 2 miles, the district does not always grant school bus service.

== See also ==
- List of school districts in Texas
- List of high schools in Texas
