= Farm to Market Road 2004 =

State road in Brazoria and Galveston counties in Texas, United States

Farm to Market Road 2004

Route information
- Maintained by TxDOT
- Length: 46.901 mi (75.480 km)
- Existed: December, 17, 1953–present

Major junctions
- South end: SH 36 / FM 2611 east of Jones Creek
- SH 332 in Lake Jackson; SH 288 in Lake Jackson; SH 6 in Hitchcock; I-45 in La Marque
- North end: SH 3 in Texas City

Location
- Country: United States
- State: Texas
- Counties: Brazoria, Galveston

Highway system
- Highways in Texas; Interstate; US; State; Former; Toll; Loops; Spurs; FM/RM; Park; Rec
← FM 2003	→ FM 2005

Farm to Market Road 2004 (FM 2004) is a 46.901-mile (75.480 km) farm to market road in Brazoria and Galveston counties in Texas, United States.

== Route description ==
FM 2004 begins near the village of Jones Creek and the TDCJ Clemens Unit prison, at an intersection with SH 36; the roadway past SH 36 is FM 2611. The route travels to the northeast, crossing the Brazos River and entering Lake Jackson, where it intersects SH 332 and then the SH 288 expressway north of Brazos Mall. FM 2004 travels through Richwood before entering unincorporated areas of Brazoria County, south of Danbury and Liverpool, and north of the Brazoria National Wildlife Refuge.

The highway crosses a steep bridge over Chocolate Bayou and passes chemical plants before entering Galveston County. The route turns more to the north, crossing SH 6 in Hitchcock. The route begins a brief concurrency with FM 1764 in La Marque just prior to a junction with I-45. FM 1764 turns to the east past the I-45 junction, while FM 2004 resumes its northerly route through Texas City, passing of Mall of the Mainland before ending at SH 3.

In 2005, the Brazoria County section of FM 2004, from the Galveston County line to SH 36, was designated the Jason Oliff Memorial Highway in honor of Brazoria County Sheriff Deputy Jason Oliff. Oliff was killed on December 5, 2005, while placing flares in front of the BP Amoco plant on FM 2004 just southwest of the FM 2917 intersection.

== History ==
FM 2004 was first designated in Galveston County on December 17, 1952; its routing then was from SH 3 FM 1765. On January 16, 1953, the road was extended south to SH 6, replacing the section of FM 1765 south of its western terminus. It was extended to FM 1561 on June 28, 1963. The road was extended to SH 288 in Brazoria County on October 8, 1964, replacing most of FM 1561, which was cancelled. The remainder of FM 1561 north to SH 6 became part of FM 646. The southern terminus saw two more changes: a short extension from SH 288 to SH 332 in Lake Jackson on June 1, 1965, and an extension to the current terminus at SH 36 on September 29, 1977. TxDOT edited the designation by September 17, 1979, to indicate a discontinuity at FM 1764 (which had been there since designation); that amendment was repealed from the official description on October 16, 1989.

On June 27, 1995, the mileage of the section between SH 3 and SH 6 was transferred to Urban Road 2004 (UR 2004). The designation of that section reverted to FM 2004 with the elimination of the Urban Road system on November 15, 2018.

== Major intersections ==
County	Location	mi	km	Destinations	Notes
Brazoria		0.0	0.0	FM 2611 west – Hinkles Ferry, Cedar Lake	Continuation southwest from southern terminus
Brazoria		0.0	0.0	SH 36 south – Jones Creek, Freeport SH 36 north – Brazoria	Southern terminus
Brazoria	Lake Jackson	5.4	8.7	SH 332 east – Clute, Surfside Beach SH 332 west – Brazoria	
Brazoria	Lake Jackson	6.6	10.6	SH 288 north (Nolan Ryan Expressway) – Angleton SH 288 south (Nolan Ryan Expressway) – Clute, Freeport	Diamond interchange
Brazoria	Richwood	9.7	15.6	Bus. SH 288 north (Brazosport Boulevard North) – Angleton Bus. SH 288 south (Brazosport Boulevard North) – Clute	
Brazoria		13.3	21.4	FM 523 north – Angleton FM 523 south – Oyster Creek	
Brazoria		29.4	47.3	FM 2917 north – Chocolate Bayou, SH 35	T intersection
Galveston	Hitchcock	36.5	58.7	FM 646 north – Santa Fe, SH 6	T intersection
Galveston	Hitchcock	40.7	65.5	SH 6 north – Alvin, Houston SH 6 south – Hitchcock, I‑45	
Galveston	La Marque	42.4	68.2	FM 1765 west (Texas Avenue) – Santa Fe	T intersection
Galveston	La Marque	44.1	71.0	FM 1764 west – Santa Fe parking lot north – Bay Park Shopping Center	Southern end of FM 1764 concurrency
Galveston	La Marque	44.2	71.1	I-45 north (Gulf Freeway) – Houston I-45 south (Gulf Freeway) – Galveston	Interchange; I-45 exit 15
Galveston	Texas City	44.4	71.5	FM 1764 east (Emmett F. Lowry Expressway) – Texas City	T lintersection; northern end of FM 1764 concurrency
Galveston	Texas City	47.0	75.6	SH 3 north (Galveston Road) – Dickinson SH 3 south (Galveston Road) – La Marque	Northern terminus; T intersection
1.000 mi = 1.609 km; 1.000 km = 0.621 mi

== See also ==
- List of Farm to Market Roads in Texas
