= Texas's 25th House of Representatives district =

American legislative district

Texas's 25th State House of Representatives district
Representative
Cody Vasut; R–Angleton
since January 10th, 2023
- Demographics: 43% White; 19.1% Black; 29.8% Hispanic; 7.1% Asian
- Population (2020): 186,855

District 25 is a district in the Texas House of Representatives. It was created in the 3rd legislature (1849–1851).

The district encompasses exactly half of Brazoria County and includes the cities of Angleton, Lake Jackson, Clute, Richwood, and portions of Pearland. The rest of the population is dispersed throughout unincorporated areas.

== Elections ==
General Election 2022: District 25
Party	Candidate	Votes	%	±%
Republican	Cody Vasut	13,695	100	

General Election 2020: District 25
Party	Candidate	Votes	%	±%
Republican	Cody Vasut	48,492	71.6	
Democratic	Patrick Henry	19,261	28.4	
