= Farm to Market Road 1462 =

Road in Texas

Farm to Market Road 1462

Route information
- Maintained by TxDOT
- Length: 32.099 mi (51.658 km)

Major junctions
- West end: SH 36 in Damon
- SH 288
- East end: SH 35 in Alvin

Location
- Country: United States
- State: Texas
- Counties: Brazoria, Fort Bend

Highway system
- Highways in Texas; Interstate; US; State; Former; Toll; Loops; Spurs; FM/RM; Park; Rec
← FM 1461	→ FM 1463

Farm to Market Road 1462 (FM 1462) is a farm to market road located in Brazoria and Fort Bend counties, Texas.

== Route description ==
FM 1462 begins at SH 36 at the community of Damon in Brazoria County. The road follows a northeasterly path, entering Fort Bend County and turning to the east. It has a junction with FM 762, which provides access to Brazos Bend State Park and the George Observatory via PR 72. FM 1462 crosses over the Brazos River and returns to Brazoria County. Seven miles east of the bridge is Rosharon and the intersection of FM 521. The route then has an interchange with the SH 288 freeway. The route travels past several newer neighborhoods and subdivisions before entering Alvin and ending at an intersection with SH 35/future SH 99 near Alvin Community College.

== History ==
FM 1462 was originally designated in Brazoria County on July 14, 1949, connecting SH 288 near Rosharon to SH 35 in Alvin. The route was extended to the Brazos River crossing at the county line on September 27, 1960, and then through Fort Bend County and to SH 36 at Damon on October 10, 1961. The extension to Damon usurped the short-lived FM 2715 and the western portion of FM 762.

== Major intersections ==
County	Location	mi	km	Destinations	Notes
Brazoria	Damon	0.0	0.0	SH 36 – Needville, West Columbia	Western terminus
Fort Bend		7.9	12.7	FM 762 to PR 72 – Brazos Bend State Park	
Brazoria	Rosharon	18.0	29.0	FM 521 – Sandy Point, Bonney	
Brazoria		20.2	32.5	SH 288 (Nolan Ryan Expwy.) – Pearland, Lake Jackson	
Brazoria	Alvin	32.0	51.5	Bus. SH 35 – Alvin	
Brazoria	Alvin	32.1	51.7	SH 35 (Alvin Bypass) – Pearland, Angleton	Eastern terminus; SH 35 is planned to be co-signed with SH 99 in the future
1.000 mi = 1.609 km; 1.000 km = 0.621 mi
