= Texas State Highway 332 =

State highway in Texas

State Highway 332
- SH 332, highlighted in red

Route information
- Maintained by TxDOT
- Length: 15.646 mi (25.180 km) Total length of 20.4 mi (32.8 km) includes a 4.8 mi (7.7 km) concurrent section with SH 288
- Existed: 1956–present

Major junctions
- West end: SH 36 in Brazoria
- East end: Bluewater Highway in Surfside Beach

Location
- Country: United States
- State: Texas

Highway system
- Highways in Texas; Interstate; US; State; Former; Toll; Loops; Spurs; FM/RM; Park; Rec
← SH 331	→ SH 333

State Highway 332 (SH 332) is a 15.646-mile (25.180 km) state highway in the U.S. state of Texas. The highway includes a 4.8 mi (7.7 km) concurrent section with SH 288 that brings the total length to 20.4 miles (32.8 km). The highway begins at a junction with State Highway 36 (SH 36) in Brazoria and heads east to a junction with the Bluewater Highway in Surfside Beach.

== History ==
SH 332 was originally designated on September 25, 1939 as the bridge over the Intercoastal Canal. On January 12, 1950, it was transferred to FM 1460 which had been designated a year earlier to form the bridge to FM 523. On September 27, 1954, the eastern terminus was extended to an intersection with the Bluewater Highway, while the western terminus was extended to FM 521 on September 29, 1954 when FM 1605 was combined with the route. On October 24, 1956, the route was redesignated back to SH 332 and the western end was extended to SH 36 replacing part of FM 521. On August 15, 1989, a concurrency with SH 288 in Lake Jackson was created.

== Route description ==
SH 332 begins at a junction with SH 36 in Brazoria. It heads east from this junction to an intersection with FM 521. The highway continues to the east to an intersection with FM 2004 in Lake Jackson. Heading towards the east, the highway continues to an intersection SH 288. The highway intersects SH 288. It continues to the east to a junction with Business 288 in Clute. As the highway continues to the east, it intersects FM 523. SH 332 reaches its eastern terminus at the Bluewater Highway in Surfside Beach.

== Junction list ==
The entire route is in Brazoria County. All exits are unnumbered.

Location	mi	km	Destinations	Notes
Brazoria	0.0	0.0	SH 36 / FM 521 west	West end of FM 521 overlap; FM 521 continues along SH 36 south
Brazoria			Bridge over Brazos River	
Brazoria	1.4	2.3	FM 521 east – Bailey's Prairie	Interchange; no eastbound entrance; east end of FM 521 overlap
Lake Jackson	6.5	10.5	FM 2004	
Lake Jackson	7.6	12.2	SH 288 north (Nolan Ryan Expressway) / Oyster Creek Drive – Angleton, Houston	West end of SH 288 overlap
Lake Jackson	8.4	13.5	Oak Drive / Veteran's Memorial Parkway	Interchange; westbound exit for This Way and West Way, access to Brazosport Memorial Hospital
Lake Jackson	9.8	15.8	Plantation Drive	Interchange
Clute	11.0	17.7	Dixie Drive	Interchange
Clute	12.0	19.3	Main Street / Contractor Road / Copper Road	Interchange
Clute	13.0	20.9	SH 288 south / Bus. SH 288 north – Freeport, Angleton	Interchange; east end of SH 288 overlap; no access from mainlanes (ramps closed until August 2020)
Freeport	16.5	26.6	FM 523 – Oyster Creek	
Freeport			Bridge over Gulf Intracoastal Waterway	
Surfside Beach	20.4	32.8	Fort Velasco Drive / Bluewater Highway / County Road 257 – Galveston	Leads to Galveston via the San Luis Pass toll bridge
1.000 mi = 1.609 km; 1.000 km = 0.621 mi: Concurrency terminus
