= Texas State Highway 288 =

State highway in Texas

State Highway 288
- SH 288; mainline in red, business route in blue

Route information
- Length: 60.01 mi (Note: The certified mileage given is shorter than the actual mileage as TxDOT considers SH 288 to be discontinuous at rather than concurrent with SH 36.) (96.58 km)
- Existed: 1939–present

Major junctions
- South end: SH 36 / FM 1495 in Freeport
- SH 6 in Manvel; Beltway 8 / Sam Houston Tollway near Pearland; I-610 in Houston; I-69 / US 59 in Houston
- North end: I-45 in Houston

Location
- Country: United States
- State: Texas
- Counties: Brazoria, Harris

Highway system
- Highways in Texas; Interstate; US; State; Former; Toll; Loops; Spurs; FM/RM; Park; Rec
← SH 287	→ SH 289

State Highway 288 (SH 288) is a north–south highway in the southeastern portion of the U.S. state of Texas, between I-45 in downtown Houston and Freeport, where it terminates on FM 1495. The route was originally designated by 1939, replacing the southern portion of SH 19.

== Route description ==
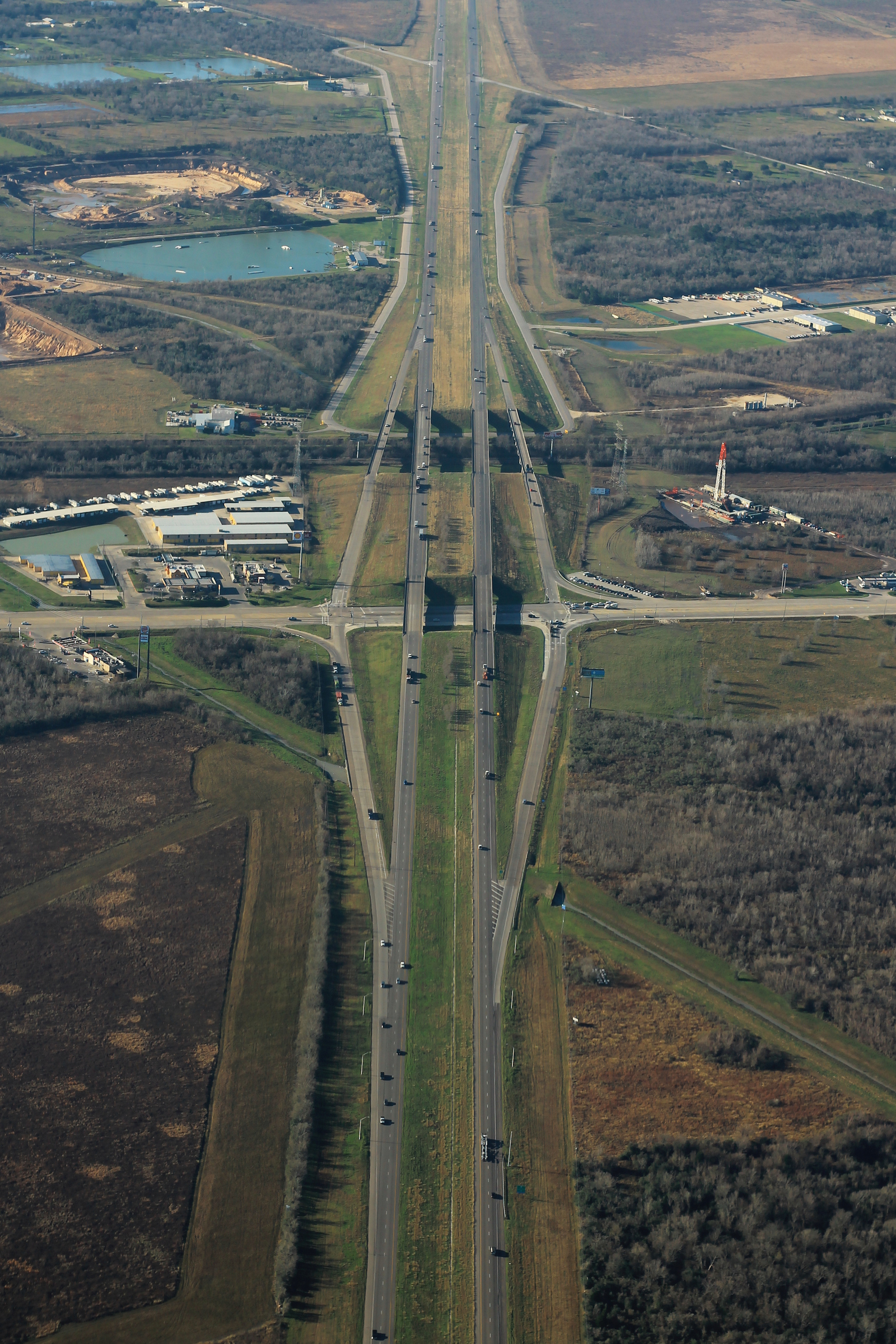
Interchange with Texas State Highway 6 at Iowa Colony

SH 288 begins in Freeport at the intersection with Farm to Market Road 1495, running concurrent with SH 36. It runs northwesterly along the Nolan Ryan Expressway up to an interchange south of Freeport where it separates from SH 36. It runs north along Brazosport Boulevard and becomes a freeway approaching the west end of SH 332 and SH 288 Business. It runs through Lake Jackson and up to the west side of Angleton, near the Texas Gulf Coast Regional Airport. It then continues north, intersecting SH 6 near Iowa Colony and then enters Harris County, where it is known as the South Freeway. There, it interchanges with the Sam Houston Tollway and then I-610. It enters Houston running next to Interstate 69/U.S. Route 59 before it reaches its northern terminus at Interstate 45. From Freeport to the Harris–Brazoria county line, it is referred to as the Nolan Ryan Expressway, in recognition of Baseball Hall of Fame pitcher Nolan Ryan who grew up in Alvin, Texas, which is not directly on this road. Brazoria County will be calling the tolled portion of the highway, located within the county, the Brazoria County Expressway.

== Toll lanes ==
To help alleviate congestion on SH 288, four toll lanes (two in each direction) were constructed in the median of the freeway. The lanes begin at County Road 58 in Manvel and terminate at I-69/US 59 in Houston for a total length of 15 miles (24.1 km). The lanes utilize open road tolling through the EZ TAG system. Construction of the lanes began on November 15, 2016, and they were opened on November 16, 2020.

The 10.7 miles (17.2 km) of express lanes in Harris County, dubbed Drive288, were constructed via a public–private partnership between the Texas Department of Transportation (TxDOT) and Blueridge Transportation Group, a consortium of six construction companies later purchased by ACS Group. As part of the partnership, Blueridge was permitted to collect toll revenue on their segment until 2068, as well as set toll rates. However, in 2024, TxDOT exercised an option to terminate the partnership early and revert the segment to state control.

The 5.2 miles (8.4 km) of express lanes in Brazoria County, dubbed the Brazoria County Expressway, are operated by the county government through the Brazoria County Toll Road Authority (BCTRA). BCTRA has proposed a second phase of the project, which will stretch about 10 miles (16 km) south to a planned extension of Grand Parkway (SH 99) in Rosharon.

== History ==
State Highway 288 was designated on September 26, 1939 as the renumbering of the portion of State Highway 19 south of downtown Houston. On August 1, 1962, SH 288 was extended to FM 1495. On June 25, 1981, SH 288 was rerouted from I-45 to MacGregor Way in Houston on the new freeway. The original routing ran southward along Almeda Road in Houston. The route traveled southward through Fresno, past the Houston Southwest Airport, before reaching Bonney. This entire portion of the route from US 90 Alt. southward was transferred to Farm to Market Road 521 and Spur 300 on December 14, 1981, as SH 288 was rerouted onto the new freeway from US 90 Alt. to Spur 300. The route then traveled east through downtown Angleton, continuing southeast before reaching Freeport. This original section is now part of County Road 543 and Farm to Market Road 523. SH 288 was redirected southward from Angleton when the city of Clute became more populated, then continued southward to a new intersection with State Highway 36 west of Freeport. On November 18, 1983, SH 288 was rerouted on the new freeway from MacGregor Way to US 90 Alt. The entire remaining section from FM 521 north of Angleton to Clute was transferred first to Texas State Highway 227 on September 26, 1986, and later Business Highway 288 on October 25, 1990 when the bypass around the western side of Lake Jackson opened. The section from Clute south to Freeport was transferred to SH 227, and the section concurrent with SH 36 became SH 36 on February 23, 1989. On August 15, 1989, SH 288 was extended south over part of SH 227 and concurrent with SH 36, restoring the lost section from Clute to Freeport.

== Major intersections ==
All exits are unnumbered.

County	Location	mi	km	Destinations	Notes
Brazoria	Freeport	0.0	0.0	FM 1495 – Port Freeport, Brazos Harbor	Southern termini of SH 288/SH 36; south end of SH 36 overlap
Brazoria	Freeport	1.3	2.1	SH 36 north – Jones Creek, West Columbia	Interchange; north end of SH 36 overlap
Brazoria	Freeport	3.5	5.6	FM 523 north / Gulf Boulevard – Surfside	
Brazoria		5.5	8.9	Frontage Road	South end of freeway; northbound exit and southbound entrance
Brazoria	Lake Jackson	5.7	9.2	Bus. SH 288-B north / SH 332 east – Clute Business District, Angleton, Surfside	South end of SH 332 overlap
Brazoria	Lake Jackson–Clute line	6.9	11.1	Main Street / Contractor Road / Copper Road	
Brazoria	Lake Jackson–Clute line	7.7	12.4	Dixie Drive	
Brazoria	Lake Jackson	9.0	14.5	Plantation Drive	
Brazoria	Lake Jackson	10.3	16.6	Oak Drive / Veterans Memorial Parkway / This Way / West Way	Access to Brazosport Memorial Hospital
Brazoria	Lake Jackson	11.2	18.0	SH 332 west (Oyster Creek Drive) / Abner Jackson Parkway / This Way	North end of SH 332 overlap
Brazoria	Lake Jackson	12.2	19.6	FM 2004 – Richwood	
Brazoria	Angleton	16.7	26.9	County Road 220 – Brazoria Airport	
Brazoria	Angleton	18.5	29.8	County Road 290	Southbound exit and northbound entrance
Brazoria	Angleton	19.3	31.1	SH 35 – Angleton, West Columbia, Bay City	
Brazoria	Angleton	20.8	33.5	County Road 44	Southbound access via FM 523 exit and Frontage Road
Brazoria	Angleton	21.5	34.6	FM 523 – Alvin, Angleton	North end of freeway
Brazoria		26.0	41.8	Bus. SH 288 to FM 521 – Rosharon, Angleton	Interchange
Brazoria		32.6	52.5	FM 1462 – Rosharon, Alvin	South end of freeway
Brazoria				SH 99 Toll (Grand Parkway)	Proposed interchange
Brazoria		34	55	County Road 60 (Schovajsa Road)	
Brazoria	Iowa Colony	36.7	59.1	County Road 63 (Airline Road Number 2)	
Brazoria	Iowa Colony	37.7	60.7	County Road 64 (Davenport Parkway)	
Brazoria	Iowa Colony	38.7	62.3	County Road 56 (Meridiana Parkway)	
Brazoria	Iowa Colony	39.7	63.9	County Road 57 (Cedar Rapids Parkway)	
Brazoria	Iowa Colony	41.1	66.1	County Road 48 (Iowa Colony Boulevard)	
Brazoria	Manvel	42.0	67.6	SH 6 – Alvin, Sugar Land	
Brazoria	Manvel	43.5	70.0	Del Bello Boulevard	
Brazoria	Manvel	44.4	71.5	County Road 58	
Brazoria	Manvel	45.0	72.4	SH 288 Toll begins (Brazoria County Expressway)	South end of SH 288 Toll Lanes
Brazoria	Manvel	45.6	73.4	County Road 101 (Bailey Road / Pomona Parkway)	
Brazoria	Pearland	46.5	74.8	Magnolia Parkway	Formerly Southfork Drive
Brazoria	Pearland	47.1	75.8	FM 518 (Broadway Street)	Former FM 3344
Brazoria	Pearland			Hughes Ranch Road / Discovery Bay Drive	Access from Toll Lanes only; southbound exit and northbound entrance
Brazoria–Harris county line	Pearland	48.4	77.9	FM 2234 (Shadow Creek Parkway) / McHard Road	
Harris	Pearland	50.2	80.8	Sam Houston Tollway	Northbound left exit and southbound left entrance
Harris	Pearland–Houston line	50.4	81.1	Beltway 8 (Frontage Road)	
Harris	Pearland–Houston line			Sam Houston Tollway	Access from Toll Lanes only; southbound right exit and northbound right entrance
Harris	Houston	51.6	83.0	Almeda-Genoa Road	
Harris	Houston	52.6	84.7	Orem Drive	
Harris	Houston	53.6	86.3	Airport Boulevard	
Harris	Houston	54.5	87.7	Reed Road	
Harris	Houston	55.4	89.2	Bellfort Avenue / Holmes Road	Northbound exit and southbound entrance
Harris	Houston	55.7	89.6	I-610	I-610 exit 38A westbound, 38A-C eastbound
Harris	Houston	57.0	91.7	Holly Hall Street	Southbound exit and northbound entrance
Harris	Houston	57.6	92.7	US 90 Alt. (Old Spanish Trail) / Yellowstone Boulevard / Holcombe Boulevard	
Harris	Houston			Holcombe Boulevard west – Texas Medical Center	Access from Toll Lanes only; northbound right exit and southbound right entrance
Harris	Houston	58.5	94.1	South MacGregor Way / North MacGregor Way – Texas Medical Center, Houston Zoo	
Harris	Houston	58.9	94.8	Binz Street / Calumet Street	Southbound access via Southmore Boulevard exit
Harris	Houston			SH 288 Toll south	Southbound exit only
Harris	Houston	59.3	95.4	Southmore Boulevard / Blodgett Street	
Harris	Houston	60.1	96.7	I-69 south / US 59 south – Victoria	I-69 exits 128/129A northbound
Harris	Houston	60.2	96.9	I-69 north / US 59 north – Cleveland	Northbound exit and southbound entrance; I-69 exit 128B; exit to Elgin/Tuam closed until December 2025
Harris	Houston			SH 288 Toll ends (Brazoria County Expressway)	North end of SH 288 Toll Lanes; northbound entrance only
Harris	Houston	60.3	97.0	Chenevert Street – Downtown Houston	Northbound exit and southbound entrance
Harris	Houston	61.1	98.3	I-45 – Dallas, Galveston, IAH, Hobby Airport	Northern terminus; I-45 exits 46A-B
1.000 mi = 1.609 km; 1.000 km = 0.621 mi: Concurrency terminus; Electronic toll collection; Incomplete access; Unopened

== Business route ==
Business State Highway 288-B
- Location: Lake Jackson-Bonney
- Length: 20.271 mi (32.623 km)
- Existed: 1990–present

SH 288 has one business route.

Business State Highway 288-B (Bus. SH 288) is a bypass of SH 288 through Angleton, Richwood and Clute. The route was created in 1987 as SH 227, which was redesignated as Business SH 288-B on October 25, 1990.

=== Major junctions ===
The entire route is in Brazoria County.

Location	mi	km	Destinations	Notes
Lake Jackson	0.00	0.00	SH 288 south	Southern terminus
Clute	0.00	0.00	SH 332 east – Surfside	Interchange
Clute	0.00	0.00	SH 332 west / SH 288 north – Lake Jackson	Interchange; southbound exit and northbound entrance
Clute	1.5	2.4	Whitten Street	Partial interchange via northbound exit ramp and connector road southbound; no northbound entrance
Clute	1.6	2.6	Wilson Road / Leder Street / Mockingbird Street	Partial interchange via northbound entrance ramp and connector road southbound; no northbound exit
Richwood	5.5	8.9	FM 2004 – Santa Fe	
Angleton	11.2– 11.4	18.0– 18.3	Loop 274 north	Interchange; southern terminus of Loop 274; northbound left exit and southbound left entrance; serves as a bypass of downtown Angleton
Angleton	11.8	19.0	SH 35 – Bay City, Alvin	
Angleton	12.6	20.3	Loop 274 south	Northern terminus of Loop 274
Angleton	14.4	23.2	FM 523 / SH 35 Byp.	
	18.6	29.9	SH 288 – Houston, Lake Jackson	Interchange
	20.3	32.7	FM 521 – Houston, Brazoria	Northern terminus
1.000 mi = 1.609 km; 1.000 km = 0.621 mi: Incomplete access
