= Bonney, Texas =

Village in Brazoria County, Texas, United States

- Village
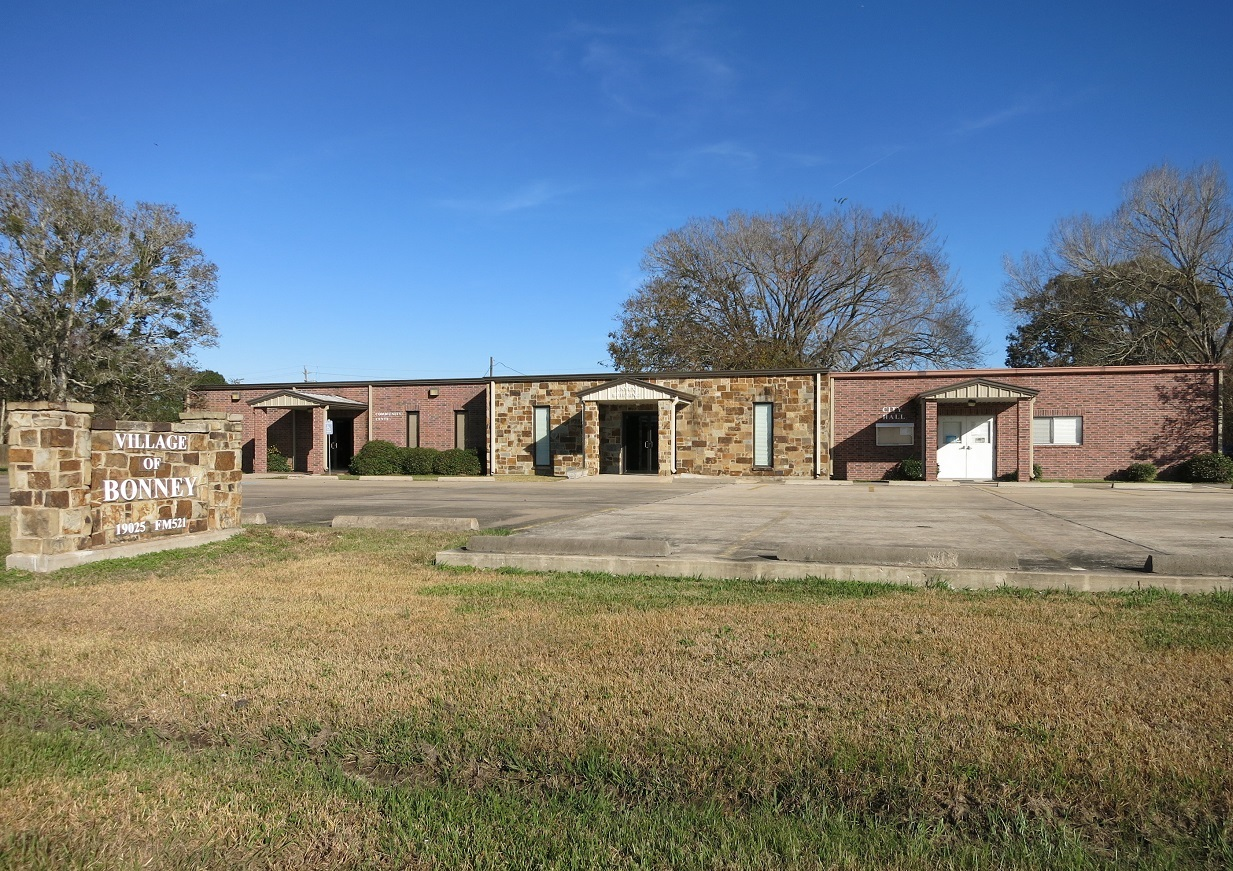
- Bonney municipal buildings, December 2018
- Interactive map of Bonney, Texas
- Coordinates: 29°18′40″N 95°27′3″W
- Country: United States
- State: Texas
- County: Brazoria

Area
  - Total: 1.96 sq mi (5.08 km^{2})
  - Land: 1.96 sq mi (5.08 km^{2})
  - Water: 0 sq mi (0.00 km^{2})
- Elevation: 46 ft (14 m)

Population (2020)
  - Total: 180
  - Density: 92/sq mi (35/km^{2})
- Time zone: UTC-6 (Central (CST))
  - Summer (DST): UTC-5 (CDT)
- ZIP code: 77515
- Area code: 979
- FIPS code: 48-09388
- GNIS feature ID: 1379443
- Website: www.bonneytexas.gov

Bonney is a village in Brazoria County, Texas, United States. The population was 180 at the 2020 census, making it the smallest village in Texas. Bonney is, however, approximately fifteen times larger than the smallest city and the smallest town in Texas.

== History ==
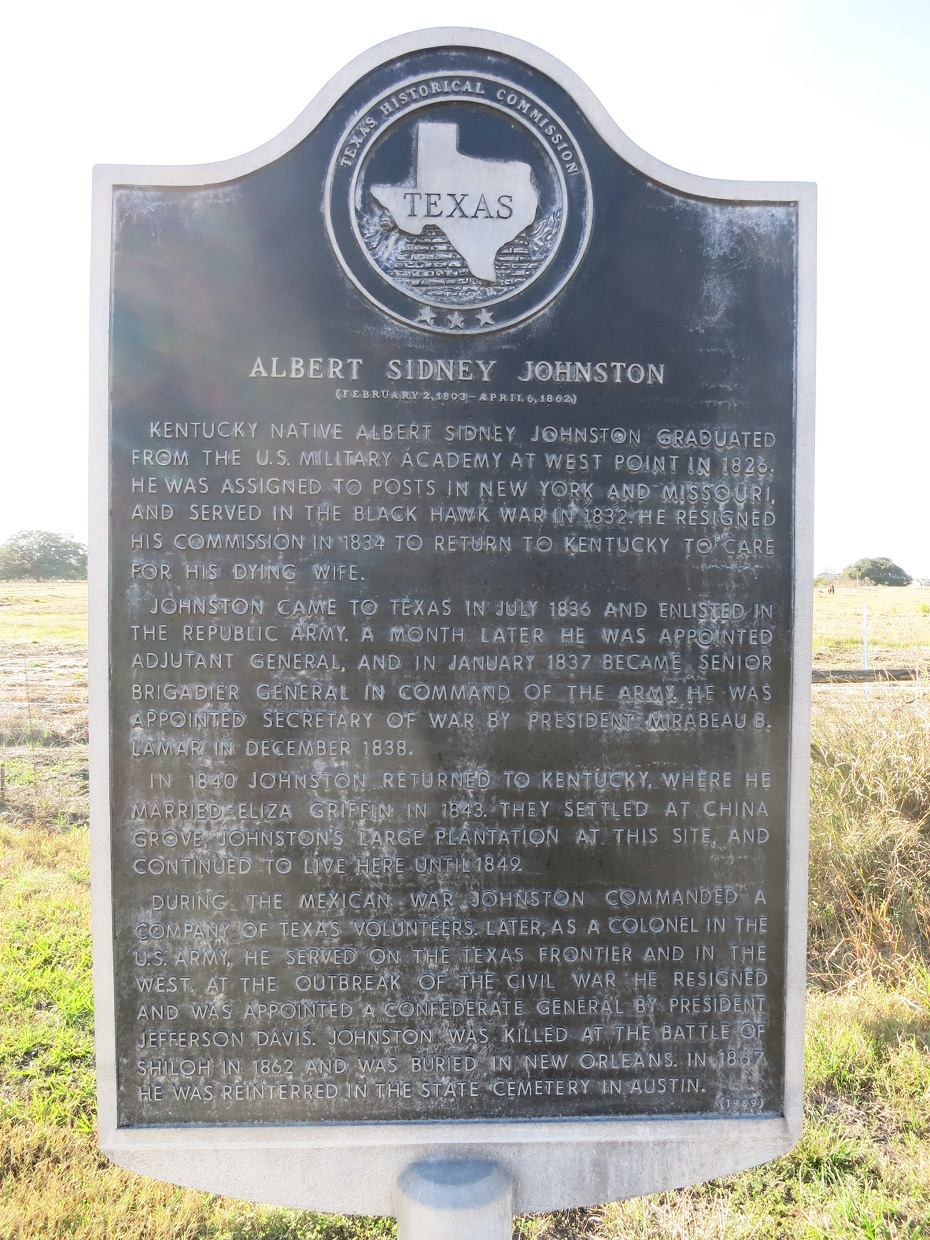
Albert Sidney Johnston historical marker on FM 521 is 200 yards (180 m) south of the Bonney municipal buildings

Bonney was founded in 1873 as a station on the International–Great Northern Railroad. It was named after a conductor who worked on the Houston Tap and Brazoria Railway. In 1889 a post office opened and the following year a new general store was added. The next six years saw the opening of a school, three more businesses, a cotton gin, and a telegraph office. In 1895 there were 75 persons living in Bonney. In 1906 the school had one teacher and twenty students. The post office closed in 1920. By 1955 the village had one business and 25 residents. In 1988 the population was 99. Two years later the census recorded 339 residents and in 2000 the number increased to 384.

After his first wife died in 1835. West Point graduate Albert Sidney Johnston moved to the Republic of Texas in 1836. In January 1837 he was the senior brigadier general in the Texas army. In December 1838 he was appointed the republic's Secretary of War. In 1840, he left Texas for his native Kentucky where he married his second wife Eliza Griffin and returned to Texas in 1843. That year, Johnston bought the China Grove plantation from Warren D. C. Hall and operated the place until 1849. He sold it in 1852. He returned to the United States Army in 1849 and had a distinguished career until he resigned in 1861 to join the Confederate States of America. He was killed leading a Confederate army at the Battle of Shiloh in 1862.

== Geography ==
Bonney is located in north-central Brazoria County at 29°18′40″N 95°27′3″W (29.311069, –95.450918). It is 10 miles (16 km) north of Angleton, the county seat, and 13 miles (21 km) south of Arcola. Texas State Highway 288, a four-lane freeway, passes 1 mile (1.6 km) east of the village, leading 33 miles (53 km) north to downtown Houston.

According to the United States Census Bureau, Bonney has a total area of 1.7 square miles (4.3 km^{2}), all land.

== Demographics ==
Historical population
Census	Pop.	Note	%±
1980	94		—
1990	339		260.6%
2000	384		13.3%
2010	310		−19.3%
2020	180		−41.9%
U.S. Decennial Census; 2020 Census

As of the census of 2000, there were 384 people, 126 households, and 101 families residing in the village. The population density was 231.8 inhabitants per square mile (89.5/km^{2}). There were 136 housing units at an average density of 82.1 per square mile (31.7/km^{2}). The racial makeup of the village was 69.53% White, 10.16% African American, 1.04% Native American, 1.30% Asian, 14.32% from other races, and 3.65% from two or more races. Hispanic or Latino of any race were 29.95% of the population.

There were 126 households, out of which 54.0% had children under the age of 18 living with them, 67.5% were married couples living together, 8.7% had a female householder with no husband present, and 19.8% were non-families. 15.1% of all households were made up of individuals, and 1.6% had someone living alone who was 65 years of age or older. The average household size was 3.05 and the average family size was 3.45.

In the village, the population was spread out, with 34.1% under the age of 18, 8.3% from 18 to 24, 37.2% from 25 to 44, 15.9% from 45 to 64, and 4.4% who were 65 years of age or older. The median age was 32 years. For every 100 females, there were 112.2 males. For every 100 females age 18 and over, there were 110.8 males.

The median income for a household in the village was $41,750, and the median income for a family was $44,688. Males had a median income of $26,389 versus $22,885 for females. The per capita income for the village was $15,368. About 3.1% of families and 3.0% of the population were below the poverty line, including 2.6% of those under age 18 and none of those age 65 or over.

== Government and infrastructure ==
The Rosharon Volunteer Fire Department provides fire services for Bonney.

== Education ==
Students in Bonney are served by the Angleton Independent School District, including Angleton High School.

The Texas Legislature designated portions of Angleton ISD that by September 1, 1995, had not been annexed by Alvin Community College as in the Brazosport College zone. As Bonney is not in the maps of Alvin CC, it is in the Brazosport College zone.

== See also ==
- List of municipalities in Texas
