= Richwood, Texas =

- City
- Motto: "Rich in History, Focused on the Future"
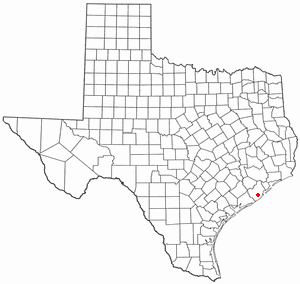
- Location of Richwood, Texas

- Coordinates: 29°3′41″N 95°24′45″W
- Country: United States
- State: Texas
- County: Brazoria

Area
  - Total: 4.75 sq mi (12.31 km^{2})
  - Land: 4.47 sq mi (11.57 km^{2})
  - Water: 0.29 sq mi (0.75 km^{2})
- Elevation: 16 ft (5 m)

Population (2020)
  - Total: 4,781
  - Density: 892.9/sq mi (344.74/km^{2})
- Time zone: UTC-6 (Central (CST))
  - Summer (DST): UTC-5 (CDT)
- FIPS code: 48-61904
- GNIS feature ID: 1380437
- Website: www.richwoodtx.gov

Richwood is a city in Brazoria County, Texas, United States. Its population was 4,781 at the 2020 census.

== Geography ==
Richwood is located in south-central Brazoria County at 29°3′41″N 95°24′45″W (29.061512, –95.412597). It is bordered to the southwest by Oyster Creek, which separates it from the cities of Lake Jackson and Clute. The city extends to the northeast, along Bastrop Bayou. Angleton, the Brazoria County seat, is 8 miles (13 km) to the north, and Freeport on the Gulf of Mexico is 8 miles (13 km) to the south.

According to the United States Census Bureau, Richwood has a total area of 3.1 square miles (8.1 km^{2}), of which 0.04 square miles (0.1 km^{2}), or 1.30%, is covered by water.

== Demographics ==
Historical population
| Census | Pop. | Note | %± |
|---|---|---|---|
| 1960 | 649 | | — |
| 1970 | 1,452 | | 123.7% |
| 1980 | 2,591 | | 78.4% |
| 1990 | 2,732 | | 5.4% |
| 2000 | 3,012 | | 10.2% |
| 2010 | 3,510 | | 16.5% |
| 2020 | 4,781 | | 36.2% |
U.S. Decennial Census

As of the 2020 census, Richwood had a population of 4,781.

=== Racial and ethnic composition ===
Racial composition as of the 2020 census
| Race | Number | Percent |
|---|---|---|
| White | 2,749 | 57.5% |
| Black or African American | 375 | 7.8% |
| American Indian and Alaska Native | 48 | 1.0% |
| Asian | 115 | 2.4% |
| Native Hawaiian and Other Pacific Islander | 1 | 0.0% |
| Some other race | 710 | 14.9% |
| Two or more races | 783 | 16.4% |
| Hispanic or Latino (of any race) | 1,886 | 39.4% |

Richwood racial composition as of 2020 (NH = Non-Hispanic) (Note: Note: the US Census treats Hispanic/Latino as an ethnic category. This table excludes Latinos from the racial categories and assigns them to a separate category. Hispanics/Latinos can be of any race.)
| Race | Number | Percentage |
|---|---|---|
| White (NH) | 2,262 | 47.31% |
| Black or African American (NH) | 344 | 7.2% |
| Native American or Alaska Native (NH) | 22 | 0.46% |
| Asian (NH) | 111 | 2.32% |
| Pacific Islander (NH) | 1 | 0.02% |
| Some other race (NH) | 23 | 0.48% |
| Multiracial (NH) | 132 | 2.76% |
| Hispanic or Latino | 1,886 | 39.45% |
| Total | 4,781 | |

=== 2020 census ===
The median age was 32.4 years, 25.7% of residents were under the age of 18, and 10.1% of residents were 65 years of age or older. For every 100 females there were 100.7 males, and for every 100 females age 18 and over there were 100.2 males age 18 and over. The 2020 census reported that 93.3% of residents lived in urban areas, while 6.7% lived in rural areas. There were 1,899 households in Richwood, including 889 families; 35.3% had children under the age of 18 living in them. Of all households, 46.8% were married-couple households, 24.0% were households with a male householder and no spouse or partner present, and 22.2% were households with a female householder and no spouse or partner present. About 28.4% of all households were made up of individuals and 6.0% had someone living alone who was 65 years of age or older. There were 2,275 housing units, of which 16.5% were vacant. The homeowner vacancy rate was 2.5% and the rental vacancy rate was 26.9%.

=== 2000 census ===
As of the 2000 census, 3,012 people, 1,138 households, and 825 families lived in the city. The population density was 1,922.5 inhabitants per square mile (742.3/km^{2}). The 1,254 housing units had an average density of 800.4 per square mile (309.0/km^{2}). The racial makeup of the city was 78.19% White, 8.50% African American, 0.37% Native American, 0.50% Asian, 0.07% Pacific Islander, 9.26% from other races, and 3.12% from two or more races. Hispanics or Latinos of any race were 23.37% of the population.

Of the 1,138 households, 40.3% had children under 18 living with them, 58.2% were married couples living together, 9.9% had a female householder with no husband present, and 27.5% were not families. About 22.8% of all households were made up of individuals, and 2.5% had someone living alone who was 65 or older. The average household size was 2.65 and the average family size was 3.13.

In the city, the age distribution was 28.8% under 18, 12.8% from 18 to 24, 31.9% from 25 to 44, 20.6% from 45 to 64, and 6.0% who were 65 or older. The median age was 29 years. For every 100 females, there were 99.3 males. For every 100 females 18 and over, there were 98.6 males.

The median income for a household in the city was $45,000, and for a family was $54,280. Males had a median income of $39,911 versus $22,773 for females. The per capita income for the city was $19,181. About 9.1% of families and 10.5% of the population were below the poverty line, including 13.0% of those under 18 and 1.7% of those 65 or over.

== Education ==
The city is served by the Brazosport Independent School District.

- Most areas are zoned to Polk Elementary School, while some are zoned to Griffith Elementary School (both prekindergarten - grade 4).
- Those zoned to Polk and Griffith are zoned to Clute Intermediate School (grades 5–8) and Brazoswood High School (grades 9–12).

Richwood is also served by Brazosport College; the Texas Legislature designated the Brazosport ISD as in the Brazosport College zone.

Richwood is part of the Brazoria County Library System.
