= Texas State Highway 3 =

State highway in Galveston and Harris counties in Texas, United States

State Highway 3
- SH 3 highlighted in red

Route information
- Maintained by TxDOT
- Length: 30.4 mi (48.9 km)
- Existed: August 20, 1952–present

Major junctions
- South end: SH 146 in La Marque
- Beltway 8 / Sam Houston Tollway near Ellington Field
- North end: I-45 in Houston

Location
- Country: United States
- State: Texas

Highway system
- Highways in Texas; Interstate; US; State; Former; Toll; Loops; Spurs; FM/RM; Park; Rec
← RE 2	→ Spur 3

State Highway 3 (SH 3) is a state highway in the U.S. state of Texas that runs from Interstate 45 in Houston near William P. Hobby Airport to State Highway 146, 9.9 miles (15.9 km) northwest of Galveston. For most of its length, SH 3 parallels I-45 and runs alongside the former Galveston, Houston and Henderson Railroad lines.

== Route description ==
SH 3 begins in Galveston County, south of La Marque near the Texas City Industrial Complex at a junction with SH 146. The highway heads to the northwest through La Marque intersecting FM 519 and FM 1765 before an interchange with FM 1764 (Emmett F. Lowry Expressway). The highway roughly parallels to the east of I-45 as it heads towards Dickinson. In Dickinson, the highway intersects FM 517 and FM 646 (future SH 99) before entering the League City city limits. In League City, SH 3 has junctions with SH 96 and FM 518, and head northwest into Harris County.

The first junction in Harris County is with NASA Road 1, which provides access to the Lyndon B. Johnson Space Center. The highway continues to the northwest to an intersection with FM 2351 and passes along the western boundary of Ellington Field. Heading northwest, the highway enters Houston city limits and has a junction with Beltway 8 (Sam Houston Tollway). The highway continues to the northwest through South Houston until it reaches an intersection with Winkler Drive. The highway turns to the west and follows Winkler Drive to its northern terminus at an interchange with I-45.

== History ==
Historic SH 3

SH 3 was one of the original twenty five state highways proposed on June 21, 1917, overlaid on top of the Southern National Highway. From 1917, the routing followed present day U.S. Highway 90, from Orange to Houston, U.S. Highway 90 Alternate to Eagle Lake, FM 102 to Columbus, U.S. Highway 90 to Waelder, SH 97 to Gonzales, U.S. Highway 90 Alternate to Seguin, and U.S. Highway 90 through San Antonio to Del Rio. On August 15, 1917, a more direct route along current US 90 between Waelder and Seguin was proposed. On November 21, 1917, the route was decided to go through Gonzales. On February 20, 1918, an alternate route from Seguin through Harwood to Waelder was added. The road at this time also had numerous alternate routes simultaneously marked as SH 3, along with occasionally signed SH 3A routes (although most of those routes were given their own numbers by the 1930s). On August 21, 1923, its route was extended through Sanderson to Alpine, it then headed northwest to Fort Davis, north to Balmorhea, and then west to a final terminus at San Martine, replacing parts of SH 12, SH 17A, and SH 27.

In 1926, US 90 was routed over SH 3 to Alpine. On May 1, 1931, SH 3 was rerouted from Alpine to end in Van Horn, replacing part of SH 54, with the old route to San Martine transferred to SH 118, SH 17 and SH 27. SH 3 Spur was created on November 18, 1938 from SH 3 to the Uvalde Fish Hatchery. On May 23, 1939, SH 3 Spur was designated to Langtry. While the routes were marked concurrently, on September 26, 1939, SH 3 was truncated to a small route running from Seguin, Gonzales to Waelder. The two routes designated SH 3 Spur became Spur 1 (Uvalde) and Spur 25 (Langtry). On March 28, 1952, the original route ceased to exist, with the section from US 90 west of Seguin to Gonzales transferred to US 90A and the section from Gonzales to Waelder transferred to SH 97. The present day routing was assigned on August 20, 1952.

SH 3 is sometimes referred to as Old Galveston Road, indicating its function as a thoroughfare between Houston and Galveston.

== Spur routes ==
Numerous spur routes were created along the main routing of SH 3, especially during the 1920s:

Historic SH 3A

State Highway 3-A was a state highway proposed on July 9, 1917, splitting from the main route at Houston and roughly parallelling it to the north through La Grange and ending at San Marcos. On October 8, 1917, the routing had changed slightly, now veering further north from La Grange to Bastrop. On December 17, 1918, SH 20 had been rerouted away from Bastrop, so SH 3A extended west to Austin, replacing a portion of SH 20. On August 21, 1923, this routing had been renumbered as SH 71 west of La Grange and SH 73 (now I-10) east of La Grange. SH 3A was reassigned to an alternate routing of SH 3 that was under construction between San Antonio and Waelder. By 1938, the route was limited to the section between Seguin and Waelder, and on September 26, 1939 was transferred to US 90.

Historic SH 3B

State Highway 3-B was a spur route created on March 19, 1918. The route crossed the main route of SH 3 at Schulenberg. The route travelled south from Schulenberg through Hallettsville to Cuero. On March 17, 1919, SH 3-B extended north through La Grange to Caldwell. On March 18, 1919, a split travelling both southwest to Kenedy and south to Goliad was added. On August 21, 1923, the route was renumbered as SH 72, which was shortened to end in Cuero with the branches south of Cuero cancelled. (parts later US 77).

Historic SH 3C

State Highway 3-C was designated on March 17, 1919 as a proposed spur off of SH 3A, splitting at Fayetteville and traveling northeast through Bellville and Hempstead to Houston. On August 21, 1923, it was cancelled. On July 28, 1924, it was restored, but as SH 73A, on meeting the conditions. On July 27, 1925, it was taken over. (SH 73A became SH 159 on March 19, 1930).

Historic SH 3D

State Highway 3-D was designated on August 21, 1922 as a spur that connected the main route and SH 3A between La Grange and Columbus. On August 21, 1923, the route was still under construction, but had been renumbered as SH 71.

Historic SH 3E

State Highway 3-E was another spur from Uvalde to La Pryor designated on July 16, 1923. On August 21, 1923, it was renumbered as SH 55.

== Major intersections ==
County	Location	mi	km	Destinations	Notes
Galveston	La Marque	0.0	0.0	SH 146	interchange
Galveston	La Marque	1.3	2.1	FM 519 (Main Street)	
Galveston	La Marque–Texas City line	3.1	5.0	FM 1765	
Galveston	Texas City	4.7	7.6	FM 1764 (Emmett F. Lowry Expressway) to I-45 – Texas City	interchange
Galveston	Texas City	8.6	13.8	FM 2004 south to I-45 – Hitchcock	
Galveston	Dickinson	10.7	17.2	FM 517 – Alvin, San Leon	
Galveston	League City	12.4	20.0	FM 646 to FM 1266	
Galveston	League City	13.4	21.6	SH 96 (League City Parkway)	
Galveston	League City	14.8	23.8	FM 518 – Friendswood, Kemah	
Harris	Webster	16.7	26.9	NASA 1 west (NASA Bypass) to I-45	interchange
Harris	Webster	17.4	28.0	NASA Parkway – NASA Lyndon B. Johnson Space Center, Alvin, Seabrook	former NASA 1
Harris	Houston	21.1	34.0	FM 2351 west (Clear Lake City Boulevard) – Friendswood	
Harris	Houston	23.0	37.0	FM 1959 west (Dixie Farm Road) to I-45 – Ellington Airport	
Harris	Houston	23.8	38.3	FM 2553 west (Scarsdale Boulevard) to I-45	
Harris	Houston	24.4	39.3	Beltway 8 (Frontage Road) to Sam Houston Tollway	interchange
Harris	Houston	30.4	48.9	I-45 (Gulf Freeway) – Galveston, Houston	I-45 exit 38
1.000 mi = 1.609 km; 1.000 km = 0.621 mi
