= Farm to Market Road 1765 =

Road in Texas, United States

Farm to Market Road 1765

Route information
- Maintained by TxDOT
- Length: 7.969 mi (12.825 km)
- Existed: 1951–present

Major junctions
- West end: FM 2004 in La Marque
- I-45 in La Marque; SH 3 in La Marque; SH 146 in Texas City
- East end: Spur 197 in Texas City

Location
- Country: United States
- State: Texas

Highway system
- Highways in Texas; Interstate; US; State; Former; Toll; Loops; Spurs; FM/RM; Park; Rec
← FM 1764	→ FM 1766

Farm to Market Road 1765 (FM 1765) is a 7.969-mile (12.825 km) farm to market road in the U.S. state of Texas. It begins at FM 2004 in La Marque and heads east to Spur 197 in Texas City. The portion of the route from SH 3 (formerly U.S. Highway 75) to Spur 197 was designated as SH 348 from June 10, 1943 until the two routes were combined on November 29, 1990.

== Route description ==
FM 1765 begins at an intersection with FM 2004 in La Marque, Galveston County east of the University of Houston Research Center, heading east on two-lane undivided Texas Avenue. The road heads through a mix of housing developments, fields, and woods. The highway heads into commercial areas, turning southeast before a turn to the northeast as a four-lane road. FM 1765 comes to an interchange with I-45 and becomes a seven-lane road with a center left-turn lane, curving east and becoming the border between Texas City to the north and La Marque to the south. The road heads through residential areas with some businesses, coming to an intersection with SH 3 and crossing a Union Pacific railroad line. The highway becomes five lanes with a center left-turn lane and passes through more developed areas, crossing another Union Pacific line and reaching a junction with SH 146. At this point, FM 1765 fully enters Texas City and passes near an oil refinery, turning northeast away from the oil refinery. The road becomes a four-lane undivided road and continues near residential neighborhoods. The highway turns east again and passes a mix of homes and businesses as a five-lane road with a center left-turn lane. The road passes more residential and commercial development to the north and the oil refinery to the south before passing several commercial establishments and crossing a Union Pacific railroad line. FM 1765 comes to its eastern terminus at an intersection with Spur 197.

== History ==
What is now FM 1765 east of SH 3 was designated as SH 348 on June 10, 1943, running from US 75 (now SH 3) east to SH 146 (later Loop 197, now Spur 197). FM 1765 was first designated on May 23, 1951 to run from SH 6 west of Hitchcock east to the former US 75 (now SH 3). On December 17, 1952, the route west of its present terminus was replaced by FM 2004. FM 1765 was extended east over the length of SH 348 on November 29, 1990.

On June 27, 1995 the internal designation of the route was changed to Urban Road 1765 (UR 1765). The designation reverted to FM 1765 with the elimination of the Urban Road system on November 15, 2018.

== Major intersections ==
The entire route is in Galveston County.

Location	mi	km	Destinations	Notes
La Marque	0.000	0.000	FM 2004	
La Marque			I-45 (Gulf Freeway)	I-45 exit 12
La Marque			SH 3	
Texas City			SH 146 (36th Street South)	
Texas City	7.969	12.825	Loop 197 (6th Street)	
1.000 mi = 1.609 km; 1.000 km = 0.621 mi
