= Michael Henry and Justin Robinett =

American duo

- Origin: Lake Jackson, Texas and Lubbock, Texas
- Genres: Pop, Country, Rock
- Years active: 2009–2014
- Label: Mud Hut Digital
- Members: Michael Henry; Justin Robinett
- Website: mhjrmusic.com

Michael Henry and Justin Robinett (sometimes stylized as Michael Henry & Justin Robinett) are an American duo from Lake Jackson, Texas and Lubbock, Texas.

== Career ==
The duo formed when Henry and Robinett met while attending Texas Tech together. Robinett attended Tech for only a year and Henry attended for four years, obtaining a Juris Doctor degree from Texas Tech University School of Law. After meeting, they began posting videos of themselves covering songs on Justin's YouTube channel, justinrobinett. The first song the duo covered was "Three Cheers for Five Years" by Mayday Parade. Shortly after, their videos began receiving thousands of views and the two began releasing more covers. The duo released their first album, titled Michael Henry & Justin Robinett in 2010 on iTunes. The album consists of primarily cover songs. The duo released their second album, titled Simplistic Duplexity, the following year. The duo released their third album, Harmonic Hyperbole in 2012 and their fourth album MHJR Piano in 2013.

The two have covered numerous well known songs, such as Billie Jean, Rolling in the Deep, Turning Tables, Someone Like You, Man in the Mirror, As Long as You Love Me, Just Give Me a Reason, What Makes You Beautiful, Free Fallin', Kiss Me Slowly (by Parachute), and medleys like Fireflies/Meteor Shower & Waiting for the End/E.T. among others.

On their YouTube channel, they currently have over 382,000 subscribers and over 79 million views on their videos.

== Discography ==
Studio albums

- Michael Henry & Justin Robinett (2010)
- Simplistic Duplexity (2011)
- Harmonic Hyperbole (2012)
- MHJR Piano (2013)
