= Farm to Market Road 1764 =

Highway in Texas

Farm to Market Road 1764

Route information
- Maintained by TxDOT
- Length: 13.265 mi (21.348 km)
- Existed: 1951–present

Major junctions
- West end: SH 6 in Santa Fe
- I-45 in Texas City; SH 3 in Texas City; SH 146 in Texas City
- East end: 14th St in Texas City

Location
- Country: United States
- State: Texas

Highway system
- Highways in Texas; Interstate; US; State; Former; Toll; Loops; Spurs; FM/RM; Park; Rec
← FM 1763	→ FM 1765

Farm to Market Road 1764 (FM 1764) is a 13-mile-long (21 km) state highway in the U.S. state of Texas. It is a farm to market road existing entirely within Galveston County that connects Santa Fe to Texas City via a short stretch of freeway known as the Emmett F. Lowry Expressway. The highway was designated in the 1950s.

== Route description ==
The western terminus of FM 1764 is at State Highway 6 (SH 6) in Santa Fe. From there, the route heads north slightly and then east, through farmland approximately 5.5 miles (8.9 km) towards junctions with FM 2004 and Interstate 45 (I-45) near Texas City.

At this point, FM 1764 transitions to a freeway segment which serves as a spur from I-45 into Texas City from points north—continuous travel between the western and eastern segments of FM 1764 requires use of frontage roads at the I-45 junction as there is no direct access. The freeway section, complete with frontage roads, is known as the Emmett F. Lowry Expressway and runs approximately five miles (8.0 km) between I-45 and SH 146 in Texas City. The expressway is named after Emmett F. Lowry, who served as mayor of Texas City from 1964 until his death in 1989 and was instrumental in the construction of the thoroughfare.

Once inside Texas City, FM 1764 becomes a city street. From SH 146, it follows Palmer Highway eastward, then curves slightly to the south to become 9th Avenue North. The eastern end of FM 1764 is at the intersection of 9th Avenue North and 14th Street, adjacent to Texas City High School.

== History ==
FM 1764 was first designated on May 23, 1951, and was defined to run from the then new routing of U.S. Route 75 (now I-45) east to SH 146. On December 17, 1952, the highway was expanded westward to its current terminus at SH 6 at Arcadia. On November 21, 1956, FM 1764 was extended east into Texas City to its current eastern terminus at 14th Street.

The freeway section of FM 1764 opened to traffic in 1988.

On June 27, 1995 the internal designation of the route was changed to Urban Road 1764 (UR 1764). The designation reverted to FM 1764 with the elimination of the Urban Road system on November 15, 2018.

== Junction list ==
The entire highway is in Galveston County. All exits are unnumbered.

Location	mi	km	Destinations	Notes
Santa Fe	0.0	0.0	SH 6 – Alvin, Galveston	Western terminus
Santa Fe	1.6	2.6	FM 646 – Dickinson, Santa Fe	
Texas City	5.4	8.7	I-45 / FM 2004 – Houston, Galveston, Hitchcock	Exits 15-16 on I-45; west end of freeway
Texas City			Century Boulevard	
Texas City			Amburn Road	
Texas City			SH 3 – La Marque, Dickinson	Access to Mainland Medical Center
Texas City			Willow Street, Frontage Road	
Texas City			Frontage Road	East end of freeway; westbound exit only; exit not signed
Texas City			SH 146 – Kemah, Galveston	
Texas City			14th Street	Eastern terminus
1.000 mi = 1.609 km; 1.000 km = 0.621 mi: Incomplete access
