= Brazoswood High School =

Public school in Texas, United States

Location
- 302 West Brazoswood Drive; Clute, Texas 77531; United States; 29.0264°N 95.4153°W

Information
- Other name: BWHS
- Type: Public
- Motto: "Preparing tomorrow's global leaders today"
- Established: September 1969
- Status: Open
- School district: Brazosport Independent School District
- NCES District ID: 4811190
- Educational authority: Texas Education Agency
- Superintendent: Danny Massey
- CEEB code: 442612
- NCES School ID: 481119000584
- Principal: Jarret Johnson
- Faculty: 182
- Teaching staff: 157.28 (on an FTE basis)
- Grades: 9–12
- Gender: Coeducational
- Enrollment: 2,436 (2024-2025)
  - Grade 9: 724
  - Grade 10: 633
  - Grade 11: 585
  - Grade 12: 494
- Student to teacher ratio: 15.49
- Campus size: 100 acres (40 ha)
- Campus type: Suburban
- Colors: Columbia blue and silver
- Athletics conference: UIL Class 6A
- Nickname: Buccaneers
- Rival: Angleton High School
- Newspaper: The Silver Sabre
- Yearbook: The Treasure Chest
- Website: bwhs.brazosportisd.net

Brazoswood High School is a public high school located in Clute, Texas, United States. It educates grades nine through twelve and is part of the Brazosport Independent School District. Its attendance boundary includes Clute, Lake Jackson, and Richwood.

The first class graduated 356 students in May 1971. The alma mater, written especially for this school, was not completed until just before graduation. When it was played at the ceremony in May 1971, the graduating seniors were hearing it for the first time and therefore could not sing their alma mater.

Approximately 2,500 students attend Brazoswood High School. More than eighty percent of them participate in one or more of the clubs, organizations, and sports.

For the 2024–2025 school year, Brazoswood High School was assigned a “B” rating by the Texas Education Agency. The school offers a variety of academic and extracurricular programs designed to support student achievement and involvement.

== Demographics ==
Historical student enrollment by year
| Race | 1989 | 2000 | 2005 | 2010 | 2013 | 2015 | 2017 | 2019 | 2020 |
|---|---|---|---|---|---|---|---|---|---|
| White | 77.51% | 69.59% | 64.00% | 57.52% | 50.89% | 47.64% | 44.78% | 42.08% | 41.33% |
| Black | 4.61% | 5.94% | 6.51% | 8.39% | 6.98% | 7.31% | 6.95% | 5.58% | 5.58% |
| Asian | 1.80% | 2.16% | 2.53% | 2.50% | 2.26% | 1.97% | 2.36% | 2.71% | 2.59% |
| Hispanic | 16.08% | 22.01% | 26.85% | 31.38% | 37.59% | 40.37% | 43.21% | 47.05% | 47.80% |
| Native American | 0.00% | 0.30% | 0.11% | 0.20% | 5.76% | 0.43% | 0.41% | 0.53% | 0.44% |
| Pacific Islander | 0.00% | 0.00% | 0.00% | 0.00% | 0.00% | 0.20% | 0.12% | 0.00% | 0.04% |
| Two or more races | 0.00% | 0.00% | 0.00% | 0.00% | 1.77% | 2.08% | 2.15% | 2.05% | 2.22% |
| Not specified | 0.00% | 0.00% | 0.00% | 0.00% | 0.00% | 0.00% | 0.00% | 0.00% | 0.00% |
| Total | 2059 | 2644 | 2611 | 2479 | 2426 | 2544 | 2416 | 2438 | 2475 |

== Extracurricular activities ==
Extracurricular activities include:

- AFJROTC: Unit TX-20054 is established at Brazoswood High School.
- Band
- Belles
- Choir
- Crimestoppers
- Debate
- FCCLA
- Habitat for Humanity
- Orchestra
- National Honor Society
- PALS
- Revelers
- Science Olympiad
- Spanish National Honor Society
- Student Council

== Athletics ==
Brazoswood has produced several championship teams and several individual honors.

=== State team championships ===
- Football
  - 1974 (Class 4A)
- Baseball
  - 1984 (Class 5A)
  - 1992 (Class 5A)
  - 2011 (Class 5A)
- Softball
  - 2000 (Class 5A)
- Girls' water polo
  - 2024 (Class 6A)
- Boys' water polo
  - 2022 (Class 6A)
- 2011 State skeet shooting champions
- 2013 TMEA 5A Honor Band

=== State individual championships ===
- Boys' swimming
  - Ronnie Paul, 100m butterfly, 1975
  - Ronnie Paul, 100m butterfly, 1976
  - Jason Fink, 100m freestyle, 1990
  - Jason Fink, 200m freestyle, 1990
- Girls' swimming
  - Kristi Kiggans, 100m butterfly, 1985
  - Kristi Kiggans, 100m butterfly, 1986
  - Kristi Kiggans, 100m butterfly, 1987
- Girls' cross country
  - Lauren Smith (Class 5A), 2007
- Girls' wrestling
  - Jenna Pisarski (all classes), 110 lbs, 2011
- Boys' track and field
  - Sam Whitmarsh (Class 6A), 800m, 2019

=== State individual qualifiers (finish) ===
- Girls' track and field
  - Brooklyn Baker (Class 6A), triple jump, 2023 (8th place)
- Boys' track and field
  - Connor McGuire (Class 5A), pole vault, 2012 (T-6th place)
  - Sam Whitmarsh (Class 6A), 800m, 2019 (1st place)
- Girls' cross country
  - Lauren Smith (Class 5A), 2007 (1st place)
- Boys' cross country
  - Xavier Jimenez (Class 5A), 2013 (13th place)
  - Giovani Diaz (Class 6A), 2023 (61st place)
- Girls' golf
  - Madison Kidd (Class 5A), 2013 (T-13th place)
  - Madison Kidd (Class 5A), 2014 (T-29th place)
  - Madison Kidd (Class 6A), 2015 (4th place)
- Boys' golf
  - Jacob Borow (Class 6A), 2018 (T-15th place)
  - Jacob Borow (Class 6A), 2019 (T-12th place)
- Girls' wrestling
  - Jessica Rodriguez (all classes), 95 lbs, 2011 (1-2 W-L)
  - Ann Hinds (all classes), 102 lbs, 2011 (0-2)
  - Jenna Pisarski (all classes), 110 lbs, 2011 (4-0, 1st place)
  - Jamie Baggett (all classes), 138 lbs, 2011 (1-2)
  - Arianna Bardsley (Class 6A), 95 lbs, 2022 (0-2)
  - Haley Basham (Class 6A), 145 lbs, 2023 (0-2)
  - Maria Gonzalez (Class 6A), 185 lbs, 2024 (0-2)
- Boys' wrestling
  - Michael Martin (all classes), 145 lbs, 2011 (3-2 W-L, 4th place)
  - Ryan Snow (all classes), 182 lbs, 2012 (2-2)
  - Jose Marce Acosta-Ruiz (Class 6A), 220 lbs, 2018 (0-2)
  - Derek Cole (Class 6A), 220 lbs, 2020 (1-2)
  - Jacob-Paul Shank (Class 6A), 220 lbs, 2022 (0-2)
  - Trevor Dyson (Class 6A), 285 lbs, 2022 (0-2)
  - Jake Basham (Class 6A), 150 lbs, 2023 (1-2)
  - Aaron Reyna (Class 6A), 113 lbs, 2024 (0-2)
  - Michael Villarreal (Class 6A), 215 lbs, 2024 (3-2)
- Girls' swimming
  - Kristi Kiggans (Class 5A), 100m butterfly, 1985 (1st place)
  - Kristi Kiggans (Class 5A), 100m butterfly, 1986 (1st place)
  - Kristi Kiggans (Class 5A), 100m butterfly, 1987 (1st place)
  - Molly Kuettel (Class 5A), 100m freestyle, 2014 (11th place)
  - Molly Kuettel (Class 6A), 50m freestyle, 2015 (10th place)
  - Molly Kuettel (Class 6A), 100m freestyle, 2015 (9th place)
  - Molly Kuettel (Class 6A), 100m freestyle, 2016 (14th place)
  - Molly Kuettel (Class 6A), 200m freestyle, 2016 (14th place)
- Boys' swimming
  - Ronnie Paul (Class 4A), 100m butterfly, 1975 (1st place)
  - Ronnie Paul (Class 4A), 100m butterfly, 1976 (1st place)
  - Jason Fink (Class 5A), 100m freestyle, 1990 (1st place)
  - Jason Fink (Class 5A), 200m freestyle, 1990 (1st place)
- 2000 Boys' swimming
- 2000 Girls' track
- 2001 Boys' golf
- 2001 Girls' track
- 2003 Powerlifting
- 2004 Boys' swimming
- 2006-11 Wrestling
- 2014 Girls' swimming
- 2014 Boys' water polo
- 2015 Boys' water polo
- 2017 Boys' water polo
- 2018 Boys' water polo
- 2018 Girls' water polo
- 2017 Robotics
- 2017 HOSA
- 2018 HOSA
- 2021 Boys' cross country
- 2022 Science Olympiad

== Feeder patterns ==
Ney Pre-Kindergarten feeds into Beutel, Brannen, and Roberts elementaries. Beutel, Brannen, and Roberts feed into Rasco Middle. Griffith, Ogg, and Polk elementaries feed into Clute Intermediate. Rasco Middle feeds into Lake Jackson Intermediate. Clute and Lake Jackson intermediates feed into Brazoswood.

== Notable alumni ==
- Mike Eldred (class of 1983) - Broadway and musical theater performer; contemporary Christian singer
- Robert Ellis - singer-songwriter
- Phil Huffman (class of 1977) - Major League Baseball second-round draft pick (San Francisco Giants); former Major League Baseball player (Toronto Blue Jays, Baltimore Orioles)
- Brad Lincoln (class of 2003) - Major League Baseball first-round draft pick (Pittsburgh Pirates); former Major League Baseball player (Pittsburgh Pirates, Toronto Blue Jays, Philadelphia Phillies); 2006 winner of Dick Howser Trophy and Brooks Wallace Award (University of Houston)
- Dennis Lindsey (class of 1987) - NBA executive (Detroit Pistons, Utah Jazz, San Antonio Spurs, Houston Rockets)
- Derrel Luce (class of 1971) - attorney; National Football League seventh-round draft pick (Baltimore Colts); former National Football League player (Baltimore Colts, Minnesota Vikings, Detroit Lions); first team All-Conference (Southwest Conference) and second team All-American, 1974 (Baylor University)
- Troy Neel (class of 1984) - Major League Baseball ninth-round draft pick (Cleveland Indians); former Major League Baseball (Oakland Athletics) and Nippon professional baseball player (Orix BlueWave, Doosan Bears)
- Rand Paul (class of 1981) - physician; member of United States Senate (2011–present)
- A.B. Quintanilla (class of 1983) - musician; producer; songwriter
- Sam Whitmarsh (class of 2021) - NCAA champion track and field runner
