= Rosharon, Texas =

Census-designated place in Bazoria County, Texas, United States

- Census-designated place (CDP)
- Nickname: "Buttermilk Station"
- Location within the state of Texas Rosharon (the United States)
- Coordinates: 29°21′08″N 95°27′37″W
- Country: United States
- State: Texas
- County: Brazoria (CDP); Fort Bend (areas near the CDP)

Area
  - Total: 3.2 sq mi (8.3 km^{2})
  - Land: 3.2 sq mi (8.3 km^{2})
  - Water: 0 sq mi (0.0 km^{2})

Population (2010)
  - Total: 1,152
  - Density: 358/sq mi (138.4/km^{2})
- Time zone: UTC-6 (Central (CST))
  - Summer (DST): UTC-5 (CDT)
- ZIP code: 77583
- Area code(s): 281 & 979
- FIPS code: 48-63332
- GNIS feature ID: 1366883

Rosharon (/roʊˈʃɛərən/ roh-SHAIR-ən), is a census-designated place (CDP) in Brazoria County, Texas, United States, at the intersection of Farm to Market Road 521 and Farm to Market Road 1462. As of the 2020 census, Rosharon had a population of 1,362. There are areas outside of the CDP, with Rosharon postal addresses, in Fort Bend County.

== History ==
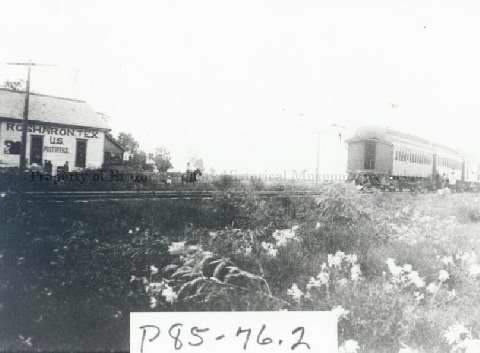
George Bingham's station and Columbia Tap train in Rosharon

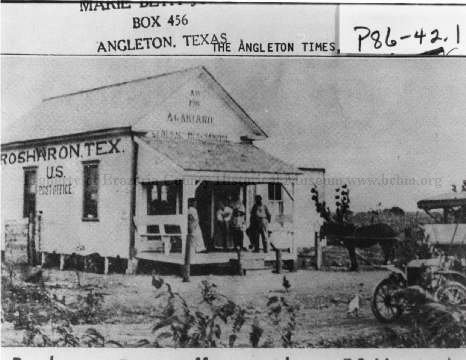
U S Post office in Rosharon in 1911

Plat of Rosharon from the BCHM, drawn by Tom Austin Lochridge

The Rosharon town site went unnamed during its early years. The area was settled by cotton and sugar plantations before the Civil War. Once the Houston Tap and Brazoria Railway (Columbia Tap) was completed in 1859, the Rosharon stop on the train line was given the name Masterson's Station, after a nearby plantation owned by Thomas G. Masterson (ca. 1813–1884). Rosharon was known locally by trainmen as "Buttermilk Station" because an early resident was known to bring a bucket of buttermilk and a dipper to the railroad station to give the engineer and crew a drink.

George Wetmore Colles, Jr. (1871–1951), an electrical and mechanical engineer educated at Yale University (BA 1892) and the Stevens Institute of Technology, bought property in the area around 1900 and called his estate the Rose of Sharon Garden Ranch after the many Cherokee Roses (Rosa laevigata) that grew there. Colles also designed the community water system.

Antonio G. Arcaro served as Rosharon's postmaster from 1912 to 1920. The Rosharon post office was discontinued in 1920 and mail was then sent to Sandy Point. The post office reopened in 1936, only to be closed again in 1979. A new post office was dedicated under President Ronald Reagan and operates today.

Tom Lochridge (1903–1985) platted the town site. Lochridge was responsible for having a cotton gin moved to Rosharon from Houston. Aside from providing employment for several persons, the gin's engine was used as Rosharon's first power plant. The community's first telephone exchange was operated out of Lochridge's home.

Rosharon's school was initially held in private home, and later in its own building. Eventually, the Rosharon school district was consolidated with the Angleton schools. Students began being bussed to Angleton in the late 1900s, a practice that continues to this day.

Church meetings were first held in a former school, then in a tavern that community members had bought and converted into a church. Eventually a brick church was constructed.

The South Texas Water Company located in Rosharon in 1935, and its fresh watercanals for irrigating rice brought some seventy-five to eighty rice farmers to the area.

By the late 1980s, Rosharon had an estimated population of 500. In 1990 the population was 435. Most residents commute to jobs in nearby towns.

== Geography ==
Neighborhoods in the surrounding area include; Songbird Ranch Airport (private), Savannah Plantation, Lindell Estates, Lakes of Savannah, Glendale Lakes, Southern Colony, Caldwell Ranch, Chenango Ranch, Coffee Lake, Seven Oaks Ranch, Sun Creek Estates, Sun Creek Ranch, Cold River Ranch, Sterling Lakes and Sierra Vista.

== Demographics ==
Historical population
Census	Pop.	Note	%±
2010	1,152		—
2020	1,362		18.2%
U.S. Decennial Census; 1850–1900 1910; 1920 1930 1940; 1950 1960 1970; 1980 1990 2000; 2010 2020

Rosharon first appeared as a census designated place in the 2010 U.S. census.

Rosharon CDP, Texas – Racial and ethnic composition Note: the US Census treats Hispanic/Latino as an ethnic category. This table excludes Latinos from the racial categories and assigns them to a separate category. Hispanics/Latinos may be of any race.
Race / Ethnicity (NH = Non-Hispanic)	Pop 2010	Pop 2020	% 2010	% 2020
White alone (NH)	377	353	32.73%	25.92%
Black or African American alone (NH)	211	189	18.32%	13.88%
Native American or Alaska Native alone (NH)	2	3	0.17%	0.22%
Asian alone (NH)	0	6	0.00%	0.44%
Pacific Islander alone (NH)	0	0	0.00%	0.00%
Other race alone (NH)	2	3	0.17%	0.22%
Mixed race or Multiracial (NH)	22	61	1.91%	4.48%
Hispanic or Latino (any race)	538	747	46.70%	54.85%
Total	1,152	1,362	100.00%	100.00%

=== Cambodians ===
In 1985 Yani Rose Keo, a Cambodian American, established a farm in an area called "Little Cambodia", in Brazoria County, near Rosharon. Terrence McCoy of the Houston Press stated that there were "perhaps" 90 families of Cambodian origin living there. In the 2000s (decade) the farmers got into a dispute with the Texas Parks and Wildlife Department (TPWD) over the farming of water spinach, which the TPWD classified as “Harmful or Potentially Harmful to Exotic Fish, Shellfish and Aquatic Plants.” Ultimately the TPWD allowed the farming of water spinach. "Little Cambodia" sustained damage during Hurricane Ike in 2008, and in Hurricane Harvey in 2017. As of 2015, 77583, the ZIP code of Rosharon, Texas, has the highest concentration of Cambodian Americans in the Greater Houston area.

== Economy ==
There are four Texas Department of Criminal Justice (TDCJ) prison units near Rosharon. Ramsey (formerly Ramsey I), Stringfellow (formerly Ramsey III), and Terrell (formerly Ramsey II) are all co-located. In addition Darrington Unit is near Rosharon. The Handbook of Texas stated that the prison authority employees and their family members "added considerably to [Rosharon's] economy."

A Schlumberger product center is located in Rosharon.

Rosharon is the current home of Skydive Spaceland Houston, a major skydiving center with a dedicated airstrip and landing area on the northeastern corner of FM 521 and FM 1462.

== Government and infrastructure ==
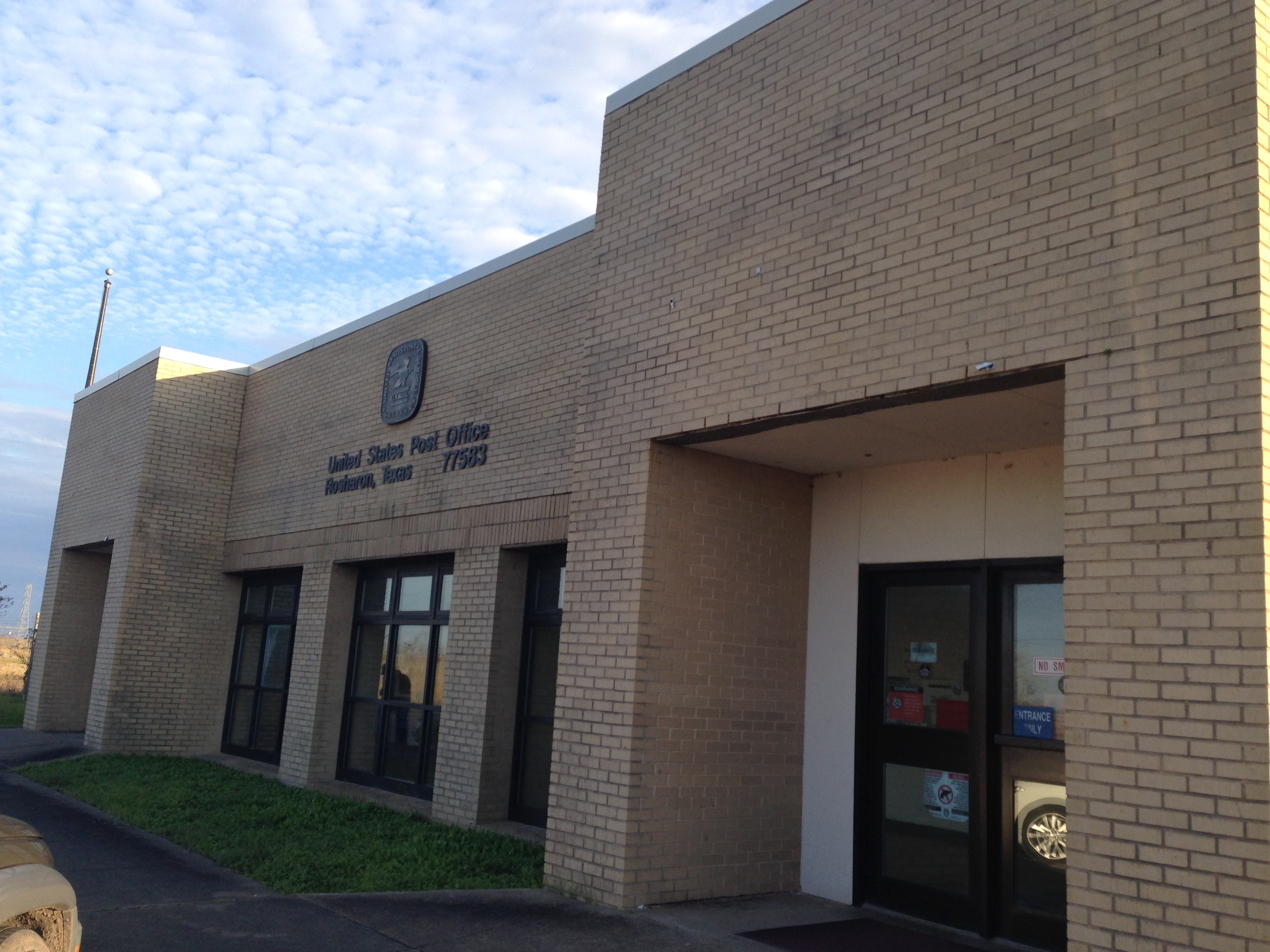
Rosharon Post Office

The Rosharon Volunteer Fire Department (RVFD) provides fire services for Rosharon. In the 1940s Rosharon community members, wanting to start a fire department, met with Brazoria County officials and purchased firefighting equipment. From the 1940s until 2004 the firefighting department received all of its support from fundraising events, private donations, and small contributions from the Brazoria County government. The volunteer group organized in 1956, and in 1986 the Rosharon Volunteer Fire Department, Inc. incorporated as a non-profit corporation. In 2002 taxpayers formed the Brazoria County Emergency Services District #3, which provides EMS services.

The United States Postal Service operates the Rosharon Post Office at 1810 East Farm to Market Road 1462.

== Education ==
=== Primary and secondary schools ===
Students in the Rosharon census-designated place attend the Angleton Independent School District (AISD) schools. In the 20th century the Rosharon school district was consolidated into the Angleton district, and busing into Angleton began in the late 20th century. Angleton High School serves all district residents.

Students in the surrounding area are zoned to AISD schools as well as the Fort Bend Independent School District for residents in Fort Bend County (Southern Colony). Almeta Crawford High School of FBISD has a Rosharon postal address, but is not in the CDP. Crawford High School began operations in 2023. Almeta Crawford is an African- American teacher who worked for the Fort Bend School district for 27 years.

Some Rosharon-area residents attend Manvel schools in the Alvin ISD. Manvel High School, Manvel Junior High, and E.C Mason Elementary.

In the neighborhoods west of Chocolate Bayou, along the north side of F.M. 1462, students attend Alvin Primary, Alvin Elementary, Fairview Junior High and Alvin High School in Alvin.

Prior to the opening of Hightower High School, Elkins High School served parts of the Rosharon area in Fort Bend County.

=== Colleges ===
The Texas Legislature designated portions of Angleton ISD that by September 1, 1995 had not been annexed by Alvin Community College as in the Brazosport College zone. As Rosharon is not in the maps of Alvin CC, it is in the Brazosport College zone. There was a section of H.B. No. 2744, filed on March 6, 2007, which would have changed the boundary between Alvin CC and Brazosport CC to put Rosharon in the Alvin CC service boundary.

== Notable people ==
- Matthew Arana (born 2010), soccer player

== See also ==
- List of census-designated places in Texas
