= Oyster Creek, Texas =

- City
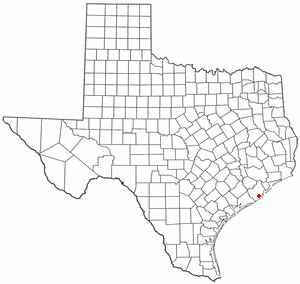
- Location of Oyster Creek, Texas

- Coordinates: 28°59′55″N 95°19′30″W
- Country: United States
- State: Texas
- County: Brazoria

Area
  - Total: 2.14 sq mi (5.53 km^{2})
  - Land: 1.90 sq mi (4.91 km^{2})
  - Water: 0.24 sq mi (0.62 km^{2})
- Elevation: 6.6 ft (2 m)

Population (2020)
  - Total: 1,173
  - Density: 619/sq mi (239/km^{2})
- Time zone: UTC-6 (Central (CST))
  - Summer (DST): UTC-5 (CDT)
- ZIP code: 77541
- Area code: 979
- FIPS code: 48-54528
- GNIS feature ID: 1364659
- Website: www.cityofoystercreek.org

Oyster Creek is a city in Brazoria County, Texas, United States. Its population was 1,173 at the 2020 census.

== Geography ==
Oyster Creek is located at 28°59′55″N 95°19′30″W (28.998521, –95.325062), partially bounded on the north by its eponymous stream.

According to the United States Census Bureau, the city has a total area of 2.0 square miles (5.2 km^{2}), of which 0.1 sq mi (0.26 km^{2}) (5.50%) is covered by water.

== Demographics ==
Historical population
| Census | Pop. | Note | %± |
|---|---|---|---|
| 1980 | 1,473 | | — |
| 1990 | 912 | | −38.1% |
| 2000 | 1,192 | | 30.7% |
| 2010 | 1,111 | | −6.8% |
| 2020 | 1,173 | | 5.6% |
U.S. Decennial Census; 2020 Census

=== Racial and ethnic composition ===
Racial composition as of the 2020 census
| Race | Number | Percent |
|---|---|---|
| White | 771 | 65.7% |
| Black or African American | 40 | 3.4% |
| American Indian and Alaska Native | 6 | 0.5% |
| Asian | 7 | 0.6% |
| Native Hawaiian and Other Pacific Islander | 1 | 0.1% |
| Some other race | 196 | 16.7% |
| Two or more races | 152 | 13.0% |
| Hispanic or Latino (of any race) | 386 | 32.9% |

=== 2020 census ===
As of the 2020 census, Oyster Creek had a population of 1,173. The median age was 40.0 years. 23.5% of residents were under the age of 18 and 14.9% of residents were 65 years of age or older. For every 100 females there were 109.1 males, and for every 100 females age 18 and over there were 117.7 males age 18 and over.

As of the 2020 census, 0.0% of residents lived in urban areas, while 100.0% lived in rural areas.

As of the 2020 census, there were 459 households in Oyster Creek, of which 32.9% had children under the age of 18 living in them. Of all households, 39.4% were married-couple households, 29.8% were households with a male householder and no spouse or partner present, and 20.7% were households with a female householder and no spouse or partner present. About 25.5% of all households were made up of individuals and 12.0% had someone living alone who was 65 years of age or older. As of the 2020 census, there were 635 housing units, of which 27.7% were vacant. The homeowner vacancy rate was 6.2% and the rental vacancy rate was 30.5%.

=== 2000 census ===
At the 2000 census, 1,192 people in 440 households, including 304 families, lived in the city. The population density was 629.1 inhabitants per square mile (242.9/km^{2}). The 527 housing units had an average density of 278.1 per square mile (107.4/km^{2}). The racial makeup of the city was 87.00% White, 3.61% African American, 1.59% Native American, 0.42% Asian, 5.29% from other races, and 2.10% from two or more races. Hispanics or Latinos of any race were 16.86%.

Of the 440 households, 32.7% had children under 18 living with them, 53.0% were married couples living together, 10.0% had a female householder with no husband present, and 30.9% were not families. About 23.4% of households were one person, and 10.2% were one person 65 or older. The average household size was 2.64 and the average family size was 3.14.

The age distribution was 30.2% under 18, 8.6% from 18 to 24, 28.5% from 25 to 44, 22.0% from 45 to 64, and 10.7% were 65 or older. The median age was 33 years. For every 100 females, there were 104.5 males. For every 100 females 18 and over, there were 102.4 males.

The median household income was $35,144 and the median family income was $38,676. Males had a median income of $35,000 versus $18,750 for females. The per capita income for the city was $15,000. About 14.2% of families and 19.2% of the population were below the poverty line, including 29.5% of those under 18 and 15.0% of those 65 or over.

== Education ==
The city is served by the Brazosport Independent School District.

- Freeport Elementary School (prekindergarten - grade 1)
- Velasco Elementary School (grades 2–4)
- Lanier Middle School (grades 5–6)
- Freeport Intermediate School (grades 7–8)
- Brazosport High School (grades 9–12)

Previously, Oyster Creek was entirely zoned to Velasco Elementary, which previously served grades Pre-K–4. In 2017, there was a realignment with Velasco Elementary becoming a grade 2–4 school for the area, while O. A. Eleming Elementary became a Pre-K–1 school. Fleming was scheduled to close when the new Freeport Elementary School opened in 2018.

The city is also served by Brazosport College. The Texas Legislature designated the Brazosport ISD as in the Brazosport College zone.

The city is served by the Brazoria County Library System.
