= Brazoria County Library System =

Help

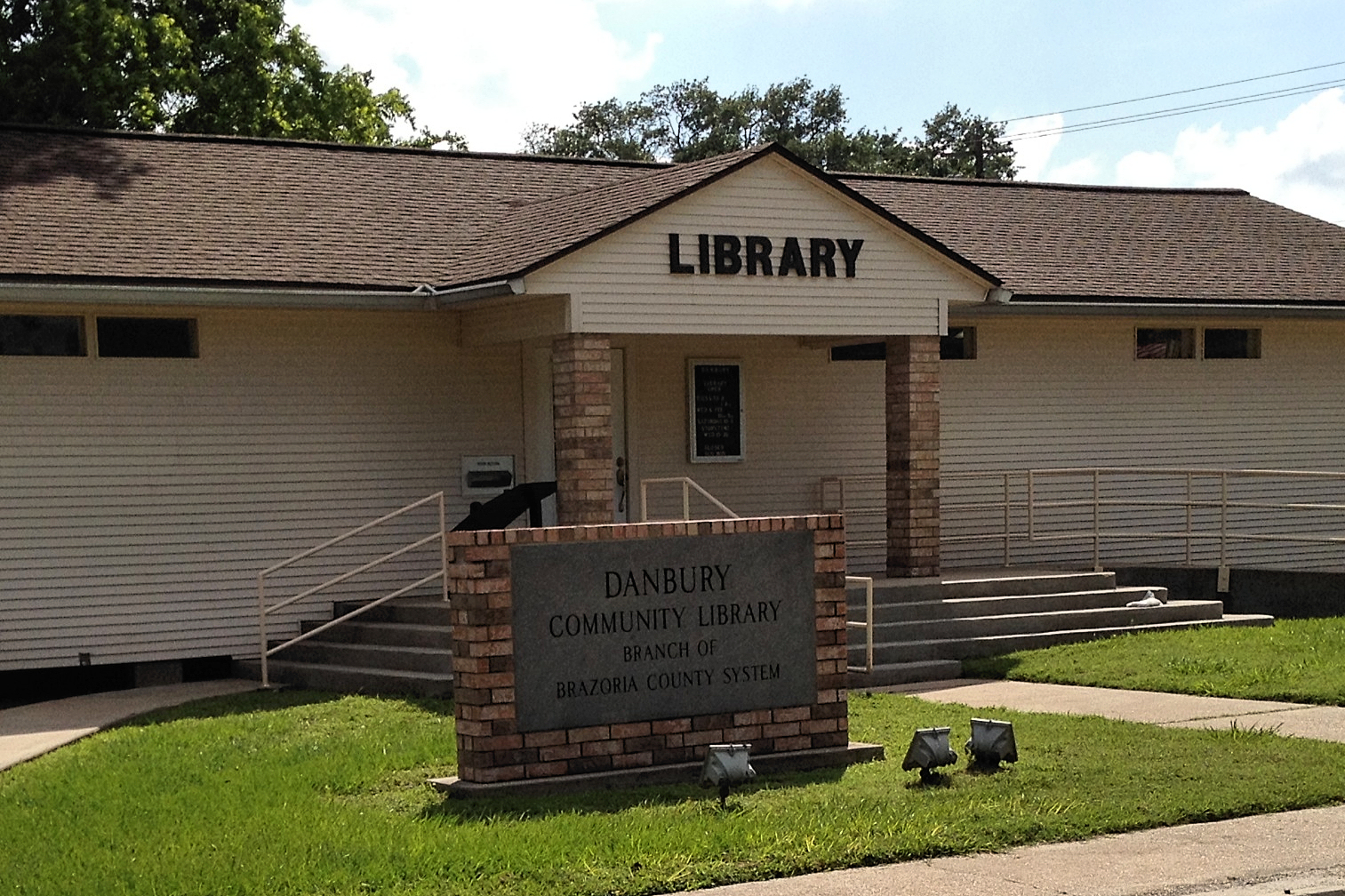
- Danbury Library

Library System overview
- Jurisdiction: Brazoria County, Texas, United States
- Website: Brazoria County Library System official site

The Brazoria County Library System operates public libraries in Brazoria County, Texas, United States.

The system has several libraries in many cities.

== Branches ==
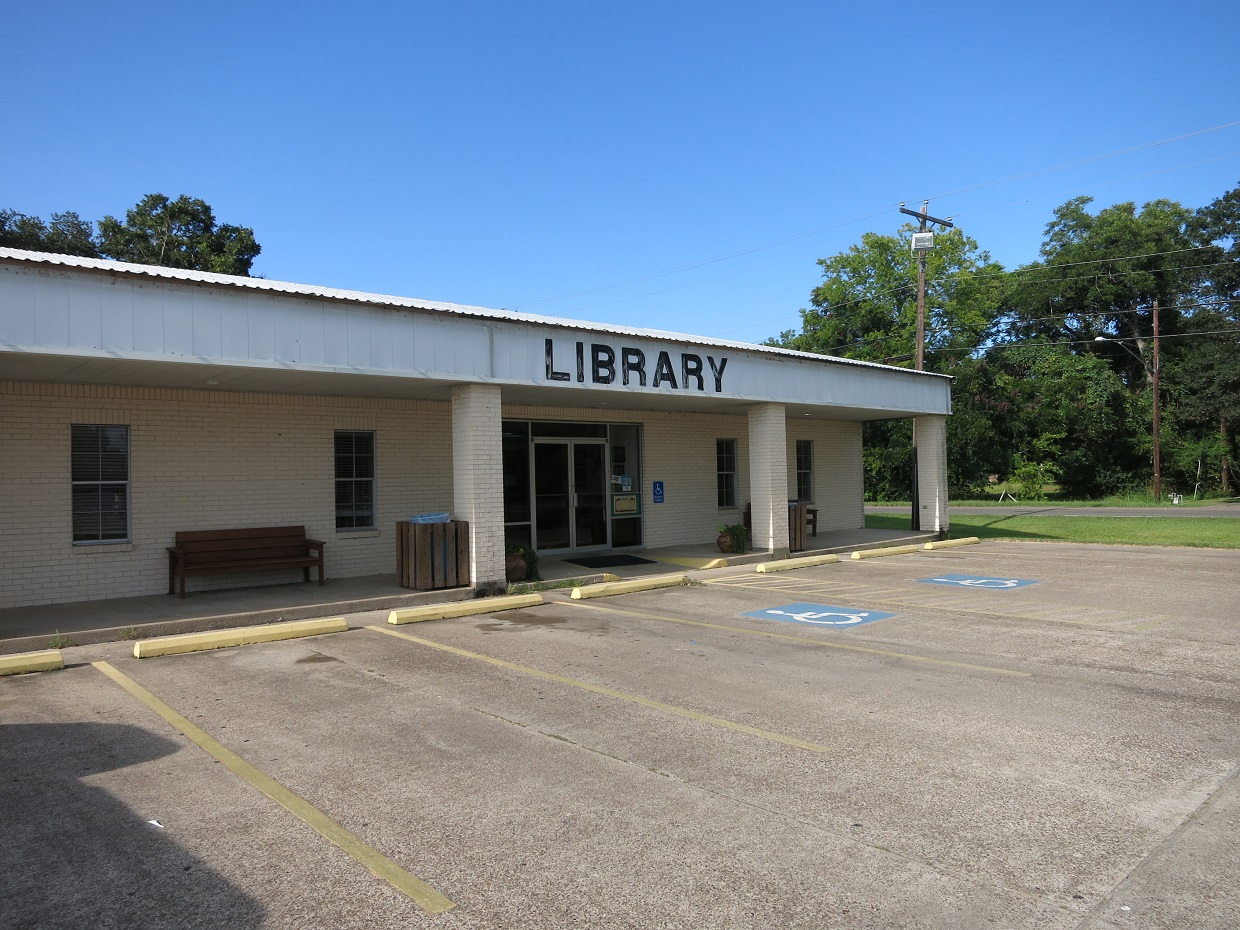
West Columbia Library

- Alvin Library - Alvin
- Angleton Library - Angleton
- Brazoria Library - Brazoria
- Clute Library - Clute
- Danbury Library - Danbury
- Freeport Library - Freeport
- Lake Jackson Library - Lake Jackson
- Manvel Library - Manvel
- Pearland Library - Pearland
- West Pearland Library - Pearland
- Sweeny Library - Sweeny
- West Columbia Library - West Columbia
