= Lake Jackson, Texas =

City in Brazoria County, Texas, United States

- City
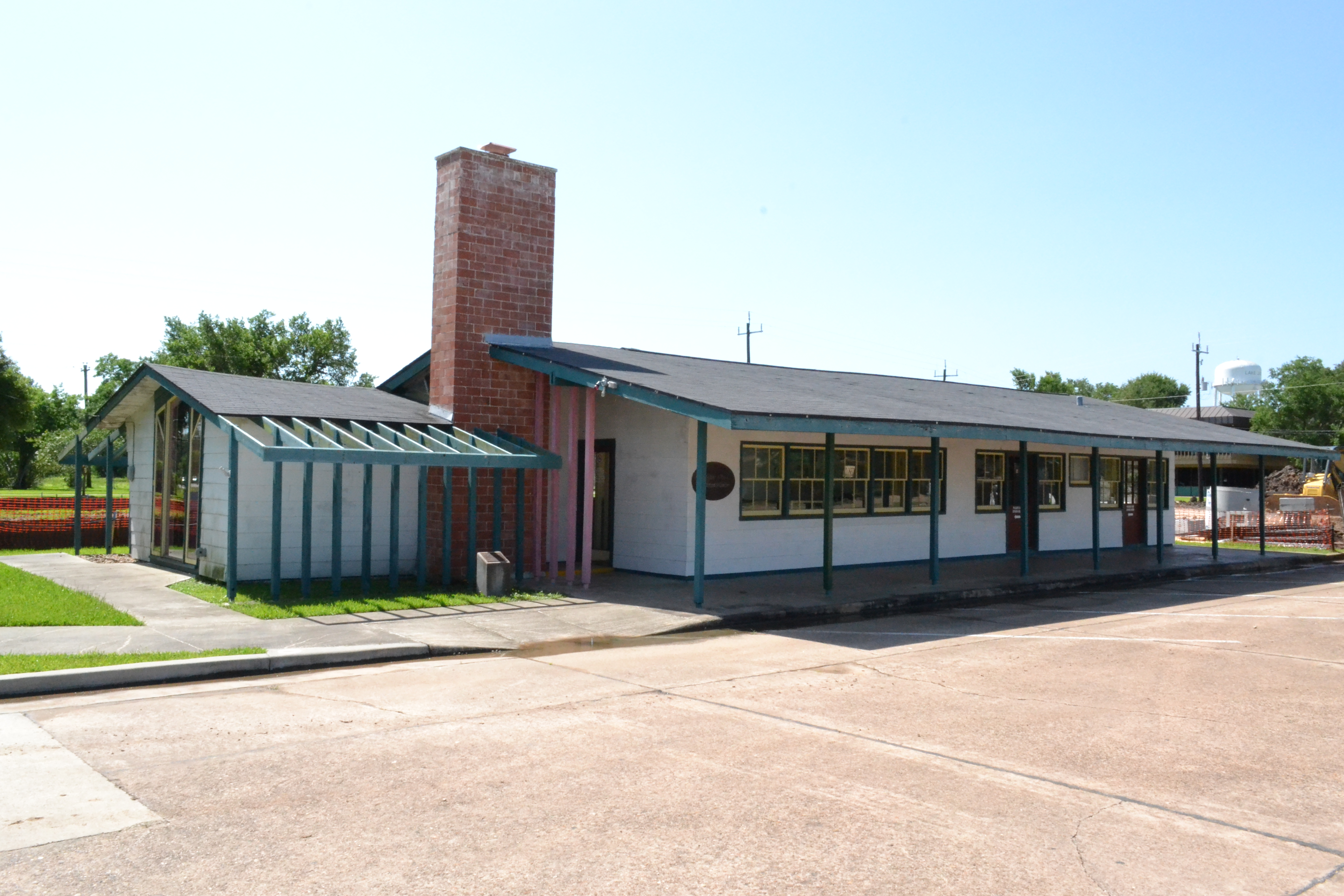
- Alden B. Dow Office and Lake Jackson City Hall

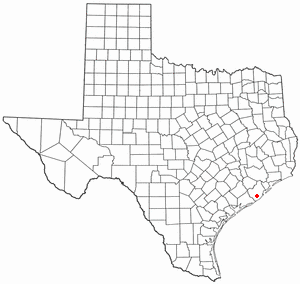
- Location in Brazoria County in the state of Texas

- Coordinates: 29°2′13″N 95°26′18″W
- Country: United States
- State: Texas
- County: Brazoria

Government
  - Type: Council-Manager
  - City Council: Mayor Gerald Roznovsky; Rhonda Seth; Matthew Broaddus; Ralph “Buster” L. Buell III; Vinay Singhania; Jon 'JB' Baker
  - City Manager: Modesto Mundo

Area
  - Total: 21.22 sq mi (54.95 km^{2})
  - Land: 19.74 sq mi (51.13 km^{2})
  - Water: 1.47 sq mi (3.82 km^{2})
- Elevation: 13 ft (4 m)

Population (2020)
  - Total: 28,177
  - Density: 1,379/sq mi (532.4/km^{2})
- Time zone: UTC–6 (CST)
  - Summer (DST): UTC–5 (CDT)
- ZIP code: 77566
- Area code: 979
- FIPS code: 48-40588
- GNIS feature ID: 1360850
- Website: www.lakejackson-tx.gov

Lake Jackson is a city in Brazoria County, Texas, United States, within the Greater Houston metropolitan area. As of the 2020 census, the city population was 28,177.

In 1942 a portion of Lake Jackson was first developed as a company town for workers of the Dow Chemical Company; it developed 5,000 acres on the former Abner Jackson Plantation. An oxbow lake was also named after the planter, whose house was located at the lake. Minor ruins of the Lake Jackson Plantation can now be seen in a park at the site.

== History ==
The city was built in the early 1940s as a planned community, designed by Alden B. Dow of Midland, Michigan for workers in support of a new plant of the Dow Chemical Company, which his father owned. The City of Lake Jackson was incorporated March 14, 1944, and voted for home rule ten years later in 1954.

== Geography ==
The city of Lake Jackson is located in south-central Brazoria County, and is bordered to the east by the cities of Clute and Richwood, and to the southwest by the Brazos River. Texas State Highway 288, the Nolan Ryan Expressway, runs through the city, leading 10 miles (16 km) north to Angleton, the county seat, 52 miles (84 km) north to downtown Houston, and 9 miles (14 km) southeast to Freeport on the Gulf of Mexico.

According to the United States Census Bureau, Lake Jackson has a total area of 20.9 square miles (54.2 km^{2}), of which 19.5 square miles (50.4 km^{2}) is land and 1.5 square miles (3.9 km^{2}), or 7.11%, is water.

== Demographics ==
Historical population
Census	Pop.	Note	%±
1950	2,897		—
1960	9,651		233.1%
1970	13,376		38.6%
1980	19,102		42.8%
1990	22,776		19.2%
2000	26,386		15.9%
2010	26,849		1.8%
2020	28,177		4.9%
U.S. Decennial Census

=== 2020 census ===
As of the 2020 census, there were 28,177 people residing in Lake Jackson; the median age was 37.0 years, 24.1% of residents were under the age of 18, and 15.4% of residents were 65 years of age or older. For every 100 females there were 97.7 males, and for every 100 females age 18 and over there were 96.6 males age 18 and over.

Of the 10,830 households, 33.2% had children under the age of 18 living in them, 51.6% were married-couple households, 18.0% were households with a male householder and no spouse or partner present, and 24.0% were households with a female householder and no spouse or partner present; about 25.6% of all households were made up of individuals and 10.6% had someone living alone who was 65 years of age or older.

There were 12,233 housing units, of which 11.5% were vacant. The homeowner vacancy rate was 1.6% and the rental vacancy rate was 20.2%.

98.6% of residents lived in urban areas, while 1.4% lived in rural areas.

Racial composition as of the 2020 census
Race	Number	Percent
White	18,788	66.7%
Black or African American	1,618	5.7%
American Indian and Alaska Native	221	0.8%
Asian	925	3.3%
Native Hawaiian and Other Pacific Islander	11	0.0%
Some other race	2,677	9.5%
Two or more races	3,937	14.0%
Hispanic or Latino (of any race)	8,024	28.5%

=== 2010 census ===
As of the census of 2010, there were 26,849 people, 10,319 households, and 7,134 families residing in the city. The population density was 1,386.0 inhabitants per square mile (535.1/km^{2}). There were 11,149 housing units at an average density of 550.2 per square mile (212.4/km^{2}). The racial makeup of the city was 84.36% White, 5.10% African American, 0.52% Native American, 3.14% Asian, 0.04% Pacific Islander, 4.44% from other races, and 2.40% from two or more races. Hispanic or Latino of any race were 20.53% of the population.

There were 9,588 households, out of which 42.6% had children under the age of 18 living with them, 64.7% were married couples living together, 8.5% had a female householder with no husband present, and 23.4% were non-families. Twenty percent of all households were made up of individuals, and 7.3% had someone living alone who was 65 years of age or older. The average household size was 2.74 and the average family size was 3.18.

In the city, the population was spread out, with 26.41% under the age of 18, 5.61% from 20 to 24, 12.51% from 25 to 34, 20.60% from 35 to 49, 20.10% from 50 to 64, and 12% who were 65 years of age or older. The median age was 35 years. For every 100 females, there were 96.06 males. For every 100 females age 18 and over, there were 94.3 males.

The median income for a household in the city was $60,901, and the median income for a family was $69,053. Males had a median income of $60,143 versus $30,398 for females. The per capita income for the city was $25,877. About 5.4% of families and 6.4% of the population were below the poverty line, including 6.5% of those under age 18 and 6.7% of those age 65 or over.

== Economy ==
Gas station and convenience store chain Buc-ee's has its headquarters in Lake Jackson where the first location opened.

The Dow Chemical Company and the Brazosport Independent School District are major employers of residents. Dow planned to develop this community in 1941 as a 5,000-acre residential area for workers at its Freeport plant. Lake Jackson is now home to other chemical and manufacturing facilities, along with many other types of businesses. In Lake Jackson's early days, Dow helped to create a booming economy. In 2014 it announced an expansion project that is estimated to bring nearly 2,000 employees to the area.

The unemployment rate in Lake Jackson, TX, is 8.40%, with job growth of 2.40%. Future job growth over the next ten years is predicted to be 36.40%. The income per capita is $30,625, which includes all adults and children. The median household income is $68,391. The sales tax rate in Lake Jackson, TX, is 8.25%.

Sales tax income represents a population of over 70,000 indicating the draw of the retail shopping from the area.

== Arts and culture ==
The Lake Jackson Library is a part of the Brazoria County Library System.

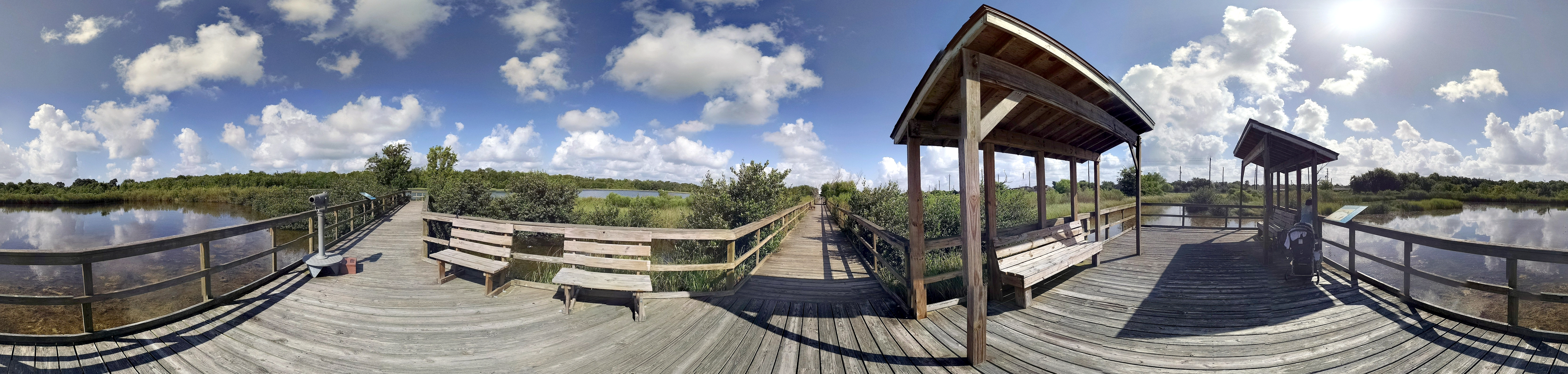
Wetlands boardwalk at Sea Center Texas in Lake Jackson. Built in 1996, the center features an aquarium, education center, and the world's largest redfish hatchery.

== Government ==
Lake Jackson is within Texas's 14th congressional district and is represented by Randy Weber.

The City of Lake Jackson owns an animal shelter facility that it contracts to the SPCA of Brazoria County. Lake Jackson began establishing a separate building that is to be a municipally-controlled animal shelter. In 2026, construction was in progress for the municipal animal shelter. The SPCA signed a 20 year lease in 2022 so it could stay in the original municipal facility.

== Education ==
=== Public schools ===
The public schools in the city are operated by Brazosport Independent School District. Some parts of the city limits fall in the Angleton Independent School District and the Columbia-Brazoria Independent School District.

K–5 elementary schools within Lake Jackson include:

- O.M. Roberts Elementary
- A.P. Beutel Elementary (2007 National Blue Ribbon School)
- Bess Brannen Elementary
- T.W. Ogg Elementary

Residents are zoned to:

- Grady B. Rasco Middle School (5–6)
- Lake Jackson Intermediate School (7–8)
- Brazoswood High School (9–12, in Clute)

=== Private schools ===
Private schools within Lake Jackson include:

- Brazosport Christian School
- Our Lady Queen of Peace (of the Roman Catholic Archdiocese of Galveston-Houston)
- Foundation Preparatory Academy

=== Colleges ===
Brazosport College is a public community college located in Lake Jackson, with the majority of the Lake Jackson city limits in the college's district. The Texas Legislature designated Brazosport ISD, Columbia-Brazoria ISD, and portions of Angleton ISD that by September 1, 1995, had not been annexed by Alvin Community College as in the Brazosport College zone.

In 2005, the college's first baccalaureate degree program began: Applied Technology in Technology Management. It is also known for its professional music hall, The Clarion.

== Infrastructure ==
In September 2020, brain-eating amoeba were detected in the Lake Jackson drinking water supply, resulting in the death of a 6-year-old boy. Eleven samples were taken around the city, and of those, three returned a preliminary positive results: the hose bib at the victim's home, a hydrant at a dead end street, and a storage tank at the city splash pad. This resulted in Brazosport Water Authority issuing a do-not-use order on tap water in late September 2020.

=== Airports ===
Texas Gulf Coast Regional Airport serves Lake Jackson.

=== Mass transit ===
Southern Brazoria County Transit provides bus service options for Lake Jackson, Clute, Freeport and Angleton.

=== Highways ===
State Highway 288. Northbound SH 288 to Houston. Southbound, SH 288 routes to Freeport.

Texas State Highway 332 extends from its west end SH 36 in Brazoria to its east end at Surfside Beach.

=== Streets ===
- The city's layout and the six designs for homes were completed by Michigan architect Alden B. Dow.
- All streets radiating from downtown end in the word "Way." Among the streets are Center Way, Winding Way, Circle Way, and Parking Way. There is an intersection of two streets named This Way and That Way. In the same spirit, a local church near Bess Brannen Elementary placed a small sign in their driveway named His Way. There is also an Any Way.
- Most other streets were named after some form of flora. As the city grew and common names such as Pine, Mulberry, and Oak were taken, developers had to become more creative; thus, among the plants used are Jalapeño, Tangerine, Mango, and Habanero. The highways running through Lake Jackson, (Texas Highways 288 & 332) and Oyster Creek Drive, are exceptions to the naming conventions. The naming convention of "Drive," meaning a route into or out of town, is less honored today than in the beginning.
- Dow intentionally laid out the streets so that they seldom follow straight paths. He wanted to maintain as many trees as possible, a principle still practiced in the development of new subdivisions. In addition, he thought that curving streets provided more surprises in unfolding vistas. Lake Jackson is a part of the National Arbor Day Foundation's Tree City USA list. Also, many of the streets follow Oyster Creek, which twists and winds through town. In many areas of town one can travel in any of the four compass directions and have the same commute time and distance to a destination across town.

== Notable people ==
- Robert Ellis, Country, bluegrass and folk singer born, and spent most of his childhood, in Lake Jackson
- King Hill, All-American quarterback at Rice University, first-round pick in the 1958 NFL draft, and long-time pro quarterback grew up in Lake Jackson
- Brad Lincoln, a former professional baseball player for the Pittsburgh Pirates and Toronto Blue Jays
- Troy Neel, former professional baseball player for the Oakland A's
- Rand Paul, U.S. senator from Kentucky since 2012; spent most of his childhood in Lake Jackson
- Ron Paul, U.S. representative from Texas's 14th congressional district as well as a Republican presidential candidate in 2008 and 2012. He also ran as the Libertarian Party candidate in 1988
- Selena Quintanilla Pérez (1971–1995), Tejano pop singer, known as the Queen of Tejano Music
- Ryan Tepera, a relief pitcher for the Toronto Blue Jays of Major League Baseball
- Cole Deggs & The Lonesome (Cole Degges- Vocalist), Multi-platinum songwriter for Kenny Chesney, Gary Allan, Tracy Byrd, Andy Griggs Billy Dean, Chris Janson, Dave Dudley & Josh Ward, he grew up on Pine Street
- Michael Henry and Justin Robinett, musicians

== See also ==
- List of municipalities in Texas
