= Clute, Texas =

City in Brazoria County, Texas, United States

City of Clute
- City
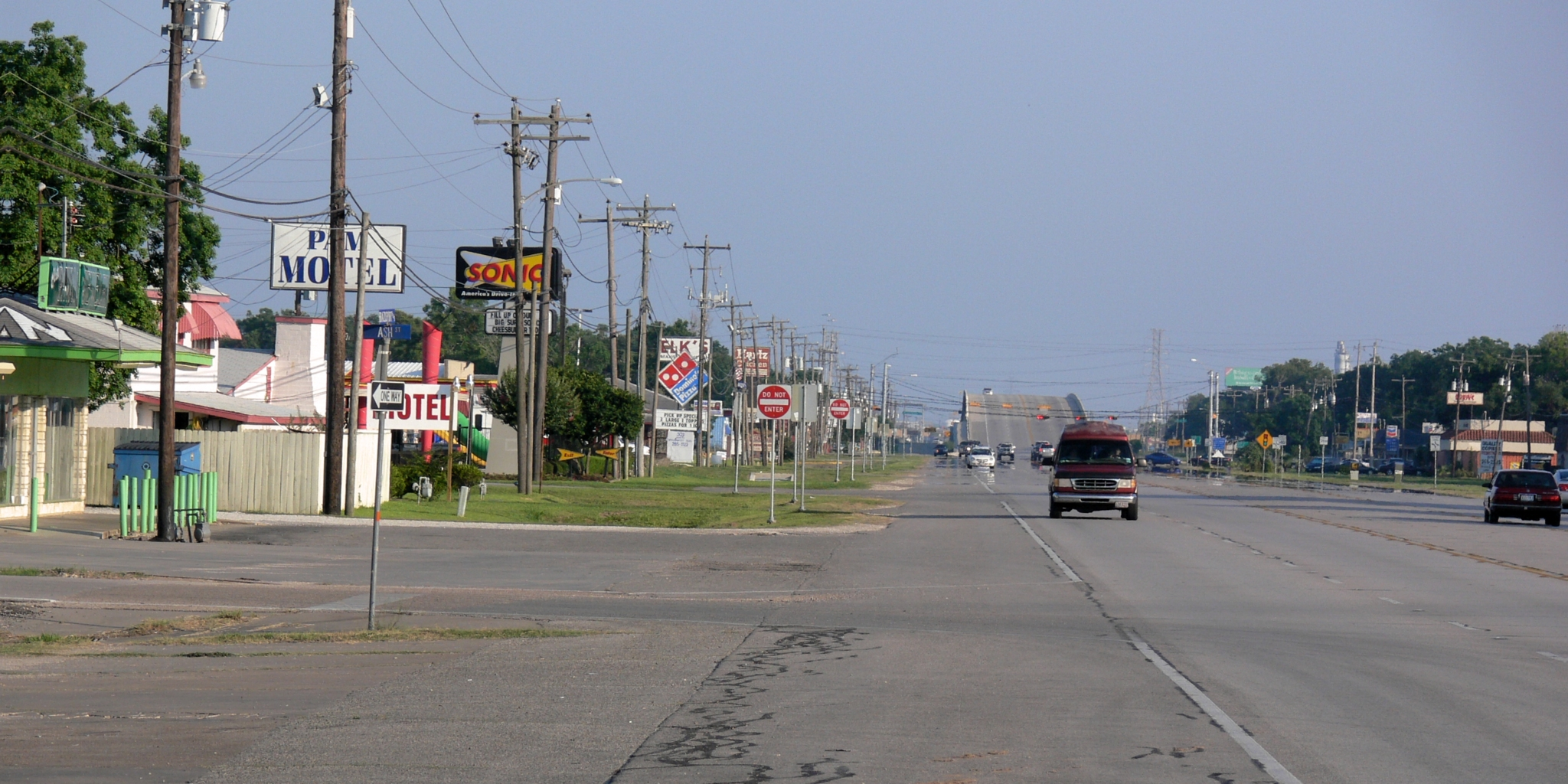
- SH 288 Business in Clute

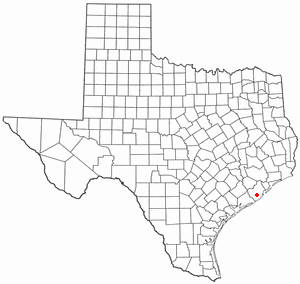
- Location in the state of Texas

- Coordinates: 29°01′30″N 95°22′50″W
- Country: United States
- State: Texas
- County: Brazoria
- Incorporated: May 1952
- Founded by: Soloman J. Clute

Government
  - Type: Council-Manager

Area
  - Total: 5.69 sq mi (14.73 km^{2})
  - Land: 5.32 sq mi (13.78 km^{2})
  - Water: 0.37 sq mi (0.95 km^{2})
- Elevation: 10 ft (3.0 m)

Population (2020)
  - Total: 10,604
  - Density: 2,197.8/sq mi (848.58/km^{2})
- Time zone: UTC-6 (CST)
  - Summer (DST): UTC-5 (CDT)
- ZIP code: 77531
- Area code: 979
- FIPS code: 48-15652
- GNIS feature ID: 2409490
- Website: https://clutetexas.gov/

Clute is a city in Brazoria County, Texas, United States, within the Houston metropolitan area. As of the 2020 census, the city population was 10,604. The city gained some fame with the discovery of a fossilized mammoth named Asiel.

== History ==
Clute's history began at the junction of the old Calvit and Eagle Island Plantations. Alexander Calvit, one of Stephen F. Austin's Old Three Hundred, obtained title to the land in 1824. Eagle Island Plantation belonged to Jared Groce, the richest man in Austin's Colony. Calvit's plantation later became the Herndon sugar plantation, owned by John H. Herndon, who married Calvit's only daughter.

After the American Civil War, Joseph Pegan, Soloman (or Solomon) J. Clute, and several relatives including George and John Clute, founded a community near the plantation site. In 1881, the name Clute was adopted when both plantations were bought by Solomon J. Clute. George was described as, "a little Yankee from New York with a long, white beard." The other founders of Clute have also been described as northerners. The Clutes acquired additional land from Herndon, who put it up for auction in the 1870s. A deed dated March 17, 1886, transferred ownership from Soloman J. Clute to George Clute for property known as Clute's Place. Soloman Clute administered the community until 1888 or 1889, when it was sold. The Eagle Island Plantation of William H. Wharton occupied the site of present Restwood Memorial Park.

In 1933, Clute had only two businesses and a population of ten. By 1937 the town had a school for white children with two teachers and two schools for black children with one teacher each. In the early 1940s, Clute began to prosper with the advent of Dow Chemical and several large construction companies moving into Southern Brazoria County. A post office was established by 1943, and a new grade school was built in the 1950s.

In 1950, Clute had a population of 700 and thirty-six businesses; in 1954 the residents numbered 3,200 and the businesses forty-five. Clute was incorporated in May 1952 under the name Clute City, with a commission form of government; in 1955 the town changed its name back to Clute and adopted an alderman (city council) form of government.

Brazoswood High School opened in Clute in 1969 with grades 9–11. The first class graduated 356 students in May 1971. Brazoswood won the state championship in football in 1974.

== Mammoth discovery ==
In November 2003, a pair of mammoth tusks were found buried in a sand pit near Brazoswood High School by a backhoe operator. They are believed to be remains of the first-dated mammoth discovered on the Texas Gulf Coast.

The mammoth was judged to be about 38,000 years old, judging from the age of logs recovered near the site, and was considered to be a Columbian mammoth. These mammoths were slightly larger and less hairy than their famous cousin, the woolly mammoth. In addition, fossil logs and remains of bison, horse, deer and turtle are present, providing a glimpse of a unique Ice Age environment buried 35 feet below the surface, said Robson Bonnichsen, director of the Center for the Study of the First Americans.

There is now a restaurant/museum of the same name to honor the discovery.

== Geography ==
According to the United States Census Bureau, the city has a total area of 5.6 square miles (15 km^{2}), of which 5.3 square miles (14 km^{2}) is land and 0.3 square miles (0.78 km^{2}) (5.14%) is water.

== Demographics ==
Historical population
Census	Pop.	Note	%±
1960	4,501		—
1970	6,023		33.8%
1980	9,577		59.0%
1990	8,910		−7.0%
2000	10,424		17.0%
2010	11,211		7.5%
2020	10,604		−5.4%
U.S. Decennial Census

=== 2020 census ===
As of the 2020 census, there were 10,604 people, 3,845 households, and 2,854 families residing in the city. The median age was 31.9 years, 27.8% of residents were under the age of 18 and 11.5% of residents were 65 years of age or older. For every 100 females there were 96.9 males, and for every 100 females age 18 and over there were 95.5 males age 18 and over.

99.9% of residents lived in urban areas, while 0.1% lived in rural areas.

There were 3,845 households in Clute, of which 38.7% had children under the age of 18 living in them. Of all households, 40.6% were married-couple households, 23.2% were households with a male householder and no spouse or partner present, and 28.7% were households with a female householder and no spouse or partner present. About 25.3% of all households were made up of individuals and 6.9% had someone living alone who was 65 years of age or older.

There were 4,989 housing units, of which 22.9% were vacant. Among occupied housing units, 50.5% were owner-occupied and 49.5% were renter-occupied. The homeowner vacancy rate was 2.3% and the rental vacancy rate was 32.3%.

Racial composition as of the 2020 census
Race	Number	Percent
White	4,921	46.4%
Black or African American	1,088	10.3%
American Indian and Alaska Native	109	1.0%
Asian	97	0.9%
Native Hawaiian and Other Pacific Islander	8	0.1%
Some other race	2,173	20.5%
Two or more races	2,208	20.8%
Hispanic or Latino (of any race)	5,692	53.7%

=== 2000 census ===
As of the census of 2000, there were 10,424 people, 3,674 households, and 2,564 families residing in the city. The population density was 1,949.1 inhabitants per square mile (752.6/km^{2}). There were 4,142 housing units at an average density of 774.5 per square mile (299.0/km^{2}). The racial makeup of the city was 64.22% White, 7.66% African American, 0.76% Native American, 0.96% Asian, 0.01% Pacific Islander, 23.03% from other races, and 3.37% from two or more races. Hispanic or Latino of any race were 48.09% of the population.

There were 3,674 households, out of which 41.0% had children under the age of 18 living with them, 49.3% were married couples living together, 14.5% had a female householder with no husband present, and 30.2% were non-families. 24.0% of all households were made up of individuals, and 4.7% had someone living alone who was 65 years of age or older. The average household size was 2.79 and the average family size was 3.35.

In the city, the population was spread out, with 31.4% under the age of 18, 13.5% from 18 to 24, 31.1% from 25 to 44, 16.4% from 45 to 64, and 7.6% who were 65 years of age or older. The median age was 28 years. For every 100 females, there were 101.7 males. For every 100 females age 18 and over, there were 99.7 males.

The median income for a household in the city was $32,622, and the median income for a family was $34,638. Males had a median income of $31,574 versus $18,396 for females. The per capita income for the city was $14,008. About 16.0% of families and 18.2% of the population were below the poverty line, including 22.0% of those under age 18 and 14.5% of those age 65 or over.

== Education ==
The public schools in the city are operated by the Brazosport Independent School District. Schools in Clute include:

- Madge Griffith Elementary School
- T. W. Ogg Elementary School
- Clute Intermediate School
- Brazoswood High School

The city is also served by Brazosport College. The Texas Legislature designated the Brazosport ISD as in the Brazosport College zone.

The Clute Library is a part of the Brazoria County Library System.

== Culture ==
Clute hosts "The Great Texas Mosquito Festival" every July. The festival has been held annually since 1981. The three-day festival attracts some 18,000 visitors.

== Notable person ==
- Ron Paul, Clute is where former Rep. Ron Paul currently resides, and is also where his son, Sen. Rand Paul went to high school

== See also ==
- List of municipalities in Texas
