= Angleton, Texas =

City in and county seat of Brazoria County, Texas, United States

- City
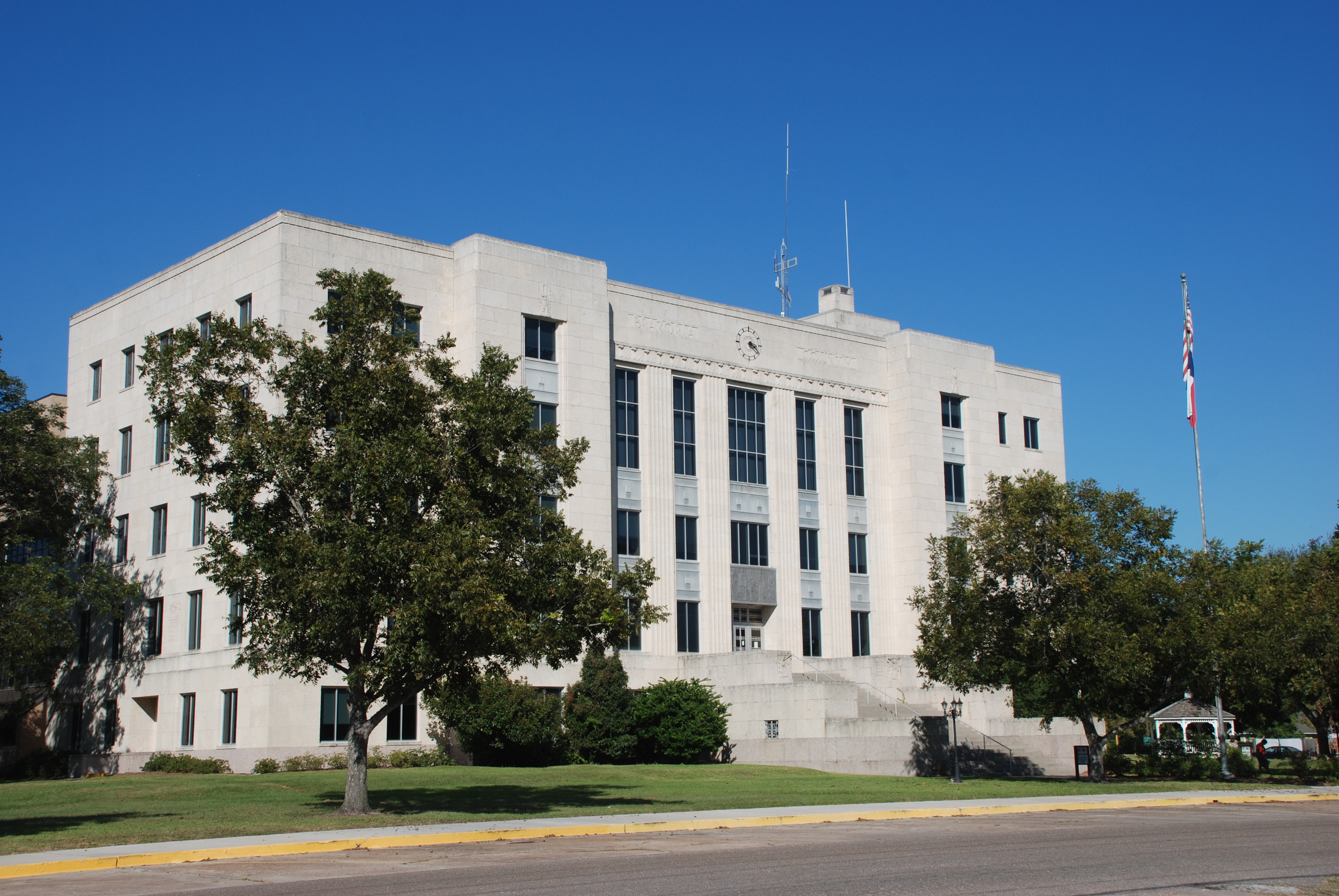
- Brazoria County Courthouse in Angleton
- Nickname: "The Heart of Brazoria County"
- Interactive map of Angleton, Texas
- Location in Texas Location in the United States
- Coordinates: 29°09′59″N 95°25′51″W
- Country: United States
- State: Texas
- County: Brazoria
- Incorporated: November 12, 1912

Government
  - Type: Council-Manager
  - City council: Mayor; John Wright; Mayor Pro Tem; Travis Townsend; Council Members; Blaine Smith; Christiene Daniel; Barbra Simmons; Tanner Sartin
  - City manager: Chris Whittaker

Area
  - Total: 11.69 sq mi (30.28 km^{2})
  - Land: 11.67 sq mi (30.23 km^{2})
  - Water: 0.019 sq mi (0.05 km^{2})
- Elevation: 30 ft (9.1 m)

Population (2020)
  - Total: 19,429
  - Density: 1,665.0/sq mi (642.85/km^{2})
- Time zone: UTC-6 (CST)
  - Summer (DST): UTC-5 (CDT)
- ZIP codes: 77515-77516
- Area code: 979
- FIPS code: 48-03264
- GNIS feature ID: 2409710
- Website: www.angleton.tx.us

Angleton is a city in and the county seat of Brazoria County, Texas, United States, within the Houston–Pasadena–The Woodlands metropolitan area. Angleton lies at the intersection of State Highway 288, State Highway 35, and the Union Pacific Railroad. The population was 19,429 at the 2020 census. Angleton is in the 14th congressional district, and is represented by Republican Congressman Randy Weber.

== History ==
Angleton was founded in 1890 near the center of Brazoria County and named for the wife of the general manager of the Velasco Terminal Railway. A bitter rivalry emerged between the town and nearby Brazoria for the location of the county seat; Angleton was chosen as the seat in 1896 and rechosen by county-wide election in 1913. The town was incorporated on November 12, 1912.

== Geography ==
Angleton is located near the center of Brazoria County. The town is located about seven miles north of Lake Jackson and is about 20 miles away from the Gulf of Mexico coastline.

According to the United States Census Bureau, Angleton has a total area of 11.3 square miles (29.2 km^{2}), of which 0.019 sq mi (0.05 km^{2}), or 0.17%, is covered by water.

=== Climate ===
The climate in this area is characterized by hot, humid summers and generally cold to cool winters. According to the Köppen climate classification system, Angleton has a humid subtropical climate, Cfa on climate maps.

== Demographics ==
Historical population
Census	Pop.	Note	%±
1920	1,043		—
1930	1,229		17.8%
1940	1,763		43.4%
1950	3,399		92.8%
1960	7,312		115.1%
1970	9,770		33.6%
1980	13,929		42.6%
1990	17,140		23.1%
2000	18,130		5.8%
2010	18,862		4.0%
2020	19,429		3.0%
U.S. Decennial Census

=== 2020 census ===
As of the 2020 census, Angleton had a population of 19,429, 7,143 households, and 5,178 families residing in the city. The median age was 36.4 years; 26.1% of residents were under the age of 18 and 15.2% of residents were 65 years of age or older. For every 100 females there were 95.0 males, and for every 100 females age 18 and over there were 91.9 males age 18 and over.

98.9% of residents lived in urban areas, while 1.1% lived in rural areas.

There were 7,143 households in Angleton, of which 36.5% had children under the age of 18 living in them. Of all households, 47.5% were married-couple households, 18.6% were households with a male householder and no spouse or partner present, and 27.3% were households with a female householder and no spouse or partner present. About 24.7% of all households were made up of individuals and 10.2% had someone living alone who was 65 years of age or older.

There were 7,892 housing units, of which 9.5% were vacant. Among occupied housing units, 65.6% were owner-occupied and 34.4% were renter-occupied. The homeowner vacancy rate was 1.7% and the rental vacancy rate was 14.3%.

Racial composition as of the 2020 census
Race	Percent
White	57.6%
Black or African American	12.2%
American Indian and Alaska Native	0.9%
Asian	1.1%
Native Hawaiian and Other Pacific Islander	<0.1%
Some other race	12.7%
Two or more races	15.4%
Hispanic or Latino (of any race)	36.0%

=== 2000 census ===
As of the census of 2000, 18,130 people, 6,508 households, and 4,894 families resided in the city. The population density was 1,716.3 inhabitants per square mile (662.7/km^{2}). There were 7,220 housing units at an average density of 683.5 per square mile (263.9/km^{2}). The racial makeup of the city was 63.21% White, 23.19% Hispanic or Latino, 11.38% African American, 0.47% Native American, 1.12% Asian, 0.04% Pacific Islander, 9.63% from other races, and 2.15% from two or more races.

Of the 6,508 households, 41.0% had children under the age of 18 living with them, 56.5% were married couples living together, 13.9% had a female householder with no husband present, and 24.8% were not families. About 21.2% of all households were made up of individuals, and 8.7% had someone living alone who was 65 years of age or older. The average household size was 2.75 and the average family size was 3.19.

In the city, the population was distributed as 29.8% under the age of 18, 9.0% from 18 to 24, 30.3% from 25 to 44, 20.1% from 45 to 64, and 10.8% who were 65 years of age or older. The median age was 33 years. For every 100 females, there were 94.0 males. For every 100 females age 18 and over, there were 88.9 males.

The median income for a household in the city was $42,184, and for a family was $50,019. Males had a median income of $39,711 versus $23,508 for females. The per capita income for the city was $17,915. About 8.9% of families and 11.1% of the population were below the poverty line, including 14.4% of those under age 18 and 13.8% of those age 65 or over.

== Economy ==
Benchmark Electronics was based in Angleton until 2017, when it moved to Tempe, Arizona.

Country Hearth Inn, originally known as Homeplace, opened its first location in Angleton in 1983.

The Texas Department of Criminal Justice (TDCJ) operates the Angleton District Parole Office in Angleton. In addition, the TDCJ Retrieve Unit (later Wayne Scott Unit) was formerly located in an unincorporated area near Angleton. The main prison closed in 2020.

== Arts and culture ==
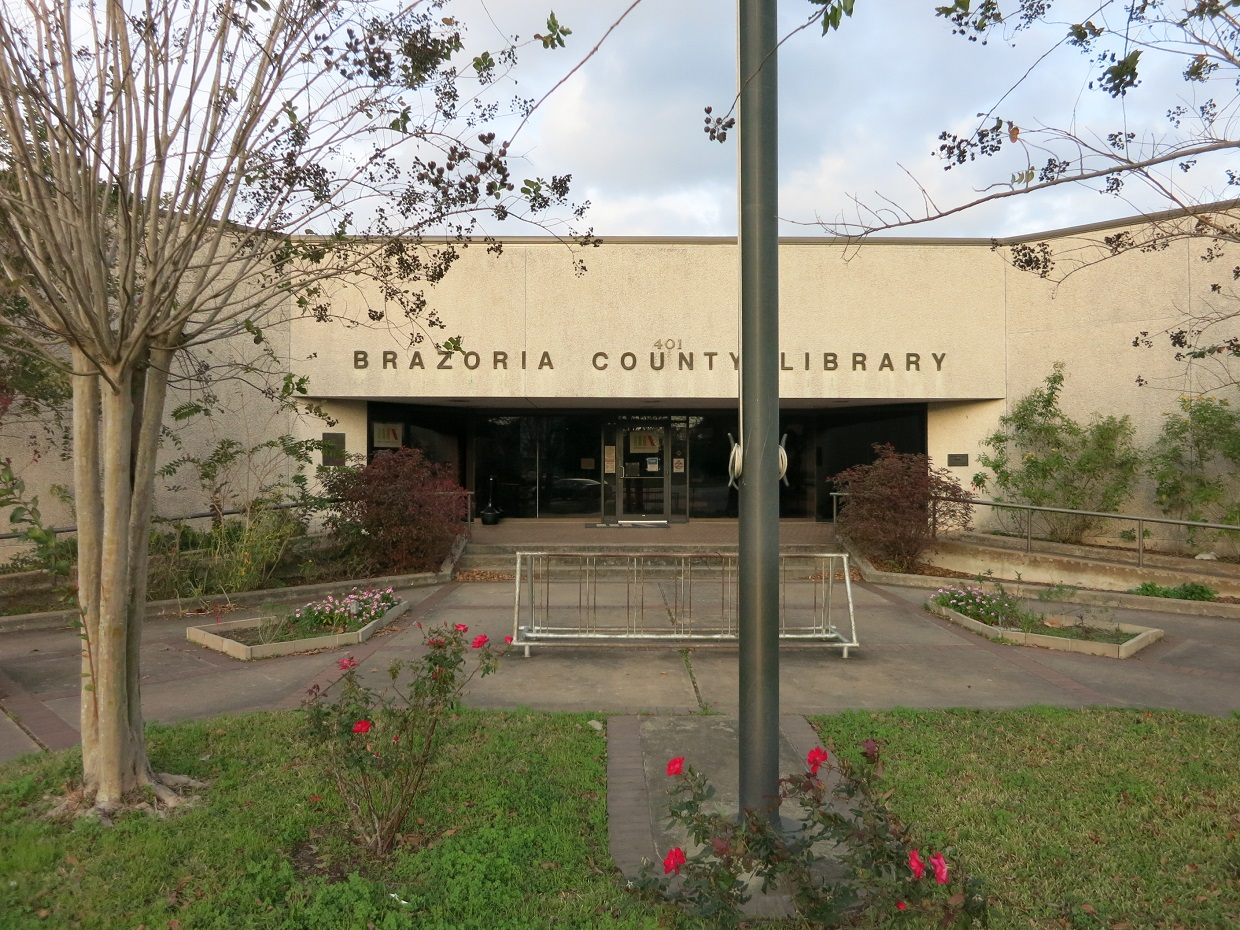
Brazoria County Library in Angleton

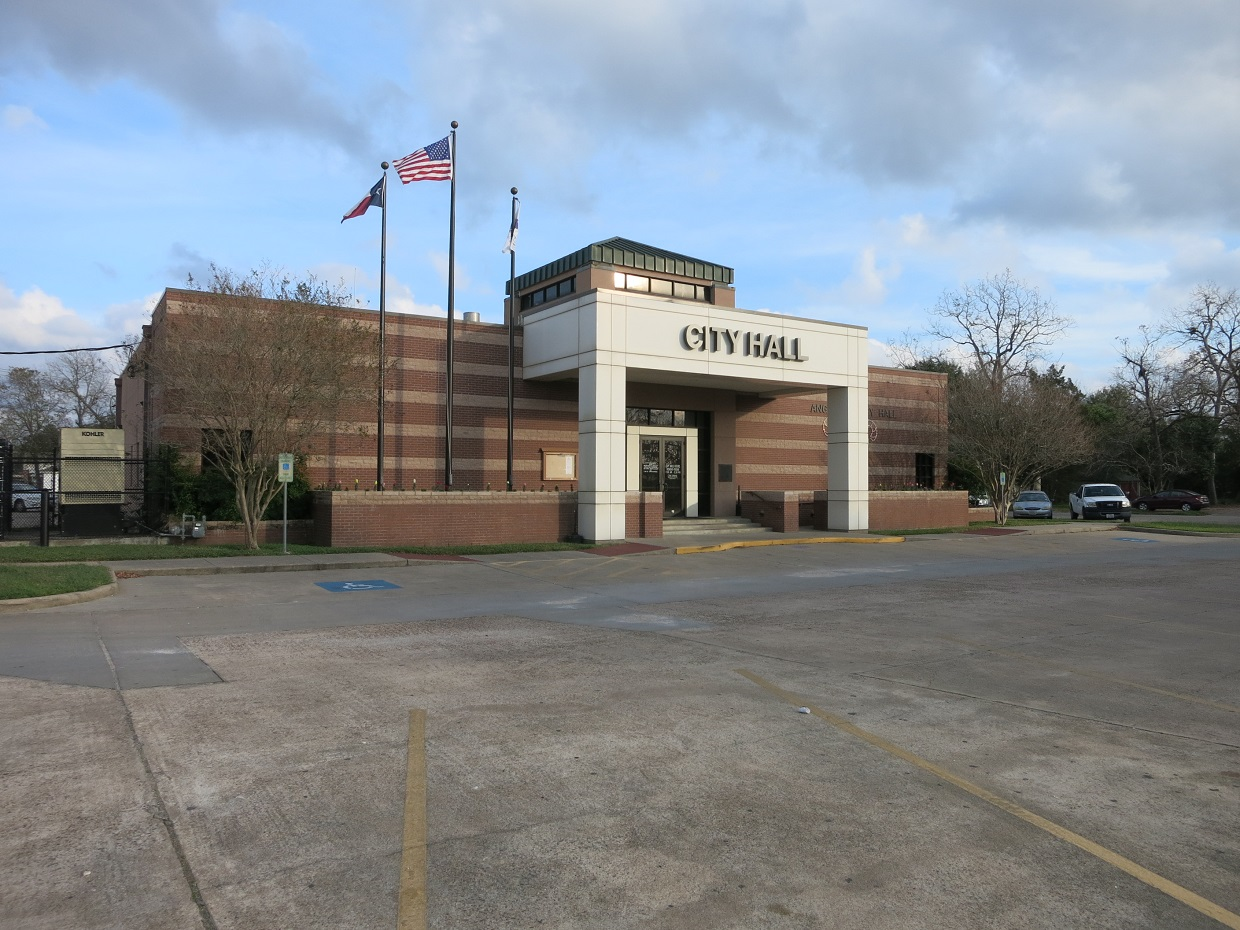
Angleton City Hall

Angleton hosts the Brazoria County Fair every October; it is Texas's largest county fair.

The Angleton Library and the Brazoria County Historical Museum Library are a part of the Brazoria County Library System.

== Parks and recreation ==
Angleton is home to eight parks.

- Bates Park
- Brushy Bayou Park
- Dickey Park
- Freedom Park
- Lakeside Park
- Masterson Park
- B. G. Peck Soccer Complex and Park
- Veterans Park

== Education ==
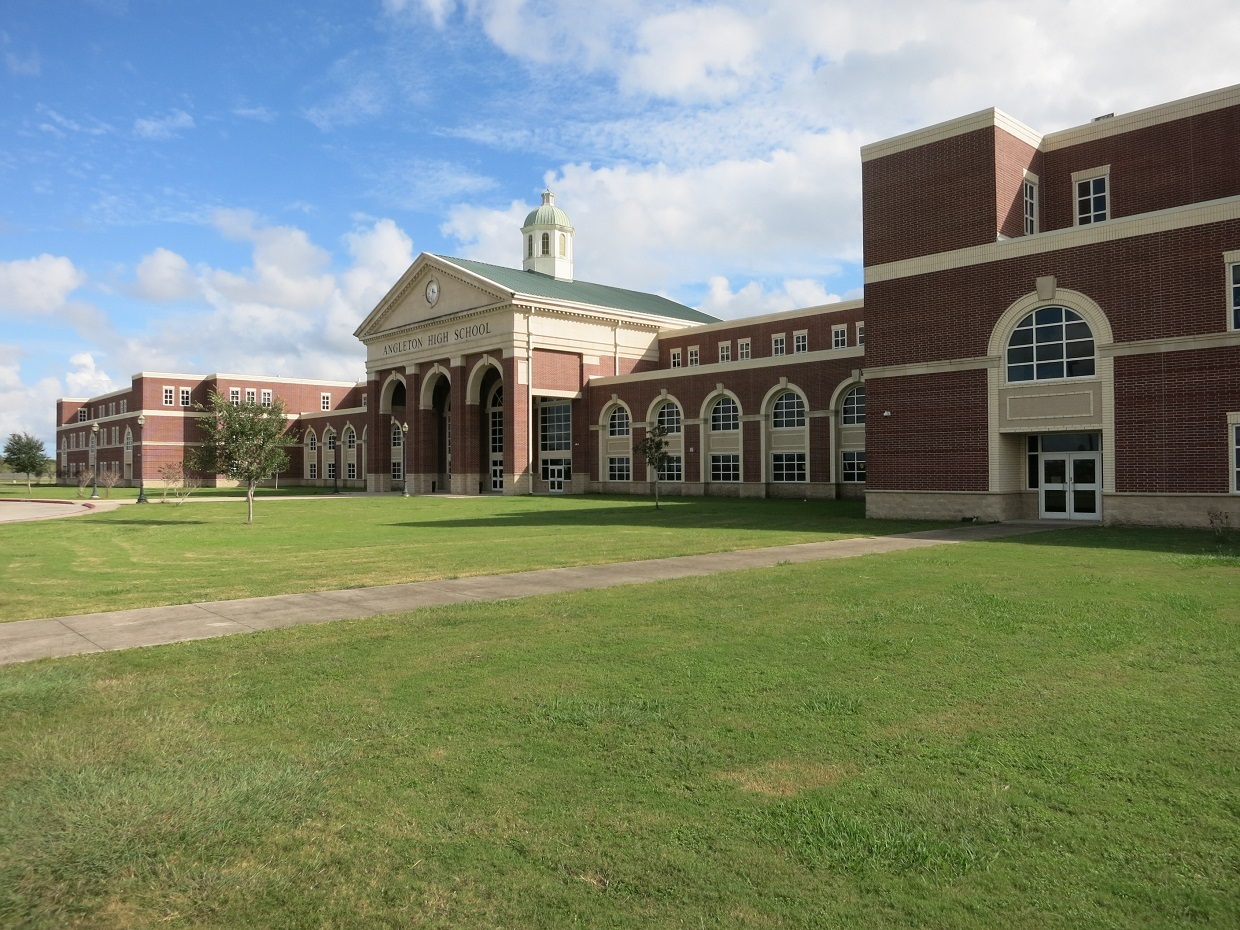
Angleton High School

=== Public schools ===
The public schools in the city are operated by Angleton Independent School District.

==== High schools ====
- Angleton High School (Grades 9–12)

==== Junior high schools ====
- Angleton Junior High School (Grades 6–8)
- Heritage Junior High School (Grades 6-8)

==== Elementary schools ====
- Central Elementary (Grades PK–5)
- Frontier Elementary (Grades K–5)
- Heartland Elementary (Grades K-5)
- Northside Elementary (Grades PK–5)
- Rancho Isabella Elementary (Grades K–5)
- Southside Elementary (Grades K–5)
- Westside Elementary (Grades K–5)

==== Alternative instructional ====
- Angleton High School - ACE (Grades 9–12)
- Brazoria County Juvenile Detention (Grades 5–12)
- Brazoria County Alternative Education Center (Grades 3–12)
- Student Alternative Center (DAEP Grades 1–12)

=== Private schools ===
- Angleton Christian School

=== Colleges and universities ===
The Texas Legislature designated portions of Angleton ISD that by September 1, 1995, had not been annexed by Alvin Community College as in the Brazosport College zone. As Angleton is not in the maps of Alvin CC, it is in the Brazosport College zone.

== Media ==
Brazosport Facts is based in nearby Clute and the Houston Chronicle is based in Houston.

Angleton Times operated until 2004. Five employees were hired by The Facts, which also acquired the former newspaper's reader list.

== Infrastructure ==
=== Transportation ===
Texas State Highway 288, a four-lane freeway, runs along the western edge of the city, with access from five exits. Highway 288 leads north 43 miles (69 km) to downtown Houston and south 18 miles (29 km) to Freeport near the Gulf of Mexico. Texas State Highway 35 crosses Highway 288 and passes through the center of Angleton, leading northeast 21 miles (34 km) to Alvin and west 37 miles (60 km) to Bay City.

Greyhound Bus Lines operates the Angleton Station at 530 East Mulberry Street, located in the city. Locally, Southern Brazoria County Transit provides bus service options for Angleton, along with Clute, Lake Jackson, and Freeport.

Angleton has no passenger rail service, although Union Pacific Railroad operates nearly all of the freight railroads through the city. Angleton is the site of a three-way junction of Union Pacific service.

Angleton's closest airport is Texas Gulf Coast Regional Airport, though the airport is exclusive to general aviation and has no regularly scheduled commercial service. Angleton's primary thruway for commercial air service is through Houston-area airports, with Houston Hobby Airport being the closest, though George Bush Intercontinental Airport being the closest for most international flights.

=== Emergency services ===
Emergency services include Angleton Police Department, Angleton Area Emergency Medical Corps, and Angleton Volunteer Fire Department.

== Notable people ==
- Danny Bible, Serial killer known as the “Icepick Killer”
- Dennis Bonnen, Republican member of Texas House of Representatives from District 25 from 1997 to 2021
- Greg Bonnen, Republican member of Texas House from District 24 in Galveston County
- Quandre Diggs, cornerback for the Detroit Lions and safety for the Seattle Seahawks
- Gilbert Gardner, linebacker for Colts
- Ahmard Hall, fullback for Tennessee Titans
- Quentin Jammer, cornerback for NFL's San Diego Chargers, Denver Broncos
- Ross Robinson, musician and record producer
- John Stockwell, CIA officer
- Rodney Terry, basketball head coach, University of Texas at Austin
- Emmitt Thomas, Hall of Fame cornerback for Kansas City Chiefs
- Keith Toston, running back for St. Louis Rams
- Cody Vasut, Republican member of Texas House of Representatives from District 25 since 2021
- Ray Willis, offensive tackle for Seattle Seahawks

== See also ==
- List of municipalities in Texas
