= Wild Peach Village, Texas =

Census-designated place in Brazoria County, Texas, United States

- Census-designated place
- Coordinates: 29°4′40″N 95°37′18″W
- Country: United States
- State: Texas
- County: Brazoria

Area
  - Total: 10.0 sq mi (25.9 km^{2})
  - Land: 10.0 sq mi (25.9 km^{2})
  - Water: 0 sq mi (0.0 km^{2})
- Elevation: 26 ft (8 m)

Population (2020)
  - Total: 2,329
  - Density: 245/sq mi (94.6/km^{2})
- Time zone: UTC-6 (Central (CST))
  - Summer (DST): UTC-5 (CDT)
- ZIP code: 77422
- Area code: 979
- FIPS code: 48-79192
- GNIS feature ID: 1867574

Wild Peach Village is a census-designated place (CDP) in Brazoria County, Texas, United States. Its population was 2,329 at the 2020 census.

== Geography ==
Wild Peach Village is located in western Brazoria County at 29°4′40″N 95°37′18″W (29.077715, -95.621717). Texas State Highway 36 forms the northeastern edge of the community and leads southeast 4 miles (6 km) to Brazoria and northwest 4 miles (6 km) to West Columbia.

According to the United States Census Bureau, the CDP has a total area of 10.0 square miles (25.9 km^{2}), all land.

== Demographics ==
Historical population
Census	Pop.	Note	%±
1980	2,385		—
1990	2,440		2.3%
2000	2,498		2.4%
2010	2,452		−1.8%
2020	2,329		−5.0%
U.S. Decennial Census; 1850–1900 1910; 1920 1930 1940; 1950 1960 1970; 1980 1990 2000; 2010

Wild Peach Village first appeared as a census designated place in the 1980 United States census.

=== 2020 census ===
Wild Peach Village CDP, Texas – Racial and ethnic composition Note: the US Census treats Hispanic/Latino as an ethnic category. This table excludes Latinos from the racial categories and assigns them to a separate category. Hispanics/Latinos may be of any race.
Race / Ethnicity (NH = Non-Hispanic)	Pop 2000	Pop 2010	Pop 2020	% 2000	% 2010	% 2020
White alone (NH)	1,931	1,829	1,627	77.30%	74.59%	69.86%
Black or African American alone (NH)	241	209	159	9.65%	8.52%	6.83%
Native American or Alaska Native alone (NH)	14	12	15	0.56%	0.49%	0.64%
Asian alone (NH)	6	11	15	0.24%	0.45%	0.64%
Native Hawaiian or Pacific Islander alone (NH)	0	0	0	0.00%	0.00%	0.00%
Other race alone (NH)	1	1	11	0.04%	0.04%	0.47%
Mixed race or Multiracial (NH)	41	34	82	1.64%	1.39%	3.52%
Hispanic or Latino (any race)	264	356	420	10.57%	14.52%	18.03%
Total	2,498	2,452	2,329	100.00%	100.00%	100.00%

As of the 2020 United States census, 2,329 people, 941 households, and 670 families resided in the CDP.

As of the 2000 census, 2,498 people, 882 households, and 701 families resided in the CDP. The population density was 248.5 inhabitants per square mile (95.9/km^{2}). The 989 housing units had an average density of 98.4 per square mile (38.0/km^{2}). The racial makeup of the CDP was 82.67% White, 9.69% African American, 0.64% Native American, 0.24% Asian, 4.44% from other races, and 2.32% from two or more races. Hispanics or Latinos of any race were 10.57% of the population.

Of the 882 households, 35.9% had children under 18 living with them, 65.1% were married couples living together, 9.6% had a female householder with no husband present, and 20.5% were not families. About 18.4% of all households were made up of individuals, and 7.1% had someone living alone who was 65 or older. The average household size was 2.83, and the average family size was 3.21.

In the CDP, the age distribution was 29.1% under 18, 8.3% from 18 to 24, 27.5% from 25 to 44, 24.1% from 45 to 64, and 10.9% who were 65 or older. The median age was 36 years. For every 100 females, there were 95.8 males. For every 100 females 18 and over, there were 96.2 males.

The median income for a household was $39,919 and for a family was $49,250. Males had a median income of $38,606 versus $23,705 for females. The per capita income for the CDP was $17,087. About 4.7% of families and 8.0% of the population were below the poverty line, including 7.8% of those under 18 and 7.1% of those 65 or over.

== History ==
The town was established as a residential development in the 1950s; by 1958, the town's community constructed a community center, a church, and several businesses, and a volunteer fire department was formed. The 1990 census reported a population of 2,440, and that number increased by the year 2000, when the population was 2,498.

== Education ==
Wild Peach Village is a part of the Columbia-Brazoria Independent School District.

Schools that serve the area include Wild Peach Elementary School (unincorporated Brazoria County), West Brazos Junior High School (Brazoria), and Columbia High School (West Columbia).

The Texas Legislature assigned the area in Columbia-Brazoria ISD (including Wild Peach Village) to the Brazosport College district.

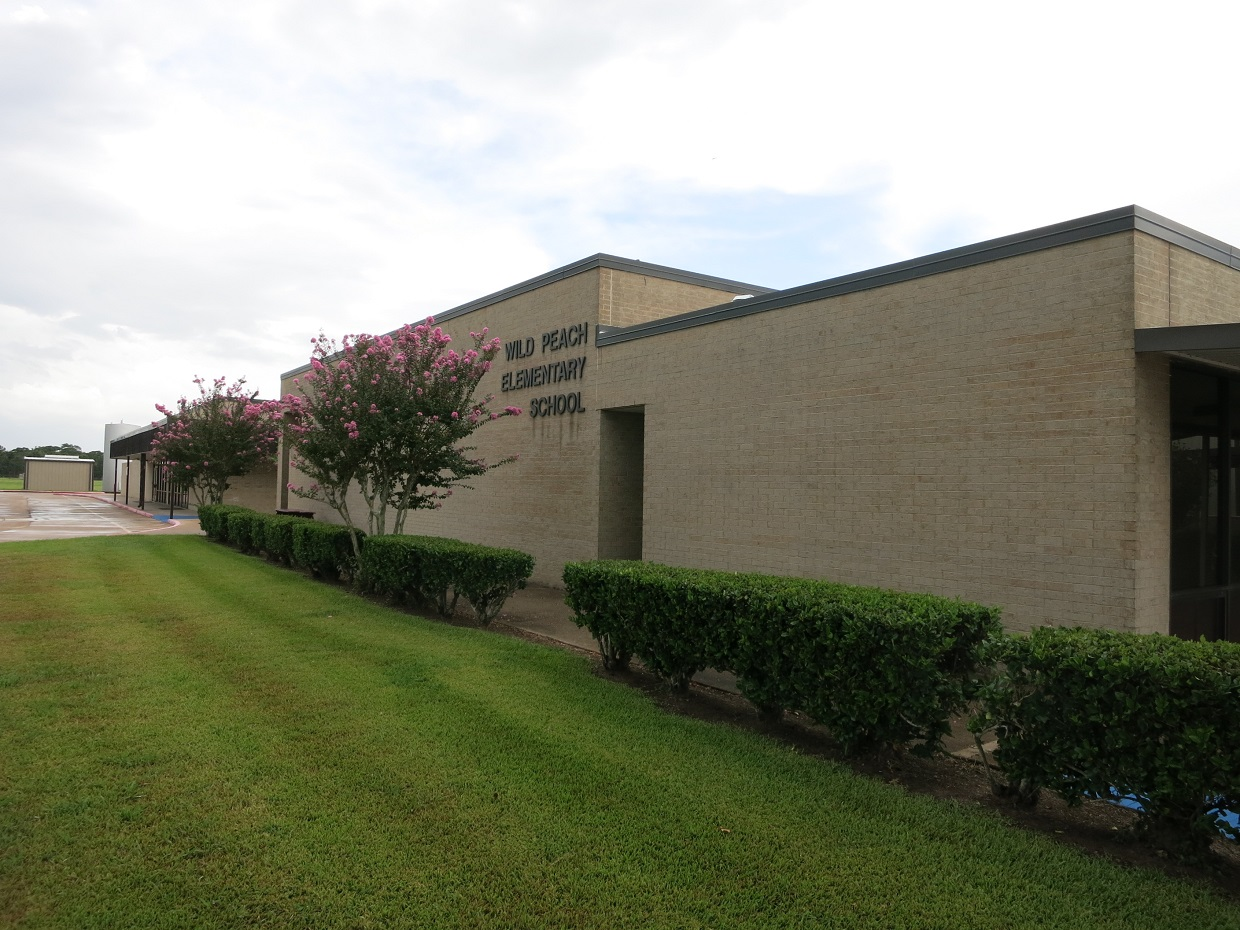
Wild Peach Elementary School on County Rd 353

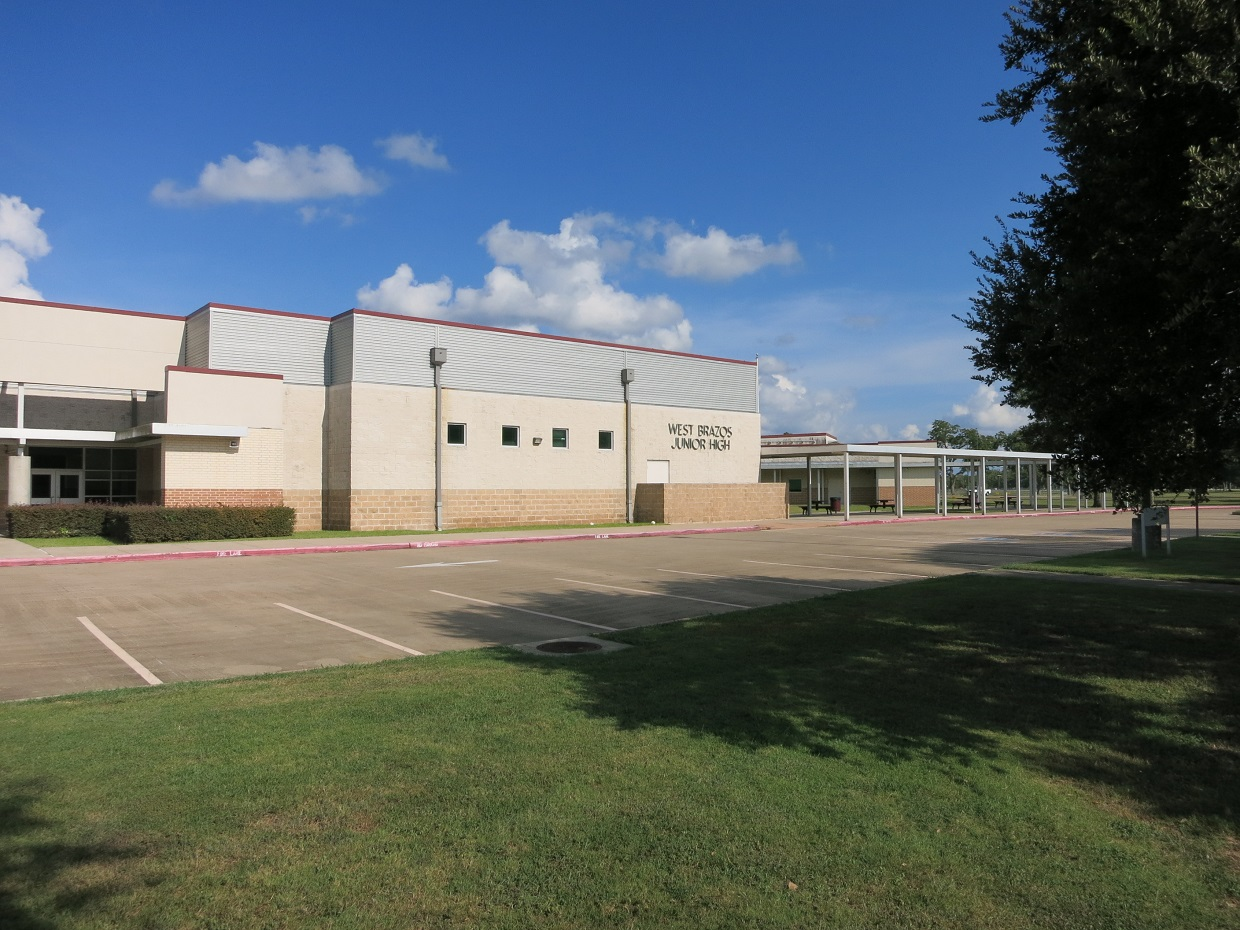
West Brazos Junior High School on Hwy 36

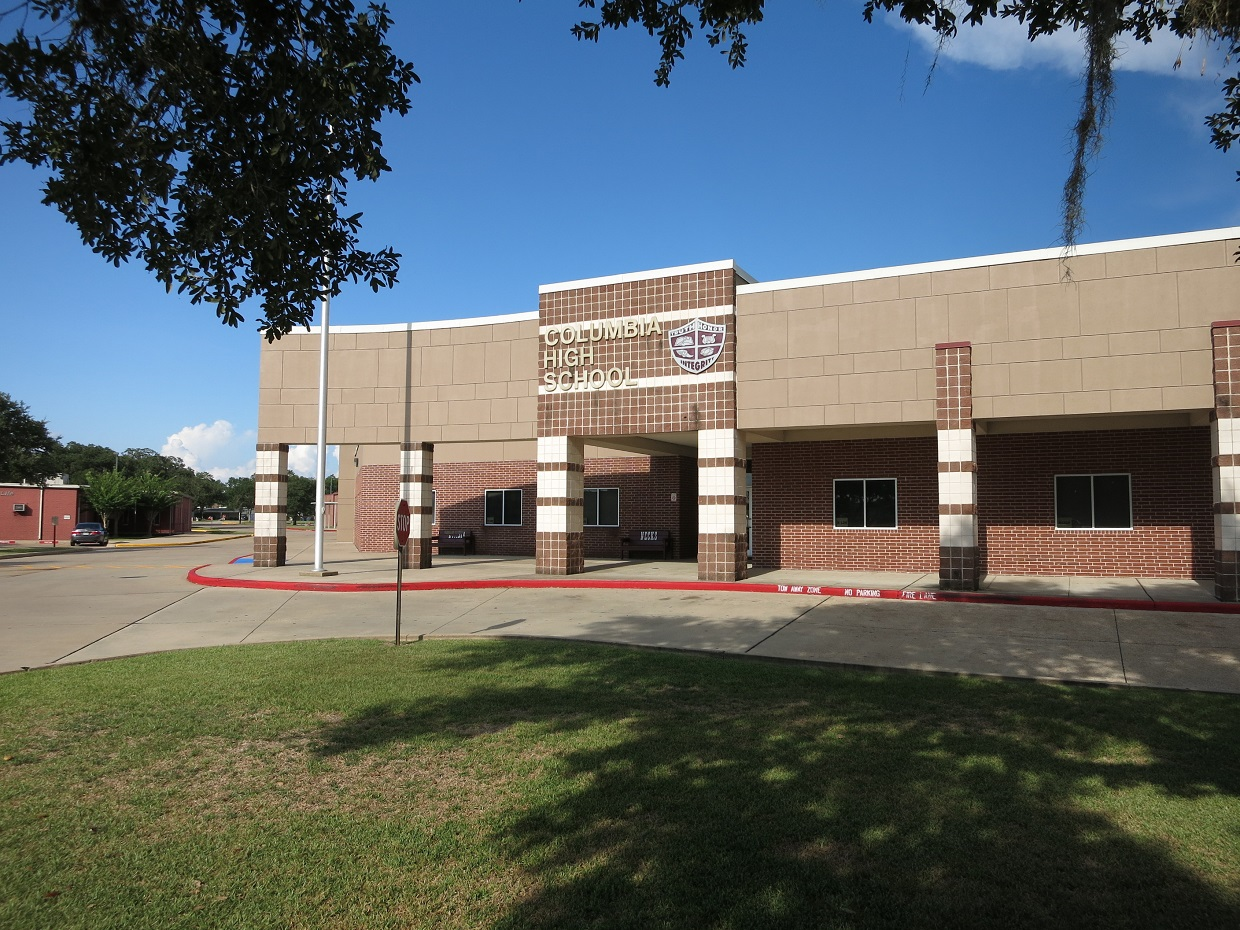
Columbia High School in West Columbia

== See also ==
- List of census-designated places in Texas
