= Brazoria, Texas =

City in Texas, US

- City
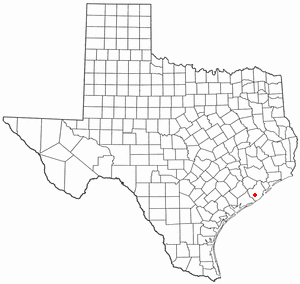
- Location of Brazoria, Texas

- Coordinates: 29°2′50″N 95°34′3″W
- Country: United States
- State: Texas
- County: Brazoria

Area
  - Total: 2.70 sq mi (7.00 km^{2})
  - Land: 2.70 sq mi (7.00 km^{2})
  - Water: 0 sq mi (0.00 km^{2})
- Elevation: 26 ft (7.9 m)

Population (2020)
  - Total: 2,866
  - Density: 1,130.3/sq mi (436.41/km^{2})
- Time zone: UTC-6 (Central (CST))
  - Summer (DST): UTC-5 (CDT)
- ZIP code: 77422
- Area code: 979
- FIPS code: 48-10072
- GNIS feature ID: 2409894
- Website: cityofbrazoria.org

Brazoria (/brəˈzɔːriə/ brə-ZOR-ee-ə) is a city in Brazoria County, Texas, United States, and is part of the Houston – Sugar Land metropolitan area. As of the 2020 census, the city population was 2,866.

== Geography ==
Brazoria is located southwest of the center of Brazoria County. The northeastern edge of the community, known as Old Brazoria, is located along the Brazos River. Texas State Highway 36 runs through the center of the city, leading southeast 16 miles (26 km) to Freeport and northwest 41 miles (66 km) to Rosenberg.

According to the United States Census Bureau, Brazoria has a total area of 2.6 square miles (6.8 km^{2}), all land.

== Demographics ==
Historical population
Census	Pop.	Note	%±
1870	725		—
1880	676		−6.8%
1890	432		−36.1%
1950	776		—
1960	1,291		66.4%
1970	1,681		30.2%
1980	3,025		80.0%
1990	2,717		−10.2%
2000	2,787		2.6%
2010	3,019		8.3%
2020	2,866		−5.1%
U.S. Decennial Census

=== 2020 census ===
As of the 2020 census, Brazoria had 2,866 people, 1,142 households, and 869 families residing in the city. The median age was 38.3 years, with 24.2% of residents under 18 and 17.0% were 65 or older. For every 100 females, there were 90.8 males, and for every 100 females 18 and over, there were 89.0 males 18 and over.

None of residents lived in urban areas, while all lived in rural areas.

Of the 1,142 households in Brazoria, 33.5% had children under 18 living in them, 44.5% were married-couple households, 17.5% were households with a male householder and no spouse or partner present, and 31.3% were households with a female householder and no spouse or partner present. About 26.1% of all households were made up of individuals, and 12.5% had someone living alone who was 65 or older.

Of the 1,297 housing units, 12.0% were vacant. Among occupied housing units, 65.3% were owner-occupied and 34.7% were renter-occupied. The homeowner vacancy rate was 1.8% and the rental vacancy rate was 8.7%.

Racial composition as of the 2020 census
Race	Percent
White	68.0%
Black or African American	10.0%
American Indian and Alaska Native	0.9%
Asian	0.5%
Native Hawaiian and other Pacific Islander	0.1%
Some other race	6.6%
Two or more races	13.9%
Hispanic or Latino (of any race)	21.6%

=== 2000 census ===
As of the census of 2000, 2,787 people, 1,063 households, and 736 families resided in the city. The population density was 1,489.4 inhabitants per square mile (575.1/km^{2}). The 1,166 housing units had an average density of 623.1 per square mile (240.6/km^{2}). The racial makeup of the city was 81.95% White, 10.30% African American, 0.57% Native American, 0.68% Asian, 5.38% from other races, and 1.11% from two or more races. Hispanic or Latino people of any race were 11.37% of the population.

Of the 1,063 households, 34.4% had children under 18 living with them, 53.2% were married couples living together, 11.5% had a female householder with no husband present, and 30.7% were not families. About 26.4% of all households were made up of individuals, and 10.9% had someone living alone who was 65 or older. The average household size was 2.62, and the average family size was 3.18.

In the city, the age distribution was 29.3% under 18, 8.8% from 18 to 24, 29.6% from 25 to 44, 20.6% from 45 to 64, and 11.7% who were 65 or older. The median age was 33 years. For every 100 females, there were 101.9 males. For every 100 females 18 and over, there were 101.3 males.

The median income in the city for a household was $36,058 and for a family was $41,563. Males had a median income of $35,000 versus $21,543 for females. The per capita income for the city was $16,666. About 10.8% of families and 13.3% of the population were below the poverty line, including 15.6% of those under 18 and 19.3% of those 65 or over.

== History ==
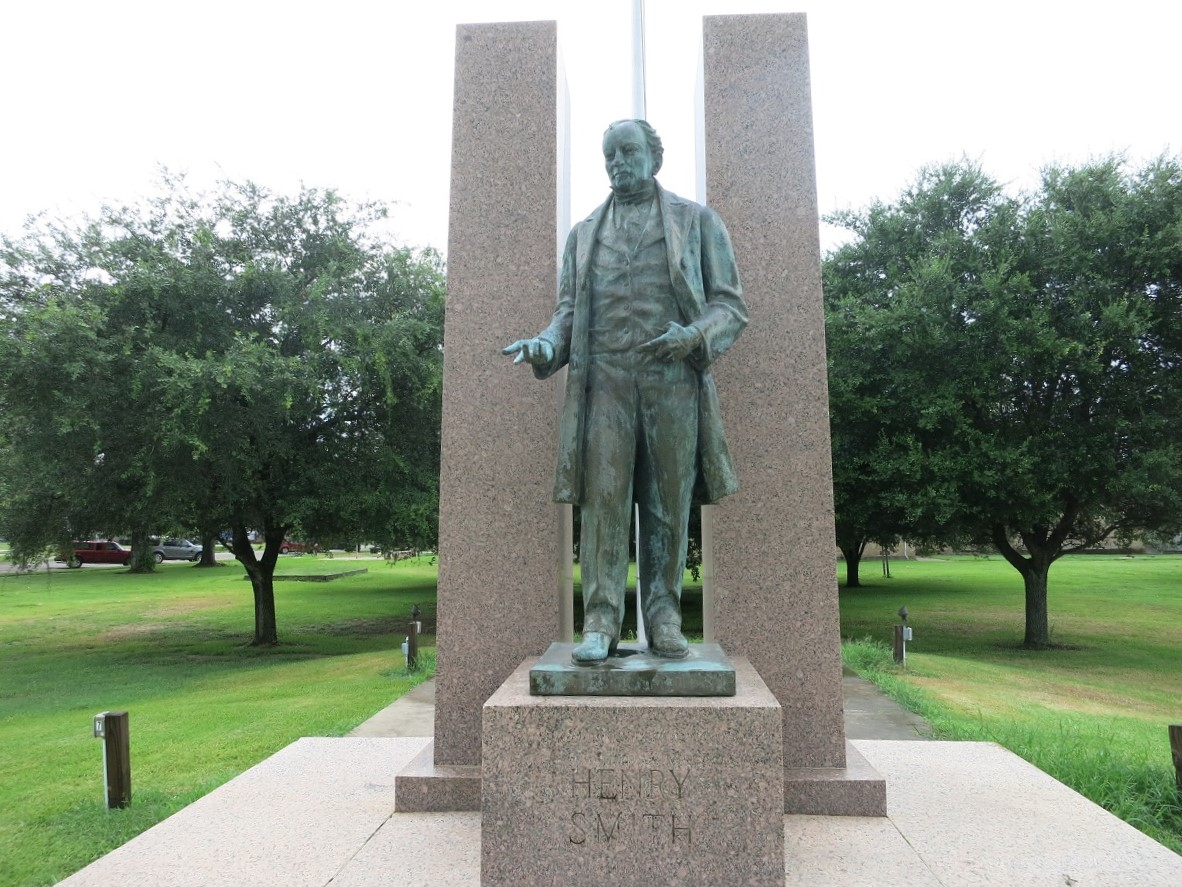
Henry Smith statue is in front of the Civic Center.

Brazoria was founded in 1828 on land granted by Stephen F. Austin to John Austin, who laid out the town. The town's name was selected by John Austin, "for the single reason that I know of none like it in the world". Supposedly, the first Masonic lodge in Texas was founded in 1835 when six men met under the Masonic Oak in Brazoria. The following year, the town was nearly deserted during the Runaway Scrape. H. M. Shaw opened a school in Brazoria in 1838 and a post office opened in 1846. The community's 1884 population was served by 12 general stores, five churches, three hotels, good schools, cotton gins, and sugar mills. By 1890, the town had become the county seat. Two years later, the Velasco World weekly newspaper began publishing in the town.

The railroad bypassed Brazoria, though, and it lost the county seat to Angleton in 1897. The town went into decline. The Brazoria school boasted three teachers and 142 students in 1906. The Banner weekly news started publishing in 1914. The local discovery of oil and sulfur in 1939 and the construction of a bridge across the Brazos River helped restore the town's fortunes. By 1987, Brazoria counted 50 businesses. Brazoria celebrates Frontier Days in March, the No Name Festival in June, and the Santa Ana Ball in July.

== Education ==
The city is served by the Columbia-Brazoria Independent School District.

Two public elementary schools serve Brazoria—Barrow Elementary, which is located in the city limits, and Wild Peach Elementary, which is located outside the city limits. West Brazos Junior High School is also located in Brazoria and serves all junior high school students in the Columbia-Brazoria Independent School District.

Students continue on to Columbia High School. Columbia High School is located the city of West Columbia.

The Texas Legislature assigned the area in Columbia-Brazoria ISD (including Brazosport) to the Brazosport College district.

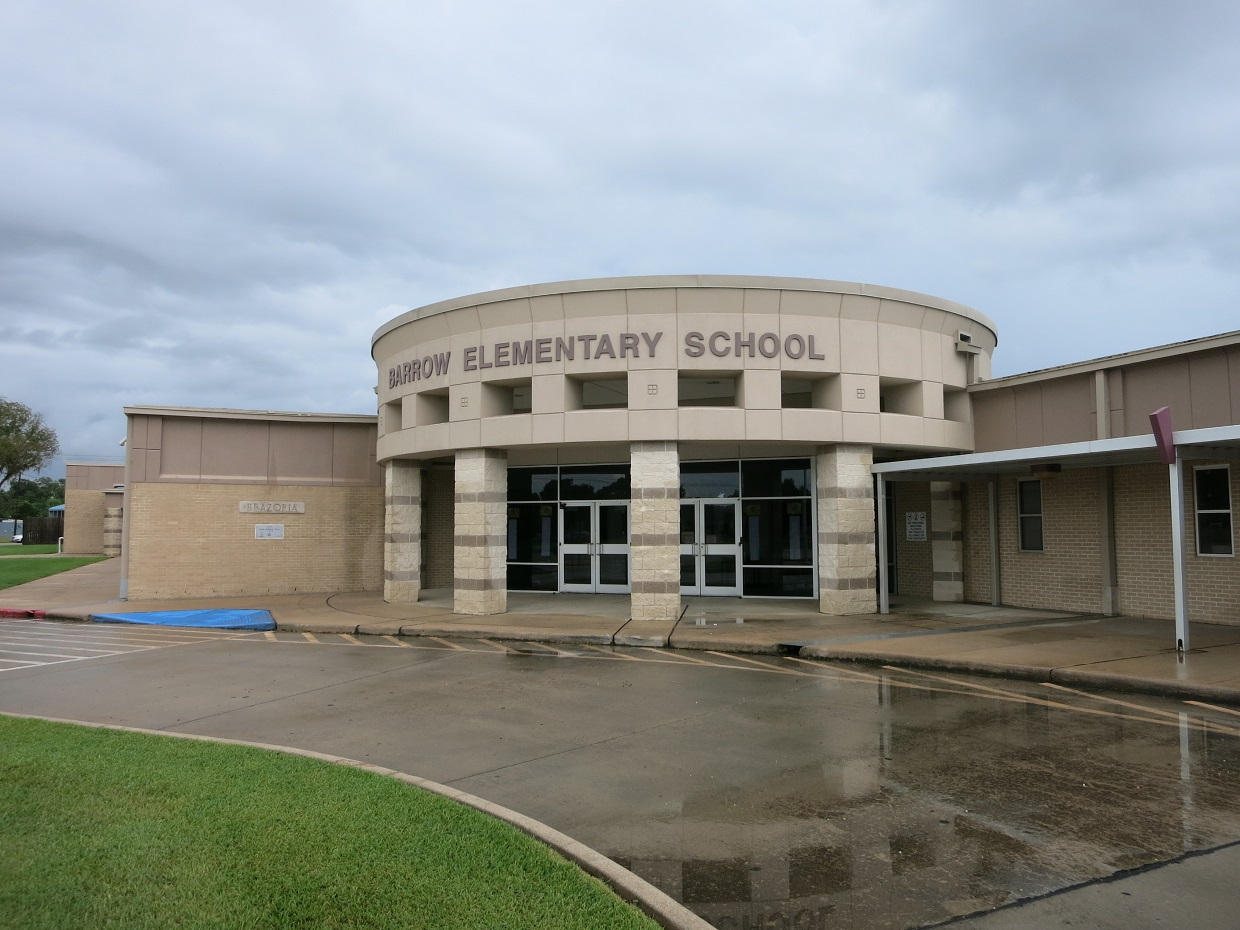
Barrow Elementary School on Gaines Street

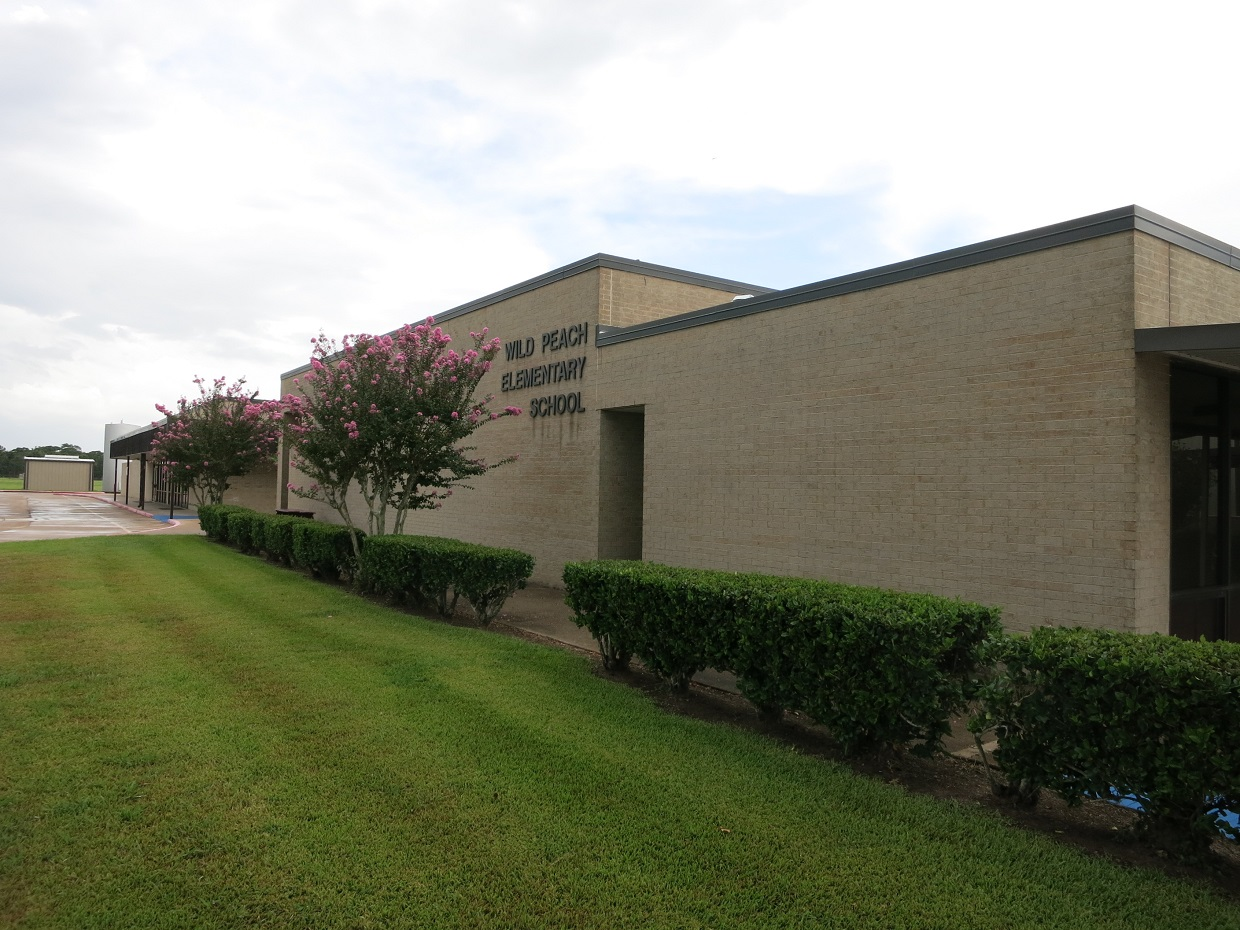
Wild Peach Elementary School on County Rd 353

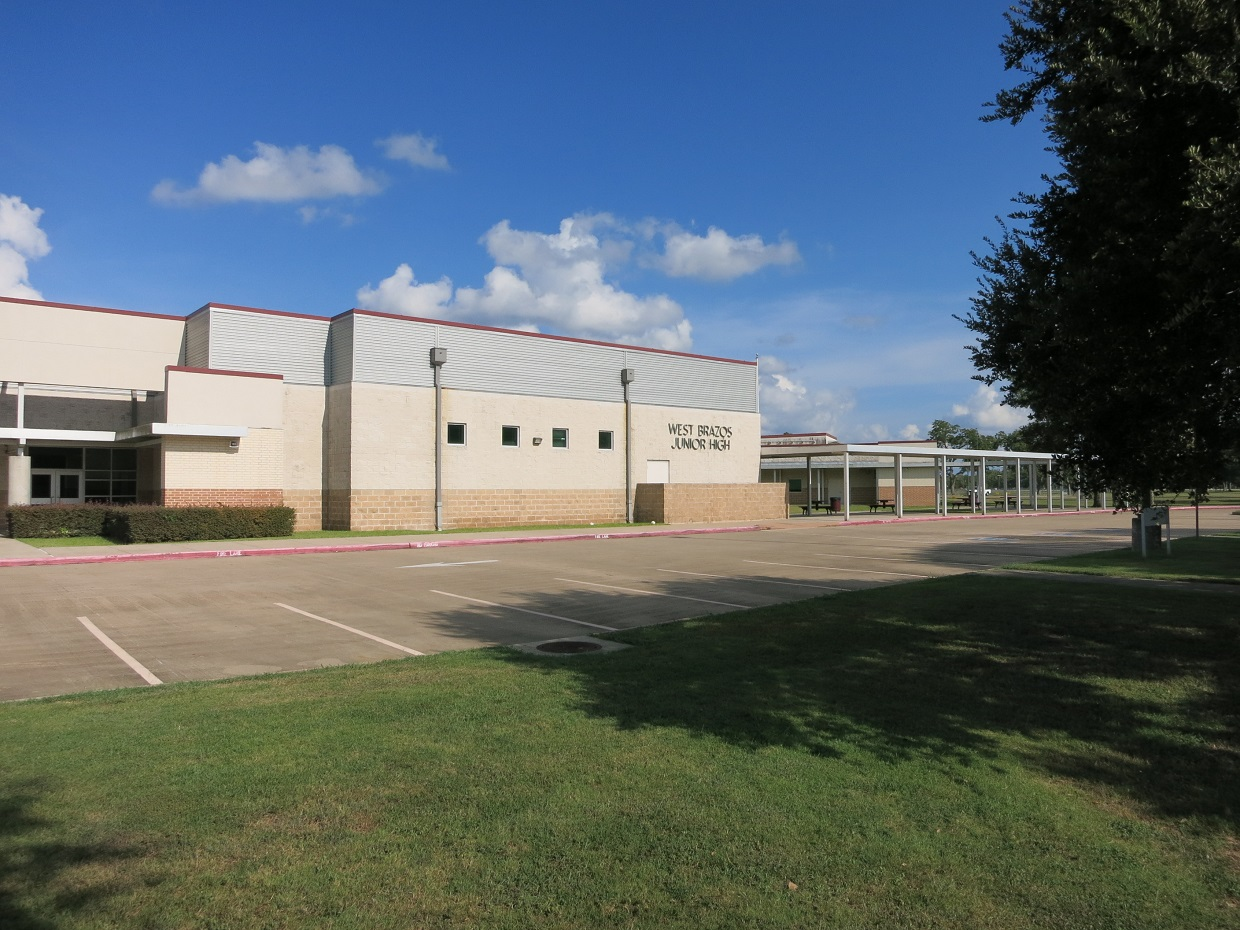
West Brazos Junior High School on Hwy 36

== Government and infrastructure ==
The Texas Department of Criminal Justice operates the Clemens Unit in an unincorporated area near Brazoria.

The Brazoria Library is a part of the Brazoria County Library System.

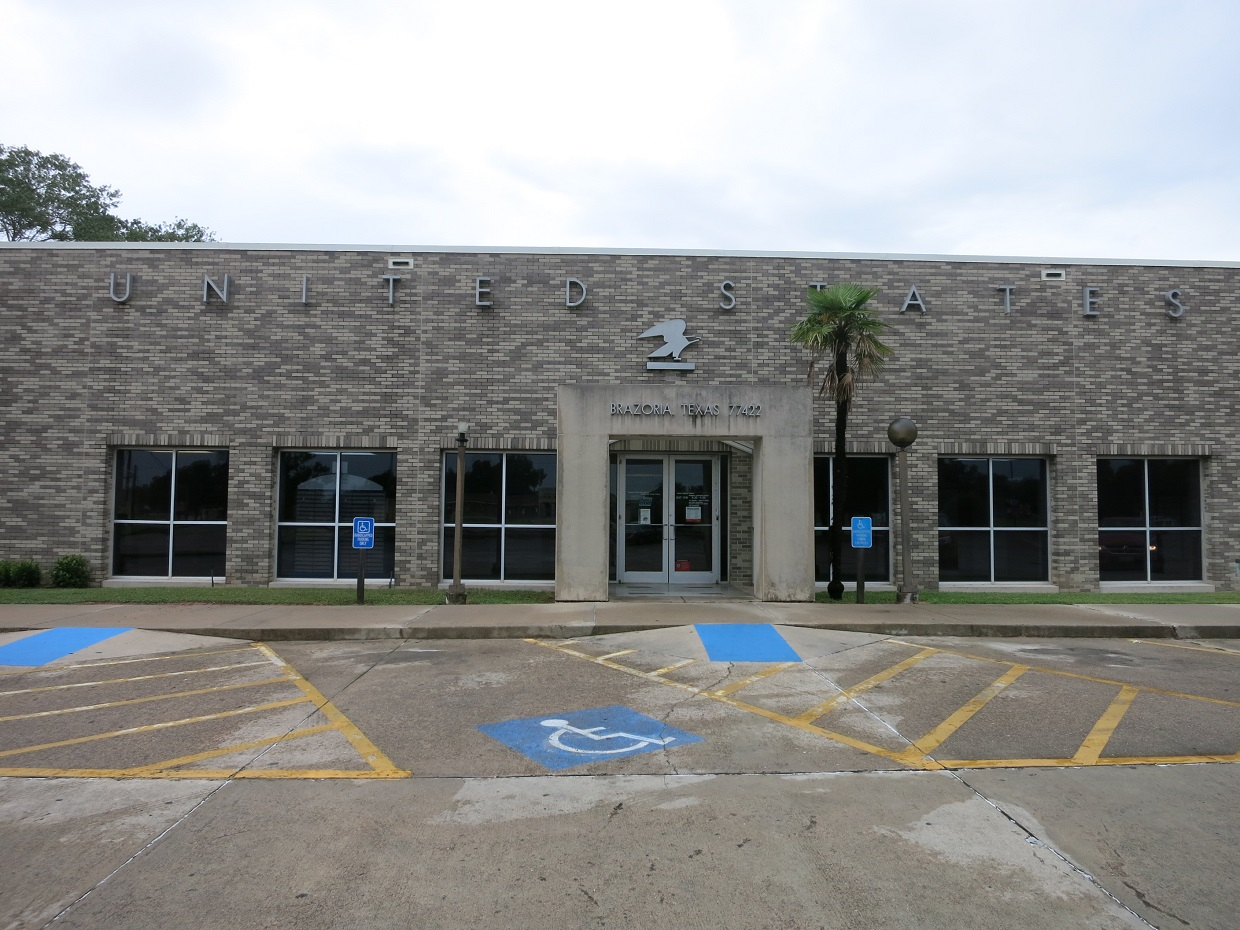
US Post Office in Brazoria

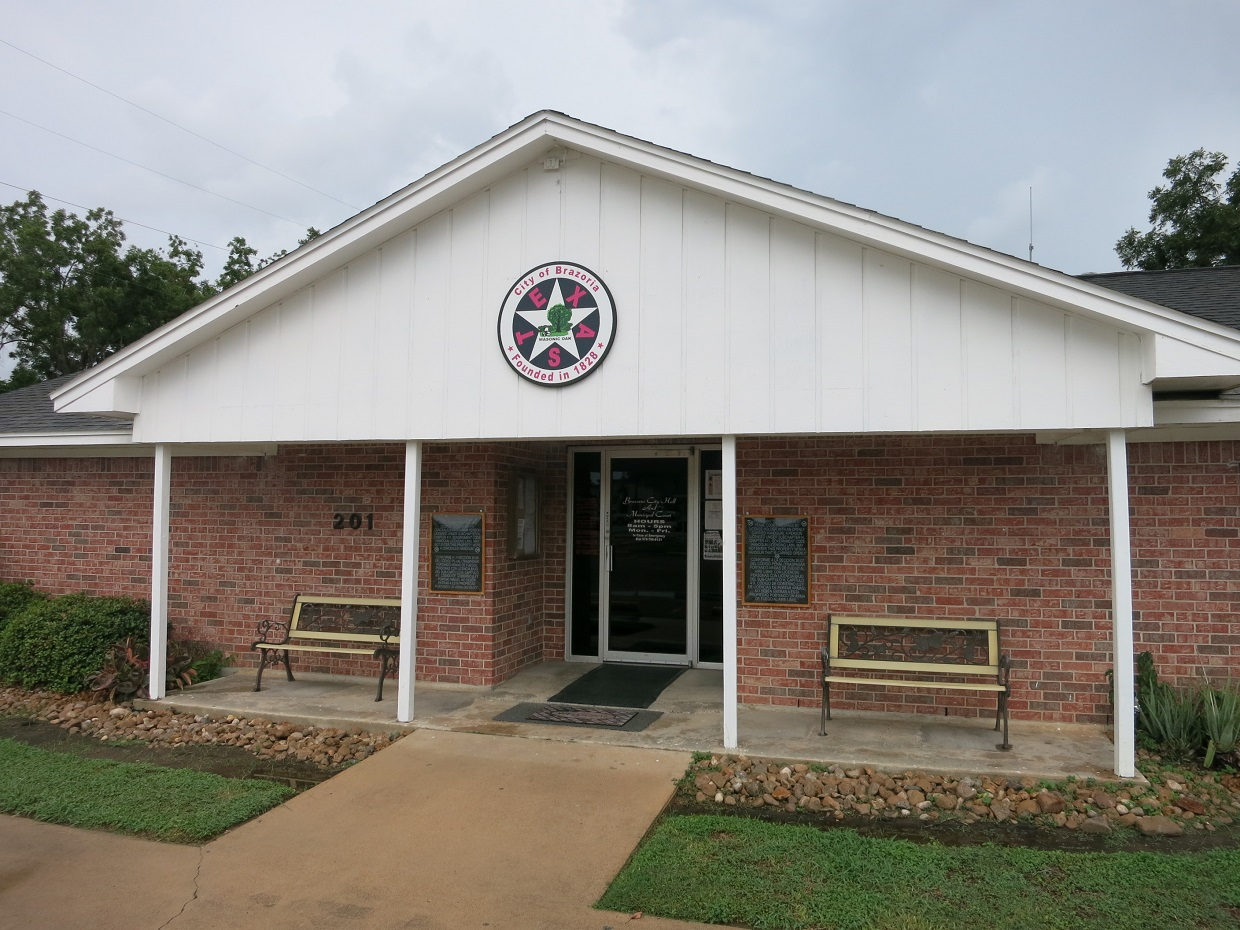
Brazoria Municipal Court Building

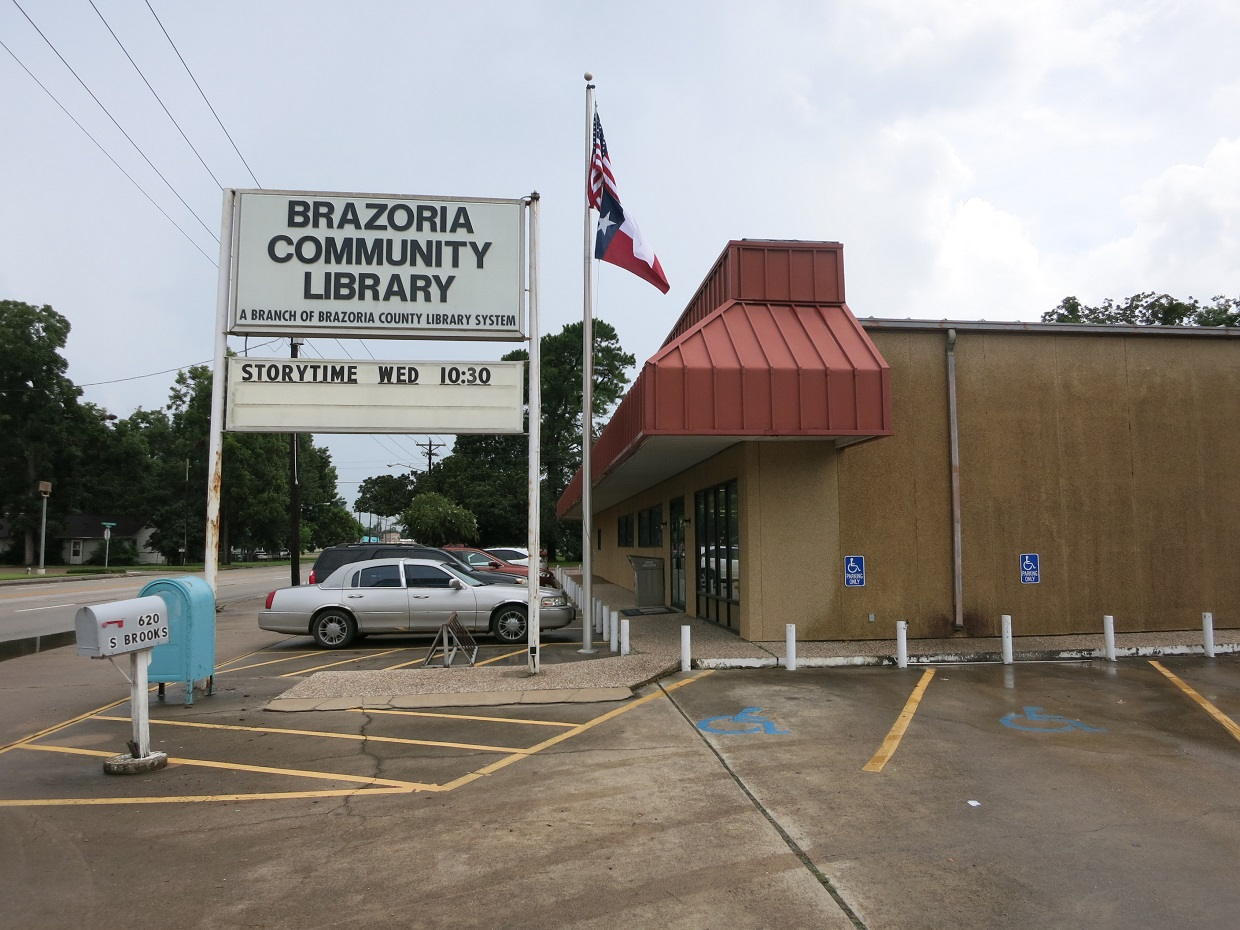
Brazoria Community Library

== Medical services ==
Brazoria is served by West Brazos EMS, which is operated by Sweeny Community Hospital. Although no hospital is within the city limits, Sweeny Community, Brazosport Regional, Matagorda Regional, and UTMB Angleton-Danbury Hospitals are all within driving distance.

== Transportation ==
Eagle Air Park (IATA code BZT) is the city airport.

== Climate ==
The climate in this area is characterized by hot, humid summers and generally mild to cool winters. According to the Köppen climate classification, Brazoria has a humid subtropical climate, Cfa on climate maps.

== Notable people ==
- Sofie Herzog, physician
- Clay Fuller, U.S. representative

== See also ==
- List of municipalities in Texas
