= Jim Ray Smith =

American football player (1932–2026)

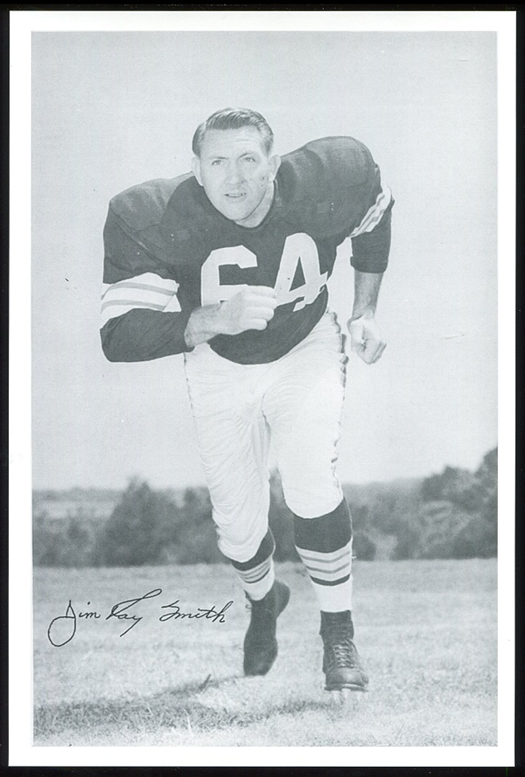
- Smith in 1961

No. 84, 64
- Positions: Guard, Defensive end

Personal information
- Born: February 27, 1932; West Columbia, Texas, U.S.
- Died: October 3, 2026 (aged 94)
- Listed height: 6 ft 3 in (1.91 m)
- Listed weight: 241 lb (109 kg)

Career information
- High school: Columbia (West Columbia)
- College: Baylor (1951–1954)
- NFL draft: 1954: 6th round, 64th overall pick

Career history
- Cleveland Browns (1956–1962); Dallas Cowboys (1963–1964)

Awards and highlights
- 3× First-team All-Pro (1959–1961); 2× Second-team All-Pro (1958, 1962); 5× Pro Bowl (1958–1962); Cleveland Browns Legends; First-team All-American (1953); Second-team All-American (1954); 2× First-team All-SWC (1953, 1954)

Career NFL statistics
- Games played: 93
- Games started: 77
- Fumble recoveries: 2
- Stats at Pro Football Reference
- College Football Hall of Fame

James Ray Smith (February 27, 1932 – October 3, 2026) was an American professional football player who was an offensive guard for nine seasons in the National Football League (NFL) for the Cleveland Browns and Dallas Cowboys. He played college football for the Baylor Bears.

== Early life ==
Smith attended West Columbia High School where he practiced four sports. He accepted a scholarship from Baylor University, where he was a two-way tackle and a three-year starter.

In 1968, he was inducted into the Baylor University Athletics Hall of Fame. In 1987, he was inducted into the College Football Hall of Fame. In 2008, he was inducted into the Texas Sports Hall of Fame.

== Professional career ==
=== Cleveland Browns ===
Smith was selected by the Cleveland Browns in the sixth round (64th overall) of the 1954 NFL draft with a future draft pick, which allowed the team to draft him before his college eligibility was over.

Because of military service in the U.S. Army (23 months), his rookie season began in November 1956, when he was tried at defensive end. Although he was one of the fastest players on the team, the next year he was moved to the offense and became one of Paul Brown's messenger offensive guards, splitting time with Herschel Forester. In 1958, he became a full-time starter and one of the best guards in the NFL, while blocking for future hall of fame running backs Jim Brown and Bobby Mitchell.

Although he retired after the 1961 season to devote himself full-time to his real estate business, the team was able to convince him to return. He retired again after the 1962 season, but the Dallas Cowboys convinced him to play in his home state and traded offensive tackle Monte Clark in exchange for his rights.

In 2005, he was inducted into the Cleveland Browns Legends.

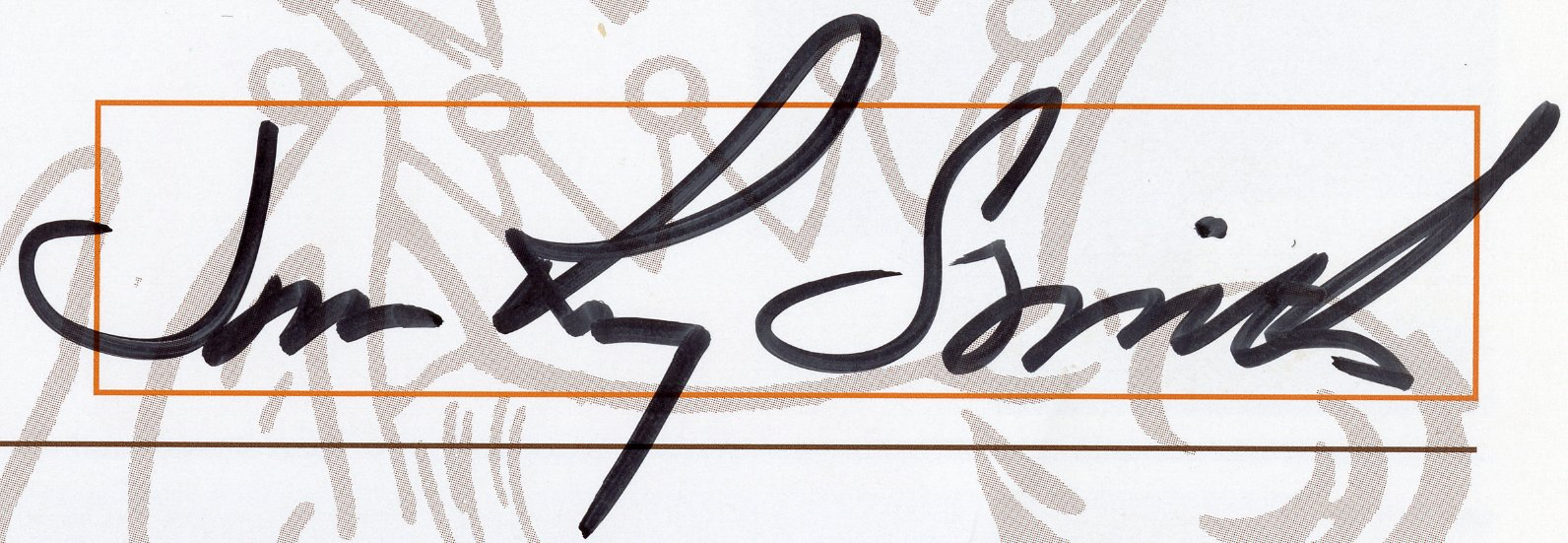

=== Dallas Cowboys ===
In 1963, he started seven games at left guard until suffering a knee injury during a kickoff return. The next year, he only played in four games (one start) after suffering a second knee injury. Although at times he played at the level of his previous years, his two seasons with the Cowboys were marred by two serious knee injuries, two broken hands and two concussions. He retired after the 1964 season.

== Personal life and death ==
Smith was a member of the board of directors for the Cotton Bowl Athletic Association.

Smith died on October 3, 2026, at the age of 94.
