= Charlie Johnson (defensive tackle) =

American football player (1952–2021)

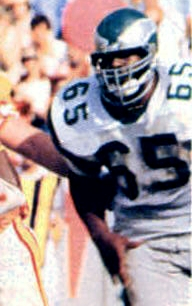
- Johnson with the Philadelphia Eagles in 1979

No. 65
- Position: Defensive tackle

Personal information
- Born: February 17, 1952; West Columbia, Texas, U.S.
- Died: August 13, 2021 (aged 69); Angleton, Texas, U.S.
- Listed height: 6 ft 3 in (1.91 m)
- Listed weight: 266 lb (121 kg)

Career information
- High school: Columbia (West Columbia, Texas)
- College: Colorado
- NFL draft: 1977: 7th round, 175th overall pick

Career history
- Philadelphia Eagles (1977–1981); Minnesota Vikings (1982–1984)

Awards and highlights
- 2× First-team All-Pro (1980, 1981); 3× Pro Bowl (1979–1981); Philadelphia Eagles 75th Anniversary Team; First-team All-Big Eight (1976)

Career NFL statistics
- Sacks: 18.5
- Fumble recoveries: 9
- Interceptions: 5
- Defensive touchdowns: 2
- Stats at Pro Football Reference

Charlie Johnson (February 17, 1952 – August 13, 2021) was an American professional football defensive tackle, known for playing the nose tackle position, who played for nine seasons in the National Football League (NFL), primarily with the Philadelphia Eagles. He played in Super Bowl XV for the Eagles, was selected to three Pro Bowls and was twice named first-team All-Pro by the Associated Press. Johnson's three interceptions in 1980 were remarkable because he was typically replaced by teammate Ken Clarke on passing downs. After serving with the U.S. Army during the Vietnam War, Johnson played college football for the Colorado Buffaloes.

== Early life ==
Johnson was born on February 17, 1952 to Ben Carrie and Anna May Johnson. His birthplace has been stated as Chambers County, Texas, but also as West Columbia, Texas, located in Brazoria County. His parents divorced when he was two-years old, and his mother later married Melvin Grice. She died when he was 13-years old. He had eight siblings.

Johnson attended West Columbia High School in West Columbia, Texas, graduating in 1970. He was a 225 lb (102.1 kg) fullback and defensive end on the school's football team. As a senior in 1969, he helped the team reach the Class 3A state championship game, losing to Brownwood High School at Baylor University's stadium in Waco, Texas. Johnson received the school's Marvin Gray award as the team's most valuable player. One of his teammates was future NFL running back Charlie Davis.

Despite being pursued by colleges offering him a football scholarship, including the University of Texas, the University of Southern California and Texas A&M, among others, upon graduating high school the 17-year old Johnson determined that he wanted to enlist in the United States Army. He served in the Army for three years, and spent nine months as a military policeman in Vietnam during the Vietnam War.

== College career ==
After returning to the United States, Johnson was stationed at Fort Riley, Kansas. Shortly before his discharge, he received a recruitment letter from Billy Andrews, the football coach at Tyler Junior College (TJC) in Tyler, Texas, who remembered Johnson from his playing days at West Columbia High. Johnson then attended Tyler in 1973; however, Johnson's weight had gone up to 285 pounds since high school. Andrews tried Johnson at fullback, but moved him to defensive line. As Johnson's conditioning improved, Andrews moved him to tight end the following season (1974); while also playing Johnson on the defensive line.

In 1974, Johnson, now 6 ft 3 in (1.91 m) 270 lb (122.5 kg), led TJC with 12 receptions for 184 yards. It was also reported he had 30 receptions. The leading junior college football publication, J.C. Grid-Wire, named Johnson a first-team junior college All-American at tight end. He was also unanimously selected first-team All-Conference at tight end. Johnson was named a National Junior College Athletic Association (NJCAA) All-American at tight end in 1974.

Johnson was recruited by a number of colleges and universities, and originally signed a letter of intent to attend Texas A&M in 1975. He changed his mind about attending Texas A&M because it reminded him too much of the military. Instead, he attended the Colorado University, where coach Bill Mallory made him a nose guard on defense. Johnson had been used at defensive tackle, but after Colorado's opening game in 1975, Mallory was disappointed in the team's defensive middle guard (nose guard/nose tackle). He decided to move Johnson over into that position with only one day of practice before the next game. Johnson performed well and knew he could handle the position. During the season he had 102 tackles in total, and 11 tackles for losses.

Johnson weighed 285 pounds during the 1975 regular season and was told to lose weight after the regular season ended. Colorado played the University of Texas Longhorns in the 1975 Bluebonnet Bowl on December 27, 1975, losing 38–21. By the date of that game, Johnson was down to 266 pounds, and believed it was his best game of the year, even with the loss, as he had more quickness and stamina. He began the 1976 season at 265 pounds. Johnson, who could bench press 430 pounds, believed he had not lost any strength, and had gained quickness because of the weight reduction.

In 1976, still at nose tackle, the Associated Press (AP) selected Johnson first-team All-Big Eight, and he was an honorable mention All-American. He received Colorado's Dave Jones award as the team's most valuable defensive lineman. Colorado played in the Orange Bowl that season, losing to Ohio State, 27–10. Johnson went out of the game with a sprained ankle or knee injury in the first half, with the game tied. Ohio State's offense improved with Johnson out of the game, and the Buckeyes had a 99-yard drive for a touchdown at the end of the first half in Johnson's absence.

== Professional career ==
=== Philadelphia Eagles ===
The Philadelphia Eagles, under future Hall of Fame head coach Dick Vermeil, selected Johnson in the seventh round of the 1977 NFL draft, 175th overall. Johnson started nine games at middle guard for the Eagles in 1977, in the Eagles 3–4 defense. He had seven quarterback sacks and two fumble recoveries. He also had 90 tackles. He suffered a knee injury early in the team's 12th game of the season, against the Dallas Cowboys, and missed the rest of that game and the final two games of the season. The Eagles were 5–9 in 1977.

Johnson had leg surgery before the 1978 season, and also improved his upper body strength during the offseason. In 1978, he became a fulltime Eagles' starter for all 16 games, and had 2.5 sacks. By the end of the season, the Eagles front three consisted of Dennis Harrison and Carl Hairston at the defensive end positions, with Johnson at nose tackle, under defensive coach Marion Campbell. The Eagles finished with a 9–7 record, their first winning season since 1966. The Eagles lost 14–13 in the National Football Conference's wild card playoff round to the Atlanta Falcons. In that game, Johnson had two solo tackles for no gain, and a combined tackle with linebacker Bill Bergey for a one yard gain.

In 1979, Johnson again started all 16 games, with three sacks, three forced fumbles and two fumble recoveries. He was selected to the NFC Pro Bowl team. He was named first-team All-NFC at nose tackle by The Sporting News, United Press International (UPI), the Newspaper Enterprise Association (NEA) and Pro Football Weekly (PFW). The Eagles were 11–5 on the season, and defeated the Chicago Bears in the wild card round of the 1979 playoffs, 27–17. Johnson and linebacker John Bunting combined for a sack of Bears' quarterback Mike Phipps in the first quarter; and Johnson also recovered a fourth quarter fumble. The Eagles lost to the Tampa Bay Buccaneers in the divisional round of the playoffs, 24–17. Johnson had eight tackles in the game (six for two yards or less and two for three yards).

In 1980, the Eagles were 12–4 and reached the Super Bowl. The Eagles defense led the NFL in fewest points allowed and was second in fewest yards allowed. Johnson again started all 16 games. Even though a defensive lineman, he had three interceptions. He also had one forced fumble, but no sacks. He was platooned at nose tackle with Ken Clarke, who would regularly rotate into the game on passing plays and had seven sacks on the season. He had an interception on October 19 against the Dallas Cowboys off a tipped pass by John Bunting that was key in the Eagles 17–10 victory. In a November 16 game against Washington he had another interception, and also knocked a ball loose that linebacker Jerry Robinson recovered and returned for a touchdown. His third interception came against the Atlanta Falcons on December 7.

The Eagles reached Super Bowl XV, losing to the Oakland Raiders, 27–10. Johnson started at nose tackle, and had a sack and six tackles. He was again selected to the NFC Pro Bowl team. He was named first-team All-Pro by the AP, UPI and PFW, and second-team All-Pro by the NEA.

In 1981, Johnson again started all 16 games at nose tackle, with Clarke rotating in on passing plays. Johnson had another interception and two fumble recoveries, but again no sacks. He was selected to play in the Pro Bowl for the third straight year. He was named first-team All-Pro by the AP for a second consecutive season, and first-team All-Conference by PFW and UPI. The Eagles were 10–6 and lost to the New York Giants in the playoff wild card round, 27–21. The Eagles defense was first in the NFL in fewest points allowed and fewest total yards allowed.

During training camp in 1982, Johnson asked to be traded, rather than go through coach Dick Vermeil's arduous training camp another year. After the two met in early August, Vermeil asked Johnson to leave training camp for a few days, wanting to remove any negative influence on others and in hopes that Johnson might change his mind. Vermeil himself said at the time that Johnson had told Vermeil he felt worn down, and that he might have a longer career with another team where the physical demands of training camp were not as great. Vermeil also recognized that nose tackle was the most physically demanding position in football. Johnson said that at 30 years old, he would like to reserve his hardest playing for the actual games, in hopes of playing until he was 35. Ideally, he wanted a trade to a West Coast team in more clement weather as well, and closer to his residence. During this difficult period, both Johnson and Vermeil publicly expressed respect for each other, and Vermeil later said of Johnson "'I loved the guy'". Ironically, Vermeil himself resigned after the 1982 season, "'burned out'" at 46-years old from his intense and emotional approach to coaching, and intensity of feeling he had for others.

Vermeil believed that Johnson's All-Pro status merited a high draft pick in any trade. Tampa Bay and the Cleveland Browns showed some interest, and Vermeil reached out to the 49ers head coach Bill Walsh, as Johnson had made clear his interest in playing for San Francisco or the Oakland Raiders (as Johnson lived in Northern California). Two weeks after Johnson's initial demand, the Eagles traded Johnson to the Minnesota Vikings for a 1983 second round draft pick.

=== Minnesota Vikings ===
In 1982 with the Vikings, Johnson played all nine games in the strike-shortened season, starting six. In a December 19 game against the Detroit Lions, Johnson recovered a fumble and ran 44 yards for the game-winning touchdown in the Vikings 34–31 victory. After the season, future Hall of Fame Vikings head coach Bud Grant stated that the Vikings' defense benefitted from Johnson's presence in the 1982 season, observing "'Charlie Johnson brought us good work habits'".

In 1983, he started all 16 games at nose tackle for the Vikings. He had another interception, two forced fumbles and one sack. In an October 16 game against the Houston Oilers, Vikings defensive end Neil Elshire forced a fumble that Johnson recovered and ran in 50 yards for a touchdown. Johnson finished his career in 1984 with the Vikings. He started 15 games with two forced fumbles and four sacks. This was his highest sack total since his rookie season, and the second highest of his career. Grant released Johnson, among other older players, before the start of the 1985 season, as the Vikings wanted to rebuild with younger players.

== Honors ==
Johnson was selected to the Philadelphia Eagles 75th Anniversary Team. In 2007, he was inducted into the Columbia High School’s Athletics Hall of Honor.

== Personal life and death ==
Johnson remained an avid Eagles fan after his retirement, and often spoke positively of playing for Dick Vermeil.

Johnson died at his home in Angleton, Texas, on August 13, 2021, at the age of 69. He was buried in Houston National Cemetery in Houston, Texas.
