= Dennis Gaubatz =

American football player (born 1940)

No. 53
- Position: Linebacker

Personal information
- Born: February 11, 1940 (age 86); Needville, Texas, U.S.
- Listed height: 6 ft 2 in (1.88 m)
- Listed weight: 232 lb (105 kg)

Career information
- High school: Columbia (West Columbia, Texas)
- College: LSU
- NFL draft: 1963: 8th round, 111th overall pick
- AFL draft: 1963: 25th round, 199th overall pick

Career history
- Detroit Lions (1963–1964); Baltimore Colts (1965–1969); Washington Redskins (1970)*
- * Offseason or practice squad member only

Awards and highlights
- NFL champion (1968); Second-team All-SEC (1962)

Career NFL statistics
- Fumble recoveries: 6
- Interceptions: 10
- Sacks: 11.5
- Stats at Pro Football Reference

Dennis Earl Gaubatz (Pronounced: GAW-bats) (born February 11, 1940) is an American former professional football player who was a linebacker in the National Football League (NFL) for the Detroit Lions and the Baltimore Colts.

Gaubatz played college football for the LSU Tigers and was selected in the eighth round of the 1963 NFL draft by the Lions with the 111th overall pick. He was traded to the Colts for running back Joe Don Looney and an undisclosed draft choice on June 3, 1965.

He intercepted ten passes and recovered six fumbles in his seven-year NFL career, and was part of the Colts' 1968 NFL Championship team.

Gaubatz was on the cover of Sports Illustrated in November 1965.
