= Columbia-Brazoria Independent School District =

School district in Texas, United States

Address
- 520 S. 16th Street West Columbia, Brazoria County, Texas, 77486; United States

District information
- Motto: Catch the Challenge, Learn for Life!
- Superintendent: Steven Galloway
- Asst. superintendent(s): Lynn Grell-boethel; Chris Miller
- School board: Greg Kresta (1); Becky Danford (2); Ray Sisson (3); Jana Reed (4); Julie Taylor (5); Jackie Gotcher (6); Linda Huebner (7)
- Chair of the board: Linda Huebner
- Schools: Columbia High; West Brazos Jr. High; Barrow Elementary; West Columbia Elem. Wild Peach Elem.
- NCES District ID: 4814670

Students and staff
- Students: 2,954 (2023–2024)
- Teachers: 194.38 (on an FTE basis)
- Student–teacher ratio: 15.20:1
- Colors: Maroon

Other information
- Website: www.cbisd.com

Columbia-Brazoria Independent School District (CBISD) is a public school district based in the Kenneth C. Welch Administration Building in West Columbia, Texas (USA).

In addition to West Columbia, the district serves the city of Brazoria as well as the unincorporated communities of Wild Peach Village, Danciger, and East Columbia.

In 2009, the school district was rated "academically acceptable" by the Texas Education Agency.

== Schools ==
- Columbia High School (Grades 9-12)
- West Brazos Junior High (Grades 7-8)
- Barrow Elementary (Grades PK-6)
- West Columbia Elementary (Grades PK-6)
- Wild Peach Elementary (Grades K-5)
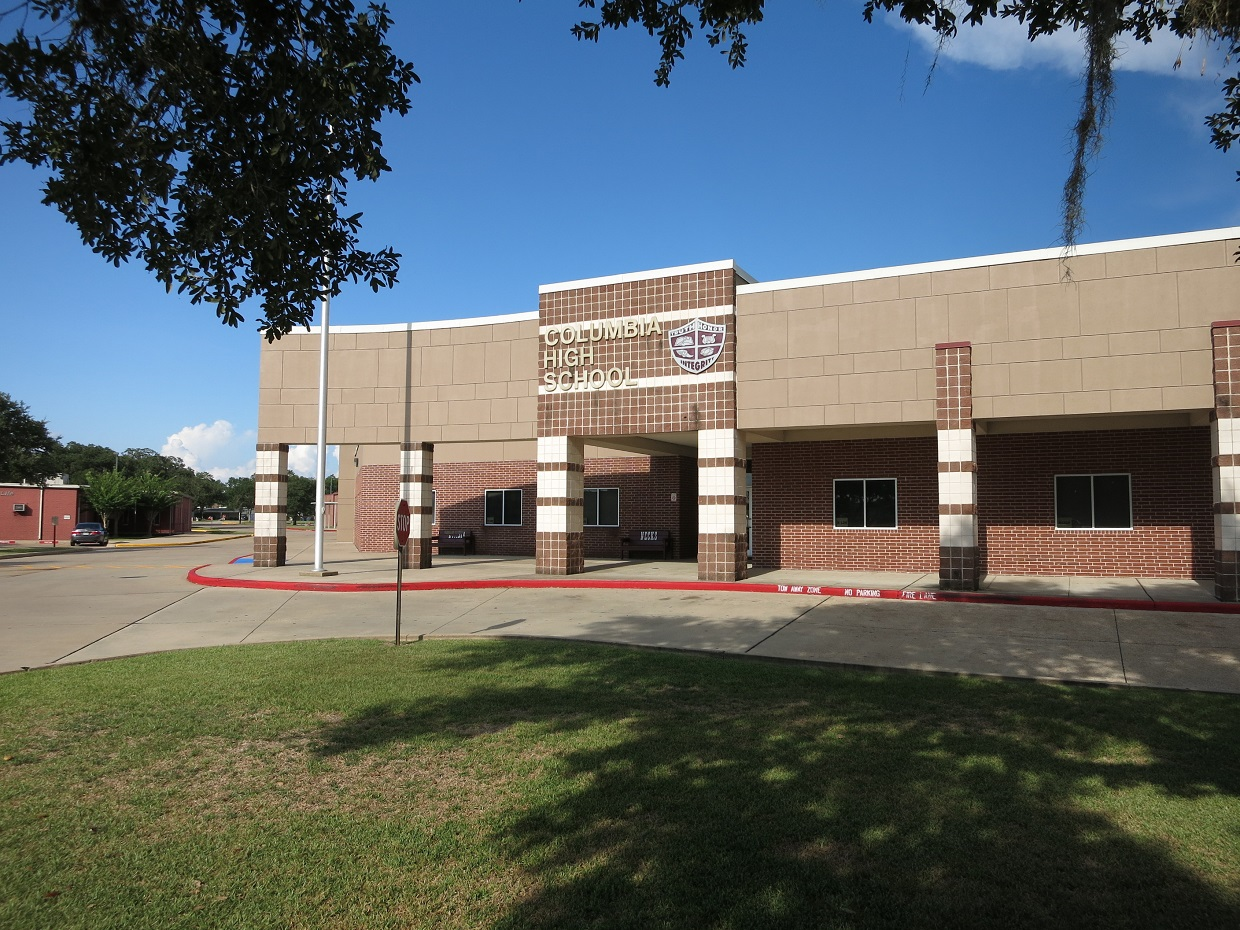
Columbia High School

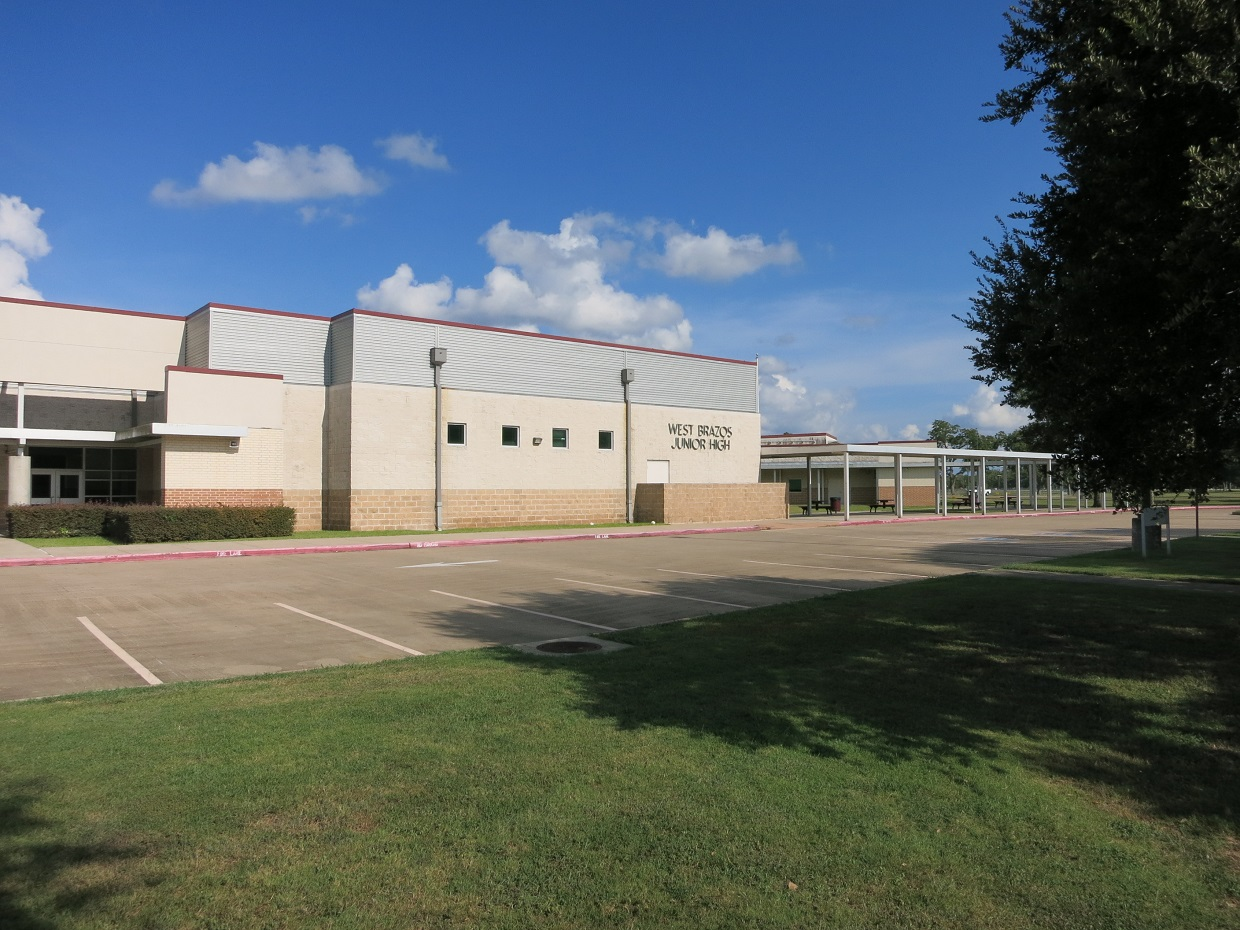
West Brazos Junior High School

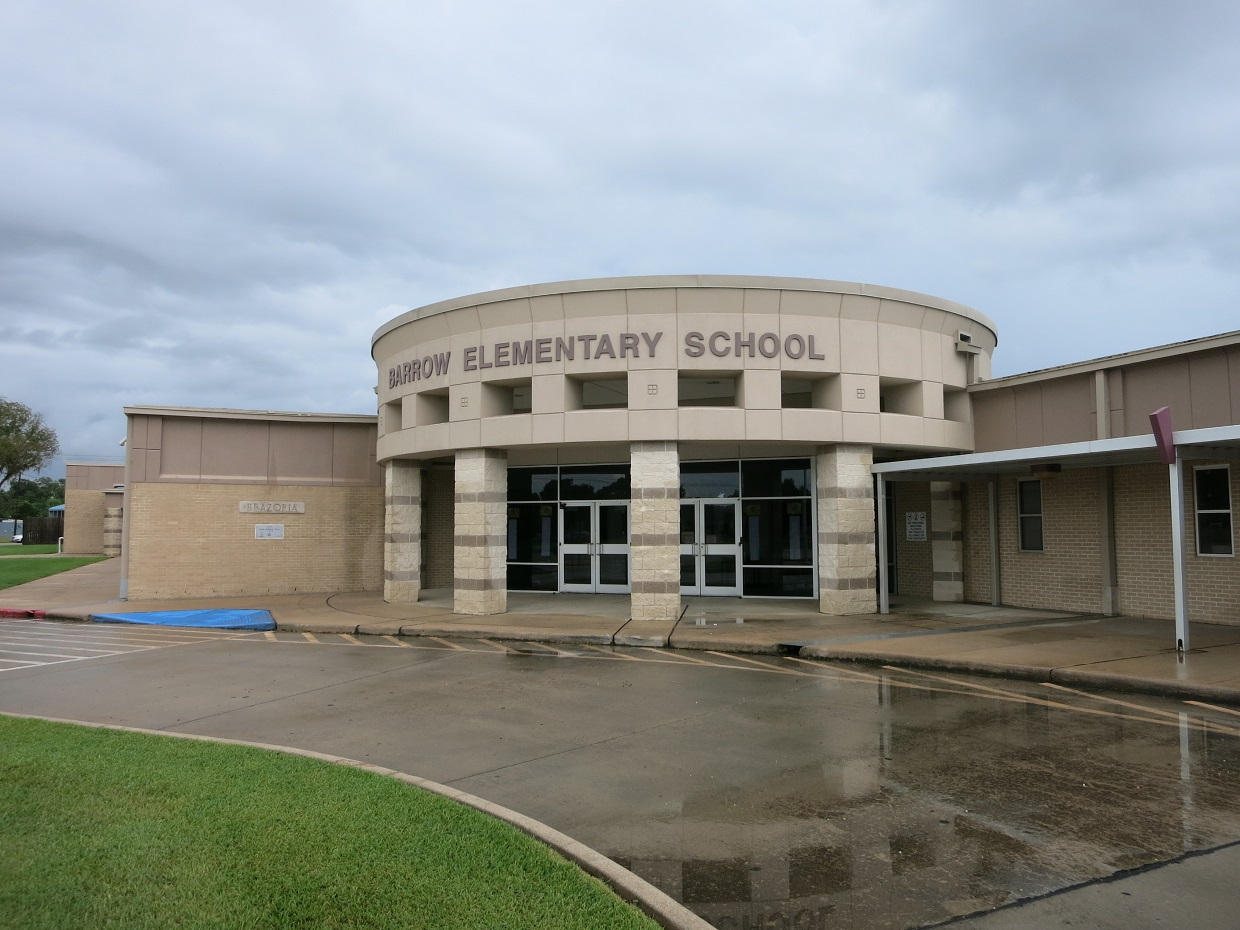
Barrow Elementary School

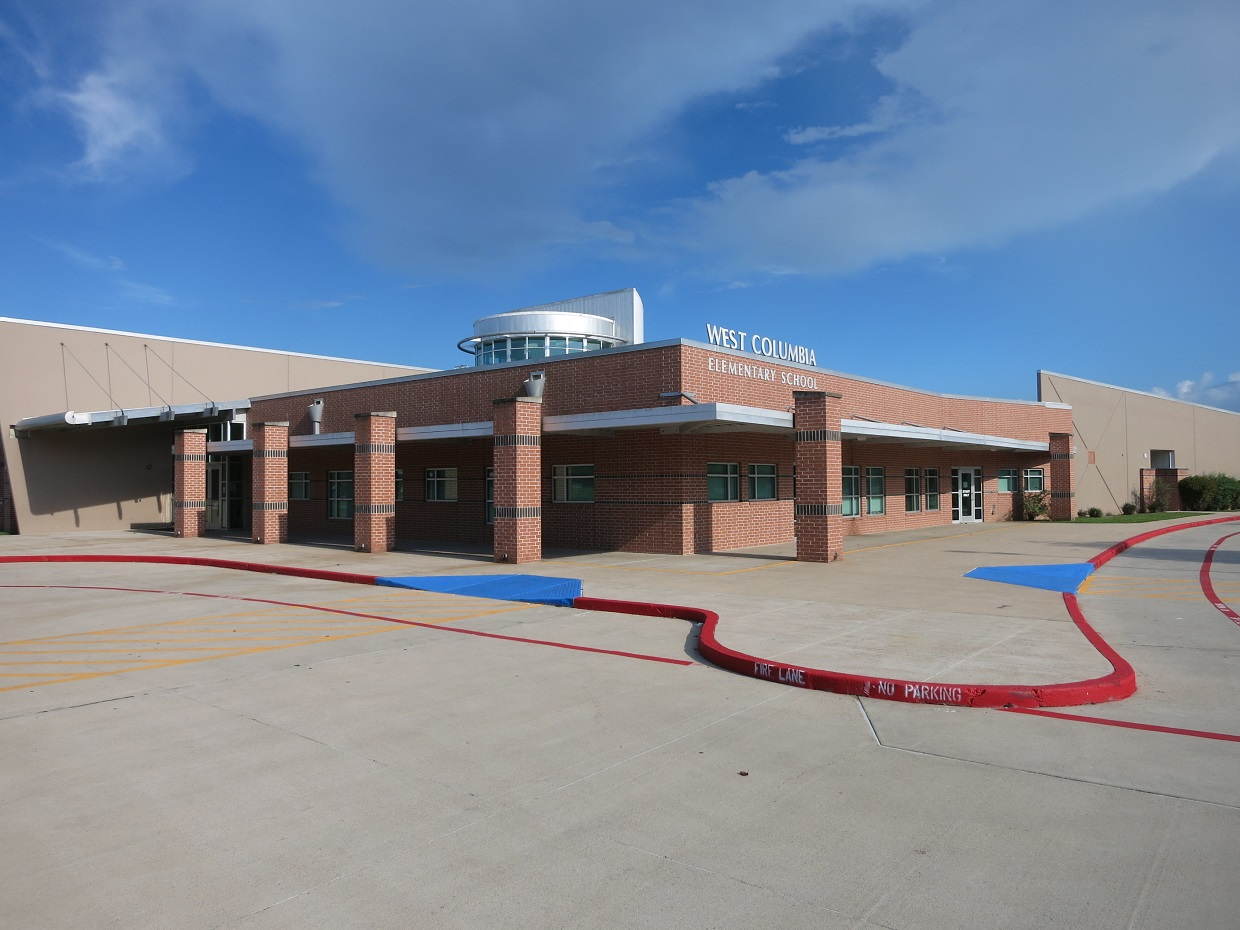
West Columbia Elementary School

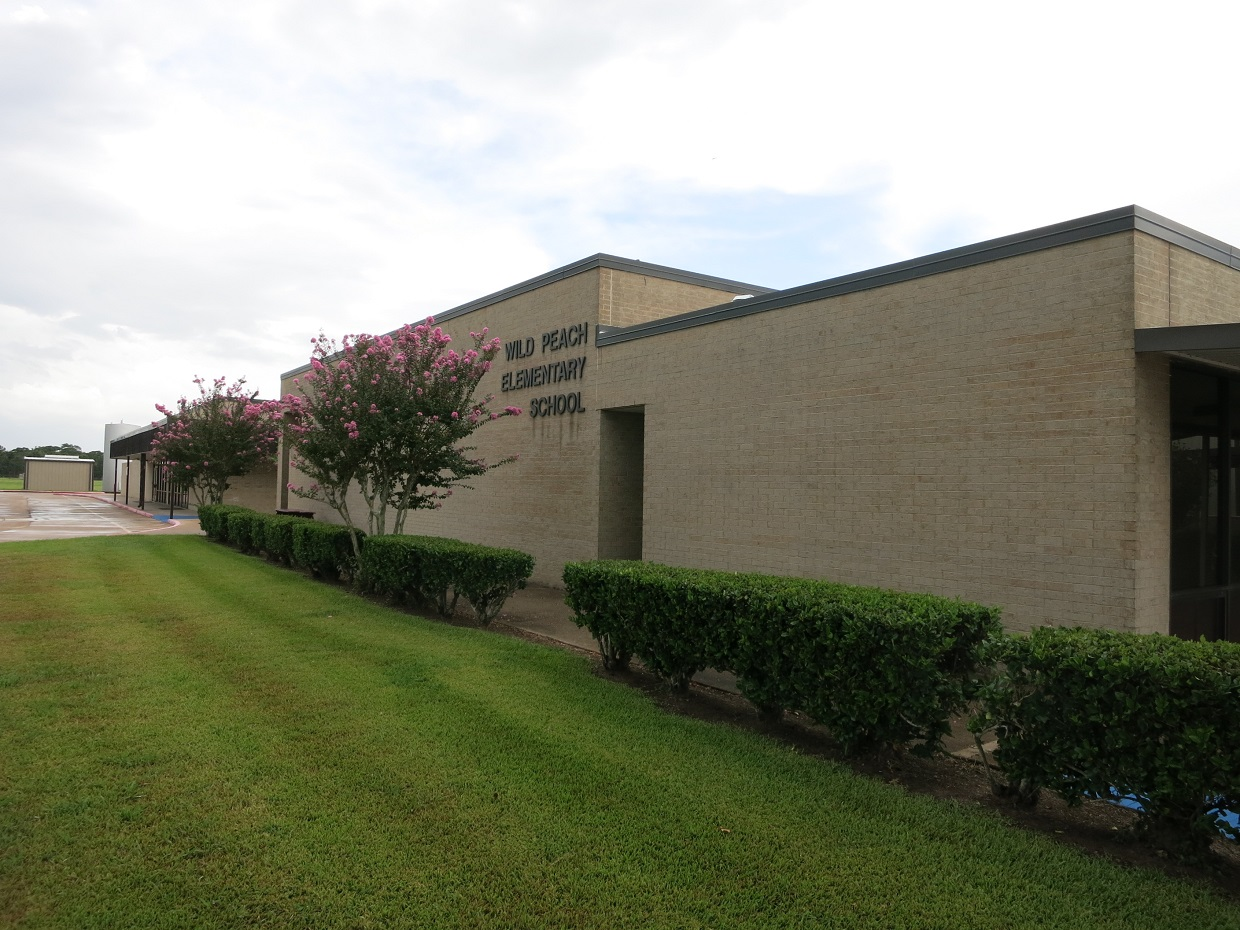
Wild Peach Elementary School
