= Columbia High School (Texas) =

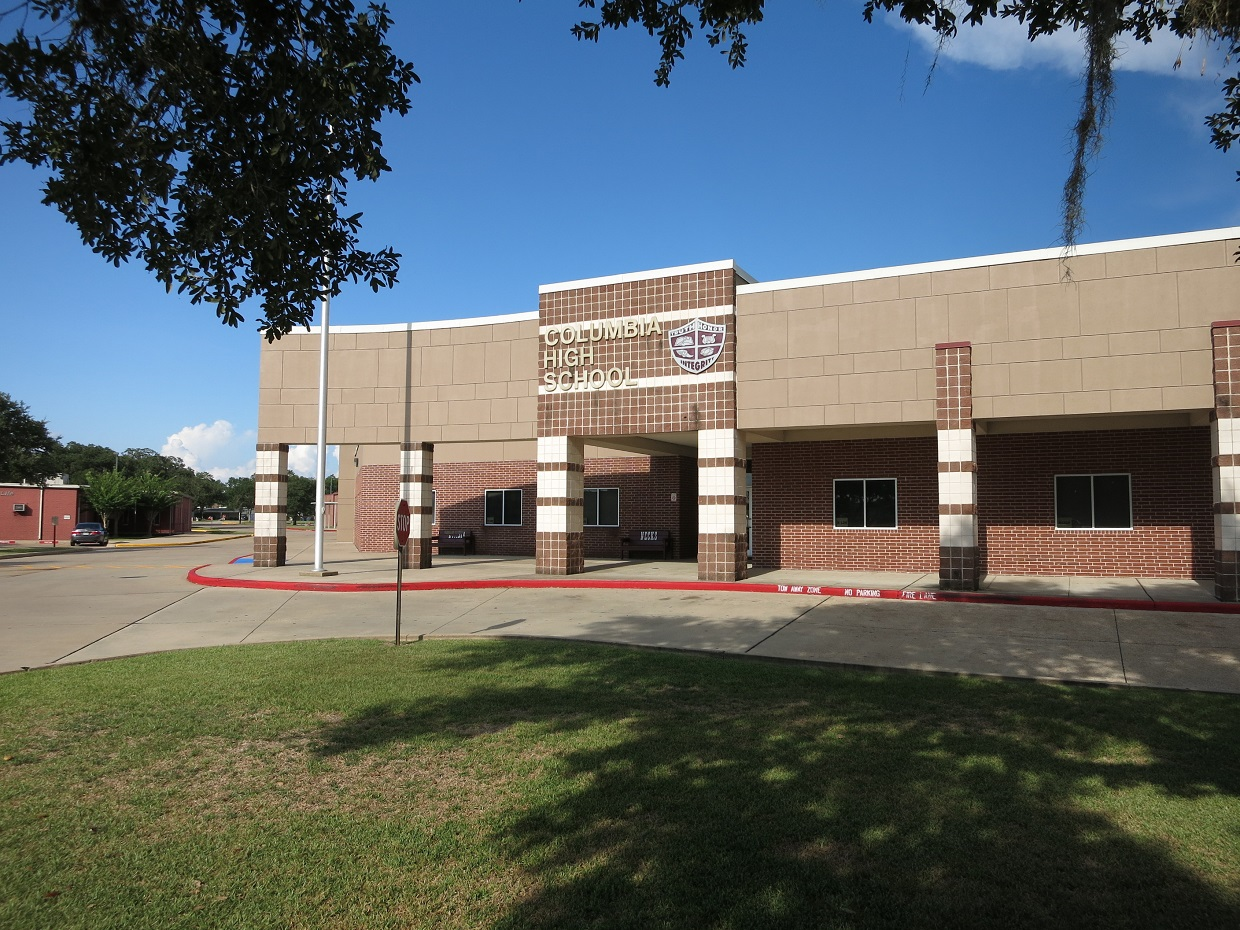
- Home Of The Fighting Roughnecks

Location
- 521 South 16th Street; West Columbia, Texas 77486; United States; 29.137733°N 95.651609°W

Information
- Type: Public
- School district: Columbia-Brazoria Independent School District
- Principal: Unspecified
- Teaching staff: 58.33 (FTE)
- Grades: 9–12
- Enrollment: 896 (2023-2024)
- Student to teacher ratio: 15.36
- Colors: Maroon & White
- Athletics conference: UIL Class AAAA
- Mascot: Roughnecks/Lady Necks
- Website: www.cbisd.com/o/chs

Columbia High School (West Columbia, Texas) is a public high school located in West Columbia, Texas, United States. It is classified as a 4A school by the University Interscholastic League (UIL). It is the only senior high school in Columbia-Brazoria Independent School District which is located in southwest Brazoria County. For the 2024-25 school year, the school was given a "C" by the Texas Education Agency.

== Athletics ==
The Columbia Roughnecks compete in the following sports:

- Baseball
- Basketball
- Cross Country
- Football
- Golf
- Powerlifting
- Soccer
- Softball
- Tennis
- Track and Field
- Volleyball

=== State titles ===
Columbia (UIL)

- Softball -
  - 2006(3A)
- Girls Track -
  - 1972(1A)

West Columbia Brown (PVIL)

- Boys Basketball -
  - 1948(PVIL-1A), 1950(PVIL-1A), 1952(PVIL-1A)

== Theatre ==
- One Act Play
  - 1948(1A)

== Notable alumni ==
- Jim Ray Smith (1950), former NFL All-Pro offensive lineman
- Dennis Gaubatz (1958), former NFL linebacker
- Charlie Davis (1970), former NFL running back
- Charlie Johnson (1970), former NFL All-Pro defesive tackle
- Jared Wells (1999), former MLB pitcher
- Seth Romero (2014), former MLB pitcher
- Cam Ward (2020), quarterback for the Tennessee Titans
