= West Columbia, Texas =

City in Brazoria County, Texas, United States

- City
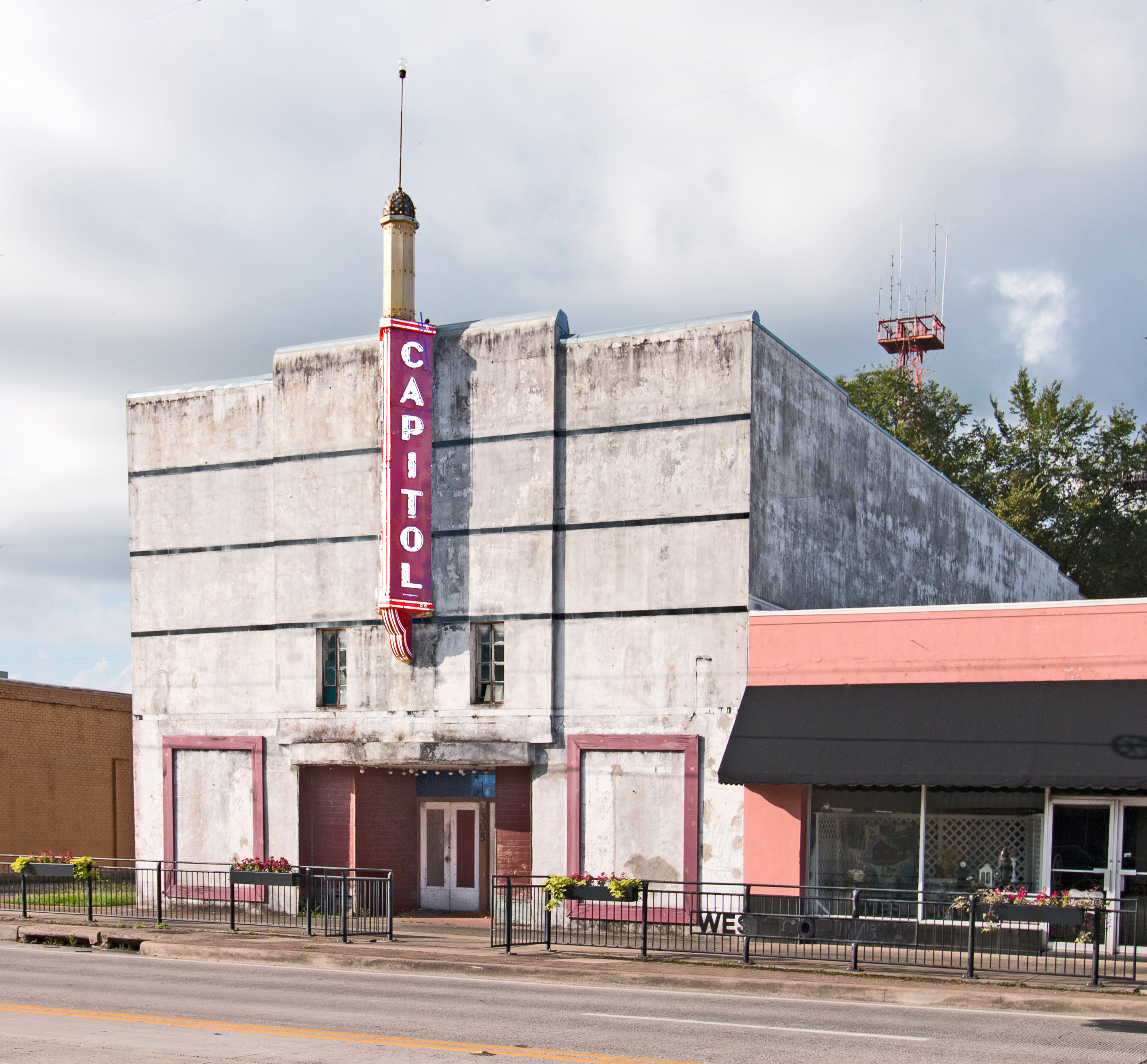
- Capitol Theater
- Motto: "Birthplace of a Republic"
- Location of West Columbia, Texas
- Coordinates: 29°8′29″N 95°38′49″W
- Country: United States
- State: Texas
- County: Brazoria

Government
  - Type: General Law Municipality
  - City Manager: Debbie Sutherland
  - Mayor: Laurie Beal Kincannon

Area
  - Total: 2.63 sq mi (6.80 km^{2})
  - Land: 2.61 sq mi (6.75 km^{2})
  - Water: 0.015 sq mi (0.04 km^{2})
- Elevation: 36 ft (11 m)

Population (2020)
  - Total: 3,644
  - Density: 1,468.6/sq mi (567.04/km^{2})
- Time zone: UTC-6 (Central (CST))
  - Summer (DST): UTC-5 (CDT)
- ZIP code: 77486
- Area code: 979
- FIPS code: 48-77416
- GNIS feature ID: 1371096
- Website: westcolumbiatx.org

West Columbia is a city in Brazoria County, Texas, United States. The city is centered on the intersection of Texas Highways 35 & 36, 55 miles (89 km) southwest of downtown Houston. The population was 3,644 at the 2020 census.

The 1st Congress of the Republic of Texas was convened in West Columbia on October 3, 1836. (It was then named simply Columbia.)

== Geography ==
West Columbia is located in western Brazoria County at 29°8′29″N 95°38′49″W (29.141513, –95.647016), about 2 miles (3 km) west of the Brazos River. Texas State Highway 35 leads east 13 miles (21 km) to Angleton, the county seat, and southwest 23 miles (37 km) to Bay City. Texas Highway 36 leads north 32 miles (51 km) to Rosenberg and southeast 23 miles (37 km) to Freeport on the Gulf of Mexico.

According to the United States Census Bureau, West Columbia has a total area of 2.6 square miles (6.7 km^{2}), of which 0.02 square miles (0.04 km^{2}), or 0.67%, is water.

== Demographics ==
Historical population
Census	Pop.	Note	%±
1940	1,573		—
1950	2,100		33.5%
1960	2,947		40.3%
1970	3,335		13.2%
1980	4,109		23.2%
1990	4,372		6.4%
2000	4,255		−2.7%
2010	3,905		−8.2%
2020	3,644		−6.7%
U.S. Decennial Census

=== 2020 census ===
As of the 2020 census, West Columbia had a population of 3,644 people, 1,433 households, and 984 families residing in the city.

The median age was 38.0 years. 23.6% of residents were under the age of 18 and 17.6% of residents were 65 years of age or older. For every 100 females there were 95.2 males, and for every 100 females age 18 and over there were 89.9 males.

96.3% of residents lived in urban areas, while 3.7% lived in rural areas.

There were 1,433 households in West Columbia, of which 33.8% had children under the age of 18 living in them. Of all households, 44.6% were married-couple households, 16.8% were households with a male householder and no spouse or partner present, and 32.7% were households with a female householder and no spouse or partner present. About 28.1% of all households were made up of individuals and 13.9% had someone living alone who was 65 years of age or older.

There were 1,684 housing units, of which 14.9% were vacant. The homeowner vacancy rate was 3.7% and the rental vacancy rate was 17.5%.

Racial composition as of the 2020 census
Race	Number	Percent
White	2,245	61.6%
Black or African American	575	15.8%
American Indian and Alaska Native	47	1.3%
Asian	19	0.5%
Native Hawaiian and Other Pacific Islander	0	0.0%
Some other race	356	9.8%
Two or more races	402	11.0%
Hispanic or Latino (of any race)	902	24.8%

=== 2000 census ===
As of the census of 2000, there were 4,255 people, 1,607 households, and 1,099 families residing in the city. The population density was 1,661.9 inhabitants per square mile (641.7/km^{2}). There were 1,755 housing units at an average density of 685.5 per square mile (264.7/km^{2}). The racial makeup of the city was 70.15% White, 19.51% African American, 0.40% Native American, 0.38% Asian, 0.02% Pacific Islander, 7.83% from other races, and 1.72% from two or more races. Hispanic or Latino of any race were 18.05% of the population.

There were 1,607 households, out of which 35.5% had children under the age of 18 living with them, 50.0% were married couples living together, 14.0% had a female householder with no husband present, and 31.6% were non-families. 27.6% of all households were made up of individuals, and 13.3% had someone living alone who was 65 years of age or older. The average household size was 2.60 and the average family size was 3.19.

In the city, the population was spread out, with 28.8% under the age of 18, 9.0% from 18 to 24, 27.3% from 25 to 44, 21.8% from 45 to 64, and 13.1% who were 65 years of age or older. The median age was 35 years. For every 100 females, there were 88.9 males. For every 100 females age 18 and over, there were 85.0 males.

The median income for a household in the city was $31,115, and the median income for a family was $38,090. Males had a median income of $37,981 versus $19,775 for females. The per capita income for the city was $15,647. About 14.0% of families and 20.0% of the population were below the poverty line, including 24.5% of those under age 18 and 14.3% of those age 65 or over.

== History ==
Columbia was established in 1826 by Josiah Hughes Bell when the town was laid out two miles west of Marion, later known as East Columbia. Columbia served as the capital of the Republic of Texas from September 1836 until the government relocated to Houston in April 1837. The town hosted the First Congress of the Republic of Texas, which convened on October 3, 1836; Sam Houston was inaugurated as president on October 22. The House of Representatives convened in a two-story frame house, while the Senate met in a smaller house. On November 30, 1836, Congress convened in joint session and chose to relocate the seat of government to Houston, citing Columbia’s inadequate accommodations for government personnel. President Houston ordered the move on December 15. On December 27, 1836, Secretary of State Stephen F. Austin died at the home of George B. McKinstry in Columbia.

After the Republic’s government left, commercial activity in the community (thereafter called West Columbia) fell sharply. A post office opened in 1905. Growth resumed after the large West Columbia oil field was discovered in 1918; the town then developed as a local center for rice and cotton farming, petroleum, and sulfur production. Population climbed to 2,500 by 1928 before dropping to roughly 1,000 during the Great Depression; by 1932 only forty businesses remained. By 1940 the town reported 1,573 residents and fifty businesses; numbers rose further to about 2,100 over the next ten years. During the 1960s major oil companies maintained producing wells nearby, and the surrounding area was said to hold the largest cattle herd in Texas. Census counts stood at 2,947 in 1960, 3,335 in 1970, and 4,372 in 1990. A replica of the first capitol was built in 1977, and the Varner-Hogg Plantation was later restored and operates today as a state historic site just outside the town.

In recent decades, the population has seen a modest decline to 4,255 in 2000, 3,905 in 2010, and 3,644 in 2020.

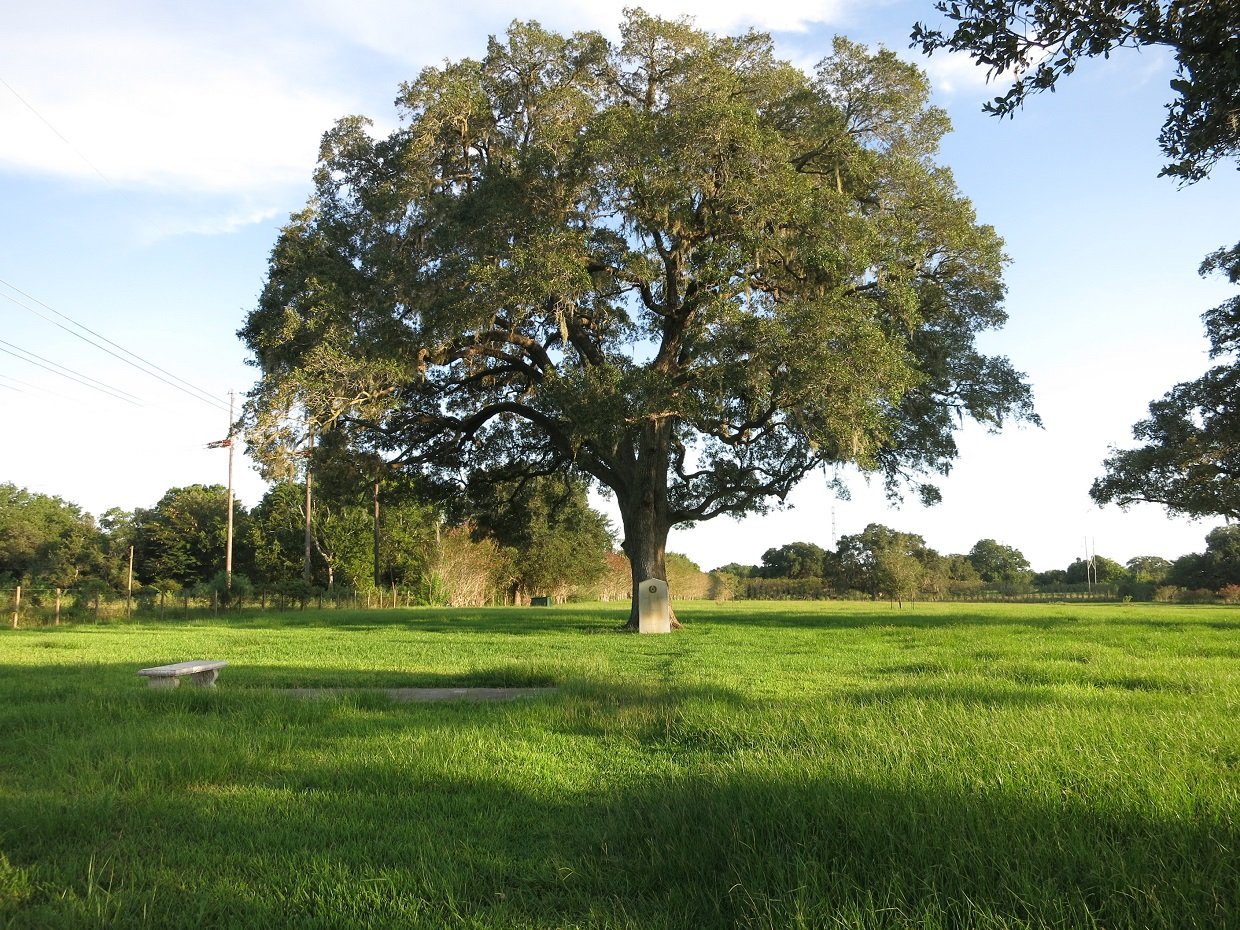
Stephen F. Austin death place on County 467

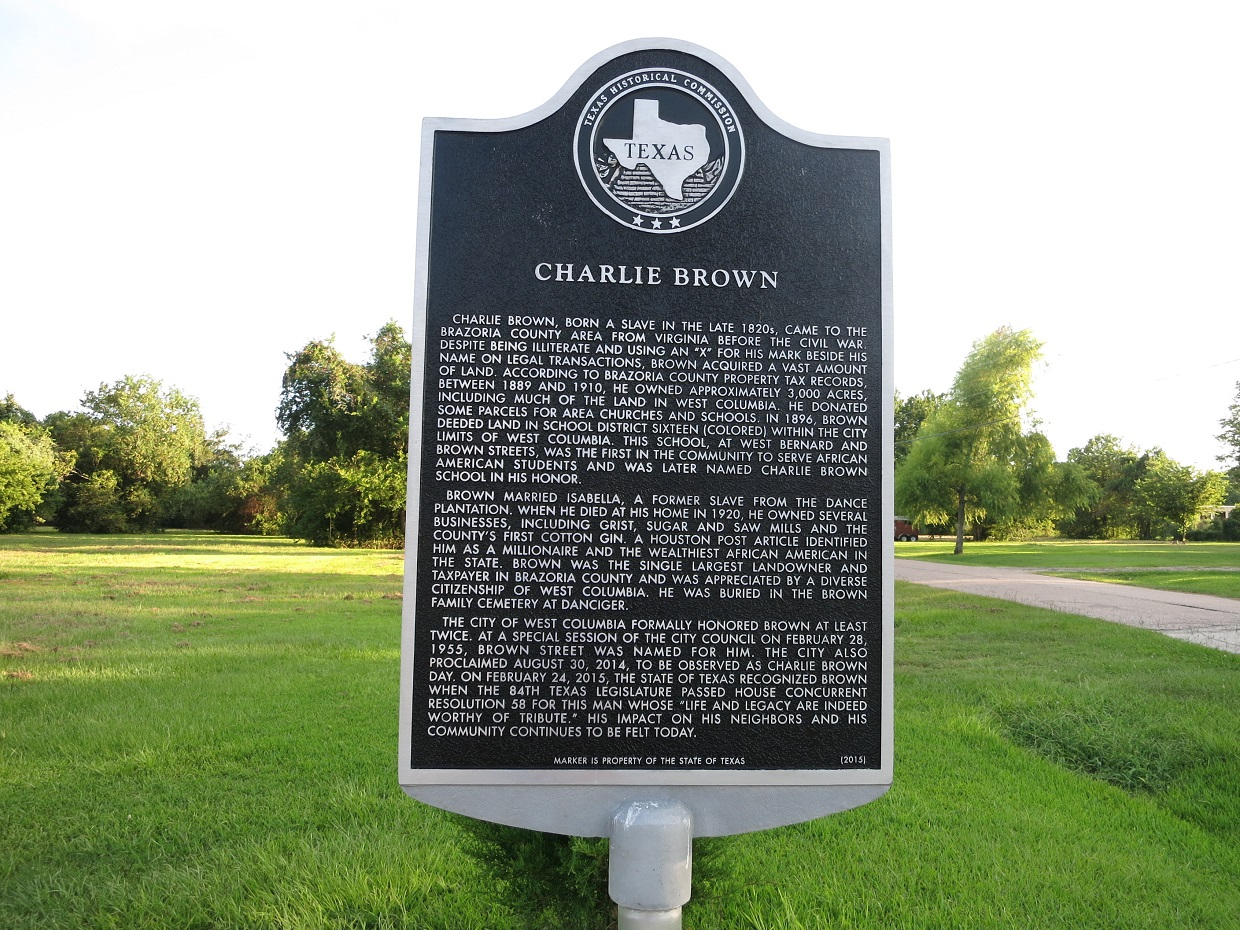
Charlie Brown state historic marker on Brazos Ave.

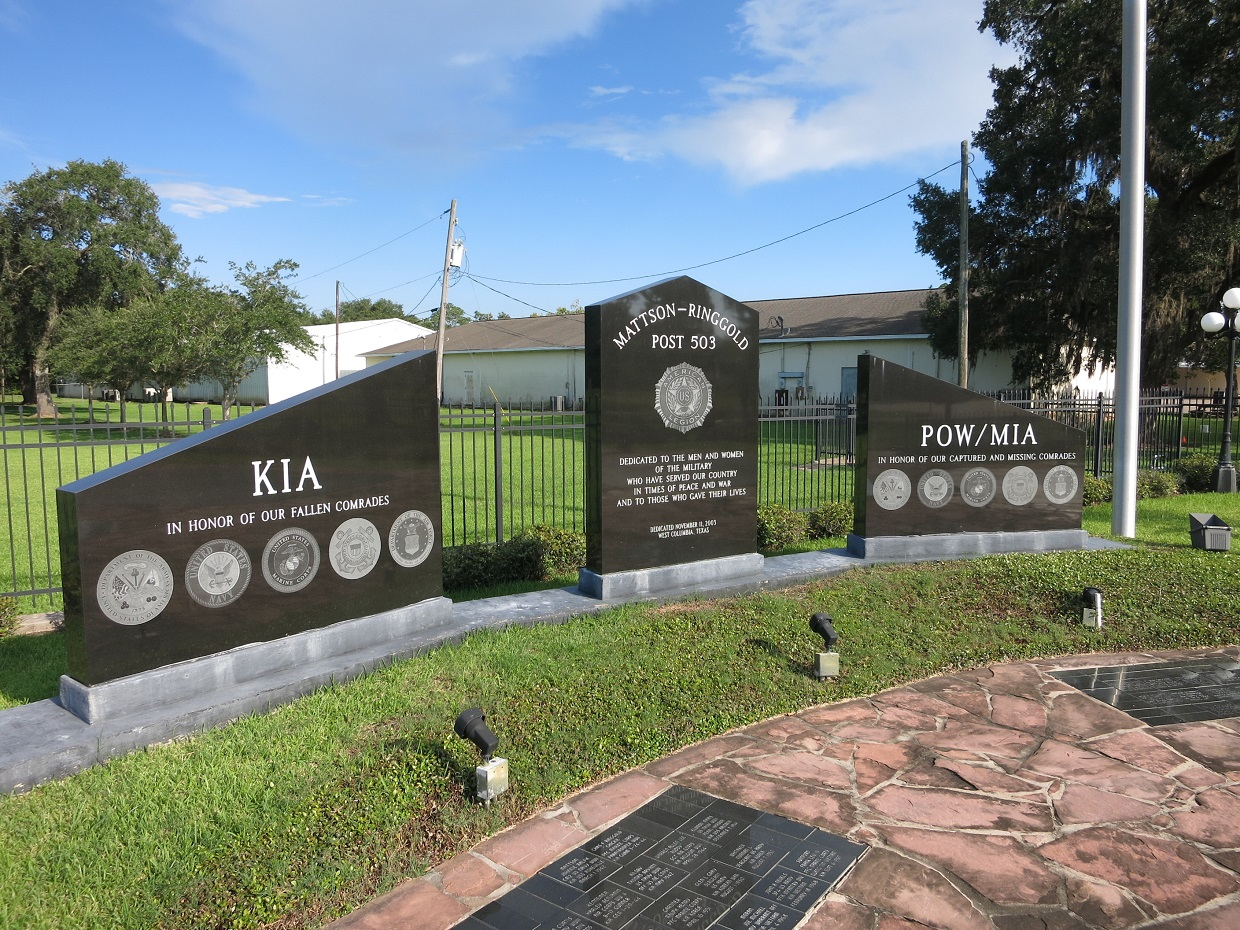
Veterans War Memorial at the American Legion Post

== Government and infrastructure ==
The United States Postal Service West Columbia Post Office is located at 350 West Brazos Avenue.

West Columbia is a general-law municipality, like approximately 75% of Texas cities. As a general-law municipality in Texas, West Columbia must operate according to specific state statutes prescribing powers and duties. Its local government is composed of five council members and a mayor, elected at-large to two-year terms in nonpartisan elections. The day-to-day operation of West Columbia falls to a full-time city manager.

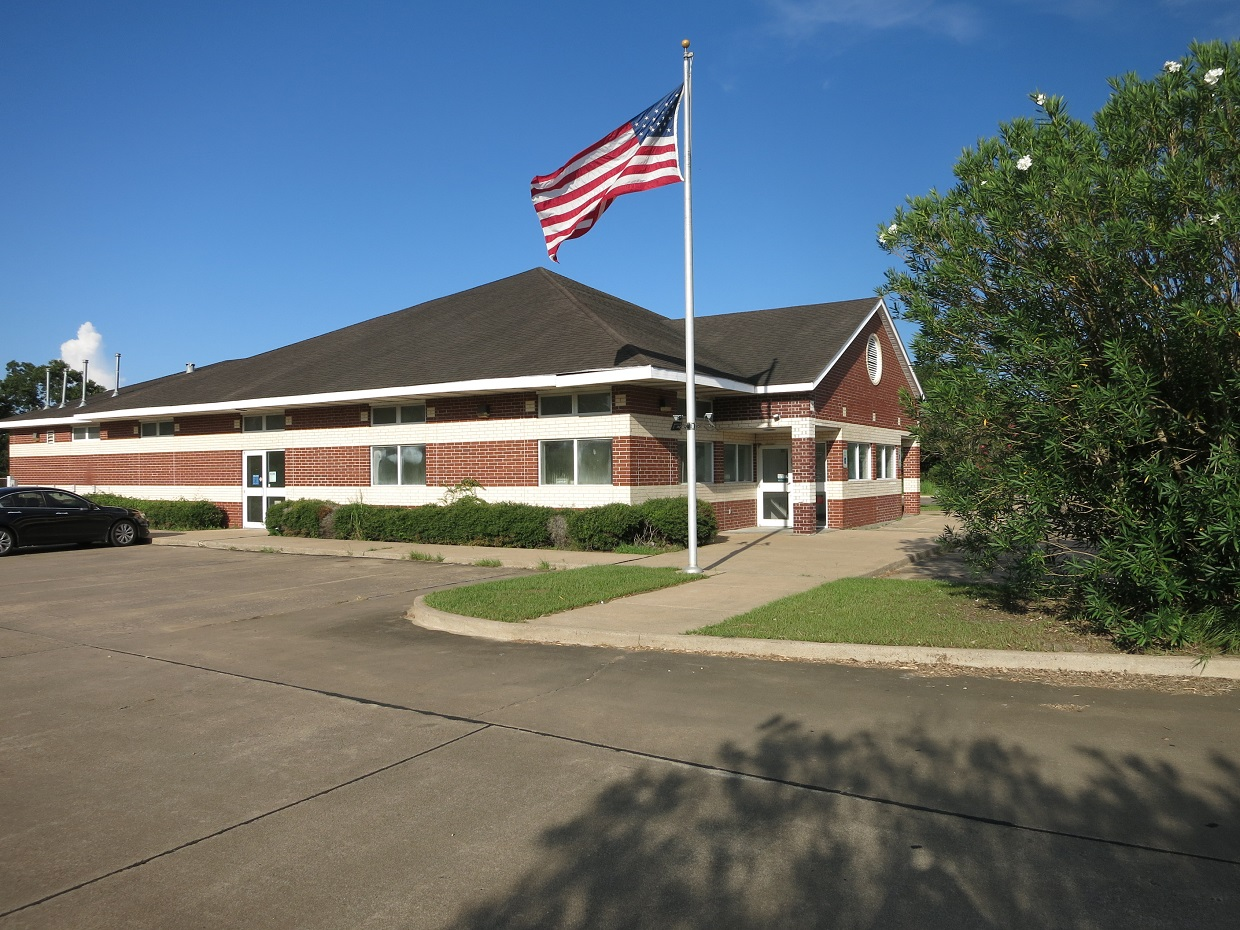
US Post Office at 350 W. Brazos Ave.

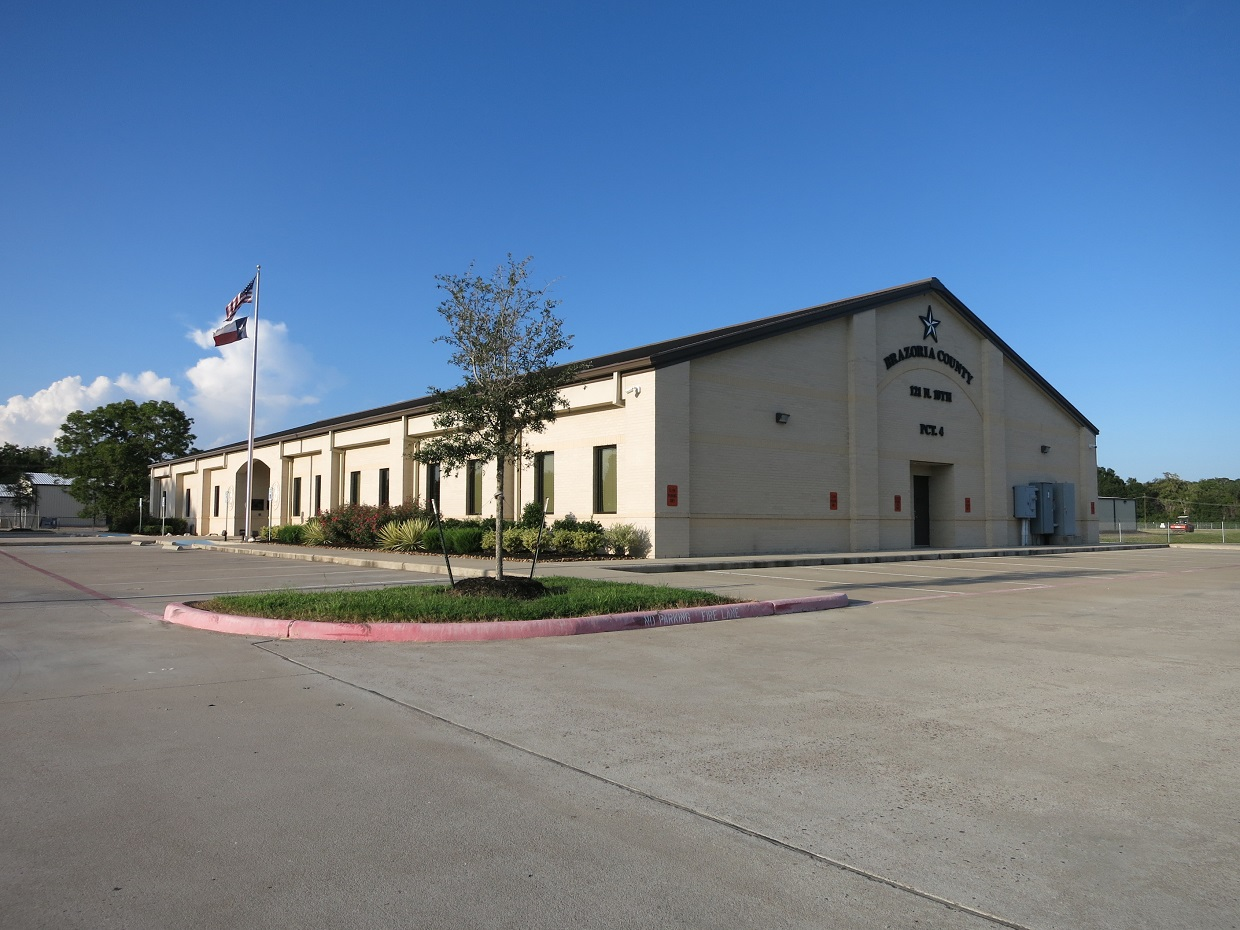
Brazoria Co. Precinct 4 building at 121 N. 10th St.

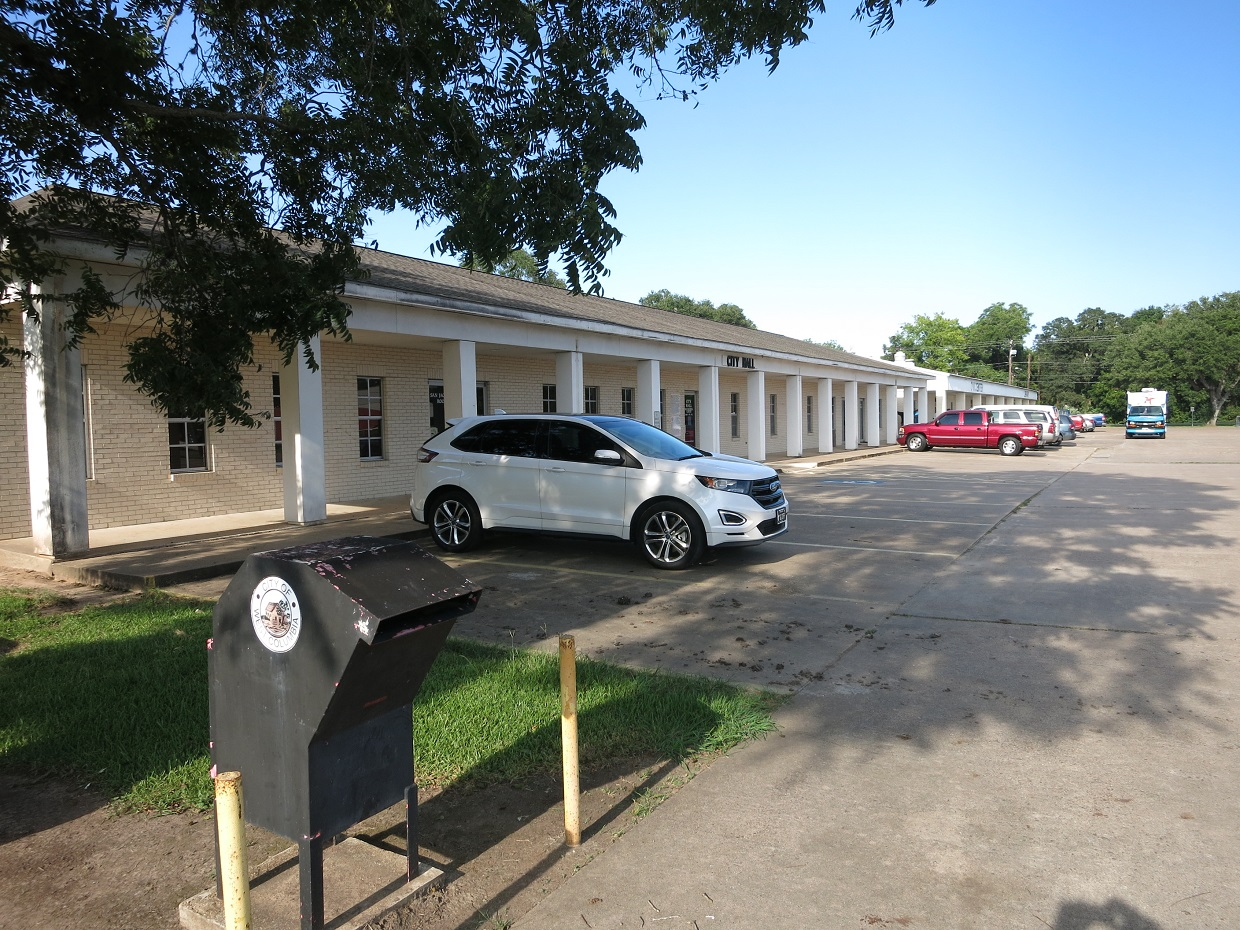
West Columbia City Hall at 512 E. Brazos Ave.

== Education ==
The city is served by the Columbia-Brazoria Independent School District.

Schools that serve the city include West Columbia Elementary School, Barrow Elementary School, Wild Peach Elementary School, West Brazos Junior High School, and Columbia High School. One elementary and the high school are in West Columbia. The junior high and Barrow Elementary are located in Brazoria.

There is a charter school called West Columbia Charter School.

The West Columbia Library is a part of the Brazoria County Library System.

The Texas Legislature assigned the area in Columbia-Brazoria ISD (including West Columbia) to the Brazosport College district.

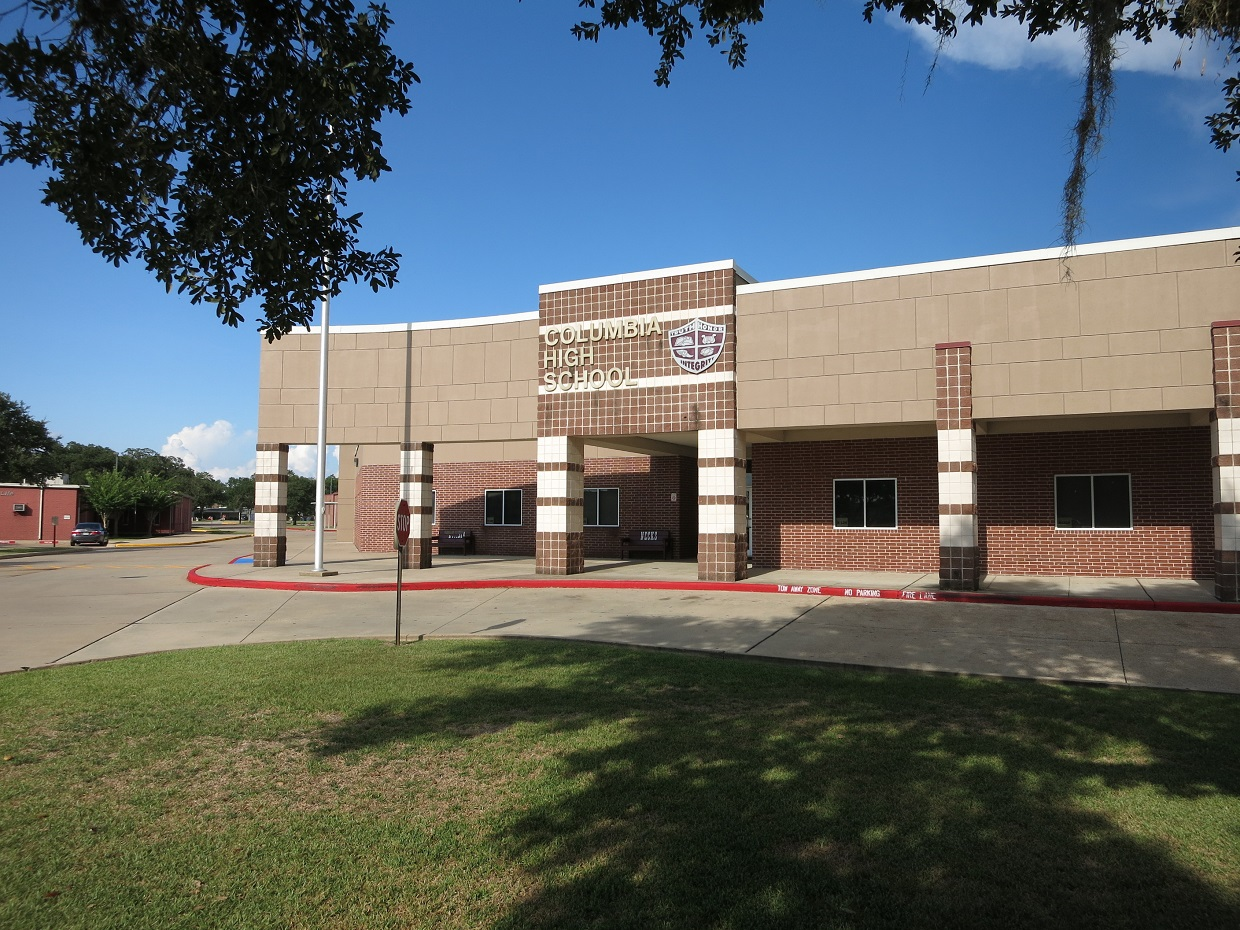
Columbia High School at 520 S. 16th St.

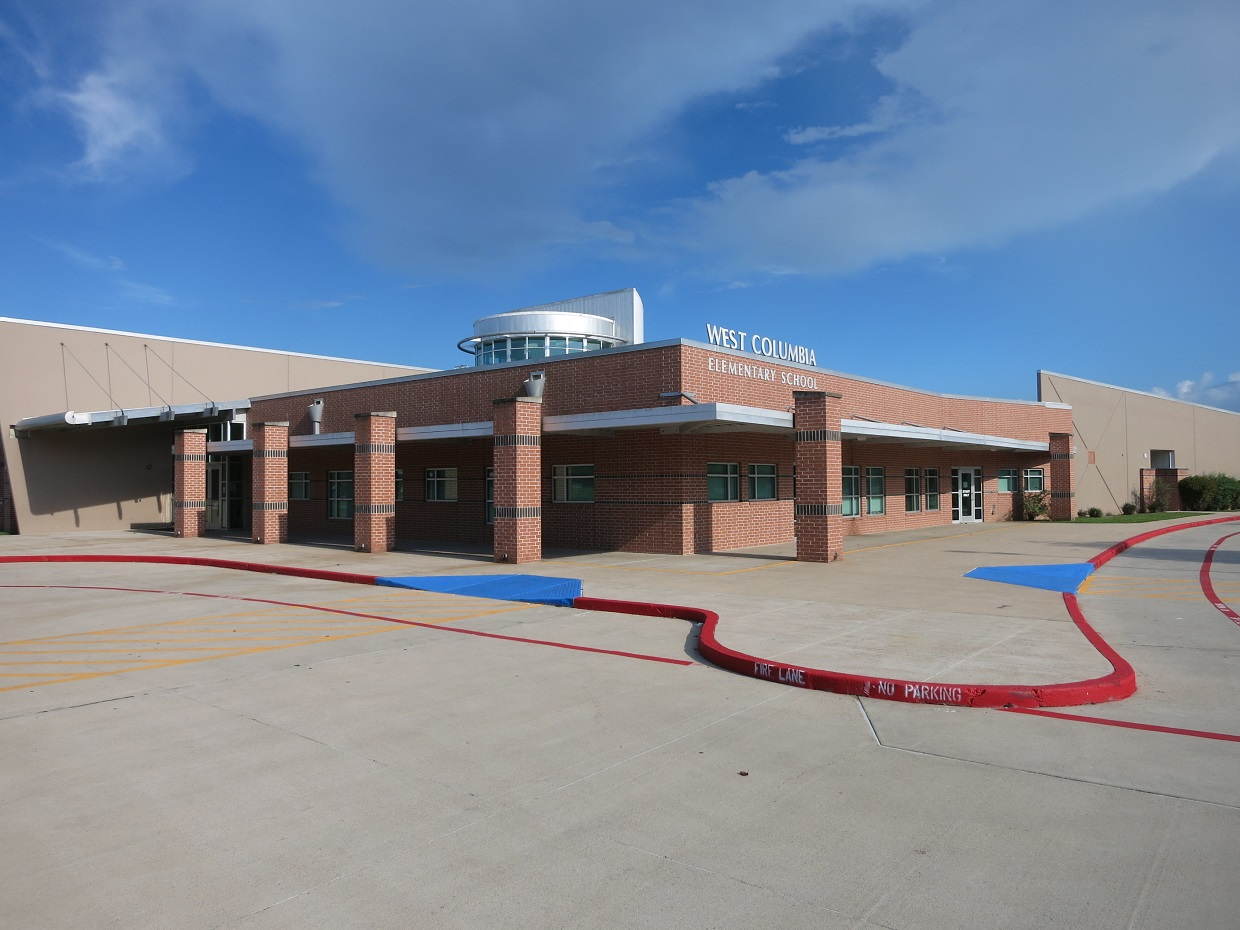
West Columbia Elementary School at 711 Gray St.

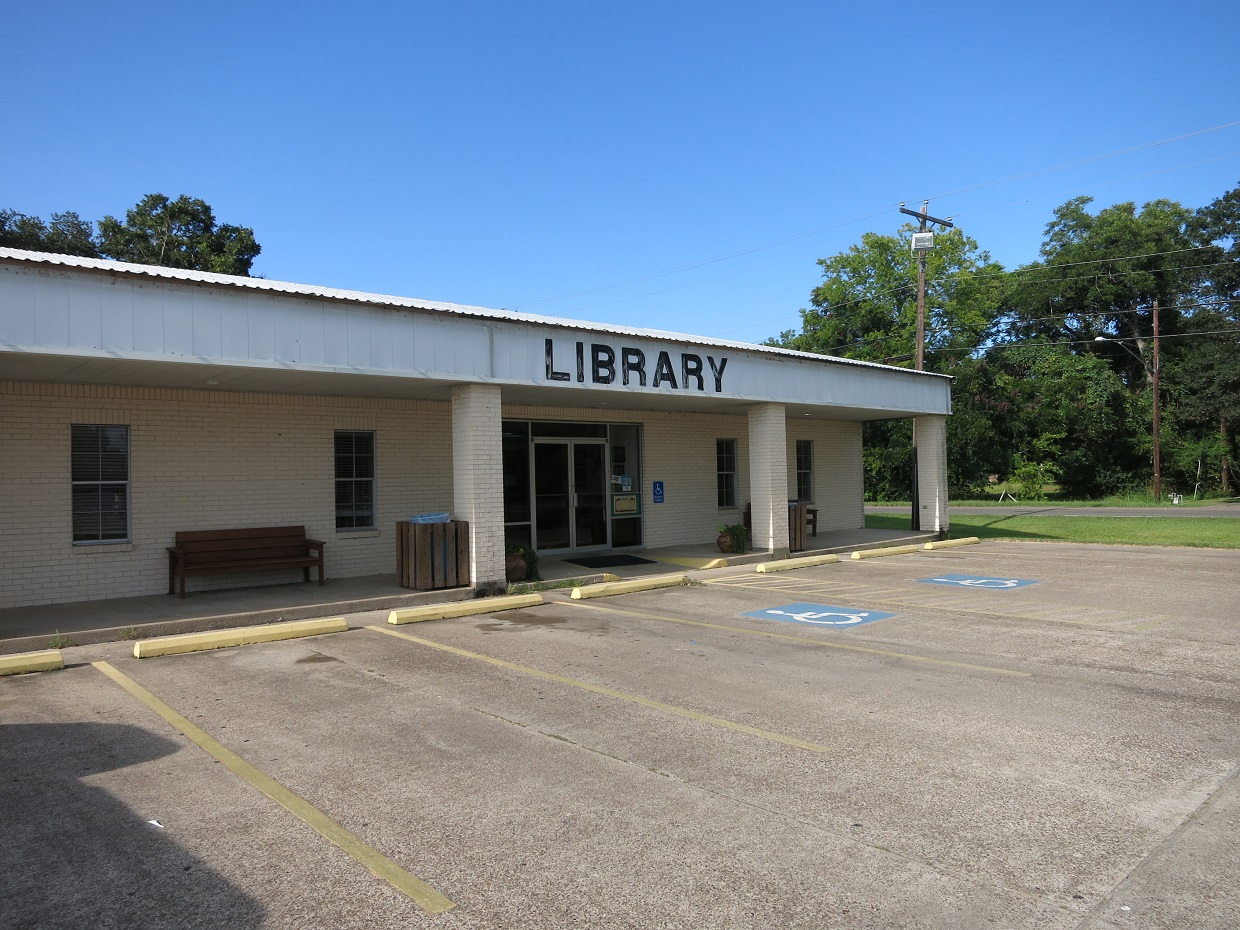
West Columbia Public Library at 518 E. Brazos Ave.

== Health services ==
West Columbia is the base of Central EMS. There is no hospital within the city limits. However, Sweeny Community Hospital, St. Luke's Health–Brazosport Hospital, UTMB Health Angleton Danbury Campus, and Matagorda Regional Medical Center are all within a 30-mile radius.

== See also ==
- List of municipalities in Texas
- Varner–Hogg Plantation State Historical Site
