= List of unsuccessful attacks related to schools =

This is a list of unsuccessful or foiled attacks related to schools.

== Foiled or exposed plots ==
Date	Location	Name	Description
November 12, 1965	Detroit, Michigan, United States	Unknown student	A 12-year-old boy was arrested in the parking lot of Roosevelt Elementary School while carrying a revolver. He had allegedly threatened to shoot his teacher for sending him home early.
October 12, 1992	Lincoln, Nebraska, United States	Arthur McElroy	A 43-year-old graduate student, Arthur McElroy, walked into an actuarial science class at the University of Nebraska–Lincoln and attempted to open fire on about 20 students with a .30-caliber M1 carbine. As students reacted by hitting the floor and pulling desks over their heads in anticipation, the gun jammed, and McElroy was apprehended. A court later found McElroy insane. He was taken to the Lincoln Regional Center's Forensic Mental Services unit in December 1992. In May 2015, a Lancaster County district judge announced plans for McElroy's release to a local nursing home after declaring McElroy to no longer be a threat to himself or others.
May 14, 1996	Brigham City, Utah, United States	Justin Allgood	15-year-old Justin Allgood of Brigham City boarded the Bingham Middle School Bus with a .357 Magnum and demanded the bus driver get off the bus. When she refused, he shot her in the leg, and then she got off. He went on a high-speed chase throughout the neighborhood with police before dying by a self-inflicted gunshot. The motivation was speculated to be over the loss of his close friends in a car accident before his attack.
November 16, 1998	Burlington, Wisconsin, United States	5 unknown	Five students were arrested the morning they were planning to attempt a mass school shooting at Burlington High School. Police were notified the previous week of the impending plot and met the Sunday before to plan the arrests. None of the guns were confiscated from the student's parents. Two of the students were held on prior convictions.
April 16, 1999	Notus, Idaho United States	Shawn Cooper	Shawn Cooper, 15, entered Notus Junior-Senior High School with a shotgun he wrapped in a blanket and carried from home on the school bus during a manic episode. He fired 2 shots that narrowly missed people before being detained.
May 1999	Port Huron, Michigan, United States	Unknown	A 12-year-old, 13-year-old, and two 14-year-olds, all boys, planned to hold up a gun store and then attack Holland Woods Middle School. Once there, they planned to rape some of the girls and shoot as many as 154 targets that they had drawn up on a list. They had stolen a building plan from the custodian's office but they were all caught within a day of a classmate's report to an assistant principal.
January 30, 2001	Cupertino, California, United States	Al DeGuzman	De Anza College student Al DeGuzman planned a Columbine-style school shooting at the school. An employee at a Longs Drugs store developed pictures of DeGuzman posing with his guns and homemade bombs. She and a coworker called the police. DeGuzman was arrested when he returned for his photos. Police searched DeGuzman's bedroom and found several shotguns and rifles, nearly 1000 rounds of ammunition, homemade bombs and a map of De Anza College, marked with locations where bombs would be placed. In October 2002, DeGuzman was sentenced to seven years in state prison. He later committed suicide by hanging himself in his jail cell on August 4, 2004.
February 14, 2001	Elmira, New York, United States	Jeremy Getman	Jeremy Getman, 18, planned a school attack at Southside High School, but it was foiled after students told a teacher that he was carrying weapons. He carried 14 pipe bombs, three smaller bombs, a propane tank, a sawed-off shotgun, and a .22 caliber pistol into the school by a duffel bag and also a book bag full of ammunition. On December 17, 2001, he was sentenced to 8½ years.
March 16, 2004	Malcolm, Nebraska, United States	Joshua Magee	17-year-old Joshua Magee was arrested in the parking lot of Malcolm High School after a school staff member, who saw the youth drinking liquor and putting on a black overcoat, called the police. A search of Magee's car produced a bolt-action rifle, 20 bombs, and a note stating that he wanted to injure everyone at the school except for three friends. Magee, to whom the school paid close attention after it was reported to faculty that he was experimenting with explosives at home, was charged with attempted murder.
March 14, 2006	Reno, Nevada, United States	James Newman	2006 Pine Middle School shooting occurred when 14-year-old James Newman entered Pine Middle School with a 38-caliber revolver and shot two students, but there were no fatalities. In an interview, Newman reported extensively researching Columbine High School massacre before his attack.
September 14, 2006	Green Bay, Wisconsin, United States	Shawn Ryan Sturtz and William Charles Cornell	Two 17-year-old boys were arrested on the morning of Sept. 14 at Green Bay East High School for allegedly planning an armed attack on their school. Authorities said they found suicide notes at the homes of both Shawn Ryan Sturtz and William Charles Cornell. The following items were also found at Cornell's home: handmade explosives; bbs; gunpowder; toilet paper tubes and firecrackers; six one-quart jars of napalm; nine long guns, including rifles and shotguns; one handgun; walkie-talkies; numerous pellet guns; hundreds of rounds of ammunition; and mannequin heads that may have been used for target practice. In total, 110 items were seized.
October 11, 2007	Plymouth Meeting, Pennsylvania, United States	Dillon Cossey	14-year-old Dillon Cossey was arrested at his home in Plymouth Meeting after a friend told police about his plan to carry out a Columbine-style attack on Plymouth Whitemarsh High School. After a police-conducted search of the Cossey residence, officers found a 9 mm Hi-Point carbine, which he named "Reb" in honor of Eric Harris, over 30 airsoft guns, a dozen knives and swords, seven homemade explosives, four which were live, a copy of The Anarchist Cookbook, and several movies about the Columbine High School Massacre, all which were in the boy's bedroom. A .22 rifle and a .22 pistol, which were lent to another acquaintance for safekeeping, were also recovered by authorities. However, no ammunition turned up in the search, so investigators have concluded that the threat of an attack was not imminent. Even on Cossey's MySpace page, he discussed his admiration for the bank robbers of the North Hollywood shootout as well as for Eric Harris and Dylan Klebold, the Columbine gunmen. In his trial, Cossey confessed that he was going to carry out his shooting to kill the people who had relentlessly bullied him in elementary and middle school. Bullying led his parents to pull him out of public school at the end of his 7th-grade year and home-school him. It was later found that he also had contact with Pekka-Eric Auvinen, the perpetrator of the Jokela school shooting, though Cossey did not know of Auvinen's plans. Cossey served time in juvenile detention and could have possibly stayed until the age of 21. His mother, Michelle Cossey, faced charges for purchasing the weapons and other charges regarding the welfare of her son.
June 4, 2008	Mishawaka, Indiana, United States	Russell Frantom	16-year-old Russell Frantom was arrested after a notebook retrieved from his locker at Penn High School stated, "I wanna break the current shooting record. I wanna get instant recognition." He and a 33-year-old possible accomplice, Lee Billi, were charged with conspiracy. Lee Billi was sentenced to 10 years in prison on March 26, 2009.
December 4, 2008	Pottstown, Pennsylvania, United States	Richard Yanis	15-year-old Richard Yanis was arrested for plotting a school shooting at Pottstown High School after his father reported to police three missing handguns. An investigation revealed that Yanis had stolen the guns from his father and put them into a duffel bag, which he handed to a friend with the words to "hold onto it". After checking the bag, Yanis' friend told his mother of the weapons, who then forced him to get rid of them by throwing them into a river. After his arrest, Yanis admitted that he had planned to shoot people at his school he didn't like, before committing suicide.
March 11, 2009	Drexel Hill, Pennsylvania, United States	Unknown	An eighth-grade student who attended St. Andrew School in Drexel Hill was arrested after a fellow pupil he attempted to recruit for an attack tipped off authorities. The suspect was then pulled from class and later arrested. Shortly after, two airsoft pistols were found in his backpack, one of them looking very much like a real gun. The 13-year-old student had planned to force the school into lockdown and shoot anybody who tried to escape. He is charged with terroristic threats and reckless endangerment and is currently held in juvenile detention. He is also charged with burglary for stealing $370 from another school in Drexel Hill on the previous weekend. It is noted that the suspect has a history of mental illness.
March 17, 2009	Attleborough, Norfolk, England	Unknown 16-year-old student	A 16-year-old student posted a threat on the website Newgrounds stating that he would go to Attleborough High School (currently named Attleborough Academy) with a gas canister, set fire to the building and commit other acts of violence. A Newgrounds user from Montreal, Quebec, Canada notified English authorities via Skype after seeing the threat. The student was found carrying a knife, matches, and a plastic gas canister containing flammable liquid, and was arrested for threats to commit criminal damage and possession of an offensive weapon, to which he admitted. He was then held under the Mental Health Act.
October 21, 2009	Monroe, New York, United States	Unknown 15-year-old	A 15-year-old boy from Monroe was already on juvenile probation when he broke down crying as he admitted he stockpiled bottles of gasoline, makeshift fuses, a torch, a 2-foot (0.61 m) machete, and three tanks of propane in a plot to attack former fellow students at Monroe-Woodbury High School.
November 17, 2009	Beauvais, France	Unknown 13-year-old	A 13-year-old boy, who was said to have had difficulties at his school, was arrested in Beauvais, accused of having planned to shoot his teachers. His parents had called the police after they found their son acting strangely and a gun missing. When the boy, armed with a hunting rifle and 25 cartridges, arrived at the school, it was already surrounded by police, so he dropped his plans, left the rifle in a field, and went to an Internet café in the city. That day, a parent-teacher meeting was scheduled to discuss his future at the school, and it was suspected that he wanted to prevent this meeting from taking place. He also wrote in a blog the evening before that this was the last day of his life. The 13-year-old was later taken into custody and later hospitalized for psychiatric evaluation.
February 23, 2010	Littleton, Colorado, United States	Bruco Eastwood	Bruco Eastwood entered Deer Creek Middle School and shot two children before being disarmed by a teacher.
October 8, 2010	Carlsbad, California, United States	Brendan O'Rourke	Brendan O'Rourke wandered into Kelly Elementary School and shot at two children before being apprehended by nearby construction workers.
July 7, 2011	Muar, Johor, Malaysia	Lau Hui Chung	40-year-old Lau Hui Chung, who had a history of drug addiction and mental illness, held hostages of 30 preschool children aged between 2 and 6 years old and four teachers of a kindergarten before being shot to death by police in July 2011 Muar kindergarten hostage crisis.
August 17, 2011	Tampa, Florida, United States	Jared Cano	17-year-old former student of Freedom High School Jared Cano was arrested for a bomb plot and shooting against his school in an attempt to outdo the Columbine massacre. He left behind bomb materials, a video, and a manifesto. He had been expelled from the school in March 2010. He was sentenced to 15 years in prison.
March 30, 2012	Orivesi, Finland	23-year-old male	A 23-year-old man fired two shots with a flare gun, hitting his ex-girlfriend's father in the arm in an office building. After the incident, he left and drove to Orivesi High School, took his rifle, and went to the third floor, apparently after his ex-girlfriend. He then knocked on the door to the classroom and tried to shoot the teacher who opened the door, but the gunman's rifle didn't fire and the teacher was able to shut the door. The gunman then fired four rounds through the door but did not hit anyone. He was apprehended by police outside the school and the gunman dropped his rifle.
May 7, 2012	Adelaide, Australia	Unknown student	A year 8 student at Modbury High School brought a revolver onto school grounds and began firing. No one was killed or injured. He and his father were charged with possessing an unregistered, loaded firearm, possessing an unlicensed firearm and unsecured ammunition. The student was banned from school for 10 weeks due to the incident.
March 24, 2013	Sojwe, Botswana	Unknown student	After he was expelled for jumping a fence, a student took a shotgun to Matsheng Community Junior School and opened fire. He allegedly intended to hit the school administration. He misfired, and when confronted by police, was arrested. There were no casualties.
May 27, 2013	Albany, Oregon, United States	Grant Acord	Grant Acord, a 17-year-old junior who was attending West Albany High School, was found with an arsenal of explosives under the floorboards of his bedrooms. The explosives included a Molotov cocktail, a napalm bomb, and Drano bombs. He supposedly wanted to make a more "successful version" of the Columbine High School massacre. He was charged with attempted aggravated murder and six counts each of unlawful possession and manufacture of a destructive device. He is held on $2 million bail.
July 3, 2013	Seattle, Washington, United States	Justin M. Jasper	Justin M. Jasper was arrested by University of Washington police after being found in a stolen truck on campus. Inside the truck police found a stolen rifle fitted with a scope, a stolen shotgun, body armor, knives, a machete, and six incendiary devices. Jasper also had maps to three local campuses, the University of Washington, South Seattle Community College, and Seattle University, in addition to anti-government literature and documents about the Syrian and Brazilian revolutions. Jasper had posted a podcast a few days before his arrest that indicated Jasper had anti-government views and was planning something in the western United States in support of the Brazilian revolution. He was charged in federal court with several felonies, had his bail set at US$2 million and in March 2014 was sentenced to three years in federal prison.
December 20, 2013	Trinidad, Colorado, United States	Unknown 15-year-old and 16-year-old	Two boys, 15 and 16, were arrested for planning an attack on Trinidad High School at the start of the new year. They had been planning the attack for up to six weeks. The 15-year-old reportedly idolized the Columbine High School and Aurora, Colorado, movie theater shooters.
January 14, 2014	Roswell, New Mexico, United States	Mason Campbell	12-year-old Mason Campbell entered Berrendo Middle School with a sawed-off shotgun and wounded 2, but there were no fatalities. After his arrest, a journal was found that reads "Hi everyone. If you're reading this, I'm probably in jail," it read. "Don't worry. I did what I wanted to do ... I grabbed a 20 gauge shotgun and heavy-duty saw. I chopped the stock off. Tomorrow will be fun."
March 2014	Helsinki, Finland	Josef Andrei Hannu, Nita-Minttu Tirkkonen	2014 Helsinki University massacre plan: Two people plotted to kill up to 50 victims at the University of Helsinki with firearms and poison gas. A third person who was invited to take part revealed the attack plan to a friend, who subsequently alerted the police. Both perpetrators were arrested and imprisoned for three years.
March 2014	Leicestershire, England	Michael Piggin	17-year-old Michael Piggin was arrested after planning to attack his former school and other areas, including a cinema and a mosque. He detailed his plans in a notebook and stockpiled homemade bombs, bomb-making materials, and various weapons. He also filmed a video of him throwing a Molotov cocktail.
March 4, 2014	Danbury, Connecticut, United States	Natalie Carpenter and Peter Thulin	18-year-old Natalie Carpenter and 19-year-old Peter Thulin were arrested on March 4 and accused of planning a shooting at Danbury High School. Carpenter was reportedly obsessed with the Columbine High School massacre.
May 1, 2014	Waseca, Minnesota, United States	John Davis LaDue	17-year-old John David LaDue was charged on May 1 with ten attempted murder and explosives counts. He had plotted to shoot his family and then kill himself and "as many students as he could" by blowing up Waseca Junior/Senior High School, according to authorities. Explosives and materials used to create explosives were found in his possession. LaDue reportedly idolized the Columbine High School massacre shooters.
May 14, 2014	Kaohsiung, Taiwan	Hong Juncheng	38 year-old Hong Juncheng (洪俊誠) demanded his sixth-grade teacher Zheng Shuhui (鄭淑惠) at her home a reparation of 30 million new Taiwan dollars (about US$1 million) for having beat and scolded him at school from March to May 1988, or her family would be killed, but neither the reparation nor the vowed murder happened. The Taiwan Kaohsiung District Court on May 28, 2015 sentenced him to three months in prison for attempted extortion. On August 5, 2015, The Taiwan High Court Kaohsiung Branch Court rejected his appeal for probation.
August 19, 2014	South Pasadena, California, United States	Unknown 16-year-old and 17-year-old	Two teenaged students at South Pasadena High School were arrested after they had confided in a third student their intentions to commit a school shooting, before threatening the student to not tell anyone. Despite a search of the two teen's residence, no weaponry of any kind was discovered. The two were sentenced to probation after pleading guilty to charges of conspiracy to commit murder in 2015.
November 3, 2014	Newcastle upon Tyne, England	Liam Lyburd	18-year-old Liam Lyburd was arrested at his home after posting online about a plot to commit mass murder at Newcastle College. Police found a Glock 19 handgun, 94 hollow point bullets, pipe bombs, a machete and a balaclava and boiler suit in a bag in his room. Police searched his computer and found out he had bought the weapons via the deep web and had written a manifesto, which he tried to delete, where he claimed the attack was revenge for getting expelled in 2012, had expressed admiration for Anders Behring Breivik and Jaylen Fryberg and had taken pictures of himself posing with weapons. He was later sentenced to life in prison with a minimum of 8 years. However, in 2017, his garden was searched after he wrote a letter from prison to the new owner of the house claiming that weapons could still be buried there. Lyburd would later be trialed again in 2021 whilst incarcerated for up to 7 instances of the possession of improvised weaponry, and 3 instances of assulting other inmates and staff between September 2020 and March 2021.
December 1, 2014	Plain City, Utah, United States	Unknown	A 16-year-old at Fremont High School was arrested after a student informed a school resources officer they saw the student had a gun in his waistband. The student was arrested without incident and confessed his intentions to kill a girl with whom he had a prior relationship, and then "open fire" on fellow students at the school.
December 9, 2015	Highlands Ranch, Colorado, United States	Brooke Higgins and Sienna Johnson	Two 16-year-old females at Mountain Vista High School were arrested and charged with plotting to carry out a school shooting on the last day of classes. The two were arrested after an anonymous tip was submitted to the school. Upon a search of their homes, Higgins was charged after her journal detailing her desire and plot to kill was discovered.
September 11, 2016	Cedar Rapids, Iowa, United States	Carter Boyles	A fifteen-year-old boy named Carter Boyles entered Cedar Rapids High School, where shots were heard and Carter was found dead outside the auditorium with a self-inflicted gunshot wound to the head. No one else was injured. He was associated with a YouTube channel called Bob8466 where he uploaded content about school shootings.
November 2016	Kokkola, Finland	21-year-old female female	A 21-year-old female, whose name was not released to the public, was charged with attempting to carry out a shooting at her former school. She admitted to planning the attack for the last 2 years and hoped to kill at least 40 random people. While acquiring more weapons, authorities recovered pistols, assault rifles, sawed-off shotguns, hand grenades and pepper spray in her home.
June 13, 2017	Nuneaton, England	Unknown 15-year-old student	A 15-year-old armed with a shotgun and 200 rounds of ammunition entered Higham Lane School. The student changed his mind before opening fire and called emergency services, surrendering to police at the scene.
August 3, 2017	La Plata, Argentina	Lara Tolosa Chanetón	On August 3, 2017, 15-year-old Lara Tolosa, a female student of the school, carried a .38 caliber revolver and committed suicide in the early morning hours in one of the classrooms, apparently due to the bullying she received from her classmates. In an anonymous forum called Voxed, she had said that although her main intention was suicide, she would also consider "killing 3 or 4 colleagues". There were no other casualties.
October 9, 2017	Ramos Mejía, Argentina	T.L.	A 14-year-old student, identified with the initials T.L., went to the establishment with a handgun and a pistol, a hunting knife, and dozens of ammunition, and would later be arrested after being discovered.
February 2018	Fair Haven, Vermont, United States	Jack Sawyer	The 18-year-old, Jack Sawyer, of Poultney, Vermont, was arrested after making threats to shoot up Fair Haven Union High School. Police searched his car and found a journal titled "Diary of an Active Shooter" and a shotgun with ammunition. During his interrogation, Sawyer shared his desire to reach the highest death count for a school shooter. Due to a flaw in Vermont's laws, planning a shooting is not the same as committing one, meaning his felony charges were dropped even after his full confession.
February 14, 2018	Everett, Washington, United States	Joshua O'Connor	An 18-year-old, Joshua O'Connor, was arrested after his grandmother discovered a journal that contained plans to commit a school shooting at ACES Alternative High School, and reported the plan to police. The journal outlined the plans down to the minute. His plan involved planting pressure cooker bombs under the bleachers and using zip ties on door handles. His grandmother also discovered a Hi-Point carbine rifle hidden in his room. A judge sentenced O'Connor to a minimum of 22½ years in state prison.
February 20, 2018	Massillon, Ohio, United States	Keith Simons	13-year-old Keith Simons armed himself with a semi-automatic rifle inside a Jackson Middle School bathroom before walking outside. He then turned around and killed himself inside the bathroom. Notes found on his phone expressed admiration for the Columbine shooters. He also possessed ammunition, bottle rockets, and batteries.
February 22, 2019	Khabarovsk, Russia	Alexander Onufrienko	18-year-old Alexander Onufrienko was planning an attack on the high school he used to attend. He was a nationalist and an admirer of Anders Breivik and wanted to "surpass" him.
January 8, 2020	Cuyahoga Falls, Ohio, United States	Allen Martin Kenna	20-year-old Allen Martin Kenna was arrested after he was caught by a custodian lurking around a school after hours, taking photographs of the building. When his home was searched, police found multiple electronic devices, knives, firearm magazines, ammunition, and various items intended to be used in the creation of an improvised explosive device. Kenna had been documenting his plans and desires in a journal. His search history showed he researched how to carry out an attack at Cuyahoga Falls High School using explosives and firearms, and searched for other mass shooters. He was sentenced to 5 years in prison.
January 30, 2020	Warsaw, Poland	Unknown	Two students planned to attack their technical college with detonating bombs. The attack was inspired by the Columbine High School massacre. Their activity was noticed by police officers fighting cybercrime, and a few days later they were arrested by the police.
February 18, 2020	Kerch, Crimea	Unknown	Two teenagers planned to attack School Number 15 with explosives and nail bombs made using instructions obtained online. They were inspired by the Kerch Polytechnic College massacre and were arrested by the Federal Security Service (FSB).
October 28, 2020	Machinga, Malawi	Unknown	A group of Muslim individuals set fire to several locations within Mpiri Catholic Primary School, including the head teacher's office and a building on campus, in response to a teacher's refusal to admit a student wearing the hijab.
July 2021	Hillsboro, Ohio, United States	Tres Genco	After threatening his roommate with a gun, police detained 22-year-old, Tres Genco. In the trunk of his car, they found firearms without serial numbers, loaded magazines, and body armor. Upon further investigation, they found a manifesto written by the self-proclaimed incel praising Elliot Rodger. Genco had been conducting surveillance on an Ohio University, detailing his plot to specifically kill women at the university, and ordering additional gear online.
September 24, 2021	Dunmore, Pennsylvania, United States	Unknown	Four students attending Dunmore High School were charged for plotting a Columbine-style attack that was set to take place on April 20, 2024, the 25th anniversary of the Columbine High School massacre.
October 13, 2021	Leioa, Basque Country, Spain	Unknown	An unknown student entered the University Of Leioa with a hunting rifle and started shooting at doors and windows, but did not injure anyone. He was arrested by police.
December 9, 2021	Daytona Beach, Florida, United States	John Hagins	19-year-old John Hagins was arrested outside of his apartment with a 9mm KelTec SUB-2000 collapsible semi-automatic rifle and hundreds of rounds of ammunition (five loaded magazines each with 17 rounds and an extended magazine with 32 rounds). He posted messages to his classmates suggesting a plot to attack Embry–Riddle Aeronautical University on the last day of classes. Students informed campus officials who contacted the police. Hagins reportedly wished to replicate the Columbine High School massacre.
February 10, 2022	Lisbon, Portugal	João Real Carreira	18-year-old João Real Carreira was arrested for planning an attack at the Faculty of Sciences of the University of Lisbon. The alert for Carreira's intentions came from the FBI, which detected him on the dark web. The attack was planned to be carried out on February 11, one day after he was apprehended. Several weapons and items which were going to be used during the attack were seized, he also had extensive documentation and a detailed plan of the actions to be carried out during the attack. He was taken to the Polícia Judiciária premises. On February 11, the investigative judge decreed preventive detention. He was then taken to the Lisbon Prison, where he stayed for only a few hours until he was transferred to the São João de Deus Prison Hospital in Caxias. On May 13, the Lisbon Criminal Investigation Court decided that Carreira would move to preventive internment.
May 2022	Cape Coral, Florida, United States	Daniel Issac Marquez	The mugshot of a 10-year-old boy was released to the public by the sheriff's office after he made a threat to shoot up his school. He was sending stock images of guns to a friend, and the friend's parents reported him to the police. After his arrest, he was detained for 21 days.
May 2022	Great Falls, Montana, United States	Logan Sea Pallister	A 23-year-old man, Logan Sea Pallister, was arrested after telling a witness he was going to make bombs to use in a school and showing the witness explosive devices. They caught him at 4 am wearing a black trench coat and carrying a bag full of explosives on the day of his arrest. In his car, they found eight firearms, including three semi-automatic rifles and five handguns. Improvised explosive devices and materials used to make these devices, a silencer, and 4 pipe bombs.
May 2022	Donna, Texas, United States	Nathaniel Montelongo and Barbarito Pantoja	Two 17-year-old boys were arrested after an anonymous tip was sent in about their plans. When arrested, the two confessed to their plans to carry out an attack on the school on the last day of classes. Upon a search, police recovered body armor and a rifle.
June 5, 2022	Casa Grande, Arizona, United States	Joshua Adam Bowen	19-year-old Joshua Bowen was arrested after a fellow Call of Duty gamer contacted the police upon sharing his plans to shoot up a school nearby.
August 19, 2022	Vitória, Espírito Santo, Brazil	Henrique Lira Trad	Vitória school attack: Henrique Lira Trad, an 18-year-old ex-student of the Escola Municipal de Ensino Fundamental Eber Louzada Zippinotti, entered the school by climbing the outside wall. He shot and non-fatally injured three people with a crossbow, then walked into a classroom and threatened the students and a teacher. Students from another classroom barricaded themselves with desks to prevent Lira from entering. He was then restrained by a physical education teacher and arrested upon arrival of police. A bag with knives, Molotov cocktails, homemade bombs, 2 crossbows, arrows, and ammunition was found near the school. He said he wanted to kill at least 6 or 7 people and die in a shootout with police.
October 2022	Texas, United States	Noah Robert Calderon	The 22-year-old, Noah Robert Calderon of Burleson, Texas, was arrested after sharing photos of homemade explosives on his Snapchat. Upon their search of his bedroom police recovered a manifesto praising the Columbine shooters and belief in white supremacy. The search uncovered he stored 659.2 grams of explosive powder, along with a lighter, cannon fuse, cardboard tubing, a glass jar marked "frag" that contained metal ball bearings, lead, a funnel, and measuring spoons. His search history revealed he was googling "pipe bomb how to make," "how to make propane bombs," and "wear [sic] were the propane bombs in Columbine," as well as searches of the names of several local public schools. He was writing about how he idolized Columbine and posted photos of himself with guns in tactical gear. He was sentenced to 14 years in federal prison.
November 4, 2022	Pardubice, Czech Republic	Šimon Z.	A 19-year-old student of Tech-Chemistry High School planted a homemade explosive device next to the school. It failed to detonate, and students alerted the police. One day later, the perpetrator attacked a random passerby with an axe in a nearby town of Vysoké Mýto before poisoning himself and dying a few hours later in the hospital.
November 10, 2022	Roswell, Georgia, United States	Unidentified (because of his age)	A 13-year-old local male was taken into custody after a bomb threat towards a local preschool. According to investigators, the 13-year-old was on a bus when the threat happened before the bus driver called 911. He was taken into custody with charges of terroristic threats as well as him facing consequences from the Fulton County School System.
December 2, 2022	Bloomfield Township, Oakland County, Michigan, United States	Hassan Chokr	A 35-year-old Dearborn, Michigan man was arrested after yelling, harassed, and made antisemitic rants against both parents and toddlers at the Temple Beth El facility at a Bloomfield Township Jewish daycare. After being charged with ethnic intimidation, a federal gun charge was added because after the alleged verbal attack, the man went to a Dearborn gun store where he handled firearms and tried to buy numerous weapons. Authorities said he lied on a form about his eligibility to buy a gun. The man, who is a felon and cannot possess firearms, did not disclose it on the form.
February 13, 2023	Monte Mor, Brazil	Jonatas Da Silva Kiyokawa	On the morning of February 13, 2023, 17-year-old Jonatas Da Silva Kiyokawa launched a homemade bomb attack on Vista Alegre Public School in Monte Mor, Brazil. Two of the bombs, filled with petrol, nails, and ball bearings he threw exploded. On the outskirts of the school, five plastic bottles with flammable substances and nails that the attacker could not use were found. The attacker was armed with a hatchet and wore a swastika armband. He was arrested at the scene shortly after the incident. There were no casualties.
March 31, 2023	Colorado Springs, Colorado, United States	Lilly Whitworth	An 18-year-old trans woman, Lilly Whitworth, was arrested for her threats to shoot up a school. She was reported by her family and upon police's search of her home they found a 4-page manifesto, a hit list, directions on bomb-making, and a list of firearms to buy. She admitted to police she had planned on attacking multiple locations including schools and churches in the Colorado Springs area. She was charged with second-degree assault for planning the attack and was sentenced to 6 years.
April 3, 2023	Chesterland, Ohio, United States	Brandon M. Morissette	An 18-year-old student entered West Geauga High School with a 9 mm Smith & Wesson 910 handgun, and while loading the gun in his backpack in the bathroom, another student found a bullet on the floor and reported it to the school resource officer and administration. After an investigation by the school, the student was found. His locker was searched, and the 9 mm handgun was found along with three magazines. He was arrested on-site. The school went into lockdown and students were dismissed to their parents for the day.
April 10, 2023	Rio de Janeiro, Brazil	Unknown	On April 10, 2023, an 8th-grade student was found carrying a knife at Centro Educacional Souza Amorim, located in Vila da Penha, North Zone of Rio de Janeiro. The student claimed he brought the weapon for self-defense after seeing news about school attacks in Santa Catarina. The knife was immediately confiscated by a teacher and a school inspector. The incident was reported to the local police station for further investigation. No injuries occurred.
April 12, 2023	Portsmouth, New Hampshire, United States	Kyle Hendrickson	25-year-old Kyle Hendrickson was arrested for threatening to shoot up Portsmouth High School by posting Snapchats outside of the school holding a weapon. Law enforcement recovered an AR-15 rifle, a shotgun, camouflage body armor, a handgun holster, a red-dot sight, and numerous rounds of ammunition from Hendrickson's vehicle. He could face up to 5 years.
May 1, 2023	Oxon Hill, Maryland, United States	Unknown	A youth, whose age was not disclosed publicly, attempted to open fire on a student on a school bus in Oxon Hill, Maryland, but his gun had jammed. Three suspects were considered during the investigation.
May 26, 2023	Perth, Australia	Unknown	A 15-year-old former student at Atlantis Beach Baptist College in Perth began firing with his father's firearms, causing the school to go into lockdown. The teen has since been arrested and his name has not been released.
May 2023	Phoenix, Arizona, United States	Unknown	A 15-year-old was detained at Bostrom High School in Phoenix with an AR-15. The police found additional rounds of ammunition in his book bag and his lunchbox.
July 9, 2023	Edinburgh, Scotland	Felix Winter	A 15-year-old student at a school in Edinburgh had his devices seized and searched after British authorities received multiple tips citing the student had an obsession with the Columbine High School massacre. During the search, multiple files and documents related to the manufacturing of Homemade firearms and Improvised explosive devices were discovered, prompting the student to be arrested. On July 30, 2025, he was sentenced to six years in prison for plotting a shooting and bombing against his former school with the improvised weaponry.
September 27, 2023	Okeechobee, Florida, United States	Henry J. Horton IV	A 19-year-old was pulled over and the car was searched during a routine traffic stop. During the search police recovered a journal detailing a list to kill students at Okeechobee High School, followed by a stabbing spree at a church afterward, and killing his family.
October 2023	Wick St. Lawrence, Somerset, England	Reed Wischhusen	A 32-year-old man was arrested and received a 12-year sentence for plotting a shooting at the school he previously attended. During the search, Wischhusen went to the bathroom in an attempt to shoot himself but instead began firing at police. He was shot but not killed. Upon a police search of his home, they found an armory of homemade weapons and explosives, an abundance of ammunition, and a 1,700-word manifesto. He was jailed for life.
November 1, 2023	Cary, North Carolina, United States	Unknown male	A 46-year-old man from Cary, with an extensive criminal history in North Carolina and Tennessee dating all the way back to 2002, was arrested for cyberstalking and communicating threats after plotting to kill children at a local daycare. The National Center for Missing and Exploited Children was able to alert authorities there for the search of the man, before being taken into custody while spending the night at the Extended Stay America in Cary.
February 9, 2024	Texas, United States	Two Unknown 16-year old boys	Two 16-year-old boys from Lander, Wyoming fled their home state in a stolen 1969 Chevrolet Chevelle while plotting a mass shooting at a random Texas preschool. Both boys were taken into custody around six hours later following a chase in Sterling, Colorado, and were also charged in connection with the theft of a truck that was hauling a car on a trailer.
February 10, 2024	Ontario, California, United States	Sebastian Villasenor	An 18-year-old, Sebastian Villasenor was arrested in connection with intending to commit a school shooting at Ontario Christian High School. He was reported by a fellow student after he posted photos of himself online with firearms, similar to other mass shooters before him. Upon investigation, the police found 7 rifles, 2 revolvers, a shotgun, and more than 1,000 rounds of ammunition.
March 14, 2024	Vaasa, Finland	Evita Enni Bettiina Kolmonen	A 23-year-old female uploaded a video of herself detailing her plan to carry out a school shooting the day before her arrest. She uploaded a manifesto titled "The path to humanity's doom" which detailed her disdain for the overconsumption, selfishness, and hatred for materialism. On the day of the shooting she arrived at the school dressed in all black clothing and wearing a shirt that read "In each of us, two natures are at war--the good and the evil." She was caught in the parking lot of the Isokyro School with a loaded and cocked pistol, 7 full magazines, 190 cartridges, a knife, and a Molotov cocktail. Upon investigation, police found a journal in her room detailing her meticulous detailing of the attack going back to 2021.
March 20, 2024	Zagreb, Croatia	Unknown male	An eighth-grade student was caught composing a hit list of classmates on paper, accompanied by a photo of him with a weapon he posted on social media. The Ministry of Science and Education has acknowledged receiving a report from the school principal concerning the threat, assuring additional steps will be taken pending a thorough investigation.
April 17, 2024	Maryland, United States	Alex Ye	Ye, an 18-year-old high school student at Wootton High School wrote a 129-page manifesto detailing a plan of attack. It was reported after the manifesto had a statement that stated: "I have also considered shooting up my former elementary school because little kids make easier targets." The manifesto also described various ways on how Ye would carry out the attacks in violent detail. Ye was promptly arrested afterwards by sharing his plans on social media.
April 18, 2024	Nashville, Tennessee, United States	Unknown female	A 29-year-old local female preschool teacher was arrested by Metro Nashville Police after she brought multiple guns into her own preschool as well as making threats towards another preschool teacher and the school itself following an argument. One other teacher told police that she did hear the teacher saying “When I start shooting, you better run,” adding the school was placed on lockdown shortly after until police arrived.
May 1, 2024	Mount Horeb, Wisconsin, United States	Damian Haglund	Haglund, a 14-year-old Madison, Wisconsin resident and student armed with a pellet gun, was killed by police at Mount Horeb Middle School before he could breach the building. It was reported that Haglund had a "Columbine addiction". Haglund was laid to rest in Mount Horeb ten days after his death.
July 22, 2024	Southport, England	Axel Rudakubana	17-year-old Axel Rudakubana of Banks, Lancashire, formerly of Cardiff, Wales, used a pseudonym to book a taxi to take him to Range High School in Southport, his former secondary school, minutes before the school broke-up for the summer holidays. He was stopped by his father as he entered the taxi and left the scene. A week later, Rudakubana stabbed 13 people, 3 fatally, at a dance party in downtown Southport. Prosecutors asserted Rudakubana planned an attack at Range High School and was unsuccessful due to his father's intervention. In connection of the stabbings, Rudakubana was sentenced to 52 years to life in prison and was currently serving his long sentence at HM Prison Belmarsh in London.
September 13, 2024	Luton, Bedfordshire England	Nicholas Prosper	Prosper family murders: After purchasing a shotgun using a feigned firearm license, 18-year-old Nicholas Prosper planned to murder his family before killing students and teachers at the nearby St. Joseph's Catholic Primary School in Luton, where he had attended as a child. However, his plans were derailed after the shotgun was discovered by his mother, leading to only his family being murdered. Prosper was arrested after escaping to a wooded area. Authorities confirmed in a court hearing on March 18, 2025 stating that he planned the shooting for months as his house was ¾ of a mile away from the school, as well as his research history on shootings around the world. Prosper was sentenced to 49 years to life in prison and is currently incarcerated at HM Prison Belmarsh in London.
September 13, 2024	Montpelier, Indiana, United States	Zachary Allen Lester	A 22-year-old local man was arrested and felony charged after allegedly posting an online message on Snapchat indicating he intended to shoot up a preschool. According to a release issued by the Blackford County Sheriff's Office, they've witnessed a photo posted by himself on the application, along with disturbing messages adding that he's going to shoot after taking a shower at his Montpelier home.
November 2024	Shropshire, England	15-year-old male	A self-declared Nazi student, who was reportedly obsessed with mass shootings, was arrested for discussing whether to "shoot up" his school. In his possession were six air guns, a samurai sword, three crossbows, six knives (including an illegal butterfly knife), a baton, and a stun gun. He was later sentenced to 18 months' imprisonment.
November 7, 2024	Kenosha, Wisconsin, United States	13-year-old male	A boy entered Roosevelt Elementary School wearing a backpack and carrying a duffel bag before being arrested and later charged by police officers. At the suspect's home, police found a replica rifle that he filmed a video with, and several airsoft pistols.
December 19, 2024	Florencio Varela, Argentina	12-year-old female	A student carried a 9mm pistol to school and composed a 'hit list' with the names of 14 students. She had also written a letter, in which she said that she planned to kill them “one by one,” not only her classmates but also a teacher. A student reported her and the authorities were notified.
January 8, 2025	Middle school, Dr.-Hans-Güthlein-Weg, Germany	14-year old male	On January 8, 2025, one day after a stabbing of a 14-year-old student at a bus stop in Schnelldorf, Police in Feuchtwangen arrested a 14‑year‑old male middle school student whom had informed his friend that he would bring a knife to school. The friend informed a parent, with the school administration being notified before morning classes began. A search of his backpack revealed a kitchen knife, after which the teenager was taken into custody and transferred to a specialized psychiatric facility. During the investigation of the incident, authorities discovered the student had referenced a stabbing at a bus stop in Schnelldorf one day earlier to the arrest. This led the authorities to believe the student was planning an attack after being inspired by the previous day's stabbing, leading them to treat the incident as a potential “Nachahmungstat” (copycat act).
February 14, 2025	Mooresville, Indiana, United States	18-year-old female	A woman obsessed with and inspired by Nikolas Cruz plotted a similar attack inside Mooresville High School after grieving the then-recent death of her mother, had been bullied at school after being hit by a drunk driver, felt guilt after learning about the driver’s suicide after the crash, and became fixated by mass shooters afterward.
February 19, 2025	Houston, Texas, United States	Two female students	A female student plotted "a mass casualty attack" at Memorial High School in Spring Branch ISD, by putting pipe bombs in various locations in the school and using a gun to shoot students, with another student attending Willis High School.
February 25, 2025	Toledo, Ohio, United States	20-year-old student	A 20-year-old male student from Sylvania, Ohio was arrested after allegedly threatened to show up in a classroom with a bomb strapped to his chest. According to authorities, the threat was posted in a group chat for students at another university, and police said several students saw the post Courtright is accused of making before being taken into custody a short time afterward.
April 3, 2025	Ingeniero Maschwitz, La Plata, Buenos Aires, Argentina	Four unknown minors	Four minors, aged between 13 and 16, were planning an attack at the Escuela de Educación Media N°4 de Escobar, that was set to take place on July 13, 2026 with alleged firearms and were planning to kill from class to class and then commit suicide. The plan was revealed and they were arrested.
April 14, 2025	Oklahoma City, Oklahoma, United States	Jarmaine Fields	A 54-year-old Oklahoma City man was arrested after threatening to kill children at a daycare facility in order to "expel demons". According to an affidavit, officers were called to the Kidzone Learning Center in regard to a disturbance. After arriving, they met up with an employee who said that the man walked into the daycare and began yelling about how god had sent him to expel the demons. The man continued to yell about expelling demons from the children while walking further into the building. He walked into a classroom occupied by children and continued to yell that he was there to kill the children, but eventually left the building without assaulting any staff or children.
June 2025	Olsztyn, Warmian-Masurian Voivodeship, Poland	Three 19-year-old males	Three 19-year-old men were arrested for planning a terrorist attack on a high school in Olsztyn. Inspired by far-right mass killers such as Breivik and Tarrant, they intended to use firearms and explosives to carry out a mass killing at their former school. They practiced shooting, gathered explosive materials, and analyzed previous attacks. The plan was intercepted by Poland’s Internal Security Agency (ABW) before execution.
September 6, 2025	Tacoma, Washington, United States	13-year-old male	After receiving a tip that a 13-year-old boy had made “threats to kill.” against his previous school, Tacoma Police Department searched the home of the child, discovering an arsenal of 23 weapons in total, including long rifles, AR-style weapons, pistols, fireworks, and a handful of 3D printed firearm parts, many of which were inscribed with the names of previous mass shooters. The boy's social media accounts also had materials on them praising Eric Harris and Salvador Ramos. It was discovered the child had not been enrolled at school since 2021 - when he was nine - at a school of the Franklin Pierce School District.
September 29, 2025	Espoo, Finland	Eero Onni Tapio Tuunanen, 18	A man armed with a kitchen knife attempted to stab two students of immigrant background at Live Vocational College. The attacker wrote a short manifesto in which he stated his intention to harm the students and staff of the college. According to the manifesto, the defendant planned to kill as many "immigrants, leftists, transsexuals, and homosexuals" as possible. He was sentenced to two years in prison.
October 2025	Marikina, Philippines	12-year-old male	A student made an online threat on Facebook in a post saying "i will burn down my school", He then brought a semi-automatic rifle to school and pointed the weapon at a different student, allegedly as a joke, before turning it on himself and firing, dying at the scene of the crime. Police later investigated that he was linked to nihilistic violent extremism.
November 25, 2025	Pasadena, Texas, United States	Emilio Lopez and unnamed minor	Two students, 17-year-old Emilio Lopez and an un-named juvenile, at Pasadena Memorial High School were arrested after police investigated threats on social media. It was discovered the two had stockpiled ammunition and weaponry and allegedly planned a school shooting on December 1, 2025. The two were charged with conspiracy to murder on December 10, 2025.
December 2025	Domodedovo, Moscow Oblast, Russia	Two unnamed teenagers	Two teenagers were arrested for planning an attack on a school. They had ordered knives and axes and were reportedly planning to obtain pistols and ammunition.
January 6, 2026	Morristown, Indiana, United States	Alexis Pickett	After receiving a report from the parents of 17-year-old Alexis Pickett, police discovered that she had planned to commit a school shooting at Morristown Junior-Senior High School, prompting her arrested. Pickett pleaded not guilty to conspiracy to commit murder and intimidation on January 7, 2026.
January 6, 2026	Romulus, Michigan, United States	Shawntez Marshaun Gregory	Police were dispatched to Romulus Middle School at approximately 9:50 a.m. after reports of an armed man attempting to make entry to the school. The suspect was arrested without incident upon police arriving at the scene, with a handgun being recovered. Reports of shots being fired outside the school were also given. 44-year-old Shawntez Marshaun Gregory would be charged in connection to the incident two days later.
February 2026	Omsk, Omsk Oblast, Russia	Unknown male	A teenager was arrested after allegedly planning an attack on a school in Omsk. He was a reported Columbiner who discussed previous shootings online and bought an air pistol to commit his attack.
February 2, 2026	Laguna, Philippines	Seven unidentified students (five males and two females)	The Philippine National Police operatives on February 2 rescued the seven minors, effectively halting the reported plan of the latter to conduct a mass shooting in a school on February 16 in their province. The police alleged the teenagers met a "foreign" online individual while playing Roblox. That individual introduced them to violent online material. The teenagers had T-shirts printed with the words "natural selection" and "No Lives Matter" as well as Nazi paraphernalia. They eventually returned to their school but were subject to close monitoring by the social workers. The police have coordinated with the local ISPs on possible actions against the online platforms.
February 9, 2026	Sovetsky, Khanty-Mansi Autonomous Okrug, Russia	Unnamed male student	A teenager possessing an air pistol, knife, and ax entered a school after previously threatening other students and warning his classmates to not come to school. A teacher took the suspect's backpack and reported him to police, who arrested him.
March 2026	Tampere, Finland	16-year-old male and 18-year-old male	Two teenagers were accused of planning an attack targeting students and staff at Tampere Vocational College (Tredu). According to prosecutors, the suspects developed a detailed plan, obtained a floor plan and photographs of the school, and prepared and tested Molotov cocktails. They also handled two shotguns taken from a relative's gun cabinet but left the weapons there. The plot was reported to authorities by a third party, leading to the suspects' arrests in late March and early April. Both defendants denied intending to carry out the attack, claiming their activities were part of role-playing.
March 30, 2026	Curicó, Chile	15-year-old male	A 6th-grade student with autism brough a loaded pistol, legally owned by his grandmother, with four loaded cartridges to his school. Before entering campus, he was talked out of committing violence by his mother, and later arrested and charged with illegal possession of a firearm.
June 12, 2026	Santiago, Chile	20-year-old male	A 12th-grade student sent a WhatsApp message to the principal of the Instituto Nacional General José Miguel Carrera threatening a mass shooting, attaching an image of various rounds of ammunition and a penknife. After his arrest, in his possession were found ten .40 bullets, ten 9mm bullets, five 12-gauge shells, and multiple anarchist pamphlets. The student, who already had a criminal record, was originally set to be expelled, although due to complications, this was not possible and he was forced to be readmitted into the public school.
July 23, 2026	Puente Alto and Lautaro, Chile	10-year-old male and 11-year-old male	Two students, aged 10 and 11, who had seemingly been influenced by the 2026 Calama school stabbing, plotted out two different school attacks to simultaneously take place at their respective schools. They were both detained by the Investigations Police of Chile on the morning that their attacks were to be carried out. One of them was found to have four steak knives and a balaclava in his backpack, while the other had two knives and a spray can containing an unknown substance.
August 14, 2026	Lohja, Finland	16-year-old male student	A student armed with a bladed weapon and fire-starting materials attempted to start a fire at Lohja Upper Secondary School. The juvenile suspect told police that he had intended to carry out a school attack, and police found a manifesto in his possession.
September 9, 2026	Medellín, Colombia	Johan Sebastián Ovalle Vélez	A 17-year-old student carrying a CO2 traumatic pistol attempted to attack the Gabriel García Márquez Educational Institution. He opened fire on the school's courtyard, injuring no one, at which point students and teachers barricaded themselves in the classrooms. The student then shot himself in the head, leaving himself in a critical state and later dying on September 25. Two adults, who had allegedly illegally sold him the weapon, entered the school to dispose of the weapon, but they were quickly caught and arrested.
October 22, 2026	Corona, California	Two 15-year-old females	Two 15-year-old female students. One from Corona High School, the other from Norco High School, were arrested for planning a school shooting at Corona High School. Their motives were investigated as revenge as the primary motive for the planned attack. Both students were arrested on the charges that there were was a hit list of targets and that social media posts indicate plans of an attack.

== See also ==
- School bullying
- School shooting
- School violence
- 2012 Waller killings
- List of unsuccessful terrorist plots in the United States post-9/11
