= 2012 Waller killings =

Familicide in Texas, U.S.

- Map of Waller County, Texas
- Location: Waller, Texas, U.S.
- Date: March 20, 2012; 14 years ago 1:00 p.m. (CDT)
- Target: Family members
- Attack type: Familicide; mass murder; fratricide; matricide; patricide
- Weapons: Shotgun; 9mm Glock semi-automatic pistol; 9mm Hi-Point Model 995 carbine rifle (unused); AR-15–style rifle; .22-caliber rifle
- Victims: Rhonda Wyse Sesler; Mark Alan Sesler; Lawton Ray Sesler Jr.
- Perpetrator: Trey Eric Sesler
- Motive: Plans to perpetrate a school shooting; Desire for infamy and to outdo historical mass murders
- Verdict: Pled guilty to all charges
- Convictions: Capital murder (3 counts)

On March 20, 2012, married couple Rhonda and Lawton Sesler and their eldest son Mark Sesler were killed in a shooting at their home in Waller, Texas, United States. Police arrested the younger son, 22-year-old Trey Sesler, the same day at a friend's house. Investigators say that Sesler was heavily inspired by the Columbine High School massacre and had initially planned a school shooting at Waller High School after murdering his family.

== Shooting ==
=== Familicide ===
On Monday, March 19, 2012, a report was made about gunshots coming from the family home; however, nothing was discovered by police when they arrived.

At some point before 1 p.m. the following day, Rhonda Sesler took Trey to the garage to show him a dent in her car that was made recently by an unrelated party, and Trey instantly took this opportunity to shoot her at point blank range with a .22 rifle four times. His father is believed to have been asleep at this time. He then walked back inside the home and shot his brother, who initially survived being shot and locked himself in the bathroom, only for Sesler to break down the door and execute his wounded brother with a pistol.

Sesler then moved through the family home armed with an AR-15-style rifle, firing at his mother at least twice. He proceeded to the bathroom and shot his brother Mark once in the head. Sesler's father Lawton was killed last. After the shootings, Sesler wrote things such as: "I love my mom, dad and brother" and "God forgive me because I cannot forgive myself” all over the family home. Waller police chief Phil Rehak described the crime scene as a "war zone".

=== Arrest ===
Sesler loaded his 2010 black Ford Mustang with a Hi-Point model 995 carbine rifle and over 100 rounds of ammunition. He drove to Waller High School, from which Sesler had graduated, and sat in the parking lot contemplating on following through with his plan. He ultimately decided not to proceed, and instead drove to a friend's home, where he also slept that evening. Police received a call from family members asking for a welfare check, as they hadn't heard from anyone in the house. Police went to the home at 1 p.m. and the bodies of Sesler's family were discovered and an arrest warrant was issued for him. Sesler was located and arrested at the friend's house in Magnolia, Texas at 9:30 p.m. the same day.

After the shooting, Sesler told investigators that he killed his family because they were the "first immediate human targets in [his] sight", disputing the media's claim that the reason for killing his family was to spare them the shame of his planned school shooting as inaccurate. Sesler backed out of the school shooting portion of his plan because it all became "too real". He was placed on suicide watch within days of his arrest.

== Victims ==
The three people murdered consisted of his mother, father and older brother:

- Rhonda Wyse Sesler, 57, mother of Sesler, first to be killed
- Mark Alan Sesler, 26, older brother of Sesler, second to be killed
- Lawton Ray Sesler Jr, 58, father of Sesler, last to be killed

Rhonda and Lawton were married for 34 years prior to the shooting. Rhonda worked at The Waller Times and Lawton was a teacher at Robison Elementary School.

After the shooting, Sesler contacted extended family members and apologized for his actions. His cousin, Robin Warner, said the family did not know about his online activities. Waller residents were deeply disturbed by the case.

== Perpetrator ==
Trey Eric Sesler (born August 3, 1989) is an American former YouTuber who went by the alias "Mr. Anime." Sesler told investigators that he heavily studied mass murderers and serial killers and had a desire of perpetrating a school shooting at Waller High School.

Sesler admitted to investigators that he committed other crimes prior to the shooting, including killing animals and shooting near schools in the middle of the night. He had killed several family pets before the shooting to prepare for the murder of his family. He had no criminal record prior to the shooting. Investigators called Sesler "a classic example of a killer who starts with small crimes and builds up to the unthinkable."

=== YouTube channel ===
On September 14, 2006, Sesler created the channel "LensCapProductions." Sesler's first few years on YouTube consisted of anime series reviews and skits. On December 27, 2011, Sesler posted a video telling his fans that he had been diagnosed with pneumothorax. Sesler would regularly show weapons in his YouTube videos. One month before the shooting, Sesler posted a video titled "Mr. Anime is planning something." In the video, he said he would be taking a "two or three-week break." He never disclosed what he was planning, however, investigators believe he was hinting towards the shooting.

=== Murder obsession ===
According to authorities, Sesler was heavily inspired by mass murder events such as the Columbine High School massacre and the Virginia Tech shooting. Investigators found a research paper on his laptop about serial killers such as Ted Bundy, David Berkowitz, Aileen Wuornos, Jerry Brudos and Jeffrey Dahmer, as well as mass murderers such as Charles Whitman, and Kip Kinkel, in which Sesler graded them on killing methods and what kind of weapons they use.

== Sentencing ==
Sesler was arrested and charged with three counts of capital murder shortly after the family shooting. On August 2, 2012, Sesler plead guilty to all charges and was sentenced to life imprisonment without the possibility of parole, the right to which he reportedly told the judge to take away because he feared he was a danger to himself and those around him. The Waller police chief described the courtroom as "somber" and did not hear Sesler speak during sentencing.

Many residents of Waller thought Sesler would receive the death penalty and were disappointed in the sentence handed down.

As of 2026, Sesler is serving his sentence in the Memorial Unit. Previously, he was located in the Terrell Unit in 2024 and the McConnell Unit in 2018.

== See also ==
- Columbine effect
- Bever family murders
- Browning family murders
- Prosper family murders
