= Prosper family murders =

2024 familicide in Luton, England

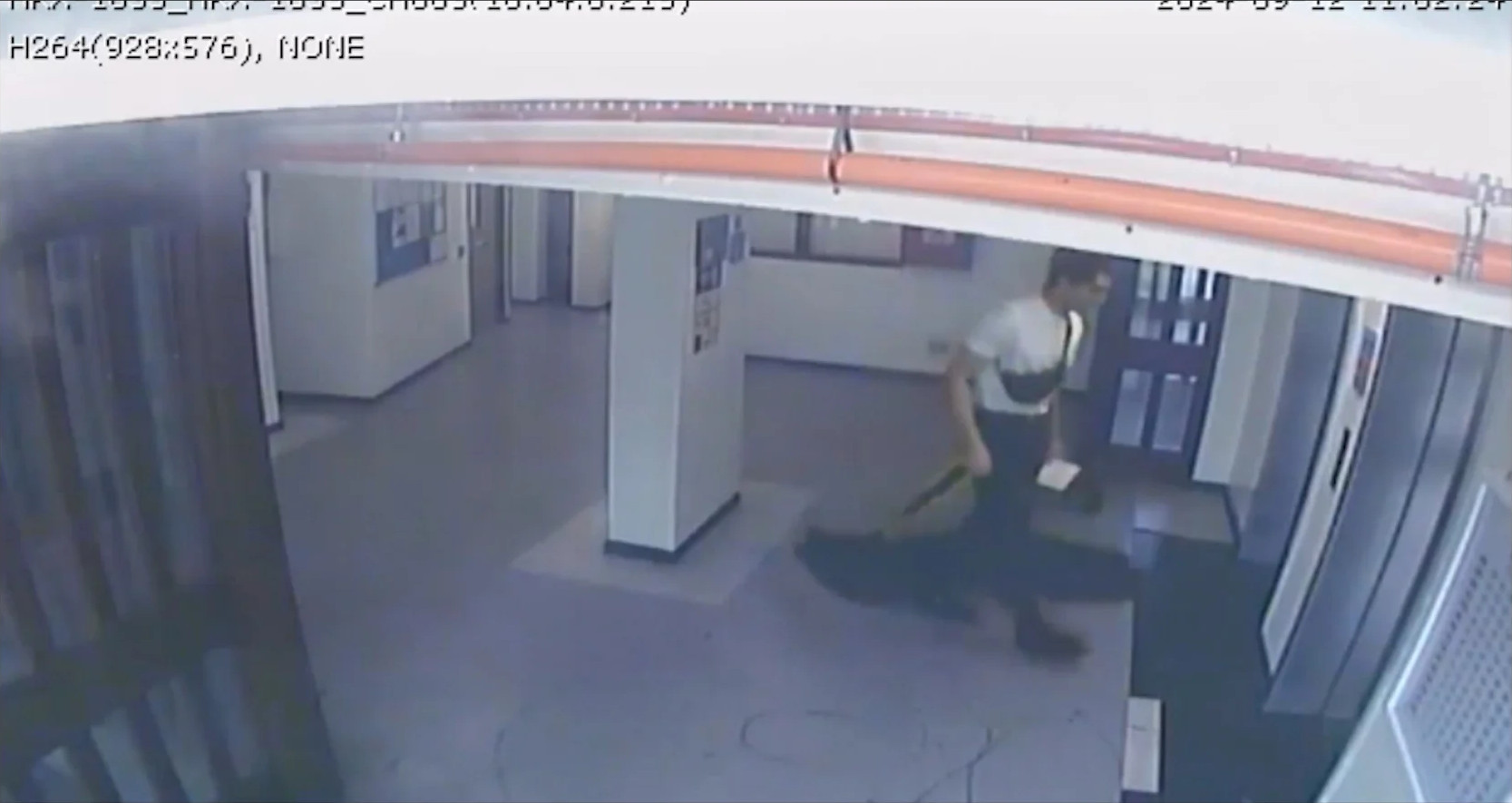
- Nicholas Prosper carrying the shotgun used in the attack.
- Prosper family murders (1), Site of Nicholas Prosper's arrest (2)
- Location: Wauluds Bank Drive, Leabank, Luton, Bedfordshire, England
- Date: 13 September 2024 c. 5:00 a.m. – c. 5:30 a.m.
- Target: Prosper family; St. Joseph’s Catholic Primary School (not attacked)
- Attack type: Familicide, shooting, stabbing, plotted school shooting, mass murder
- Weapons: 12-gauge Nikko double-barrelled shotgun; Several knives
- Deaths: 3
- Perpetrator: Nicholas Prosper
- Motive: Infamy; Sandy Hook Elementary School shooting copycat crime
- Convictions: 3 counts of murder; purchasing or acquiring a shotgun without a certificate; possession of a shotgun with the intent to endanger life; possession of a bladed article in a public place
- Sentence: Life imprisonment with a minimum term of 49 years
- Judge: Bobbie Cheema-Grubb

On 13 September 2024, 48-year-old Juliana Prosper and two of her children, 16-year-old Kyle and 13-year-old Giselle, were murdered at their flat in Luton, England. Juliana's third child, 18-year-old Nicholas Prosper, turned himself in to police the same day, confessing he had shot all three with a shotgun. While in police custody, Prosper also admitted to having made plans for a school shooting at his former primary school, St. Joseph's Catholic School in Luton.

On 24 February 2025, Nicholas Prosper pleaded guilty to three counts of murder at Luton Crown Court, along with all other charges. Through his writings and conversations in prison, Prosper stated that he regretted not being able to kill more people. He was sentenced to life imprisonment with a minimum term of 49 years.

== Background ==
Though there had not been a mass school shooting in the United Kingdom since the Dunblane massacre in 1996, the number of unsuccessful plots had grown in the years prior to the Prosper family murders.

Juliana Falcón (formerly Prosper) was born in Mar del Plata, Buenos Aires Province, Argentina, on 4 June 1976, and migrated to England, where she married Raymond Prosper, with whom she had four children. At the time of the murders, she was living in a flat off Wauluds Bank Drive with three of her children, including Nicholas.

=== Perpetrator ===
Nicholas Prosper (born 18 December 2005) was often described as a quiet and "geeky" boy while growing up with a strong interest in computers. Although Prosper initially had a friend group in his teens, he became increasingly isolated as he grew up. He was thought to display traits associated with autism spectrum disorder despite lacking an official diagnosis, but it was established at the trial that this did not provide the cause of his criminal actions. At one point, Prosper was banned from WatchPeopleDie, a website used for documenting imagery relating to people's deaths, for making pro-paedophilia comments. He also shared Islamophobic and Misogynistic sentiment on the website.

Prosper was reportedly fixated on mass shootings, drawing images of high profile mass shooting perpetrators on Instagram. He took a particular interest in the Sandy Hook Elementary School shooting. According to the judge's sentencing remarks, Prosper "explicitly sought to emulate and outdo" the massacre by Adam Lanza in 2012. He had also wanted to kill 34 people including himself to achieve a higher death toll than the Virginia Tech shooting. The intended massacre, which had been planned for over a year, was scheduled to take place on Friday the 13th. Prosper chose his former primary school due to his prior knowledge of the school's layout and security system. He was not bullied there. In August 2024, he attempted to buy a gun but failed.

On 12 September, the day before the shooting, he bought a double-barrelled shotgun and 100 cartridges from a local dealer for £650 using a fake firearms licence. The dealer believed the licence to be legitimate and notified police about the purchase that same day. He was not arrested, as Prosper had researched the logos, signature, and types of paper on which United Kingdom gun licences are printed, resulting in a well-crafted forgery. He spent the rest of the day engaging in online searches relating to instructions on how to kill someone with a shotgun, along with search queries relating to necrophilia and the murder of Sarah Everard.

A video uploaded by Prosper to Mega and shared on social media during the early hours of the day of the shooting shows him declaring himself to be a "follower" of Clementine, a fictional character from The Walking Dead video game series, and showing contempt for his sister Giselle for a specific in-game choice several months prior, saying "her face will be mutilated further than necessary". Prosecutors claimed this was not relevant to the shooting. While in prison on remand, a handwritten note was found in the sole of his trainer in which he said that he had wanted to "cannibalise my family, and rape a woman at knife point before the shooting". Besides the video uploaded to Mega, Prosper's last known internet activity was viewing images of the Columbine High School massacre before shooting his family.

== Shooting ==
On 13 September, from midnight until around 4:32 a.m., Prosper continued his online research he had started the day before and watched "extreme animated pornography". The first shot fired at the flat was a "test shot" targeted at a teddy bear in Prosper's bedroom. Sometime after this, according to the facts established at Prosper's sentencing, Prosper's mother, Juliana, is believed to have woken up earlier than Prosper had expected, and saw Prosper armed with the shotgun. Prosper had intended to kill his mother and two siblings in their sleep, believing that "three shots [in] under 30 seconds" would not create alarm from neighbours.

A struggle between Juliana and Prosper ensued, during which Juliana appeared to have suffered defensive wounds on her hands and arms from being attacked with a knife, which culminated in Prosper shooting Juliana in the head at close range, killing her. Her body was found in the hallway. Giselle had now woken up, with Prosper firing at her, grazing the back of her head. She fled into the living room and attempted to conceal herself under a dining table, but Prosper pursued and shot her in the face, killing her.

Kyle had fled to the kitchen and retrieved a knife to defend himself with, but was shot in the chest from a distance by Prosper and subsequently stabbed or slashed over a hundred times with a knife while he begged for his life. Despite sustaining serious injuries, including a punctured lung, Kyle managed to escape into the hallway but was then killed by Prosper with a shotgun blast to the head at close range. In total, Prosper fired seven cartridges inside the flat, and reloaded at least twice.

Neighbours described hearing shouting, fighting, and banging noises as the murders occurred. One neighbour, who began hearing the sounds shortly after 5:00 a.m., eventually went to the door of the flat to complain about the noise. She described hearing "banging and ruffling" noises and the sound of a boy groaning, followed by a gunshot-like sound, which prompted her to flee. The first 999 call came at around 5:29 a.m.

Prosper was recorded on CCTV leaving the flat at 5:33 a.m. Police first arrived at the scene at around 5:50 a.m., making entry into the flat at 6:08 a.m. Police discovered the bodies of Juliana, Giselle and Kyle and found blood stains and bloodied handprints around the flat. Several bloodied knives were also found. A copy of the novel How to Kill Your Family was found placed upon Juliana's body.

=== Arrest ===
Prosper had begun walking in the direction of St. Joseph's Primary School on Gardenia Avenue with the reloaded shotgun and 33 cartridges in a large bag, but high police activity and the realisation that it was too early for the school to be open prompted him to hide in a nearby wooded area for over two hours. During this time, Prosper shared the pre-recorded video where he referred to The Walking Dead online at 6:22 a.m., and disposed of two mobile phones, believing this would protect a group of paedophiles he spoke to on X. At one point, Prosper abandoned the bag containing the shotgun and ammunition in a bush.

At around 7:55 a.m., Prosper left his hiding spot and walked down Bramingham Road towards a passing police car, which he flagged down with a raised hand. Prosper believed that all the schools in the area would be locked down, and decided to surrender as a result. The arresting officers, who had been on the way back to the station from the scene of the shooting, noticed Prosper and arrested him after seeing blood on his face. During his arrest, Prosper said repeatedly "It's not murder."

He was charged with three counts of murder, purchasing or acquiring a shotgun without a certificate, possession of a shotgun, and possession of a bladed article in a public place. Indecent images of children were also found on his phone, but, due to the severity of the other charges, he was not charged in relation to them.

At the time of his arrest, he was wearing distinctive yellow and black clothing, acting as a "uniform" with which he had hoped to achieve notoriety. He had purchased the clothes in April 2024 and made a video of himself wearing the outfit, acting out the shooting with a piece of wood instead of a gun.

== Legal proceedings ==
As Nicholas Prosper was led out of his first court appearance on 16 September 2024, his father, Ray Prosper, shouted: "I still love you, son. It’s not your fault, OK?" before bursting into tears. Prosper's trial date was set for 5 December, but was later delayed until 3 March 2025. On 24 February 2025, Nicholas Prosper pleaded guilty to three counts of murder at Luton Crown Court, along with all other charges. Through his writings and conversations in prison, Prosper stated that he regretted not being able to kill more people.

On 19 March, Prosper was sentenced by Mrs Justice Cheema-Grubb to life imprisonment with a minimum of 49 years to be served. Sentencing was delayed after Prosper initially refused to attend court but was ordered to do so by the judge.

On 20 March, Prosper's sentence was referred to the Attorney General for consideration under the Unduly Lenient Sentence scheme. The Conservative shadow justice minister, Kieran Mullan, said: "What exactly does someone have to do in this country to be sent away for [whole] life? This was the most serious of crimes – including the murder of two children." Bedfordshire's police and crime commissioner, John Tizard, said he supported the sentencing decision of the judge. On 16 July the request for a whole-life order to be imposed was rejected by the Court of Appeal, with Lady Chief Justice Baroness Carr stating: "Appalling though these crimes were, we are not persuaded that anything less than a whole-life order was unduly lenient."

== Aftermath ==
In August 2025, a memorial bench was installed on Leagrave Park in memory of Juliana Falcón, Kyle Prosper and Giselle Prosper, listing their names, dates of birth, and date of death. In October 2026, Ray Prosper along with his wife stated their intention to repatriate Juliana's ashes to Argentina.

== See also ==
- 2012 Waller killings and the 2015 Broken Arrow murders, two similar events in the United States in which the perpetrators intended to carry out mass shootings after murdering their family but failed to do so.
- List of unsuccessful attacks related to schools
