= Stringfellow Unit =

Prison in Texas, United States

A.M. "Mac" Stringfellow Unit
- Location in Texas
- Location: 1200 FM 655 Rosharon, Texas 77583; 29°17′56″N 95°32′21″W
- Status: Operational
- Security class: G1-G4, Outside Trusty
- Capacity: Unit: 893 Trusty Camp: 319
- Opened: July 1908
- Former name: Ramsey II Unit
- Managed by: TDCJ Correctional Institutions Division
- Warden: Bridgette Hayes, Senior Warden
- Website: www.tdcj.state.tx.us/unit_directory../r2.html

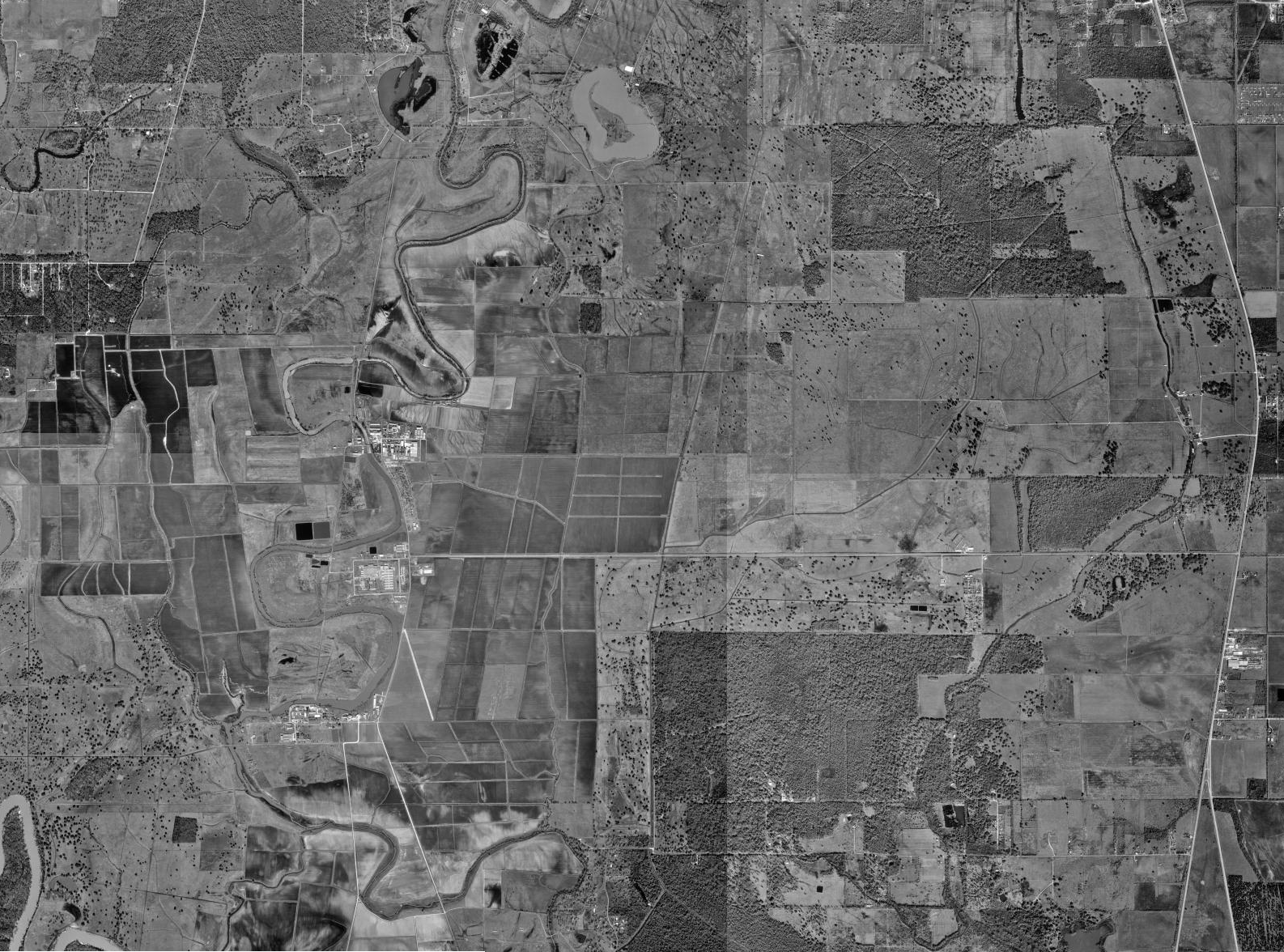
Aerial photograph of the Ramsey Units, January 23, 1995, United States Geological Survey

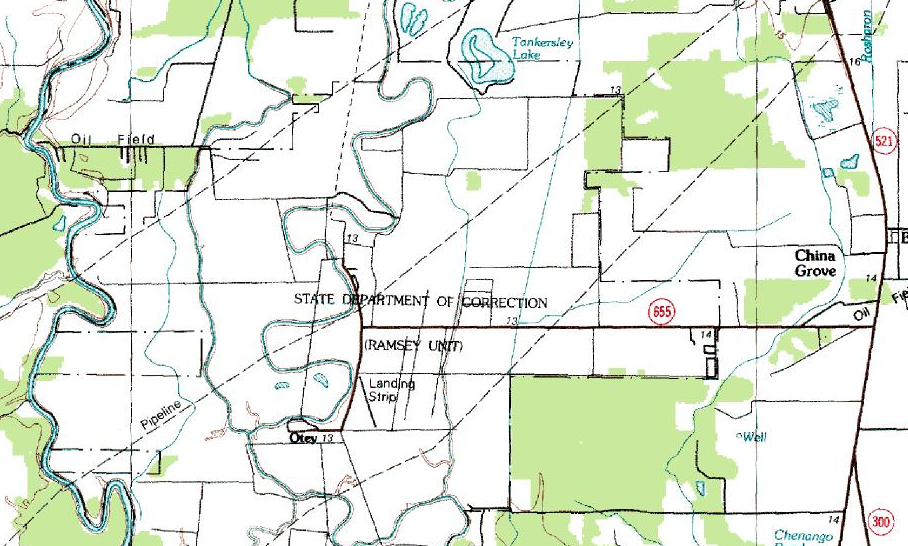
Topographical map of the Ramsey Units, July 1, 1984, United States Geological Survey

The A. M. "Mac" Stringfellow Unit (previously Ramsey II Unit) is a Texas Department of Criminal Justice prison located in unincorporated Brazoria County, Texas, with a Rosharon, Texas postal address it is not inside the Rosharon census-designated place. The prison is located on Farm to Market Road 655, 4 miles (6.4 km) west of Farm to Market Road 521, and about 30 miles (48 km) south of Houston. The unit is co-located with the Ramsey Unit and the Terrell Unit on a 16,369-acre (6,624 ha) plot of land.

== History ==
The unit opened in July 1908. The Ramsey Prison Farm consisted of five former plantations. In 1963, before racial desegregation occurred, the Ramsey II Unit housed African-American prisoners over the age of 25.

In 2006, the Ramsey II facility was renamed in honor of Alfred McIntyre "Mac" Stringfellow, a former TDCJ board chairman. Stringfellow served from January 2000 to February 2003.

== Operations ==
The Stringfellow Unit is within the attendance zone of the Alvin Community College. Stringfellow was included through H.B. No. 2744, filed on March 6, 2007.
