= Terrell Unit =

Prison in Rosharon, Texas

C.T. Terrell Unit
- Location in Texas
- Location: 1300 FM 655 Rosharon, Texas 77583; 29°18′37″N 95°32′13″W
- Status: Operational
- Security class: G1-G3, Outside Trusty
- Capacity: Unit: 1,389 Trusty Camp: 214
- Opened: September 1983
- Managed by: TDCJ Correctional Institutions Division
- Warden: Mary Ann Comstock, Eric Miller
- Website: www.tdcj.state.tx.us/unit_directory../r3.html

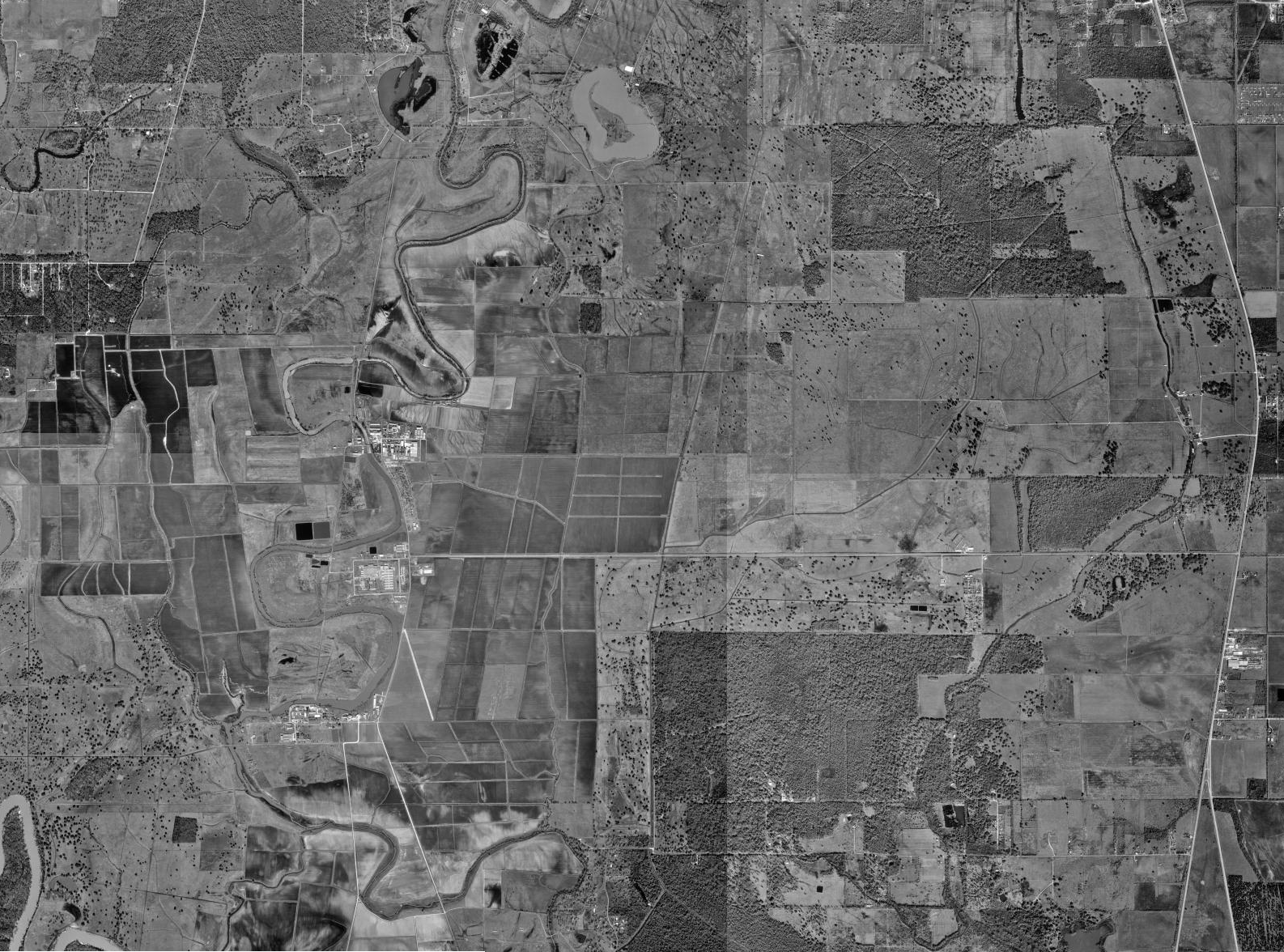
Aerial photograph of the Ramsey Units, January 23, 1995, United States Geological Survey

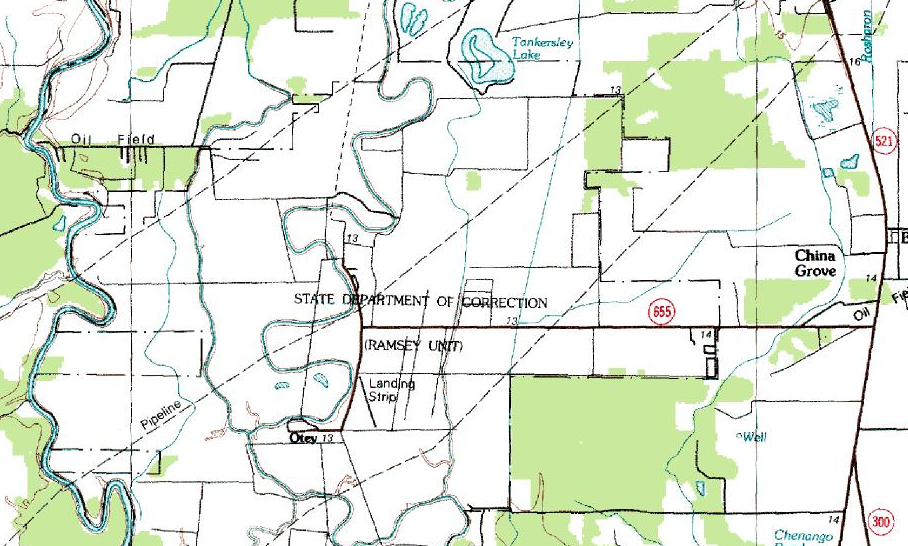
Topographical map of the Ramsey Units, July 1, 1984, United States Geological Survey

The Charles T. Terrell Unit is a Texas Department of Criminal Justice prison located in unincorporated Brazoria County, Texas, with a Rosharon, Texas postal address; it is not inside the Rosharon census-designated place. The facility is located on Farm to Market Road 655, 4 miles (6.4 km) west of Farm to Market Road 521. The prison, has about 16,369 acres (6,624 ha) of land, is co-located with Ramsey Unit and Stringfellow Unit. The prison is in Rosharon, and about 35 miles (56 km) south of Houston.

== History ==
The prison opened in September 1983. The Terrell Unit was originally the Ramsey III Unit. After the previous Terrell Unit (now the Polunsky Unit) in West Livingston, Texas began to receive death row inmates, the facility's namesake, a Dallas insurance executive named Charles Terrell, wanted his name off of the prison; as a result his name was transferred to another prison. The Texas Board of Criminal Justice voted to rename the Ramsey III Unit on July 20, 2001.

In 2008 a state investigation began in regards to accusations that a cabal of prison guards is organizing large scale smuggling of goods into the unit. A prison guard at the unit sent a complaint to Jerry Madden, a member of the Texas House of Representatives, saying that corruption was occurring at the unit. TDCJ investigators searched the entire unit. There were also allegations of officers having sex with inmates. After the investigation on the matter, Anthony Collins, the senior warden, lost his job. TDCJ investigators searched the entire prison to find evidence of corruption. The Texas Senate ordered prison officials to testify in a hearing related to the incident.

== Recent Developments ==
In 2024 and 2025, the Terrell Unit was included in a state-funded initiative by the Texas Department of Criminal Justice to expand climate control systems across its facilities. This project involves the installation of permanent air conditioning infrastructure to address heat-related safety concerns for both staff and the inmate population. These upgrades are part of a broader legislative allocation aimed at modernizing older units within the state prison system.

== Notable prisoners ==
Current:

Inmate Name	Register Number	Status	Details
Trey Eric Sesler	50028655 / 01799527	Serving a life sentence without parole.	YouTuber who went by the account name "Mr. Anime" convicted of the 2012 murders of his parents and brother.

Former:

- David Owen Brooks (1975–2020)
- Pimp C (2002–2005)
