= Bever family murders =

2015 familicide in Oklahoma, U.S.

- Location: 35°58′10.32″N 95°47′28.08″W; 709 Magnolia Court; Broken Arrow, Oklahoma, U.S.
- Date: July 22, 2015
- Target: Parents and siblings
- Attack type: Mass stabbing; mass murder; familicide; child murder
- Weapon: Knives
- Deaths: 5
- Injuries: 1
- Perpetrators: Robert and Michael Bever
- Motive: Desire for fame and to outdo historical mass murders; Plans to perpetrate a mass shooting after murdering their family
- Verdict: Robert: Pleaded guilty Michael: Guilty on all counts
- Convictions: First-degree murder (5 counts), assault with intent to kill
- Sentence: Robert: Six consecutive life sentences without the possibility of parole Michael: Five consecutive life sentences with the possibility of parole after 225 years, plus 28 years

On July 22, 2015, two teenage brothers, Robert and Michael Bever, attacked their family members at their home in Broken Arrow, Oklahoma, United States, with knives. The brothers murdered their parents, three of their younger siblings, and injured one of their younger sisters. Their youngest sibling, who was two years old at the time of the murders, was uninjured. It was the deadliest crime and mass murder in the city of Broken Arrow, until a murder–suicide in October 2022 that killed eight people.

12-year-old Daniel Bever called 9-1-1, saving the lives of his 2-year-old and 13-year-old sisters by alerting authorities. During the call, the brothers ambushed Daniel in his room and murdered him. The older surviving sister, Crystal, identified two of her older brothers, 18-year-old Robert and 16-year-old Michael, as the attackers. The brothers were subsequently arrested and charged with five counts of first-degree murder and one count of assault and battery with intent to murder. Robert Bever was sentenced to life in prison without the possibility of parole. Michael Bever was sentenced to life in prison with the possibility of parole after 225 years. The brothers plotted to commit a shooting spree after killing their family with the goal of outdoing previous mass murderers.

== Background ==
Robert Davis Bever (born September 17, 1996) and Michael John Bever (born November 4, 1998) were the eldest of seven children to David and April Bever.

Neighbors said the Bever parents homeschooled their children and kept them from interacting with neighbors or other children. The family's lifestyle was reported to be so inconspicuous that some neighbors found out the full names of the entire family for the first time when the medical examiner released them. Neighbors also reported strange and unsettling behavior by Robert and Michael.

Defense attorneys stated that David Bever was physically and verbally abusive toward his children, according to Crystal's testimony. Robert claimed that both of his parents were abusive to him and the other siblings. He said his parents would often talk about people they hated and would refer to the biblical Armageddon as "a retribution thing for everything they hated about the world".

Robert confessed to committing the familicide. He claimed that he and his brother planned the act for some time and intended to commit a shooting spree outside the family, hoping it would rival and even outdo both the 1999 Columbine High School massacre and the 2012 Aurora theater shooting. Robert later confessed that he and his brother planned to dismember the bodies of their family, place them in storage bins, and hide them in the attic of their home. He also stated that they planned to steal the family car, shoot and kill five random people each at multiple locations, and eventually achieve a body count of at least 50 people. Robert also stated that he admired serial killers, hoped to strike in locations outside of Oklahoma, and wanted to achieve a body count of up to 500 people or more. Robert talked about a plan to make two videos, one showing the bodies that they believed would only be seen by police and prosecutors, and another version without the bodies that could be posted online. The lead prosecutor for the state was Steve Kunzweiler.

=== Acquiring weaponry ===
Detectives said they found a hatchet, knife, darts and a surgical blade inside the Bever family home. Detectives also recovered wireless cameras, a bulletproof vest, a neck protector, a black mask and shin guards, along with computers and cellphones. A detective said Robert told him he got a job at a religious call center to earn money to buy knives, body armor, helmets, bullets and guns. He said they ordered body armor and collected knives for months. Robert told them he found out he could order guns and get them delivered to a gun shop. He said he ordered ammunition to be delivered to their home the day after their family was killed.

== Murders ==
At around 11:30 p.m. on July 22, 2015, police were alerted to 709 Magnolia Court by a 9-1-1 phone call made by 12-year-old Daniel Bever, who stated his brother was attacking the family. Screaming, commotion, and a male voice were heard in the background before the line went dead. Dispatchers tracked the address by searching the number. After a failed attempt to contact the father, David Bever, they dispatched officers to the scene.

When police arrived, they saw blood around the porch of the house. They knocked on the door, heard a faint voice calling for help, and forced their way into the house, where they found 13-year-old Crystal Bever, bleeding from multiple stab wounds. After pulling her out from the house, the officers found Daniel Bever and four others, who were all dead. Two-year-old Autumn Bever was found alive and unharmed in an upstairs room of the house. The brothers later testified that they had intended to decapitate Autumn. It was believed that one of the brothers responsible for the killings lured out the victims by pretending that he himself was under attack.

Crystal survived the killings but was critically injured from her wounds. She identified two of her brothers as the assailants, saying they lured her to a bedroom before slitting her throat and stabbing her in the stomach and arms. She underwent surgery at a nearby hospital and was listed as being in serious but stable condition. The surviving children were placed in state custody.

The parents, as well as three children, were all found stabbed to death. Knives, hatchets, and other bladed weapons were found at the scene, along with protective gear. Law enforcement officials said that at least some of the weapons found were used in the killings.

== Victims ==
Five people were killed in the familicide, and one was injured. A medical examiner determined that the common cause of death was "multiple sharp force injuries". Autopsies revealed the victims died between the late hours of July 22 and the early hours of July 23. The victims were identified as:

Killed

- David Bever, 52 (father; killed by at least 28 stab wounds to the torso, face, neck, and left arm and hand)
- April Bever (nee' Sharpe), 44 (mother; killed by blunt-force trauma and more than 48 wounds to the head, neck, torso, and arms and hands)
- Daniel Bever, 12 (brother; killed by 21 stab wounds to the back, shoulder, and chest)
- Christopher Bever, 7 (brother; killed by 21 stab wounds to the back, chest, shoulder, and lower leg)
- Victoria Bever, 5 (sister; killed by 23 stab wounds to both sides of the neck, her chest, back, and upper arm)

Injured

- Crystal Bever, 13 (sister; injured by a slit throat and stab wounds to the stomach and arms)

== Aftermath ==
The two killers fled the scene through the back door of the house when police arrived and headed into a wooded area behind the property. They were apprehended quickly at 12:18 am with the use of a K9 unit and arrested without incident. The suspects were identified as 18-year-old Robert Bever, the oldest son of David and April Bever, and his 16-year-old brother, Michael Bever; the pair were found hiding beneath a bush. Robert was armed with a knife at the time of his arrest.

One of the brothers "spontaneously uttered" that plans for the killings were stored on a flash drive inside the home. This flash drive was later retrieved by police when they searched the home for a second time. They also recovered computer equipment and video surveillance cameras, which they believed recorded the murders as they were located near where three of the victims' bodies were found. It was later determined that the brothers planned to make two videos, one depicting the bodies of their family that would be shown to investigators and prosecutors, the other without the bodies that could be posted online. The brothers were charged with five counts of first-degree murder and one count of assault and battery with intent to kill. On July 25, authorities announced that Michael Bever would be charged as an adult.

A conviction of first-degree murder in Oklahoma carries the punishment of life imprisonment or the death penalty. However, the Tulsa County District Attorney stated that Michael Bever would be exempt from a death sentence since he was under the age of 18 at the time of the murders. They never apologized for the crimes.

Michael Bever's attorney argued against the constitutionality of the decision to try his client as an adult, stating that his client would die in prison and that it was the same as the death penalty. He argued Michael should be rehabilitated instead of imprisoned if he was physically and emotionally abused at home, although no evidence indicated any abuse occurring in the Bever home.

Investigators looked into a shipment of boxes containing a total of 3,000 rounds of ammunition that was believed to have been delivered on July 23. They also began investigating social media accounts belonging to Robert Bever.

On July 6, 2016, it was reported that Robert Bever had attempted suicide by hanging with a bed sheet. Tulsa County Sheriff's Office spokeswoman Casey Roebuck said the suicide attempt, occurring earlier that year on June 17, was discovered by a detention officer during a routine security check. Medical staff cut him down and checked him, determining he was uninjured. He was then moved to suicide watch.

=== Bever family home ===
The family's home and site of the killings, 709 Magnolia Court, Broken Arrow, Oklahoma, had sat vacant since crime scene investigators and cleaners finished the forensic investigation of the murders. In many rooms, the walls have been ripped down to the studs because so much of the home was declared a biohazard after the murders. Local real estate agents have stated that the house also lost tremendous value after the killings due to the stigma that comes with living in a home with a violent past. It was believed the bank would have to sell the house for far less than what was owed by the family at the time of the murders. Because of the ominous appearance of the house, and similarities in the stories, some, including neighbors, had dubbed it "Broken Arrow's Amityville Horror House".

The house had an ominous dark roof that dominated the front of the structure. After the killings, it became a center for dark tourism by ghost hunters, urban legend seekers, teenagers, trespassers, and vandals.

In mid-February 2017, Broken Arrow's city council announced a plan to raise money through the Tulsa Community Foundation for the acquisition of the Bever family home. They hoped that enough money could be raised to purchase the house from the Bevers' mortgage holder and lending company, its then-owner. If enough funds were raised, it was planned to tear the house down and, in its place, create a memorial park and garden titled "The Bever Family-First Responders Memorial Park". The house was destroyed in a fire on March 18, 2017.

On March 27, 2019, Reflection Park was dedicated in an official ceremony. A path meanders through a knoll of grass where the Bever house once stood.

== Legal proceedings ==
The brothers were arraigned in court on August 3. They pleaded not guilty to the charges filed against them. A preliminary hearing was set for October 28. The date was later changed to October 9, and later to January 22, 2016. It was changed again to February 23, 2016.

On August 5, Tulsa County Judge Bill Musseman ruled that documents concerning the case be made public. They were released the next day, redacted to protect the victims' identities and sensitive information.

Robert Bever eventually pleaded guilty to all counts and was given five life sentences without the possibility of parole, along with an additional life term, on September 7, 2016.

Michael Bever's trial began on April 16, 2018. He was found guilty on May 9. On August 9, 2018, he was given five life sentences with the possibility of parole after 225 years.

On July 15, 2019, Robert Bever tried to attack two prison officers at Joseph Harp Correctional Center. An incident report states the attack took place around 4:36 p.m. in the prison dayroom. On November 17, 2020, Robert Bever was sentenced to three more life terms, bringing his total to nine.

Robert is currently housed in the Oklahoma State Penitentiary and Michael is in the Lexington Correctional Center.

== In popular culture ==
This case has been featured in several television programs including the true crime series Dateline on Oxygen TV which aired a documentary called "Killer Siblings: Bever".

HLN's true crime show Lies, Crimes & Video aired an episode about the case on February 28, 2021.

== See also ==
- 2012 Waller killings – Familicide in Texas, U.S.
- Browning family murders – Mass shooting in Maryland, U.S.
- Columbine effect – Legacy of the 1999 Columbine massacre
- Crime in Oklahoma
- Lyle and Erik Menendez – American brothers who were convicted in 1996 of the murders of their parents, José and Mary Louise "Kitty" Menendez.
