= The Waller Times =

The Waller Times in Waller County, Texas publishes local news, community/civic events, school news, and sports news weekly on Wednesdays. It was founded in 1991 and is still family owned and operated.

The paper is published weekly.
