= Browning family murders =

Mass shooting in Maryland, U.S.

Nicholas Waggoner Browning
- Born: February 9, 1992 (age 34); Maryland, U.S.
- Other name: Nick
- Parent(s): John W. Browning and Tamara Browning
- Status: Incarcerated
- Motive: Disputed: Alleged abuse by his strict father (defense & self-declared); Inheritance & avoiding parental rules (prosecution)
- Conviction: First degree murder (4 counts)
- Penalty: Life imprisonment (may become eligible for parole in 2031)

Details
- Victims: His father, John W. Browning, 45; his mother, Tamara, 44; and his brothers Gregory, 13, and Benjamin, 11
- Date: February 1, 2008
- Locations: Cockeysville, Baltimore County, Maryland, U.S.
- Weapon: 9mm Handgun
- Date apprehended: February 3, 2008
- Imprisoned at: Jessup Correctional Institution

The Browning family murders were the quadruple homicide of a family in Maryland, United States, in 2008, committed by Nicholas Waggoner Browning (born February 9, 1992), the family's eldest son, who is currently serving two life sentences for murdering his family—his parents, John and Tamara Browning, and his two younger brothers, Gregory, 13, and Benjamin, 11—in February 2008, when he was 15 years old.

The murders were the subject of a documentary on Killer Kids titled "Spoiled Rotten and Bad Dream".

== Background ==
Browning was born in Maryland on February 9, 1992. His father, John W. Browning, was an attorney, and his mother, Tamara, was a homemaker. He had two younger brothers, Benjamin and Gregory, and was an honor student and Boy Scout who attended Dulaney High School in nearby Timonium, where he played varsity golf and lacrosse.

== Murders and confession ==
On the evening of Friday, February 1, 2008, a week before his 16th birthday, Browning was spending the night at a friend's house and left in the middle of the night to return home. Browning went into his house after other family members were in bed and shot each of them using a gun belonging to his father. He was dropped off at his house by his friends the next day, February 2, where he called the police to inform them of the bodies. He confessed to the killings of his family on the following Sunday, February 3, and was charged with four counts of first-degree murder. He was denied bail at a hearing on February 5.

== Guilty plea and imprisonment ==
Although Nicholas alleged he had suffered abuse from his father, prosecutors argued that he murdered his parents "because he didn't want anyone telling him what to do" and his brothers so that he would not be required to share his inheritance. Under a plea agreement reached with prosecutors, Browning pleaded guilty in January 2009 to four counts of first-degree murder and was sentenced to four life terms in prison with two life terms to be served consecutively. Browning may become eligible for parole in 2031 after serving 23 years of his sentence with good behavior. He was denied a sentence reduction in 2014.

== See also ==
- Familicide
