= Danbury High School (disambiguation) =

Danbury High School may refer to:

- Danbury High School, Danbury, Connecticut
- Danbury High School (Lakeside, Ohio), Lakeside Marblehead, Ohio
- Danbury High School (Texas), Danbury, Texas
