= Danbury Independent School District =

School district in Texas, United States

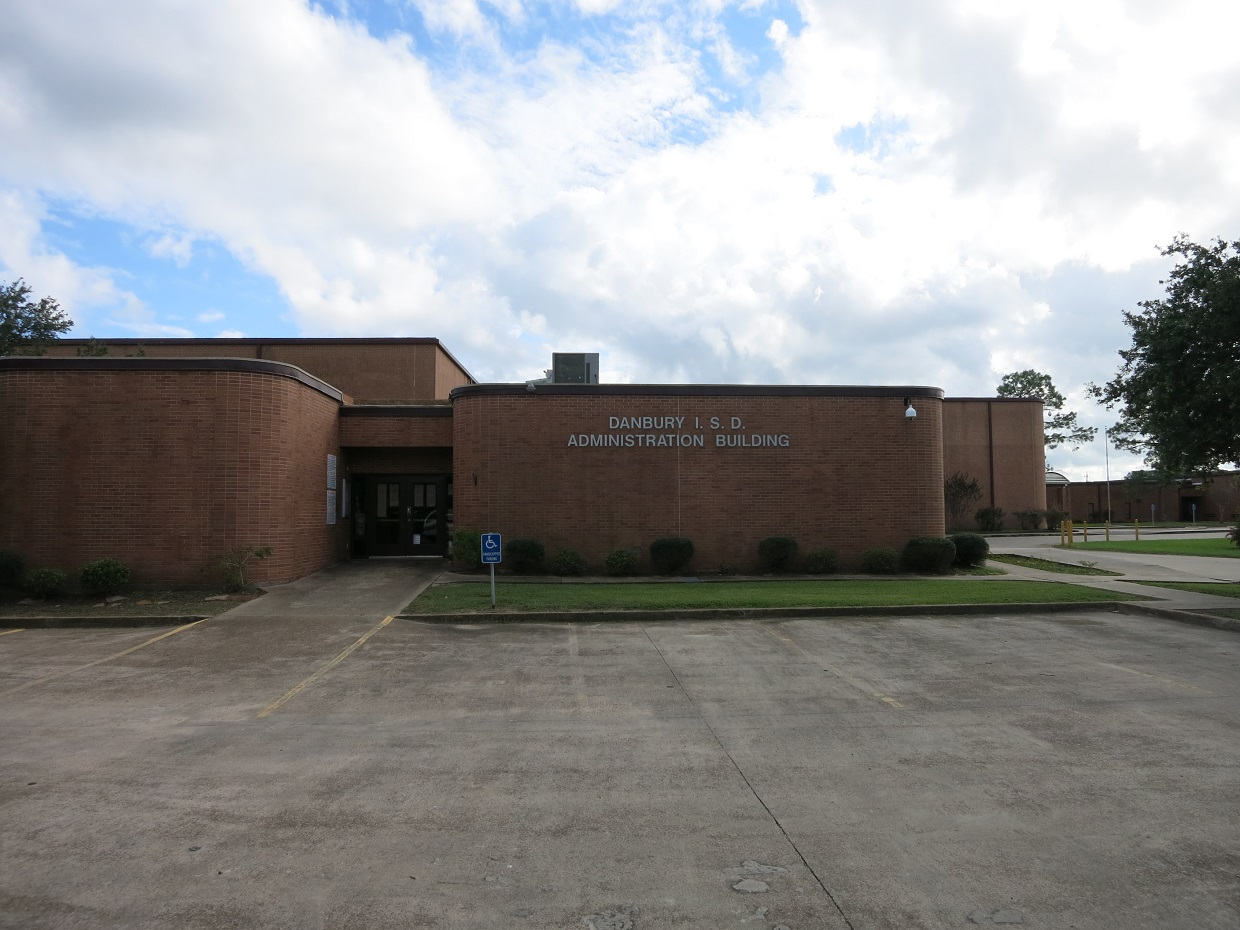
- Administration Building

Address
- 5611 Panther Drive Danbury, Texas, 77534; United States
- Coordinates: 29.23083°N 95.34010°W

District information
- Motto: Connect, Empower, Succeed
- Grades: PK–12
- Schools: 4
- NCES District ID: 4816290

Students and staff
- Students: 661 (2023–2024)
- Teachers: 56.90 (on an FTE basis)
- Student–teacher ratio: 11.62:1
- District mascot: Panthers

Other information
- Website: www.danburyisd.org

Danbury Independent School District is a public school district based in Danbury, Texas, US.

The High School's mascot is the Panther.

In 2010, the school district was rated "recognized" by the Texas Education Agency.

== Schools ==
- Danbury High School (Grades 9-12)
- Danbury Middle School (Grades 6-8)
- Danbury Elementary School (Grades PK-5)
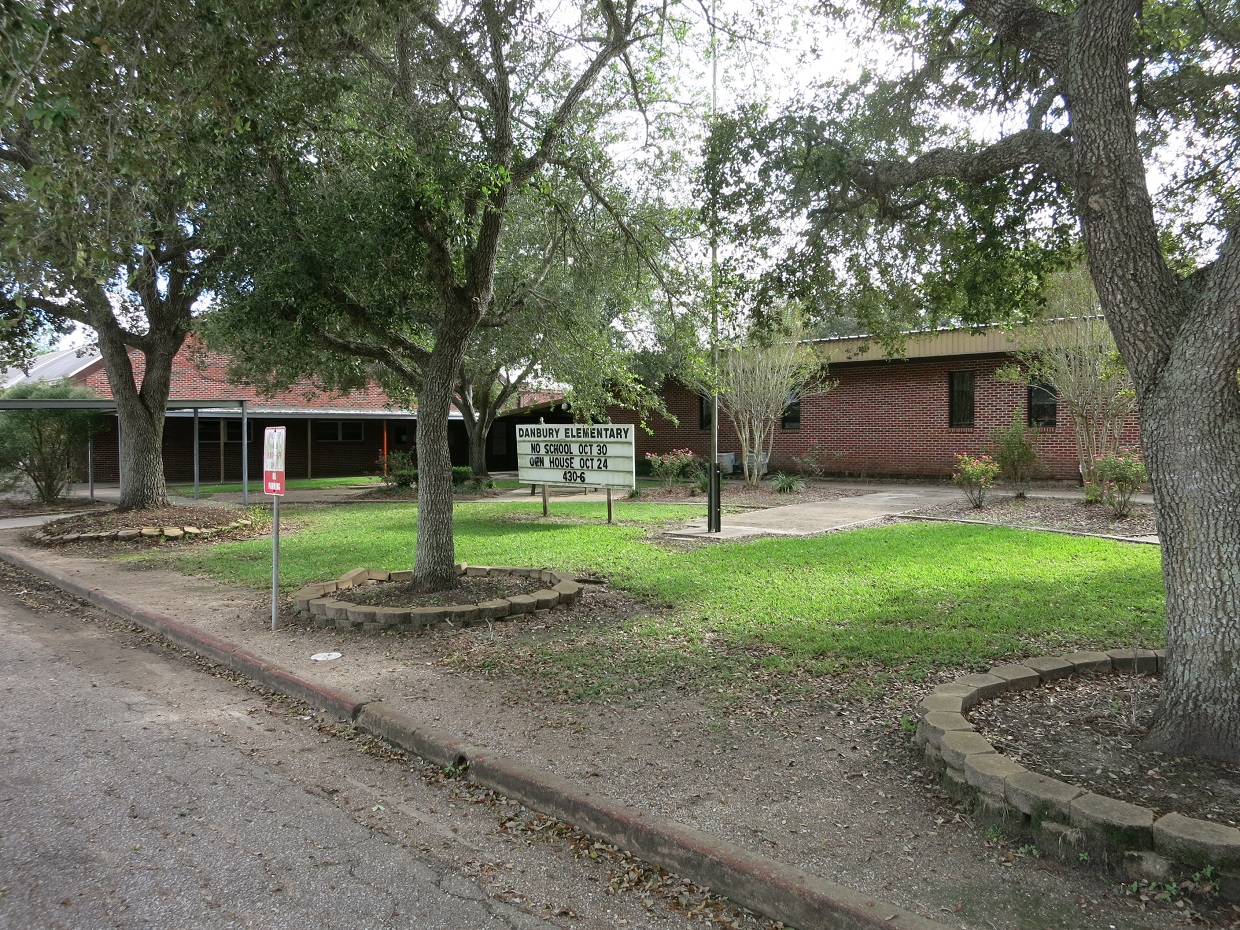
Danbury Elementary School

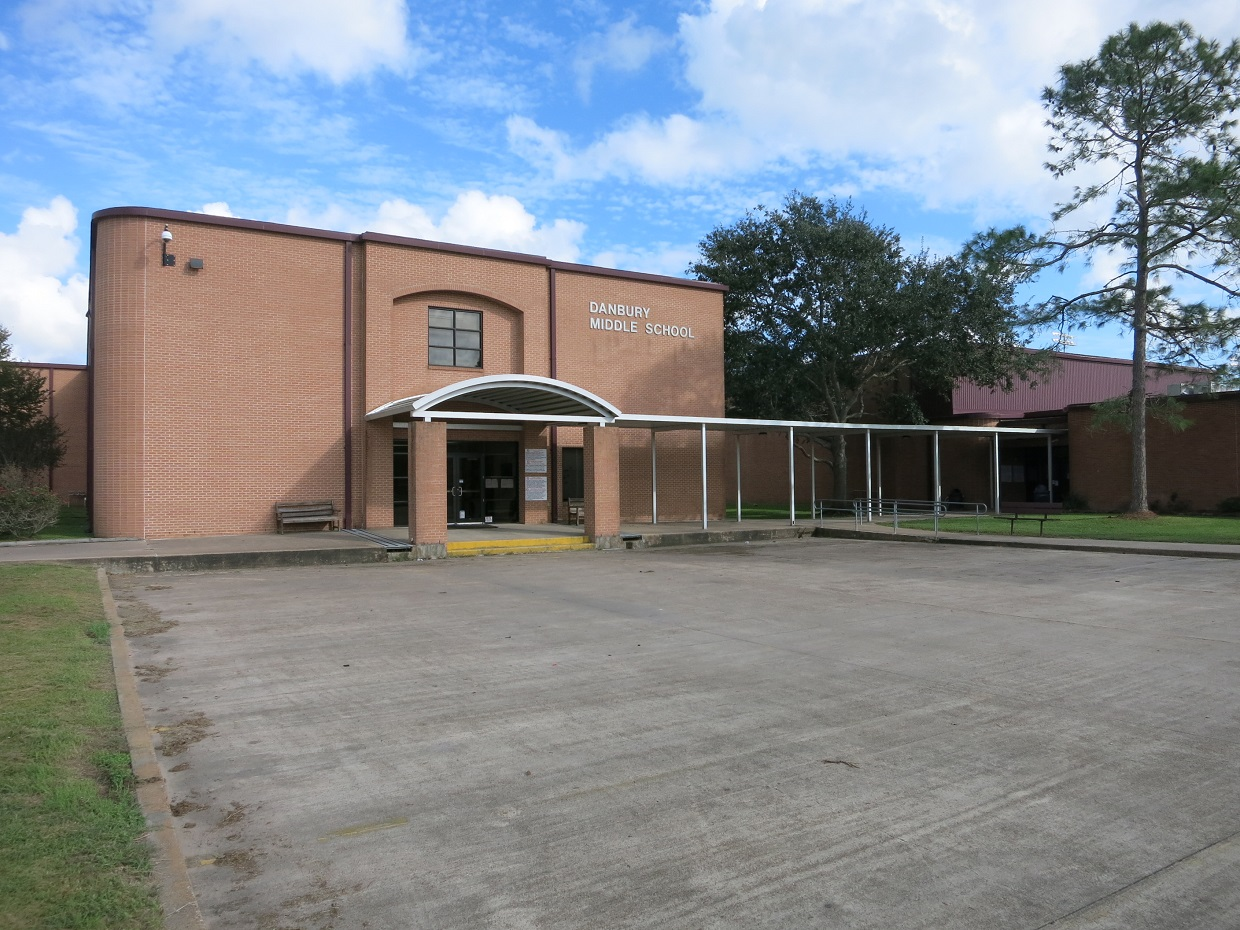
Danbury Middle School

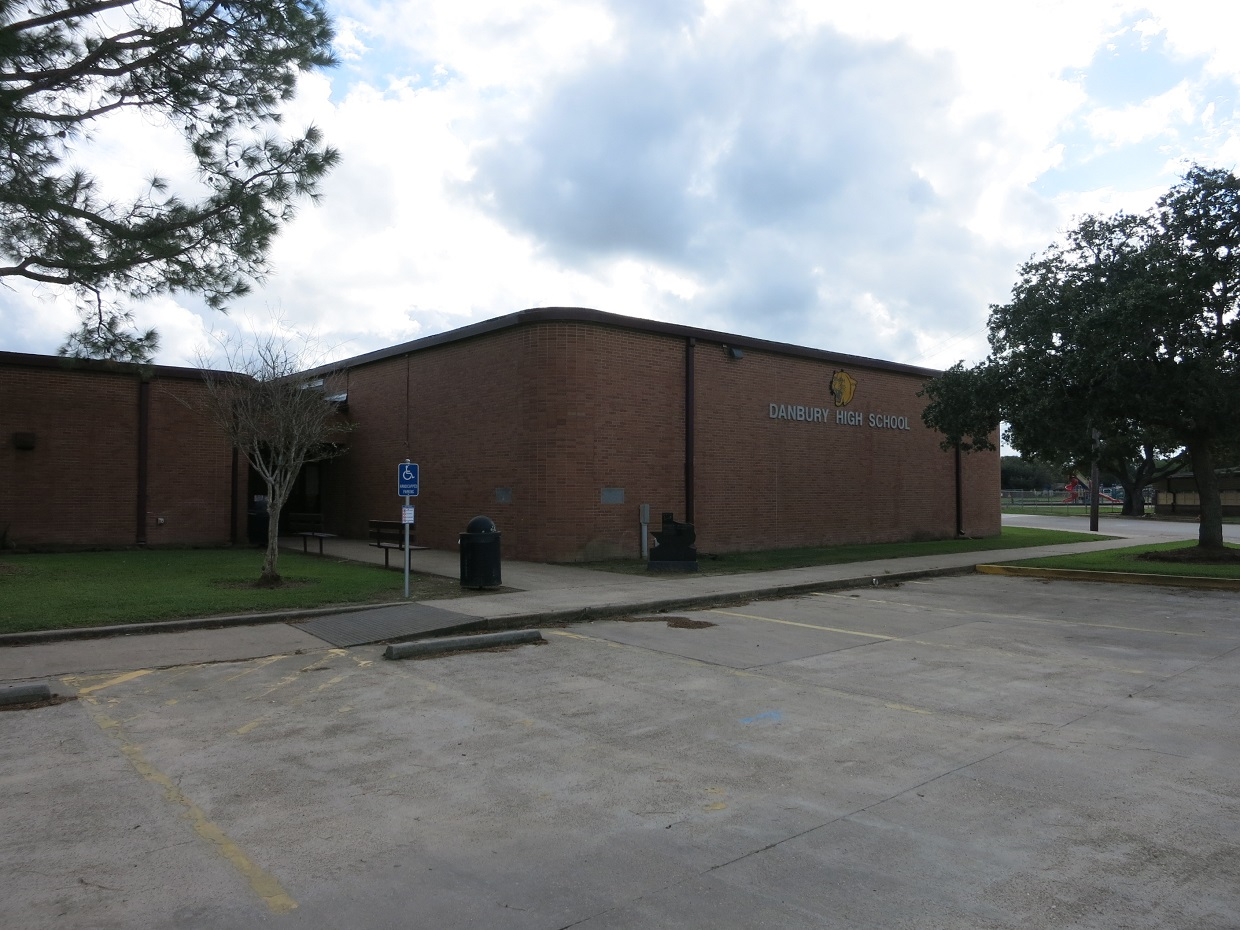
Danbury High School
