= Danbury, Texas =

City in Brazoria County, Texas, United States

Danbury
- City
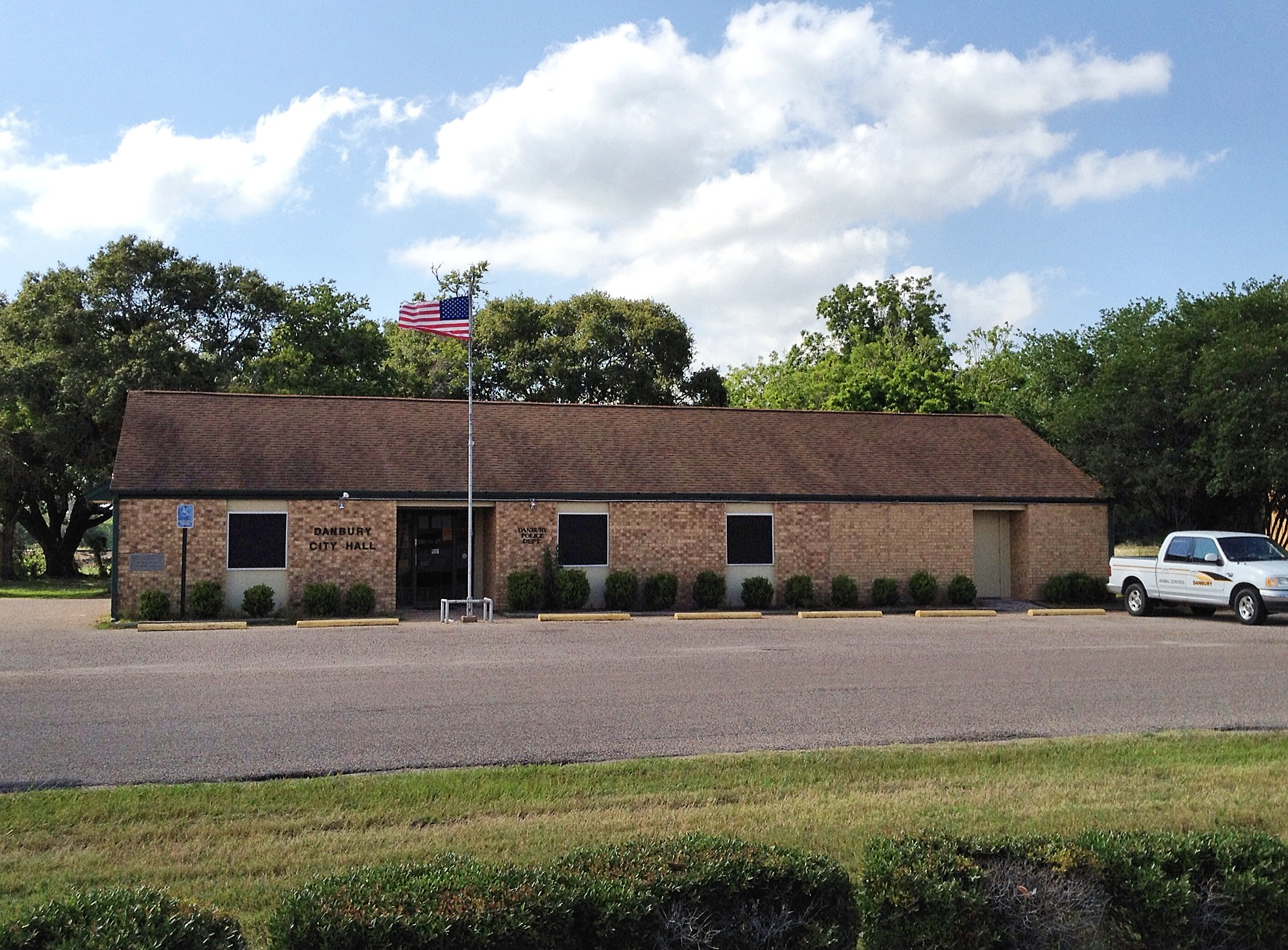
- Danbury City Hall. April 2012
- Motto: Small Town Big Heart
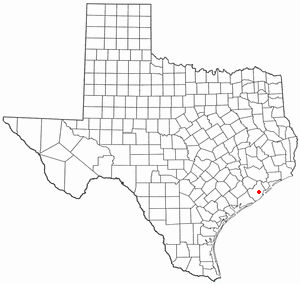
- Location of Danbury, Texas

- Coordinates: 29°13′42″N 95°20′42″W
- Country: United States
- State: Texas
- County: Brazoria

Area
  - Total: 0.97 sq mi (2.51 km^{2})
  - Land: 0.97 sq mi (2.51 km^{2})
  - Water: 0 sq mi (0.00 km^{2})
- Elevation: 23 ft (7 m)

Population (2020)
  - Total: 1,671
  - Density: 1,815.7/sq mi (701.03/km^{2})
- Time zone: UTC-6 (Central (CST))
  - Summer (DST): UTC-5 (CDT)
- ZIP code: 77534
- Area code: 979
- FIPS code: 48-19120
- GNIS feature ID: 1355621
- Website: https://www.danburytx.gov

Danbury is a city in Brazoria County, Texas, United States. It is located northeast of Angleton along the Union Pacific Railroad and County Road 171. The city boasts its own school district. Its population was 1,671 at the 2020 census.

== Geography ==
Danbury is located northeast of the center of Brazoria County, next to Flores Bayou. It is 7 miles (11 km) northeast of Angleton, the county seat. According to the United States Census Bureau, Danbury has a total area of 0.97 sq mi (2.5 km^{2}), all land.

In 2006, the average elevation was 21.4 ft (6.5 m) above mean sea level, which reflects a 0.168 in (4.3 mm) negative deviation compared to a 1998 study. This decrease is believed to be caused by the extraction of groundwater (9% of total declination), the extraction of petroleum products (88% of total declination) with a probable calculated seasonal difference in soil moisture accounting for the remainder. At the present rate of change, Danbury will lose about 2.18 in (55 mm) of elevation per 100 years, which is a rate 42 times faster than similarly situated areas.

== Demographics ==
Historical population
Census	Pop.	Note	%±
1970	807		—
1980	1,357		68.2%
1990	1,447		6.6%
2000	1,611		11.3%
2010	1,715		6.5%
2020	1,671		−2.6%
U.S. Decennial Census

=== 2020 census ===
As of the 2020 census, Danbury had a population of 1,671 people, with 355 families residing in the city. The median age was 37.1 years; 27.0% of residents were under the age of 18 and 14.4% were 65 years of age or older. For every 100 females there were 97.5 males, and for every 100 females age 18 and over there were 93.0 males age 18 and over.

0.0% of residents lived in urban areas, while 100.0% lived in rural areas.

There were 599 households in Danbury, of which 38.4% had children under the age of 18 living in them. Of all households, 56.1% were married-couple households, 15.4% were households with a male householder and no spouse or partner present, and 25.4% were households with a female householder and no spouse or partner present. About 21.2% of all households were made up of individuals and 7.5% had someone living alone who was 65 years of age or older.

There were 649 housing units, of which 7.7% were vacant. The homeowner vacancy rate was 2.1% and the rental vacancy rate was 9.2%.

Racial composition as of the 2020 census
Race	Number	Percent
White	1,291	77.3%
Black or African American	23	1.4%
American Indian and Alaska Native	14	0.8%
Asian	4	0.2%
Native Hawaiian and Other Pacific Islander	0	0.0%
Some other race	122	7.3%
Two or more races	217	13.0%
Hispanic or Latino (of any race)	344	20.6%

=== 2000 census ===
As of the 2000 census, 1,611 people, 554 households, and 442 families lived in the city. The population density was 1,678.1 inhabitants per square mile (647.9/km^{2}). The 586 housing units had an average density of 610.4 per square mile (235.7/km^{2}). The racial makeup of the city was 90.38% White, 0.62% African American, 0.19% Native American, 0.31% Asian, 0.06% Pacific Islander, 6.15% from other races, and 2.30% from two or more races. Hispanics or Latinos of any race were 15.52% of the population.

Of the 554 households, 46.6% had children under 18 living with them, 63.7% were married couples living together, 11.6% had a female householder with no husband present, and 20.2% were not families. About 18.1% of all households were made up of individuals, and 7.8% had someone living alone who was 65 or older. The average household size was 2.91 and the average family size was 3.30.

In the city, the age distribution was 31.9% under 18, 9.9% from 18 to 24, 29.5% from 25 to 44, 20.4% from 45 to 64, and 8.3% who were 65 older. The median age was 32 years. For every 100 females, there were 99.1 males. For every 100 females 18 and over, there were 95.5 males.

The median income for a household in the city was $50,536 and for a family was $56,250. Males had a median income of $44,250 versus $25,893 for females. The per capita income for the city was $17,565. About 6.0% of families and 7.6% of the population were below the poverty line, including 9.2% of those under 18 and 13.9% of those 65 or over.

=== Religion ===
Danbury is served by three churches (two Baptist and one Catholic), which claim as members 44% of the city's population.

== Municipal and government services ==
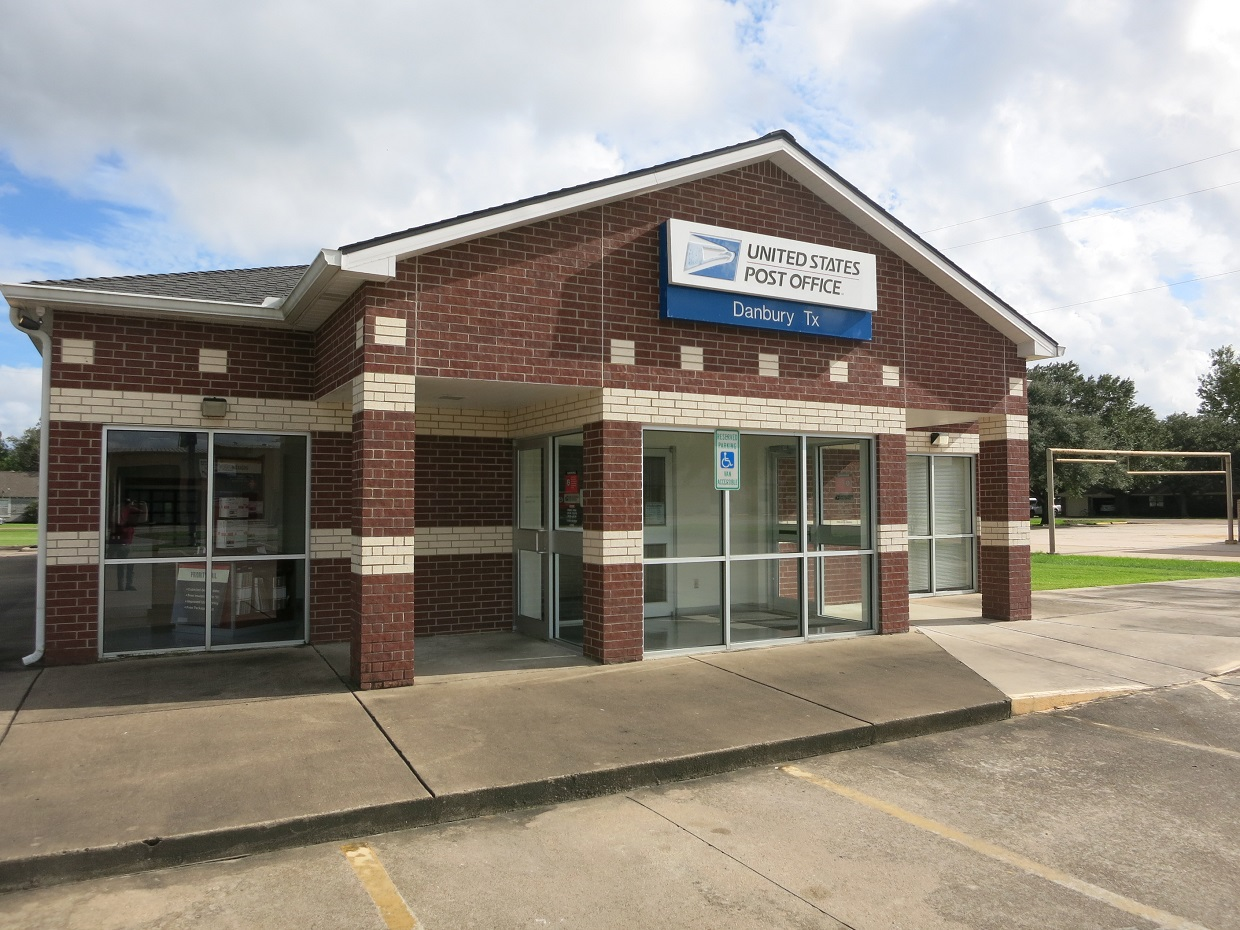
US Post Office in Danbury

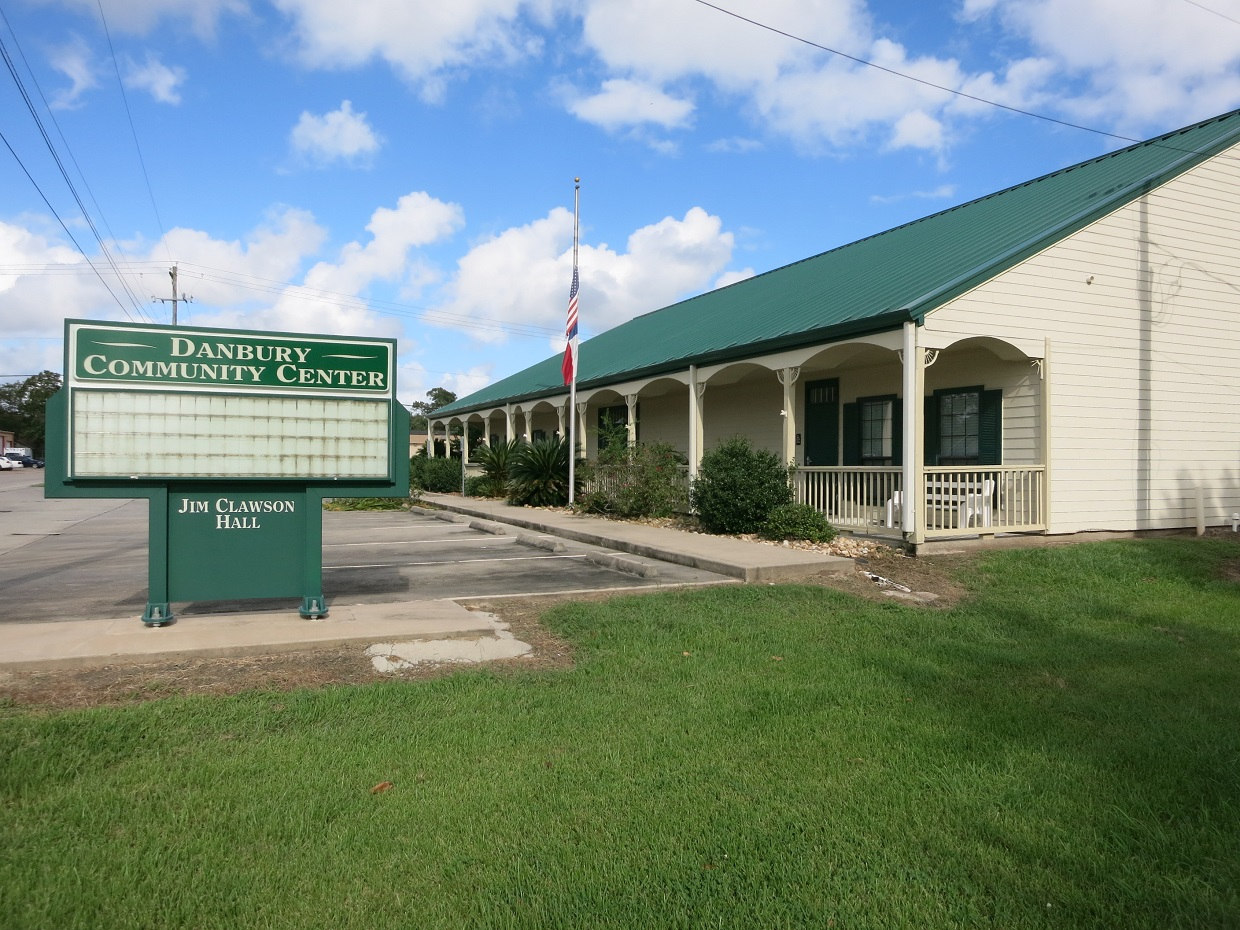
Danbury Community Center

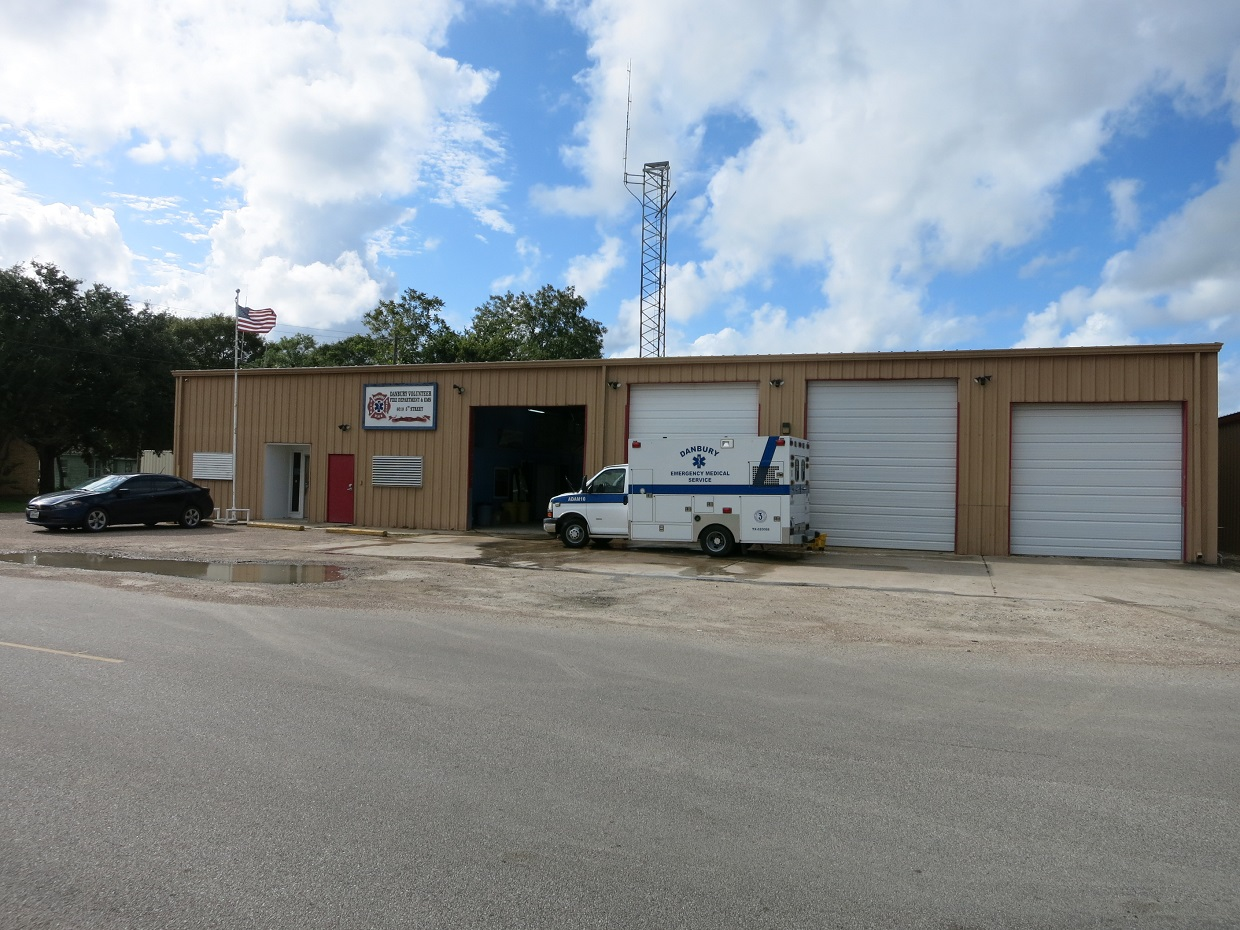
Danbury Volunteer Fire Dept.

The Danbury Library is a part of the Brazoria County Library System.

== Education ==
Danbury is served by the Danbury Independent School District.

School colors: Black and Vegas Gold

High school athletics: Danbury High School's athletics department offers football, powerlifting, volleyball, cross-country running, boys' basketball, girls' basketball, baseball, softball, track and field, tennis, golf, and cheerleading. The school also has a marching band. The track around the football field has been repaired/resurfaced, and a new weight room has been added, as well.

State titles: Baseball – 2009(2A) Softball – 2004(2A) 2011(2A)

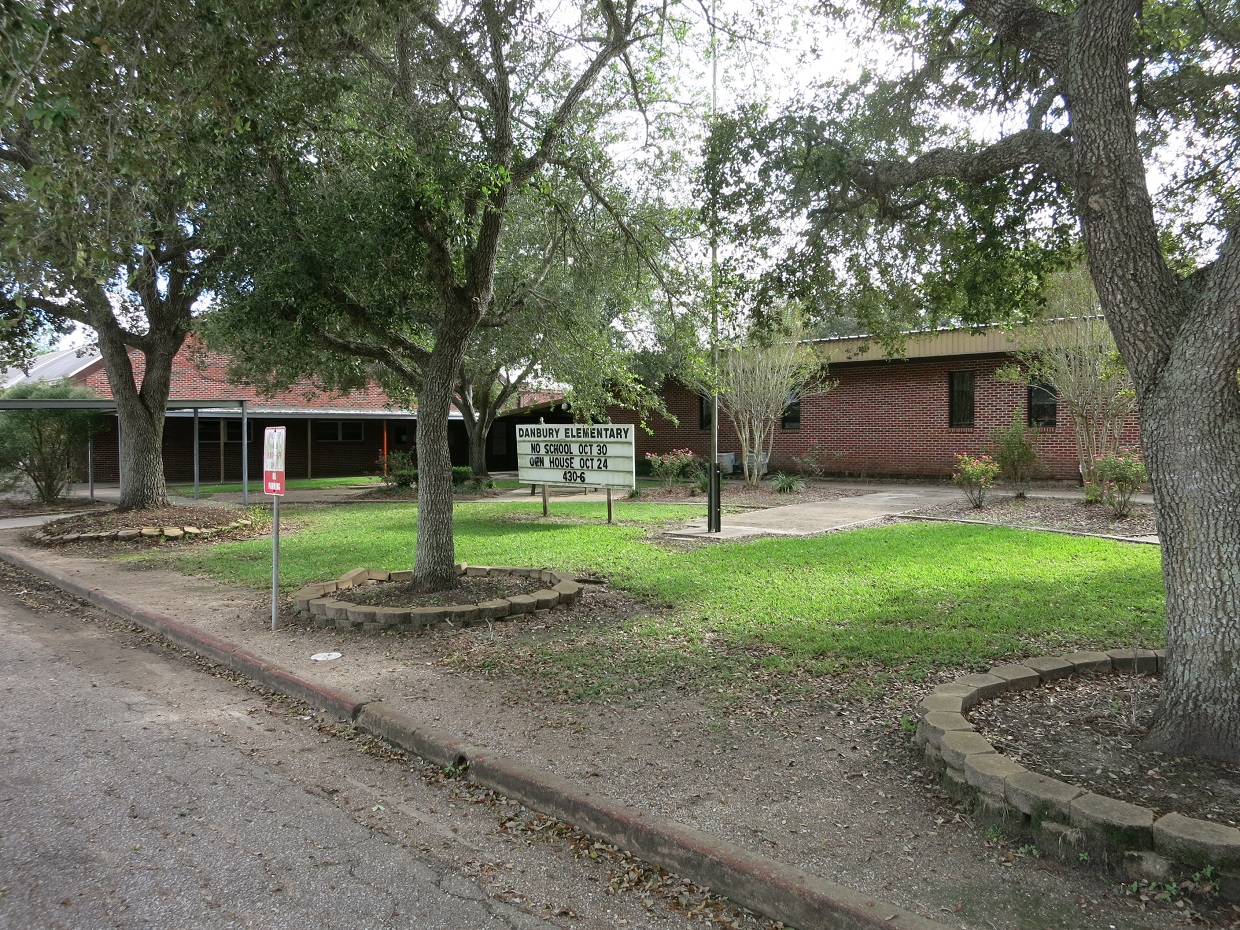
Danbury Elementary School

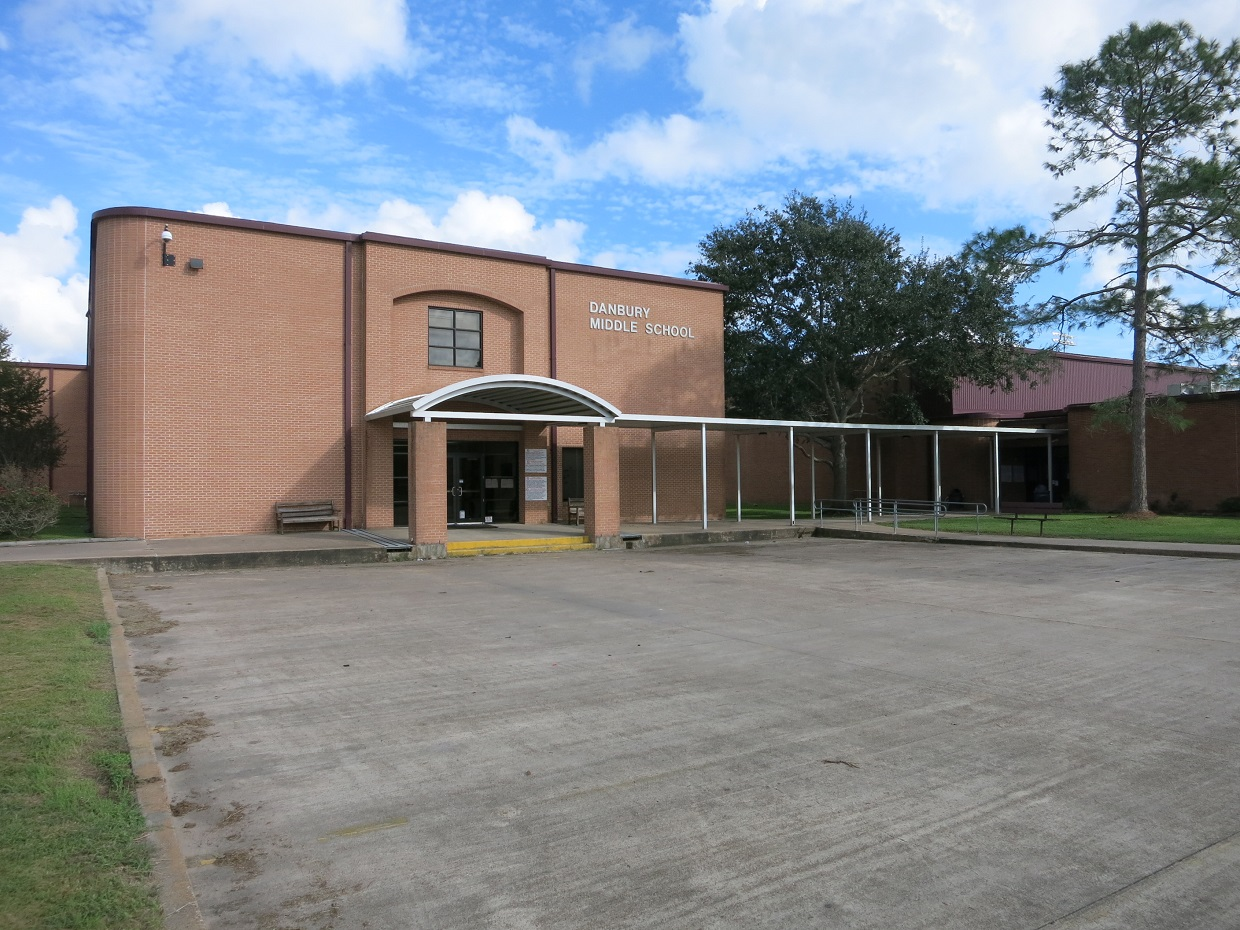
Danbury Middle School

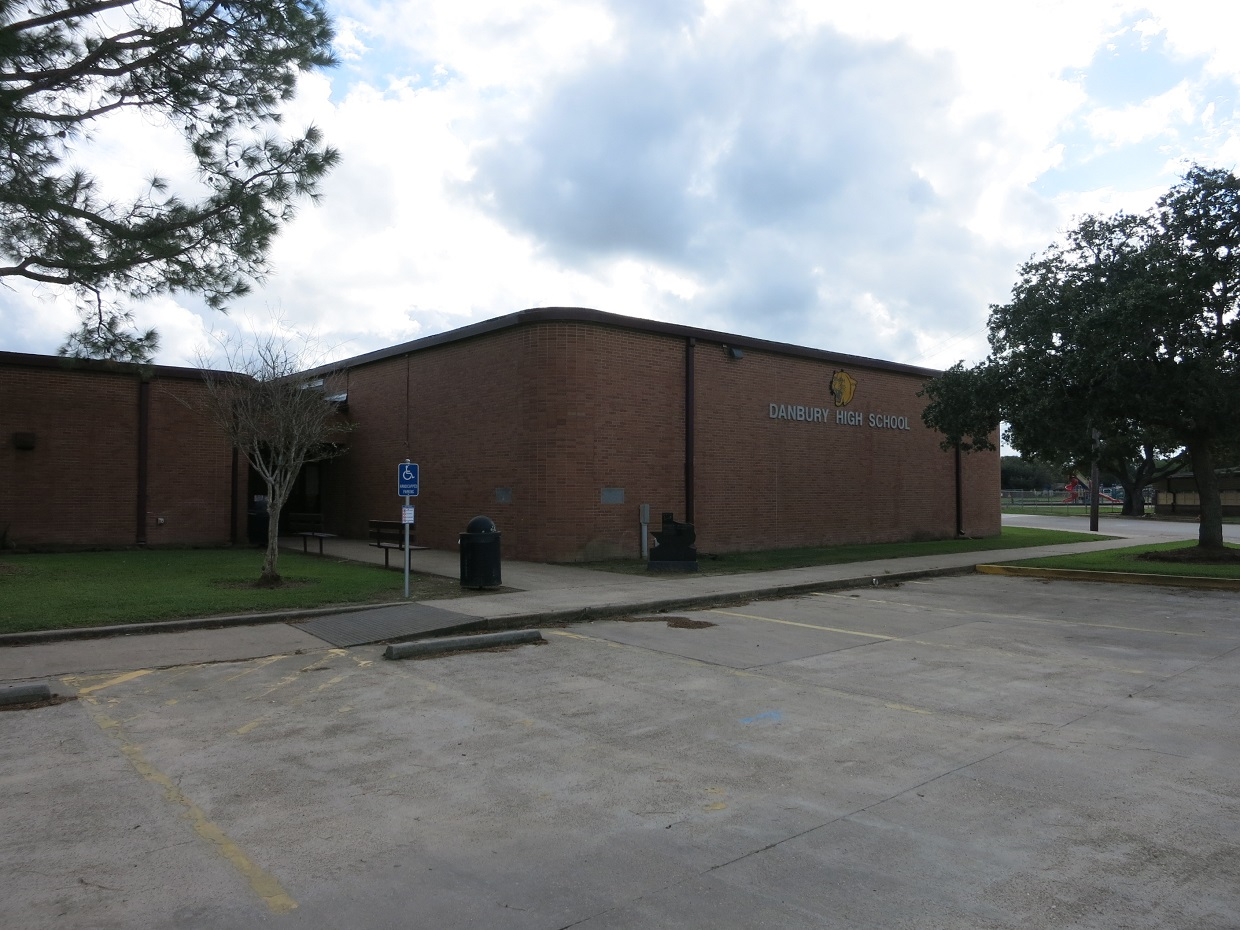
Danbury High School

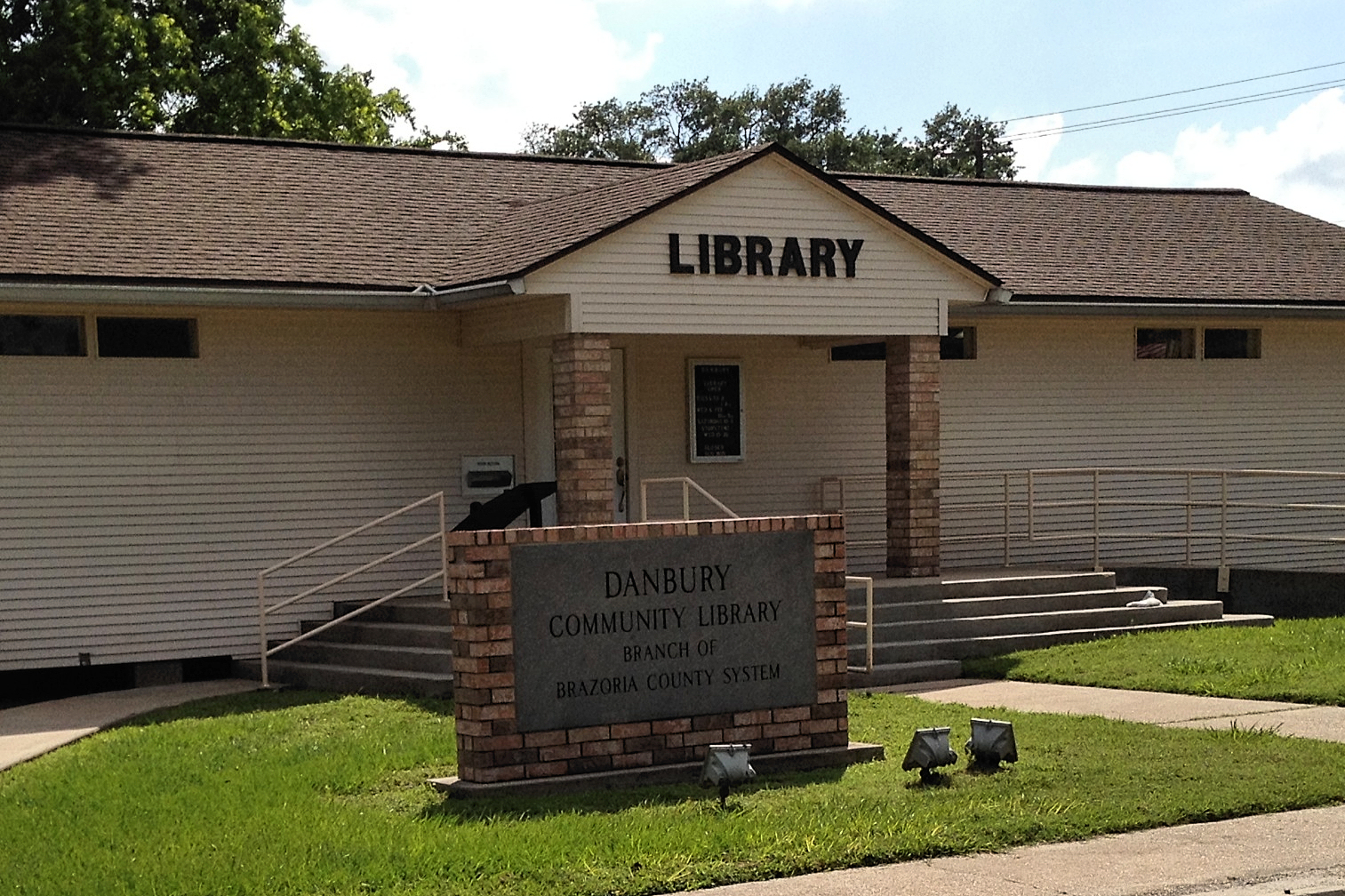
Danbury Community Library

The Texas Legislature designated Danbury ISD as being in the Alvin Community College zone.

== See also ==
- List of municipalities in Texas
