= Danbury High School (Texas) =

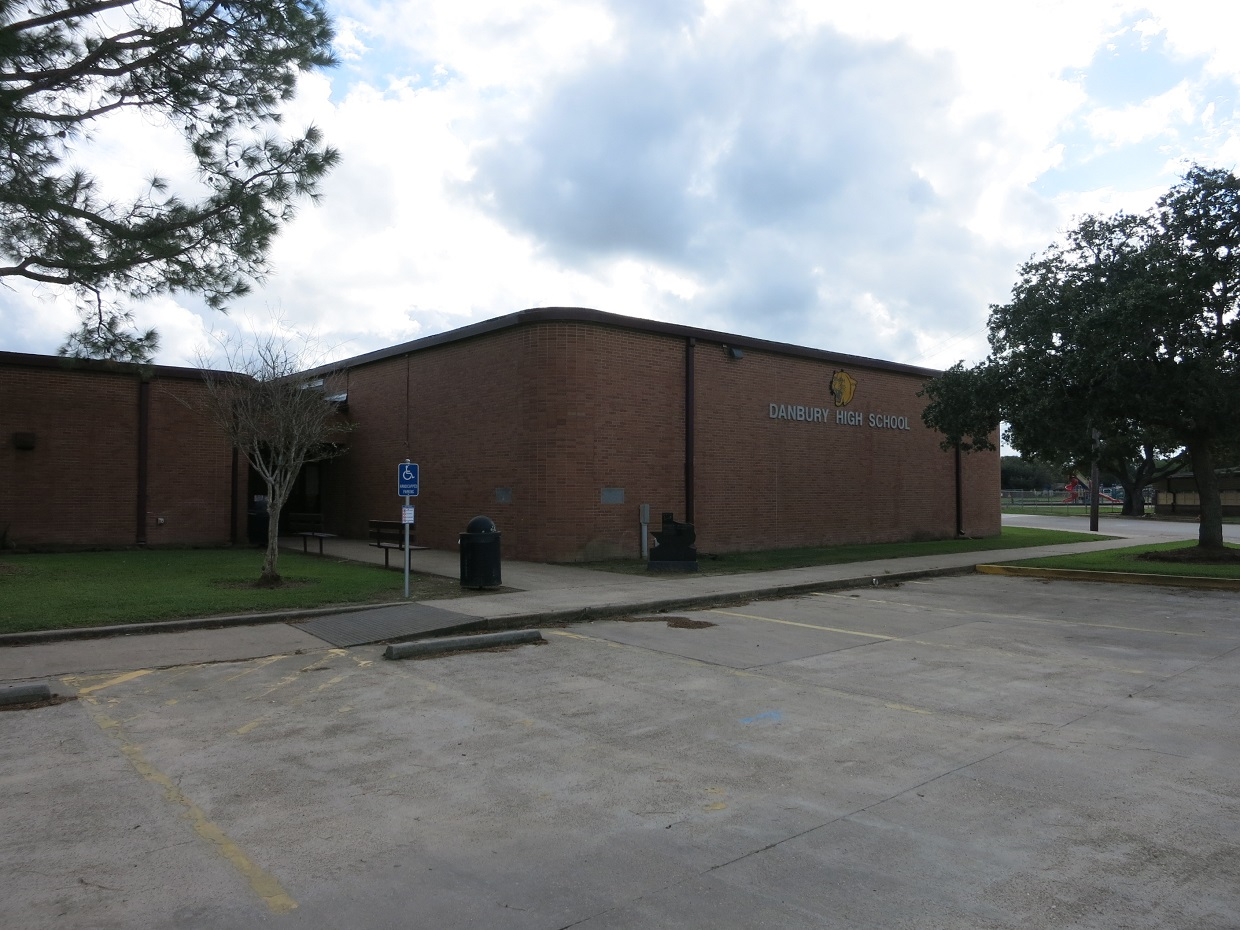

Location
- 5611 Panther Drive; Danbury, Texas 77534; United States; 29.2242°N 95.3421°W

Information
- Type: Public
- Motto: Strive for greatness to achieve success!
- Locale: Rural
- School district: Danbury Independent School District
- NCES District ID: 4816290
- Educational authority: Texas Education Agency
- Superintendent: Mike Homann
- CEEB code: 441840
- NCES School ID: 481629001393
- Principal: Kimberly Hickl
- Teaching staff: 20.01 (on an FTE basis)
- Grades: 9–12
- Gender: Coeducational
- Enrollment: 220 (2024-2025)
  - Grade 9: 51
  - Grade 10: 61
  - Grade 11: 56
  - Grade 12: 52
- Student to teacher ratio: 10.99
- Colors: Black & Vegas Gold
- Athletics conference: UIL Class 2A
- Mascot: Panther
- Team name: Panthers/Lady Panthers
- Website: www.danburyisd.org/apps/pages/index.jsp?uREC_ID=1588113&type=d&pREC_ID=1714535

Danbury High School is a public high school located in the city of Danbury, Texas, United States. The school is classified as a 2A school by the UIL. It is part of the Danbury Independent School District located in east central Brazoria County. For the 2024-2025 school year, the school was given a "B" by the Texas Education Agency.

== Athletics ==
The Danbury Panthers compete in these sports -

- Baseball
- Basketball
- Cross Country
- Football
- Golf
- Powerlifting
- Softball
- Tennis
- Track and Field
- Volleyball

The school has a junior varsity and varsity cheerleading team and a marching band. The track around the football field was recently repaired/resurfaced, and a new weight room has been added as well.

=== State titles ===
- Baseball
  - 2009(2A)
- Softball
  - 2004(2A), 2011(2A)
- One Act Play
  - 1967(B)

==== State finalist ====
- Boys Basketball
  - 2001(2A)

State Semi-finalists: Softball - 2012(2A), 2019(3A)
