= List of University Interscholastic League events =

The University Interscholastic League, the main governing body for academic, athletic, and music competition among public schools in the U.S. state of Texas, sanctions many events for students in grades 2 to 12.

Competition in grades 2–8 is limited to district only. Competition in grades 9–12 advances (in most cases) from district to region to state.

In addition to individual and team awards in the separate contest events, schools are also eligible to win an overall district academic championship award and/or an overall district spring meet sweepstakes award (the latter combines the results of the academic events with the results of singles tennis, doubles tennis, mixed doubles tennis, individual track and field events, relay track events, and team golf). Generally, points are awarded to each school for individuals placing first through sixth place and for teams placing first or second, plus additional points for certain academic contests. Overall academic championship awards are also given at the regional and state level using the same point system.

Schools also compete for the Lone Star Cup, which is awarded to one school statewide in each conference. Points for the Lone Star Cup are awarded in a different manner than for the academic or spring meet championship awards described above and include results of state-level academic, athletic, and music competitions.

For fine arts and journalism contests, the UIL has not adopted an "amateur rule.” Thus, students who have acted or performed professionally or who have written for a local newspaper may still compete in UIL-sanctioned contests provided they are otherwise eligible.

== Academic events ==
=== High school ===
==== Events ====
Events below have both team and individual components unless specifically noted otherwise. Sanctioned high school academic events are:

- Accounting
- Animation (can be done individually or with a team)
  - Digital Animation
  - Traditional Animation
- Calculator Applications
- Computer Applications (individual competition only)
- Computer Science
- Current Issues and Events
- Film (can be done individually or with a team)
  - Documentary
  - Narrative
- Literary Criticism
- Mathematics
- Number Sense
- Ready Writing (individual competition only)
- Science
- Social Studies
- Spelling and Vocabulary
- Speech (an award is given to the top overall school in speech events; the award does not qualify students for advancement)
  - Cross-Examination Team Debate (team competition only)
  - Lincoln-Douglas Debate (individual competition only)
  - Congressional Debate (individual competition only)
  - Extemporaneous Informative Speaking (individual competition only)
  - Extemporaneous Persuasive Speaking (individual competition only)
  - Poetry Interpretation (individual competition only)
  - Prose Interpretation (individual competition only)
- Journalism (an award is given to the top overall school in journalism events; the award does not qualify students for advancement)
  - Editorial Writing (individual competition only)
  - Feature Writing (individual competition only)
  - Headline Writing (individual competition only)
  - News Writing (individual competition only)
- One-Act Play (team competition plus individual awards that do not lead to advancement) (List of Previous Texas UIL One Act Play Winners)

==== Entry limitations ====
Each UIL member school is allowed to enter between 3 and 6 students in most events, depending on the specific rules for the event. Schools may enter up to three two-member teams in Cross-Examination Team Debate, except that if a school's UIL district has less than eight teams entered it may enter a fourth team. One-Act Plays may have up to 15 cast members plus 5 crew members. Each school may enter one play for competition, except that if a school's UIL district has three or less plays entered each school in that district may be allowed to enter a second play.

==== Competition format ====
Academic events at the high school level are held in the spring. Schools compete within the same conference as in athletics and marching band.

There is no division of competition by grade level in high school academic events; all students in grades 9–12 that compete in a particular event compete against each other. Advancement is from district to region to state except in Cross-Examination Team Debate, where advancement is directly from district to state, and in One-Act Play, where advancement is from district to area to region to state. Furthermore, districts with eight or more competing schools may subdivide into zones and hold One-Act Play competitions in each zone in order to select schools to advance to the district level.

Except for Cross-Examination Team Debate and One-Act Play, the top three individuals and all members of the first place team (for events with team components) are certified to advance to the next level of competition. The UIL has also adopted a "wild card" system for those events with team components, which is made possible since all test materials are uniform throughout the state. Under the wild card system, the highest scoring second place team from among all districts in each region will advance to the region meet, and the highest scoring second place team from all four regions in each conference will advanced to the state meet. In the Science competition, in addition to the top three individuals and top team, the top scorers in each of the three subject areas of biology, chemistry, and physics also advance to the next level of competition. All students who advance to the next level of competition are eligible to earn individual medals, even if they advanced as part of a team or as one of the Science top subject area scorers.

In Cross-Examination Team Debate, the first and second place teams in each district advance directly to state, though additional qualification criteria must be met depending on the number of teams entered and the number of schools represented in the district meet. In One-Act Play, two unranked plays from each level of competition are selected to advance with plays only being ranked at the state meet.

In order to determine the school with the best overall school in a conference, points are awarded to the top six finishers and top two teams. Certain events also have bonus points, and in many cases an event will have a cap to the maximum number of points a school can be awarded.

=== Elementary ===
==== Events ====
Each event is offered for different grade levels and has divisions as noted. Sanctioned elementary and junior high school academic events are:

- Art (two divisions for grades 4–6 and 7–8)
- Calculator Applications (one division for grades 6–8)
- Chess Problem Solving (grades 2–8)
- Creative Writing (one division for grade 2 only)
- Dictionary Skills (two divisions for grades 5–6 and 7–8)
- Editorial Writing (one division for grades 7–8)
- Impromptu Speaking (one division for grades 6–8)
- Listening (two divisions for grades 5–6 and 7–8)
- Maps, Graphs & Charts (two divisions for grades 5–6 and 7–8)
- Mathematics (one division for grades 6–8)
- Modern Oratory (one division for grades 6–8)
- Music Memory (two divisions for grades 3–4 and 5–6)
- Number Sense (two divisions for grades 4–6 and 7–8)
- One-Act Play (one division for grades 6–8)
- Oral Reading (two divisions for grades 4–6 and 7–9)
- Ready Writing (three divisions for grades 3–4, 5–6, and 7–8)
- Science I and II (grades 7 and 8, respectively)
- Social Studies (two divisions for grades 5–6 and 7–8)
- Spelling (three divisions for grades 3–4, 5–6, and 7–8)
- Storytelling (one division for grades 2–3)

==== Entry limitations ====
Each UIL member school may enter between 3 and 5 students in each division of each event, depending on the specific rules for the event. One-Act Play rules and entry guidelines for junior high are commensurate with those for high school.

==== Competition format ====
Elementary and junior high school district academic meets may be held in either the fall or the spring, but not both. Elementary and junior high students competing in academic events cannot advance beyond the district level. Events that are available for four or more grade levels are divided into two or three divisions based on grade level, though district executive committees may create separate divisions for each grade level if they wish. Rules allow students to compete in a division for older students if they wish. Science I is for 7th-graders and Science II is for 8th-graders; while students in 6th grade may enter Science I and students in 7th grade may enter Science II, no student can compete in Science I or II for more than one year.

== Athletic events ==
=== Sports ===
Sanctioned sports are:

- Baseball (co-ed, though traditionally for boys)
- Basketball (boys' and girls')
- Cross Country (boys' and girls', team and individual)
- Football (co-ed, though traditionally for boys)
- Six-Man Football (co-ed, though traditionally for boys; only available for Conference A schools with enrollments below a defined level)
- Golf (boys' and girls', team and individual)
- Soccer (boys' and girls'; Conferences AAAA, AAAAA, and AAAAAA only)
- Softball (girls' only)
- Swimming and Diving (boys' and girls', team and individual; Conferences AAAA, AAAAA, and AAAAAA only)
- Team Tennis (boys' and girls' combined; Conferences AAAA, AAAAA, and AAAAAA only)
- Tennis (boys' and girls' singles and doubles, plus mixed doubles)
- Track and Field (boys' and girls', team and individual)
- Volleyball (girls' only)
- Water Polo (boys' and girls'; Conference AAAAAA only)
- Wrestling (boys' and girls', individual only; Conferences AAAA, AAAAA, and AAAAAA only)

In schools that offer only boys' basketball and/or boys' soccer with no corresponding girls' teams, girls may participate on the boys' teams. Girls may also participate in baseball but may not compete in both baseball and softball in the same season. Conference A schools that are eligible to play six-man football may instead choose to play traditional 11-man football, but schools may not compete in both sports and they must play the same sport for both years of the district alignment period.

Cross country, football, six-man football, team tennis, and volleyball compete during the fall semester. Basketball overlaps both the fall and spring semesters. Baseball, golf, soccer, softball, swimming and diving, tennis, track and field, and wrestling compete during the spring semester.

=== Competition format ===
UIL athletic competition is held in grades 7–12.

At the junior high level (grades 7–8), there is no athletic competition beyond the district level. Sixth grade students may only compete in athletics if they will be too old the following year to compete on a seventh-grade team or if a junior high school has too few seventh- and eighth-grade students to field a combined team. With only a few exceptions due to disability, sixth-graders are not allowed to compete in individual sports.

High school team sports compete at freshman, junior varsity, and varsity levels, with only varsity teams being eligible for advancement to the playoffs beyond the district level. Students may only compete in team and individual sports at the high school varsity level for four years and must be under the age of 19, though the age restriction may be waived by state-level officers in certain circumstances. In addition, varsity athletes must adhere to a whole host of other rules that encompass parent residence, amateur status, non-recruitment, and steroid testing.

In football, six-man football, volleyball, basketball, soccer, baseball, and softball, teams compete for the state championship through a playoff system, with each district entitled to 2–4 playoff representatives depending on the sport and conference (within each sport and conference, every district has equal representation). In cross country, golf, swimming and diving, team tennis, tennis, track and field, and wrestling, students and teams compete in meets/tournaments advancing from district to region to state.

== Music events ==
=== Events ===
Sanctioned music events are:

- Marching band (List of Texas UIL State Marching Band Competition Winners)
- Solo and Small Ensemble Performance (for band, orchestra, choir, and twirling)
- Medium Ensemble Performance (for band, orchestra, choir, and mariachi)
- Concert Performance (for band, orchestra, and choir)
- Sightreading (for band, orchestra, and choir)
- Music Theory

=== Entry limitations ===
Marching Band, Concert Performance, and Sightreading are open to both high school and junior high school groups, though junior high schools cannot advance beyond the region level in Marching Band. Solo and ensemble competition is only offered at the high school level, though there are some circumstances in which seventh and eighth grade students may compete in ensembles. The Music Theory competition is only open to students in grades 9–12.

Sightreading is a mandatory competition for any school that has a contestant in regional competition, and all contestants representing the school at region must compete in a sightreading competition, though the school can have two groups and designate one group as "non-varsity" (which means that they will sight read a different piece).

=== Competition format ===
The basic geographic groupings for music competitions are called regions instead of districts. Unlike academic and athletic districts, which only contain schools of a single conference, music regions contain schools of all sizes. This is because competitions in most of the music events award ratings to schools and students based on their levels of performance instead of ranking schools or students against one another, so it is not necessary to hold separate contests for the different conferences. The exception is in marching band, where for advancement purposes schools compete against schools in the same conference, and the 28 regions are grouped into five to seven areas (depending on the conference). Sightreading also uses different conferences, but solely for the purpose of having all schools in a conference read the same piece.

Marching band contests are held annually in the fall, and all other music contests are held in the spring. The Music Theory competition is held only in conjunction with the Texas State Solo & Ensemble Contest; there is no region-level competition and is open to any and all students (i.e., the student is not required to advance from region in his/her musical event, or even to have participated for the matter).

The rating scale used in UIL music events is as follows:

- Division I (Superior). A superior performance for the event and the class of participants being judged; worthy of the distinction of being recognized as a first-place winner.
- Division II (Excellent). An unusual performance in many respects but not worthy of the highest rating due to minor defects in performance or ineffective interpretation. A performance of distinctive quality.
- Division III (Average). An average performance, but not outstanding, showing accomplishment and marked promise, but lacking in one or more essential qualities.
- Division IV (Below Average). A below average performance not worthy of higher rating because of basic weaknesses in most of the fundamental factors.
- Division V (Poor). Much room for improvement. The director should check his or her methods, instrumentation, etc. with those of more mature organizations.

=== Advancement ===
Any marching band from any conference may advance from region to area to state, with the exception of military bands. Any marching band that earns a Division I rating at the region competition qualifies to advance. In the event that less than two bands in a conference earn a Division I rating at the region competition, the judging panel will select two bands from that conference to advance. At the area competition, bands are ranked against the other bands in their own conferences and the top bands from each area advance to the state competition. The exact number bands that will advance from area to state is dependent on the number competing bands in each conference.

Students who earn a Division I rating at the region Solo-Small Ensemble contest may advance to the Texas State Solo & Ensemble Contest. In almost all cases, a solo must have been performed by memory at the region competition to qualify for advancement, though some virtuosic instrumental solos have been identified that may be performed with music and still qualify to advance. Because the Music Theory competition is held only in conjunction with this state level event, advancement from the region level is not required to compete in Music Theory.

There is no competition beyond the region level for Concert Performance, Sight Reading, or Medium Ensemble Performance. However, a state-level Wind Ensemble Festival is held each spring in which all participating wind ensembles (i.e., concert bands) must have earned a Division I rating in Concert Performance at the region competition. The Wind Ensemble Festival is an educational rather than a competitive event.

=== State marching band contest ===
Like Texas High School Football, Texas High School Band and Band Competitions are particularly competitive. Public School extra-curricular activities, which includes marching band, are governed by the University Interscholastic League, or UIL. UIL holds a series of contests every fall in order to determine the state champion for High School Marching Bands. The state is divided up into 6 categories for high schools, 1A to 6A. Classes 1A, 2A, 3A, and 5A have the UIL State marching contest on odd numbered years, 4A and 6A have it on even numbered years.

As Texas high school marching bands continue to improve year after year, the standards of excellence have increased as well. Five Texas high school bands have won the notable Bands of America Grand National Championship: Spring HS (1993), Westfield HS (2003), LD Bell HS (2007), The Woodlands HS (2013) and Vandegrift HS (2019).

(Note: Almost all of the marching bands that were originally in Class 5A high schools from 1980 to 2012 are now in Class 6A due to the addition of a new 6A Conference in 2013.)

Texas 6A UIL State Marching Band Champions (originally 5A from 1980 to 2012)

- 1980 - Crockett High School (Austin)
- 1981 - Crockett High School (Austin)
- 1982 - Permian High School (Odessa)
- 1983 - J. W. Nixon High School (Laredo)
- 1984 - MacArthur High School (San Antonio)
- 1985 - MacArthur High School (San Antonio)
- 1986 - Duncanville High School
- 1987 - Westfield High School (Houston)
- 1988 - Westfield High School (Houston)
- 1989 - Westfield High School (Houston)
- 1990 - Duncanville High School
- 1992 - Spring High School
- 1994 - Spring High School
- 1996 - Westfield High School (Houston)
- 1998 - Westfield High School (Houston)
- 2000 - L.D. Bell High School (Hurst)
- 2002 - Duncanville High School
- 2004 - L.D. Bell High School (Hurst)
- 2006 - Marcus High School (Flower Mound)
- 2008 - Marcus High School (Flower Mound)
- 2010 - Marcus High School (Flower Mound)
- 2012 - Marcus High School (Flower Mound)
- 2014 - Marcus High School (Flower Mound)
- 2016 - Flower Mound High School (Flower Mound)
- 2018 - Vista Ridge High School (Cedar Park)
- 2020 - Claudia Taylor Johnson High School (San Antonio)
- 2021 - Hebron High School (Carrolton)
- 2022 - Vandegrift High School (Austin)
- 2023 - Vandegrift High School (Austin)
