= IDEA Frontier =

IDEA Frontier Academy and College Preparatory

Location
- 2800 S. Dakota Ave. Brownsville, Texas 78521; United States; 25°53′09″N 97°25′29″W

Information
- Type: Charter; Primary; Secondary
- Motto: No Excuses!
- Founded: 2006
- School district: IDEA Public Schools
- Principal: Jessica Hinojosa; Dora Cordova
- Faculty: 49
- Grades: K-12
- Gender: Co-educational
- Enrollment: 752
- Campus: Rural
- Colors: Red and Yellow
- Mascot: Chargers
- Website: IDEA Frontier

IDEA Frontier (commonly referred to as Frontier) is an independently managed charter school within the IDEA Public Schools system in the Rio Grande Valley in deep South Texas, United States. It is located in Brownsville and was founded in 2006.

The school is known for its high performance in national high school rankings, mandatory Advanced Placement testing, and high graduation rates. The U.S. News & World Report named it in the top 100 American high schools for 2013–2026.

== History ==
The IDEA Frontier campus was founded in 2006 under principals Ernesto Cantú (of the secondary school) and Roberta Harris (of the primary school). The school held classes at Amigoland Mall for its first two years, after which the campus moved to its current Dakota Avenue location. Frontier graduated its first senior class in 2011. The campus currently includes six buildings, with plans to add a seventh that will feature a new gymnasium.

== Academics ==
IDEA Frontier offers Advanced Placement and dual-credit courses (through the University of Texas at Austin system). Since becoming a fully scaled school, IDEA Frontier has successfully sent all of its graduating seniors to colleges and universities.

== Principals and teachers ==
Teach for America has served IDEA Frontier and other IDEA campuses in recruiting new teachers.

The school is divided into two academic levels: Academy (grades K-5) and College Preparatory (grades 6-12). The current College Preparatory principal is Virginia Callaway. Dora Cordova has replaced Dora Villegas as the principal of the Academy. Most teachers at IDEA Frontier are members of the Teach for America program, a non-profit organization that recruits teachers for public schools.

According to the Houston Association of Realtors (HAR), the average teacher experience at this school is 2.8 years, while the average tenure for teachers is 2.1 years. The faculty is roughly 60% female and 40% male.

=== Teacher awards ===
Senior Vice President of Schools Michael Hardy won the Texas State Educator awards through H-E-B in the Rising Star Secondary Category, winning a $5,000 prize for his campus and another $5,000 for himself. Two years prior, former assistant principal Marco Lopez was nominated for the award as well.

In 2013, AP Biology teacher Rachel Willcutts became a national finalist for the Shell Lab Science Challenge, a contest created by Shell Oil Company and the National Science Teachers Association. Willcutts, along with three other finalists, received a laboratory grant which included a $3,000 cash grant, $3,000-worth of donated lab equipment, and $1,000 in NSTA prizes.

== Facilities ==
The school is located at the intersection of Dakota and Dockberry in Brownsville, Texas. During its first two years, all classes were held in portable buildings; the first permanent buildings were completed for Fall 2008. There are now six permanent buildings at IDEA Frontier. The school did suspend its pre-kindergarten program in 2012, but came back after a short period of time

== Students ==
During the fall semester the school accepts applications from prospective students for the following year. If the school receives more applications than the number of places available then a lottery is held, which determines which applicants will be admitted to the school. Students selected are required to attend testing and registration events to officially enroll at the school, along with a Welcome to IDEA event explaining the expectations and norms the school expects each student to follow. Students not selected in the lottery are added to a wait-list for later openings.

In the 2015–2016 school year there were 752 students enrolled in the College Preparatory campus, with much of the student body being of Hispanic or Latino ethnicity. The student population was 1% Asian/Pacific Islander, 0% Black, 95% Hispanic, 3% White and 0.3% Two or More Races. The school's gender makeup was 49% boys and 51% girls. The average classroom size at Frontier is below the national average, with 15 students per teacher (compared to the national average of 21.6 students per teacher).

== Awards and recognition ==
=== State and local awards ===
The school was named to the TBEC Honor Roll for two consecutive years in 2010 and 2011. Among more than 8,000 Texas public schools, fewer than 4 percent receive this recognition by the Texas Business and Education Coalition. The TBEC Honor Roll is Texas’ most prestigious award for public schools, requiring three years of consistently high performance in all subjects compared to other schools serving similar student populations. TBEC Honor Roll schools have the highest percentage of students performing at the state's most rigorous standard — commended — in all subjects on the Texas Assessment of Knowledge and Skills.

IDEA Frontier College Preparatory earned the rating of Recognized from the Texas Education Agency for the 2007–2008 and 2008–2009 academic years and Exemplary for the 2009–2010 and 2010–2011 academic years. In 2015, the Texas Education Agency also awarded IDEA Frontier all seven distinctions for Academic Achievement in Reading/English Language Arts, Mathematics, Science, and Social Studies, as well as Top 25 Percent: Student Progress and Closing Performance Gaps. The school was also awarded a distinction in Postsecondary Readiness. Of all schools in the state of Texas, only 153 received this honor. This ranks the school in the top 1 percent of their state.

In 2012, the school was inducted into the Texas Honors Circle, a prestigious honor that schools with high academic performance and a well-managed budget attain. IDEA Frontier ranked in the four percent of all schools who met the criteria. The Texas Comptroller of Public Accounts measures these rankings using a FAST (Financial Allocation Study for Texas) rating system, ranging from one to five stars. The average of a school's academic progress percentile and spending index determine the ranking.

The Texas Charter Schools Association recognized IDEA Frontier College Preparatory for showing consistency in high student performance and growth in 2013. Only 27 schools received this honor, while only 11 school districts in the state of Texas were mentioned. The organization tracks charter schools around the state and compare the level of proficiency they perform for three years.

Children at Risk, a non-profit organization that aims to improve the quality of life for children through strategic research, public policy analysis, education, collaboration, and advocacy ranked Frontier as the 38th best school in Texas, achieving the highest rating of A+. The organization assess their rankings based on student performance on state exams in reading and math, the annual student progress on those tests and the relative scores of low-income students.

=== National rankings ===
The school has consistently ranked in the top 1 percent of high schools in the United States. According to the U.S News & World Report, the school has been present in their national, state, and charter rankings for four consecutive years. Among more than 21,000 high schools in America, the school was ranked 60th nationally and 11th in the state of Texas for the 2013 year. The school ranked 85 nationally and 27 statewide in 2014, earning a gold medal for being a top performer in the College Readiness Index. The following year, the school ranked as the 49th best high school in America and the 8th best in the state of Texas. For the 2016 rankings, the school ranked as the 79th best performing school in the country, the 27th best charter school in America and the 15th best in the state. The rankings for the annual report are based on a College Readiness Index, the percentage of students who AP tested and passed, as well as proficiency in Mathematics and English.

IDEA Frontier, as well as seven other IDEA campuses, made their second appearance in Jay Mathews article, America's Most Challenging High Schools, published by The Washington Post. Frontier made its first appearance in the list in 2015, ranking 22 in the nation and 8th in the state of Texas. The following year, the school moved up several spots to rank as the 15th most challenging school in the country and the 5th most challenging in the state of Texas. The index given to each school is based on the number of college level exams given at the school divided by the number of graduates the school has that year. The report also takes into account students who are under the reduced-lunch program.

American publishing and education company, Scholastic, ranked the school as 15th in the nation for the Scholastic Summer Challenge, a program designed to encourage students to read during the summer in order to prevent the "summer slide", a loss of academic skills and knowledge over the course of a summer vacation. The school also placed 5th in the state of Texas and 1st in the South Texas region. IDEA Frontier read a total of 873,380 minutes, placing them in Scholastic’s Book of World Records for the 2013 issue.

=== Other recognition ===
The International Baccalaureate Organization (IBO) announced its authorization of IDEA Frontier as an International Baccalaureate World School in 2016. Starting in 2017, the school will include IB courses, which are arguably more rigorous and demanding than AP classes. This recognition is ideal to the school since it is the second IDEA campus, after Donna and the only school in Cameron county that will offer IB courses. Frontier will be one of less than 900 schools in the nation offering IB courses.

The school, along with two other IDEA campuses, was recognized by the U.S. Department of Agriculture for demonstrating excellence in nutrition and physical activity. IDEA Frontier received the highest recognition, receiving a Gold award of Distinction for HUSSC or the Healthier US School Challenge, with both Academy and College Preparatory receiving this honor.

== Part of IDEA Public Schools ==
IDEA Frontier is a charter school operated by the IDEA Public Schools System. IDEA was founded in 2000 by Tom Torkelson and JoAnn Gama, Teach For America corps members dedicated to making sure all underserved students can go to college.

=== System ===
All schools in the IDEA system are composed of two campuses, an Academy and a College Preparatory school. The Academy is the school for primary grades, generally kindergarten to fifth grade. The College Prep is a secondary school, a combination of middle school and high school, with grades six to twelve. Starting with College Preparatory classes, students have different teachers for different subjects, as in a traditional school system.

Selection of students is initially carried out by lottery; thereafter, students are taken from the waiting list, first-come, first-served. There is no tuition to attend the schools; however, some schools have an activity fee to help cover certain events, such as field trips or experiments. This fee may be made in payments and may be waived for families with financial limitations.

Each campus requires uniforms for each student. The standard uniform generally consists of a polo with the IDEA logo and campus name, khaki or navy pants or shorts, a belt, and tennis shoes and socks appropriate for the pants worn. On designated days, a "college uniform" may be worn, consisting of jeans and a T-shirt displaying a large, visible logo from a college or university of the student's choice.

=== Field lessons ===
Students at IDEA Frontier attend college "field lessons", which are educational field trips to locations around the United States. Locations include cities such as Chicago, Washington, D.C., New York City, and local cities such as Dallas, Houston, Austin, and San Antonio. Trips usually last around a day to at most a week. Starting as early as the third grade, students will visit many universities by the time they complete their senior year. This is a unique advantage to them as many will have garnered enough information about what college is suitable for them. There are currently no field lessons for seniors, due to the fact that college applications are due within the end of their first semester.

The purpose of field lessons is to give students a learning experience about the culture of universities and the way classes function. Aside from visiting universities, students also visit museums and historical sites to educate them about other cultures and city life away from their hometown.

== Curriculum ==
IDEA Frontier requires the Texas Recommended Plan as described by the Texas Education Agency (TEA). The school also offers the Texas Distinguished Program, which is more demanding by requiring Pre-AP and AP courses. The table below compares the two programs – both programs require 26 credits:

Comparison of Distinguished Achievement Programs
Area of Study	Required Credits under Texas Recommended Plan	Required Credits under Texas Distinguished Program
English 4 credits required	English 1, English 2, English 3, AP English Language and Composition	English 1, English 2, AP English Language and Composition, AP English Literature and Composition
Math 4 credits required	Must include Algebra 1, Geometry, Algebra 2, Pre-Calculus	Must include Geometry, Algebra 2, Pre-Calculus, AP Calculus AB or AP Statistics
Social Studies 3 credits required	World Geography, AP World History or World History, AP American History or American History, AP U.S. Government and AP Microeconomics or U.S. Government and Economics (one semester)	World Geography, AP World History or World History, AP American History or American History, AP U.S. Government and AP Microeconomics or U.S. Government and Economics (one semester)
Science 4 credits required	Must include Biology, Chemistry, Physics, AP Science or other approved science course	Must include Biology, Chemistry, Physics, AP Science or other approved science course
Foreign Language 3 credits required	Spanish I, II, AP Spanish Language or Spanish III, AP Spanish Literature or AP Spanish Language	Spanish I, II, AP Spanish Language and Composition or Spanish III, AP Spanish Literature or AP Spanish Language
Fine Arts 1 credit required	1 credit (Art, Dance, Music, or Theatre)	1 credit (Art, Dance, Music, or Theatre)
Physical Education 1 credits required	1 credit (2 seasons of a sport= 1/2 credit; 3 seasons of a sport= 1 credit)	1 credit (2 seasons of a sport= 1/2 credit; 3 seasons of a sport= 1 credit)
Health 0.5 credit required	0.5 credit	0.5 credit
Speech 0.5 credit required	0.5 credit	0.5 credit
Electives 3 credits required	AVID I, II, III, and IV or other IDEA approved electives	AVID I, II, III, and IV or other IDEA approved electives

== Extracurricular activities ==
=== UIL competitions ===
IDEA Frontier students are active in District 32-2A sports such as Cross Country and Track and Field. The school won their district title for two consecutive years and went to the state competition in 2015, making it to 10th place in the finals.

Aside from sports, students also participate in many academic teams such as: Calculator Applications, Current Issues and Events, Headline Writing and Number Sense. Students perform well in these competitions, usually ranking in top positions at these events. The One-Act Play has performed at their district meets for several years, usually placing at top positions. In 2016, the team placed first in their district division.

== See also ==
- IDEA Public Schools
- Teach For America
- Charter school
