= Lindsay High School (Texas) =

Location
- 495 6th Street; Lindsay, Texas 76250; United States; 33.6372°N 97.2284°W

Information
- School type: Public high school
- School district: Lindsay Independent School District
- Principal: Matt Brennan
- Staff: 20.62 (on an FTE basis)
- Grades: 7-12
- Enrollment: 213 (2023-2024)
- Student to teacher ratio: 10.33
- Colors: Black & White
- Athletics conference: UIL Class AA
- Mascot: Knight/Lady Knight
- Yearbook: The Knight
- Website: Lindsay High School

Lindsay High School or Lindsay Secondary School is a public high school located in Lindsay, Texas, in Cooke County (USA) and classified as a 2A school by the UIL. It is a part of the Lindsay Independent School District located in west central Cooke County. In 2015, the school was rated "Met Standard" by the Texas Education Agency.

== Achievements ==
- Texas Lone Star Cup Champions
  - 2006(1A), 2007(1A), 2008(1A), 2009(1A), 2011(1A), 2012(1A)

== Academics ==
- UIL Academic Meet Champions
  - 1992(1A), 1993(1A), 1994(1A), 1995(1A), 1998(2A), 1999(1A), 2001(1A), 2003(1A), 2004(1A), 2005(1A), 2007(1A), 2008(1A), 2009(1A), 2010(1A)

The 14 overall academic titles is the most of any high school in Texas in any classification. Lindsay is the only school to score more than 200 points at the UIL State Academic Meet; it has done so three times (274 points in 2005, 263 points in 2007, and 280 points in 2009). It has also held the last three records for most overall points at the state meet by any school (187 points in 2001, 274 in 2005, 280 in 2009). The 280 points in 2009 equaled the combined total of the next five highest placing schools in Class A, and the margin between first place Lindsay and the second place Class A finisher was 204 points, a larger point total than the winning scores of any of the other conference winners.

- Calculator Applications:
  - Individual – 2008, 2009
  - Team – 2009
- Computer Applications – 1999 (this is an individual event only)
- Current Issues and Events:
  - Individual – 2001, 2002
  - Team – 1992, 1994, 1995 (co-champion), 1996, 2001, 2002, 2003
- Journalism Events (all events are individual events only; however, beginning in 2004 UIL began to recognize the school with the best overall performance in all Journalism events):
  - Editorial Writing – 2001, 2007
  - Headline Writing – 1987, 2002
  - News Writing – 1992, 1999
  - Overall Team Award – 2007
- Literary Criticism:
  - Individual – 1996, 2000, 2005
  - Team – 1995, 1996, 1997, 2002, 2003
- Mathematics:
  - Individual – 2007, 2008, 2009, 2010
  - Team – 1994, 2005, 2008, 2009, 2010
- Number Sense:
  - Individual – 2005, 2008, 2009, 2010
  - Team – 2004, 2005, 2007, 2008, 2009, 2010
- Ready Writing – 1968, 1996
- Science:
  - Individual (overall) – 1982, 1984, 1987, 1988, 1993, 1994
  - Individual (biology) – 1987, 1988, 1992, 1993, 1994
  - Individual (chemistry) – 1987, 1994, 1995, 2009
  - Individual (physics) – 1988, 1992, 1993, 1994
  - Team – 1993, 1994, 1995, 1999, 2009
- Shorthand – 1978, 1980, 1981 (now discontinued, was an individual event only)
- Social Studies:
  - Individual – 2010
  - Team – 2005
- Speech Events (all events are individual events except for Cross-Examination Debate; however, beginning in 2004 UIL began to recognize the school with the best overall performance in all Speech events):
  - Cross-Examination Team Debate – 1994, 1996, 1999
  - Lincoln-Douglas Debate – 1992, 2007
  - Extemporaneous Informative Speaking – 1995, 2006, 2007, 2008, 2009
  - Persuasive Speaking – 1974 (boys)
  - Poetry Interpretation – 2007
  - Prose Interpretation – 2004, 2007
  - Overall Team Award – 2005, 2007, 2008, 2009
- Spelling and Vocabulary:
  - Individual – 1980, 1992, 2005
  - Team – 1992, 2002, 2005, 2006, 2007, 2010
  - Prior to the 1992-1993 school year the event was known as Spelling and Plain Writing.
- One Act Play
  - 1994(1A), 2003(1A), 2004(1A), 2005(1A), 2007(1A), 2009(1A)

== Athletics ==
The Lindsay Knights compete in the following sports:

- Baseball
- Basketball
- Cross Country
- Football
- Golf
- Softball
- Tennis
- Track and Field
- Volleyball

=== State Titles ===
- Girls Basketball -
  - 2007(1A/D1)
- Girls Cross Country -
  - 2007(1A)
- Boys Track -
  - 2005(1A), 2010(1A)
- Girls Track -
  - 2007(1A)
- Boys Golf -
  - 2022(2A), 2023(2A)
- Volleyball
  - 2026(2A/D2)
