= Lindsay High School =

Lindsay High School may refer to:

- Lindsay High School (Texas), in Lindsay, Texas
- Lindsay High School (California), in Lindsay, California
- Lindsay High School (Oklahoma), in Lindsay, Oklahoma
