= Lindsay Independent School District =

School district in Texas

Location
- Lindsay, TX ESC Region 11 USA

District information
- Type: Public
- Grades: Pre-K through 12
- Superintendent: Steve Cope

Students and staff
- Students: 485
- Athletic conference: UIL Class 2A
- District mascot: Knight
- Colors: Black, and White

Other information

Lindsay Independent School District (LISD) is a public school district based in Lindsay, Texas (USA).

Lindsay ISD has a strong record of success in all fields, as evidenced by the Texas Education Agency accountability ratings system. Since the system was implemented during the 1993–1994 school year, Lindsay ISD has never been rated lower than Recognized (one of a handful of schools with such a distinction), having earned the Exemplary rating in 1997, 1998, 1999, 2000, 2001, 2002, 2003, 2007, and 2009 and the Recognized rating in 1994, 1995, 1996, 2004, 2005, 2006, and 2008. Further, Lindsay High School is a four-time Class A Lone Star Cup champion and 14-time UIL Academic Meet overall champion (twice in Class AA and 12 times in Class A), and the defending Class A champion in the UIL Academic Meet.

In 2009, the school district was rated "recognized" by the Texas Education Agency.

Circa 2007, most of the students were German American and Roman Catholic. In the 2006–2007 school year, the district had 512 students.

== Schools ==
- Lindsay Elementary (K-6)
- Lindsay Secondary (7–12)
