= IDEA Public Schools =

Texas-based charter school operator

IDEA Public Schools, Inc.
- Texas

District information
- Type: Organization that runs charter schools
- Grades: KG - 12
- Established: 2000; 26 years ago
- CEO and Superintendent: Dr. Jeffrey Cottrill
- Schools: 123
- NCES District ID: 4800211
- District ID: TX-108807

Students and staff
- Students: 76,819
- Teachers: 8,946.64 (FTE) (2021–22)
- Student–teacher ratio: 27.12

Other information
- Website: Official website

IDEA Public Schools, Inc (Individuals Dedicated to Excellence and Achievement Public Schools) is a not‐for‐profit charter school operator based in Weslaco, Texas. It was formed in June 2000. In 2015 it served about 19,000 students in 36 schools, about 85% of whom were economically disadvantaged.

== History ==
IDEA Public Schools, Inc. was co-founded by Tom Torkelson and JoAnn Gama, former Teach For America corps members, as a not‐for‐profit Texas corporation headquartered in Weslaco. Its mission was to create charter schools to serve impoverished students, starting in Donna, Texas, in the Rio Grande Valley. Tracy Epp was a Teach for America colleague who helped them write the charter, joined the board of IDEA, and became the first principal of the first IDEA high school in 2003 and in 2008 became IDEA's chief academic officer.

By 2008 IDEA had 10 schools and was serving 4,000 students and by 2010 IDEA had 14,000 students on a waiting list for its schools in the Rio Grande Valley.

In 2011 the Austin Independent School District contracted with IDEA to take over Allan Elementary, a school with a 95% low-income student population, and run it as an in-district public charter school starting with the 2012 school year. However many parents and an offshoot of the Occupy Austin protest group opposed the plan, claiming that the school was being used as an experiment to create education reform in the city. Many parents withdrew their children from the school, and IDEA had to recruit from outside the neighborhood and even outside of East Austin to get students. The school district canceled the contract in 2012, and IDEA opened a new school in its own IDEA school district and on its own land about nine miles south of the Allen. About 80% of the students elected to go to the IDEA school starting in 2013, leaving Allan Elementary empty and unused and taking about $60 million over the subsequent seven years out of the Austin school district.

In 2012 IDEA opened its first school in San Antonio when former basketball player David Robinson invited IDEA to take over Carver Academy, a private elementary school he had started in 2001; in the next three years IDEA opened five more schools there.

IDEA's Contract for Charter with the State of Texas was renewed in 2015 and expires in 2025.

As of 2015 it served about 19,000 students in 36 schools, about 85% of whom were economically disadvantaged.

In 2016 IDEA was in advanced negotiations to establish schools in El Paso and in Baton Rouge, Louisiana, and received a $16M donation to expand its operations in Austin from three schools to 26 schools.

In 2018 the San Antonio city government allowed IDEA to issue tax-exempt bonds, which are less expensive than the kinds of bonds it could previously issue. San Antonio-area public school districts protested the move, stated that this would cause charter schools to cannibalize them. In 2019 IDEA announced plans to expand in the San Antonio area after the United States Department of Education issued it a $116 million grant. It also announced plans to establish charter schools in Greater Houston.

In 2020, co-founder Tom Torkelson resigned from his position as CEO, with fellow co-founder JoAnn Gama taking his place.

In 2021, Gama, along with chief operating officer Irma Muñoz, was fired following an investigation concluding that they were involved in the misuse of funds. Board of directors chair Al Lopez took over as acting superintendent and CEO.

Following the death of Lopez in 2022, Collin Sewell took over his position as chair, superintendent, and CEO. Later, Dr. Jeff Cottrill took over the roles of superintendent and CEO.

== Teachers ==
According to the Houston Association of Realtors (HAR) and based on 2015 data, 24.5% of teachers were currently beginning their first year of teaching at IDEA, 60% had about 1 to 5 years of experience while 9.8% had 6 to 10 years of teaching experience. Around 5% of teachers had 11 to 20 years of experience while less than 1 percent had over 20 years of experience. In terms of ethnicity, the teacher population was 1.6% Asian/Pacific Islander, 2.9% African American, 77.4% Hispanic, 17.6% White and 0.3% were of two or more races. IDEA officials said in 2016 that about 12% of their teachers were Teach for America corps members.

== Schools ==
Individual IDEA schools usually launch on their own land with only three or four grades: kindergarten, first, and second grades in an "Academy" (as IDEA calls their primary schools), and a sixth grade to seed a "College Preparatory" school, which combines middle school and high school. It fills in the rest of the grades over the next six or seven years. IDEA has offered preschool programs.

When IDEA prepares to launch a new school, it markets the school door-to-door.

=== Student life ===
As of 2016 around 95% of IDEA students were Hispanic, around 85% were economically disadvantaged, for around 33% English was a second language, and 5% of IDEA's students had special education needs.

Each campus requires students to wear a polo shirt with the IDEA logo and campus name and khaki or navy pants. In the past, students were required to keep their hair neat; for young men no facial hair was allowed and their hair must be short, and young women could wear only light makeup. As of late, many IDEA schools have become less strict about student self-expression.

IDEA schools hold a "College Signing Day" event each year to celebrate academic achievement, at which seniors announce the college to which they have been accepted. In 2016 IDEA said that 62% of graduates were the first people in their family to attend college.

=== Academics ===
Admission is carried out by lottery, but students who have a juvenile record or a history of disciplinary problems may be excluded.

The schools have a reputation for being academically rigorous. In 2016 the student to teacher ratio was 22; the statewide ratio was 15.2.

Most of the curriculum for kindergarten through second grade is scripted. In all levels students in a given class are grouped be skill level and are regularly assessed, and group assignments changed accordingly. Groups move through defined sequences of lessons. All classes are taught in English.

Students cannot advance to sixth grade without passing the State of Texas Assessment of Academic Readiness (STAAR) exam in 5th grade, and they cannot advance to 9th grade without passing the STAAR exam. Students get three tries and tutoring, and if they still fail, they are held back. About 15% of students in an IDEA school in eighth grade are no longer there by eleventh grade.

Students take courses to learn the skills needed to take Advanced Placement courses beginning in sixth grade and in ninth grade they take their first AP course. They are scheduled to take eleven AP courses.

According to IDEA's student handbook as of 2015, students are eligible to graduate “only if the student successfully completes the curriculum requirements identified by the SBOE (State Board of Education), has been accepted into a 4-year college or university, has completed a minimum of 125 hours of community service, and has performed satisfactorily on required end of course assessment instruments.” As of 2015, about 65% of students who entered 9th grade did not graduate at an IDEA school.

== Finances ==
Like other public schools, IDEA schools get state funding on a per-student basis, and they also get federal funding on a per-low-income-student basis from the federal government under Title I.

In its 2015 audited financial statement IDEA reported having about $445M in assets (cash, incoming grants, land, buildings, etc); in 2014 it had about $356M. It reported about $213M of income in 2015, with about $12M coming from cities or towns, about $164M from state funding, and about $37M from the federal government, with about $13M of that for child nutrition; its expenses were about $194M.

=== Bonds ===
Like many charter schools, IDEA fueled growth by selling bonds which were treated as risky by the bond markets; in 2013 it raised $63M by selling bonds rated BBB by Standard & Poor's and priced to yield 4.5 percent, or about 1.5 percentage points more than the standard rate.

=== Grants ===
In 2010 the United States Department of Education, under its Investing in Innovation program, awarded IDEA and the Pharr-San Juan-Alamo Independent School District a $5M grant to train teachers. IDEA raised an additional $3M in private donations to fund the teacher training center; hiring teachers from the Rio Grande Valley was a goal for both school systems but people who had already been educated there were under-prepared.

In 2012 the company received a Race to the Top grant for $29.2M from the U.S. Department of Education. It was one of sixteen winners chosen from the original pool of 372 applicants; two other charter schools were among the recipients. In 2012 it also received a Department of Education grant of $11.5M to be paid over the next seven years.

In 2013 it had received significant funding from Choose to Succeed, a coalition of San Antonio-based foundations seeking to bring more charter schools to their city.

As of 2016, IDEA had received grants from the Charter School Growth Fund and the Walton Family Foundation,

In May 2016 IDEA received a $16M donation from the KLE Foundation, a local non-profit, to expand in Austin.

=== Salaries ===
In 2016 IDEA employed 876 teachers and the average teacher salary was $44,572 (statewide: $50,715); salaries ranged from a beginner's salary of $38,152 (statewide: $44,540) to someone with 20+ years experience making $60,175 (statewide: $59,787).

In 2011, the CEO Tom Torkelson received a base pay rate of $238,812 and with 9,505 students in IDEA schools, had a salary-to-student ratio of $25.121 in the same year the superintendent of the Dallas ISD was responsible for 157,575 students and had a salary of $211,216 for a ratio of $1.34. In 2012, his base salary was $299,000 and in 2013 his total compensation reportable to the IRS was $373,307.

== Media attention ==
=== National rankings ===
In 2016 the U.S. News & World Report High School Rankings listed seven IDEA college preparatory schools, three of which reported graduate rates ranging from 98 to 100% and four of which had no rates listed. College readiness percentages ranged from 54% to 86% with no data available for one. Their Texas state rankings ranged from 15th to 67th with no data on one of them. Six of the schools received gold medal rankings.

The Washington Post included seven of IDEA's eligible College Preparatory schools in its 2016 ranking of America's Most Challenging High Schools. IDEA Mission ranked 11 in the nation and 4 in Texas and IDEA Frontier ranked 15 in America and 5 in Texas. Other campuses included San Benito, Quest, San Juan, Alamo, and Donna. Each school also made the list the year prior. Jay Mathews commented on the ranking in the Post: "Even more startling is the appearance of six public charter high schools in some of the poorest parts of Texas among the top 50 schools on our list, which I have produced for The Post (and previously for Newsweek) for 18 years. Those six schools, and a seventh that ranks No. 106, are all part of the Idea (sic) Public Schools charter network."

In the 2014 U.S. News & World Report high school rankings, there were 3 IDEA schools listed; the IDEA college prep school in Donna ranked 30 out of all public high schools in the United States and 5th in the state of Texas.

In 2022, the Jay Mathews Challenge Index placed IDEA McAllen College Prep (CP) as the best school in the United States of America, with IDEA Pharr CP, IDEA San Juan CP, and IDEA Frontier CP placing in the top ten of the ranking.

=== Awards and recognition ===
In 2015 the US Department of Education included IDEA as one of its "Bright Spots" in Latino education, as part of the celebration of the 25th anniversary of the White House Initiative on Educational Excellence for Hispanics.

In 2015 Children at Risk, a children's advocacy group in Houston, published a report evaluating data on charter schools in Texas that concluded: "Some charters, including YES Prep, KIPP, Idea Public Schools, Texas Preparatory Network, and Uplift Education are taking disadvantaged students to new heights of academic success, achieving what nobody thought possible. These high-performing charters excel in the education of Texas children, and do so in spite of serving a greater percentage of economically-disadvantaged children than the state average."

In 2016 IDEA, YES Prep Public Schools, and Success Academy were named as the top three finalists for the annual Broad Prize for Charter Schools; IDEA had been a finalist in 2014 and 2015 as well.

=== Criticism and controversy ===
On May 25, 2011, over 40 sensitive emails were leaked to local businesses and education leaders which mentioned the lack of potential that teachers had to be promoted into a higher position, such as a leadership role. The leaked emails were also sent to state charter officials and other IDEA staff which contained talks about expansion to other cities such as San Antonio and Austin, a bias towards Teach For America corps members and criticism involving an administrator in the Pharr-San Juan-Alamo district. In regards to preference for Teach For America members, Tom Torkelson said that he would place a "20 year veteran" if he or she could produce "expected student success results." Speaking about the administrator incident, Torkelson said that he was "frustrated" and used "some very choice words" at the moment, but has mentioned that the partnership with PSJA has been "going better than ever."

The district has been criticized for selecting students based on academic performance. Dr. Ed Fuller, a professor at Pennsylvania State University, has said that IDEA schools do not enroll "underserved" students. Antonio Limon, a San Benito school superintendent, criticized the district for "cherry picking" its students. Limon claimed that IDEA picked higher performing students when holding lotteries for admission. Torkelson has denied these claims, stating that schools host "transparent, public lotteries." Limon, however, said that even though lotteries are hosted, the district keeps the "best" students, while taking out the lower performing ones.

AlterNet, a progressive news outlet and Independent Media Institute project, criticized IDEA for eliminating "critical thinking" in the district's curriculum, placing board members from banking organizations to generate profit for the school and taking taxpayer money to create expansion. The source has commented that IDEA board members belong to organizations such as JPMorgan Chase, Wells Fargo and the International Bank of Commerce. IDEA's organization status was also criticized for taking "public subsidies" to continue operating.

Although the school often "boasts" that it has a near 100% rate of its graduates going to college, students cannot graduate unless they have been accepted to college.

The school's leadership drew criticism due to its plans to purchase a multimillion dollar private jet, as well as spending $400,000 on tickets for box seats at the AT&T Center.

== See also ==
- K-12 education
- Education in the United States
- Non-profit organization
