= Challenge Index =

American high school ranking method

The Challenge Index is a method for the statistical ranking of top public and private high schools in the United States, created by The Washington Post columnist Jay Mathews. It is also the only statistical ranking system for both public and private high schools. The ranking is determined by the extent of availability of the Advanced Placement and International Baccalaureate Programs in the school's curriculum and the number of graduating seniors.

For each school, the study tallies the total number of AP and IB exams that are taken that year in the school. This sum is divided by the number of students graduating in that same year. This ratio is the Challenge Index. Not incorporated with the study are any school that accepts over 50% of its students via a placement test or other type of admission criterion. The study effectively demonstrates the public schools with the greatest opportunity for all students to challenge themselves with college-level courses.

However, critics argue that this ranking system does a disservice by not taking into consideration the actual performance of the student exams, but merely the number of exams taken. Administrators of the study acknowledge that the system is "not a measurement of the overall quality of the school but illuminates one factor that many educators consider important." The validity of the Challenge Index has been strongly criticized by education analysts Andrew J. Rotherham and Sara Mead of Education Sector in Washington, DC. Their 2006 paper, "Challenged Index" showed how many schools that are among the top 100 nationally, according to Newsweek, actually have high dropout rates and wide gaps in achievement separating students by race and income. A summary of their argument appeared in The Washington Post and Jay Mathews responded. The editors, primarily Jay Mathews, defend their ratings by citing recent studies by U.S. Department of Education senior researcher Clifford Adelman. In 1999 and 2005, Adelman showed that the best predictor of college graduation was not good high-school grades or test scores, but whether or not a student had an intense academic experience in high school. The demands of higher level, college-type courses in high school would, according to Newsweek, provide that experience. The editors are critical of some other indices of school excellence, such as U.S. News & World Report “America’s Best Colleges”, as including too many factors, and of American high schools in general since only 5% of all US high schools make the Newsweek list by having at least 1 AP or IB test score per each graduating senior.

Tabulated results of the Challenge Index are published for Washington area high schools in The Washington Post annually. Newsweek also publishes nationwide results each year.
