= Science (UIL test) =

Academic competition in Texas, US

In the US state of Texas Science is one of several academic events sanctioned by the University Interscholastic League. It is also a competition held by the Texas Math and Science Coaches Association, using the same rules as the UIL.

Science is designed to test students' knowledge of scientific fact, understanding of scientific principles and the ability to think through scientific problems.

== Eligibility ==
Students in Grade 6 through Grade 12 are eligible to enter this event.

For competition purposes, Grades 6, 7 and 8 compete in separate divisions with the same test, while Grades 9-12 compete together, with separate subjects covered on each test as follows:

- The test for Grades 6-8 covers matter and energy, equilibrium, force and motion, physical and chemical properties, the relationship between organisms and the environment, the components of our solar system, and the composition of matter and genetics.
- The test for Grades 9-12 covers biology, chemistry, and physics, with 20 questions in each general field (though physics and chemistry often overlap).

Each school may send up to four students for each junior high division. In order for a school to participate in team competition, the school must send three students.

For Grades 9-12 each school may send up to six students; students qualify for the next level if they are on the winning team, score in the top three individuals at a meet, or place first in biology, chemistry, or physics. In order for a school to participate in team competition, the school must send at least three students. Team scores are found by adding the scores of the top 3 individuals from a school.

== Rules and scoring ==
As the format and rules differ significantly for the junior high and high school levels, each is discussed separately below.

=== Junior High Level ===
The test consists of 50 questions, which must be completed in 45 minutes. A time warning is given at 30 minutes. At the stop signal, incomplete answers cannot be completed. Calculators are not allowed.

The questions may be answered in any order; there is no penalty for skipping questions.

Scoring is five points for each correct answer, and two points deducted for each incorrect answer. Unanswered questions are not scored.

=== High School Level ===
At the high school level, the test consists of 60 questions, which must be completed in two hours. The first 20 questions involve biology, the second twenty questions involve chemistry, and the final twenty questions involve physics. No time warning is given, except that tests cannot be turned in until the proctor announces that 30 minutes have passed.

The questions may be answered in any order; there is no penalty for skipping questions.

Questions must be answered to the proper number of significant digits, with "small variation" in the final significant digit acceptable.

The test booklet includes a periodic table of the elements, including atomic weights and atomic numbers, plus other scientific relationships, such as the vacuum speed of light or the gravitational constant, which may be used by the student.

Scratch paper is allowed in the contest, and notations may be made anywhere except on the answer sheet. Students may bring one calculator plus one spare, so long as it does not need external power. Hand-held computers are not allowed, nor are any calculators with factory-installed memory or with the ability to accept memory cards or memory sticks.

Scoring is six points for each correct answer, and two points deducted for each incorrect answer Unanswered questions are not scored. In addition to the total score, each subsection (biology, chemistry, and physics) is scored separately.

== Determining the winner ==
=== Junior High ===
Scoring is posted for only the top six individual places and the top three teams.

There are no tiebreakers for either individual or team competition.

=== High School Level ===
The top three individuals and the top team (determined based on the scores of the top three individuals) will advance to the next round. In addition, within each region, the highest-scoring second place team from all district competitions advances as the "wild card" to regional competition (provided the team has four members), and within the state, the highest-scoring second place team from all regional competitions advances as the wild card to the state competition. Members of advancing teams who did not place individually remain eligible to compete for individual awards at higher levels. Furthermore, the individuals with the top score in each subsection will also advance even if the individual was not one of the top three overall scorers or the top team.

For individual competition (overall and for each subsection), the tiebreaker is percent accuracy (number of problems answered correctly divided by number of problems attempted, defined as any question with a mark or erasure in the answer blank). In the event a tie remains, all remaining individuals will advance.

For team competition, the score of the fourth-place individual is used as the tiebreaker. If a team has only three members it is not eligible to participate in the tiebreaker. If the fourth-place score still results in a tie, the individual tiebreaker rules will not apply, and all remaining tied teams will advance. At the state level ties for first place are not broken.

For district meet academic championship and district meet sweepstakes awards, points are awarded to the school as follows:

- Individual places:
  - Overall score: 1st—15, 2nd—12, 3rd—10, 4th—8, 5th—6, and 6th—4.
  - In addition, the school with the top scorer in a subsection receives 3 points. A school can earn multiple subsection points even if the same student is the top scorer in two, or all three, of the subsections.
- Team places: 1st—10 and 2nd—5.
- The maximum number of points a school can earn in Science is 42.

The student with the most wins in the history of the competition is Kieran Fitzgerald from Friendswood High School, who achieved the highest score in any division three years in a row: 2003-2004, 2004-2005, and 2005-2006.

== List of prior winners ==
=== Individual (Overall) ===
NOTE: For privacy reasons, only the winning school is shown. The 1958-59 winner was an "all schools" winner; beginning with the 1959-60 academic year winners were held in all five classifications. The classifications were renumbered in 1980-81, with Class B becoming Class A and the other classes adding one letter (thus, Class A became Class AA, and so forth).

School Year	Class A	Class AA	Class AAA	Class AAAA	Class AAAAA	Class AAAAAA
1980-81	Paint Rock	Wolfe City	New Braunfels	Brownfield	Houston Westchester	
1981-82	Paint Rock	Lindsay	Kermit	College Station A&M Consolidated	Plano	
1982-83	Roby	Anna	North Lamar	Alamo Heights	Houston Stratford	
1983-84	Lindsay	Springlake-Earth	Pflugerville	New Braunfels	Arlington Lamar	
1984-85	Gold-Burg	Baird	North Lamar	Corpus Christi Flour Bluff	Lubbock	
1985-86	Lenorah Grady	Baird	Slaton	Austin Westlake	Arlington	
1986-87	Lindsay	Liberty Hill	Slaton	Denison	Houston Stratford	
1987-88	Lindsay	Clifton	Lampasas	Cedar Hill	Houston Stratford	
1988-89	Plains	Redwater	Lampasas	Granbury	League City Clear Creek	
1989-90	Avery	Redwater	Bishop	Kerrville Tivy	Houston Memorial	
1990-91	Valley Mills	Springlake-Earth	Lampasas	Kerrville Tivy	League City Clear Creek	
1991-92	Valley Mills	Canadian	Troy	Carthage	Klein	
1992-93	Lindsay	Wimberley	Seminole	Kingsville	San Antonio Holmes	
1993-94	Lindsay	Florence	Cuero	Kingsville	San Antonio Holmes	
1994-95	Rule	Troup	Waco Connally	Mesquite Poteet	Fort Worth Dunbar	
1995-96	Rule	Franklin	Wimberley	Austin Johnson	Sugar Land Elkins	
1996-97	Garden City	Canadian	Commerce	Austin Anderson	Humble	
1997-98	Lenorah Grady	Sundown	Bridgeport	Austin Johnson	College Station A&M Consolidated	
1998-99	Lenorah Grady	Rogers	Alvarado	Austin Johnson	Tyler Lee	
1999-2000	Water Valley	Salado	La Feria	Gregory-Portland	Houston Bellaire	
2000-01	Lenorah Grady	Stinnett West Texas	Seminole	Kingsville	Arlington Lamar	
2001-02	High Island	Pattonville Prairiland	Seminole	Cedar Park	South Texas Science Academy	
2002-03	Port Aransas	Argyle	Wimberley	White Settlement Brewer	Brazoswood	
2003-04	Avery	Argyle	Ballinger	Friendswood	Klein	
2004-05	Port Aransas	Argyle	Seminole	Friendswood	Sugar Land Clements	
2005-06	(tie) Garden City/Nueces Canyon	Argyle	Cuero	Friendswood	Katy Taylor	
2006-07	Garden City	Floydada	Cuero	Highland Park	San Antonio MacArthur	
2007-08	Moulton	Vanderbilt Industrial	Wimberley	Friendswood	Sugar Land Clements	
2008-09	Canadian	White Oak	Wimberley	Austin Lake Travis	Arlington Martin	
2009-10	Canadian	White Oak	Whitney	Highland Park	Sugar Land Clements	
2010-11	Canadian	Whitney	La Feria	Highland Park	Fort Worth Paschal	
2011-12	Canadian	Lago Vista	La Feria	Highland Park	Sugar Land Dulles	
2012-13	Sundown	Whitney	Argyle	Highland Park	Dallas Science & Engineering Magnet	
2013-14	Lockney	San Antonio Cole	Argyle	Pearland Dawson	Sugar Land Dulles	
2020-21	Guthrie	Eldorado	Skidmore-Tynan	Argyle	Mission Sharyland Pioneer	Arlington Martin

=== Individual (Biology) ===
NOTE: For privacy reasons, only the winning school is shown. The UIL did not score individual subsections until the 1985-86 scholastic year.

School Year	Class A	Class AA	Class AAA	Class AAAA	Class AAAAA	Class AAAAAA
1985-86	Ropesville Ropes	Waskom	Slaton	Dayton	Sugar Land Dulles	
1986-87	Lindsay	Waskom	Slaton	Corpus Christi Flour Bluff	Killeen Ellison	
1987-88	Lindsay	San Antonio Lackland	Lampasas	Cedar Hill	Arlington	
1988-89	Wheeler	Van Alstyne	Lampasas	Andrews	Lubbock	
1989-90	(tie) Avery/Petrolia/Medina	Redwater	Wylie	North Lamar	Jersey Village	
1990-91	Valley Mills	Waskom	Lampasas	Kerrville Tivy	League City Clear Creek	
1991-92	Lindsay	Ingram Tom Moore	Halletsville	(tie) Carthage/Highland Park	(tie) Klein/Langham Creek	
1992-93	Lindsay	Canadian	Rockdale	North Lamar	Sugar Land Clements	
1993-94	Lindsay	Valley Mills	Pearsall	North Lamar	Fort Worth Dunbar	
1994-95	Rule	Troup	Wimberley	(tie) Mesquite Poteet/North Lamar	Fort Worth Dunbar	
1995-96	Rule	Franklin	Kirbyville	(tie) Port Lavaca Calhoun/Austin Johnson/North Lamar	College Station A&M Consolidated	
1996-97	Garden City	Yorktown	Commerce	Longview Pine Tree	(tie) Houston Bellaire/Sugar Land Clements	
1997-98	Lenorah Grady	Lexington	Wimberley	Bay City	Corpus Christi Carroll	
1998-99	Lenorah Grady	Callisburg	Shallowater	(tie) Midlothian/Sulphur Springs	Austin Westlake	
1999-2000	Lenorah Grady	Coleman	Kirbyville	Gregory-Portland	Houston Bellaire	
2000-01	Lenorah Grady	Callisburg	Kirbyville	Longview Pine Tree	Sugar Land Clements	
2001-02	(unavailable)	Comfort	(unavailable)	(unavailable)	(unavailable)	
2002-03	(unavailable)	Comfort	(unavailable)	(unavailable)	(unavailable)	
2003-04	Shiner	Junction	Wimberley	Friendswood	Taylor	
2004-05	Martin's Mill	Teague	La Grange	Friendswood	Clements	
2005-06	Garden City	Floydada	Pleasant Grove	Highland Park	Clements	
2006-07	Garden City	Floydada	Graham	Highland Park	San Antonio MacArthur	
2007-08	Muenster	Elysian Fields	White Oak	Highland Park	Sugar Land Clements	
2008-09	Flatonia	White Oak	Whitney	Austin Lake Travis	Sugar Land Clements	
2009-10	Muenster	White Oak	La Feria	Wichita Falls	Sugar Land Clements	
2010-11	Albany	Whitney	La Feria	Highland Park	Sugar Land Clements	
2011-12	Valley View	Whitney	Lucas Lovejoy	The Colony	Fort Worth Paschal	
2013-14	Lockney	San Antonio Cole	Argyle	Pearland Dawson	Westlake	
2020-21	Guthrie	Albany	Tuscola Jim Ned	Argyle	New Braunfels Canyon	San Antonio Reagan

=== Individual (Chemistry) ===
NOTE: For privacy reasons, only the winning school is shown. The UIL did not score individual subsections until the 1985-86 scholastic year.

School Year	Class A	Class AA	Class AAA	Class AAAA	Class AAAAA	Class AAAAAA
1985-86	Bronte	Liberty Hill	Slaton	Austin Westlake	Sugar Land Dulles	
1986-87	Lindsay	Liberty Hill	Slaton	Cedar Hill	Dallas Skyline	
1987-88	Happy	Clifton	Lampasas	Cedar Hill	Lubbock	
1988-89	Plains	Abernathy	Lampasas	McKinney	Brazoswood	
1989-90	Valley Mills	Van Alstyne	Bishop	Highland Park	Fort Worth Dunbar	
1990-91	Valley Mills	Canadian	Abilene Wylie	(tie) Carthage/Kerrville Tivy	(tie) League City Clear Creek/Lubbock/Pasadena Dobie/Houston Strafford	
1991-92	Valley Mills	Canadian	Troy	Highland Park	Langham Creek	
1992-93	Vega	Canadian	Dripping Springs	Kingsville	San Antonio Holmes	
1993-94	Lindsay	Stinnett West Texas	Bridgeport	Corpus Christi Flour Bluff	San Antonio Holmes	
1994-95	Lindsay	Stinnett West Texas	Bridgeport	Mesquite Poteet	Sugar Land Elkins	
1995-96	Rule	Franklin	Kirbyville	Austin Johnson	Round Rock Westwood	
1996-97	Moulton	Stinnett West Texas	Wimberley	(tie) Highland Park/Waco Midway/Willis	Humble	
1997-98	Moulton	Stinnett West Texas	Kirbyville	Highland Park	Tyler Lee	
1998-99	San Antonio Lackland	Jourdanton	Alvarado	(tie) Gregory-Portland/Sulphur Springs	Arlington Lamar	
1999-2000	Water Valley	Stinnett West Texas	Orangefield	Gregory-Portland	Houston Bellaire	
2000-01	Hedley	Stinnett West Texas	Seminole	Kingsville	Klein	
2001-02	(unavailable)	(unavailable)	(unavailable)	(unavailable)	(unavailable)	
2002-03	(unavailable)	(Comfort)	(unavailable)	(unavailable)	(unavailable)	
2003-04	Avery	Argyle	Wimberley	Friendswood	Pharr-San Juan-Alamo North	
2004-05	Academy	Floydada	Wimberley	Friendswood	College Station A&M Consolidated	
2005-06	Avery	Harmony Science Academy	Cuero	Friendswood	Oak Ridge	
2006-07	Houston Harmony Science Academy	Floydada	Cuero	North Richland Hills Birdville	(tie) San Antonio MacArthur/Sugar Land Clements/College Station A&M Consolidated	
2007-08	Moulton	New Boston	Wimberley	North Richland Hills Birdville	Plano	
2008-09	Lindsay	White Oak	Wimberley	Frindswood	(tie)Plano/Sugar Land Clements	
2009-10	Canadian	Irving North Hills	New Boston	Dallas Highland Park	South Texas Science Academy	
2010-11	Canadian	White Oak	La Feria	Pearland Dawson	Fort Worth Paschal	
2013-14	Fort Worth Harmony School of Innovation	Lago Vista	Argyle	Whitehouse	Sugar Land Dulles	
2020-21	Avery	Eldorado	Skidmore-Tynan	Argyle	Mercedes South Texas Science Academy	Fort Worth Paschal

=== Individual (Physics) ===
NOTE: For privacy reasons, only the winning school is shown. The UIL did not score individual subsections until the 1985-86 scholastic year.

School Year	Class A	Class AA	Class AAA	Class AAAA	Class AAAAA	Class AAAAAA
1985-86	Lenorah Grady	Plains	Pflugerville	San Antonio Southwest	Arlington	
1986-87	Moulton	Liberty Hill	Slaton	Buda Hays Consolidated	Houston Stratford	
1987-88	Lindsay	Eastland	Lampasas	Cedar Hill	San Antonio Clark	
1988-89	Falls City	Iraan	Lampasas	Dickinson	(tie) Houston Bellaire/San Antonio Clark	
1989-90	Plains	Blanco	Bishop	Saginaw Boswell	League City Clear Creek	
1990-91	Valley Mills	Springlake-Earth	Van	Kerrville Tivy	(tie) Lubbock/Tyler Lee	
1991-92	Lindsay	(tie) Ingram Tom Moore/Wimberley	Troy	Highland Park	Pasadena Dobie	
1992-93	Lindsay	Wimberley	Seminole	Kingsville	San Antonio Marshall	
1993-94	Lindsay	Florence	Wylie	Red Oak	Fort Worth Dunbar	
1994-95	Rule	Eldorado	Waco Connally	Stephenville	Fort Worth Dunbar	
1995-96	Thorndale	Boling	Wimberley	Austin Johnson	(tie) Houston Bellaire/Sugar Land Elkins	
1996-97	Evadale	Eldorado	Bridgeport	Carthage	(tie) College Station A&M Consolidated/Fort Worth Dunbar	
1997-98	Moulton	Sundown	Bridgeport	Austin Johnson	Humble	
1998-99	Valley View	Rogers	(tie) Alvarado/Stafford	Wichita Falls Rider	Austin Westlake	
1999-2000	Valley View	Universal City Randolph	Vanderbilt Industrial	Highland Park	Houston Bellaire	
2000-01	Lenorah Grady	Stinnett West Texas	Seminole	Carthage	Arlington Lamar	
2001-02	(unavailable)	(unavailable)	(unavailable)	(unavailable)	(unavailable)	
2002-03	(unavailable)	(unavailable)	(unavailable)	(unavailable)	(unavailable)	
2003-04	Spring Lake	Argyle	China Spring	Johnson	Klein	
2004-05	Valley View	Argyle	Cuero	Friendswood	College Station A&M Consolidated	
2005-06	Garden City	Argyle	Hardin-Jefferson	Friendswood	College Station A&M Consolidated	
2006-07	Garden City	Three Rivers	Cuero	Katy Seven Lakes	College Station A&M Consolidated	
2007-08	Yantis	Irving North Hills	Argyle	Friendswood	Beaumont West Brook	
2008-09	Perrin-Whitt	White Oak	Argyle	Austin Lake Travis	Arlington Martin	
2009-10	Canadian	White Oak	Pollok Central	Dallas Highland Park	San Antonio MacArthur	
2010-11	Gail Borden	(tie) Whitney/New Boston	Argyle	Austin Lake Travis	Allen	
2013-14	(tie) Avery/Comstock	George West	Argyle	Pearland Dawson	Sugar Land Dulles	
2020-21	Guthrie	Eldorado	Fort Worth IDEA College Prep	Port Lavaca Calhoun	New Braunfels Canyon	Arlington Martin

=== Team ===
NOTE: UIL did not recognize a team championship in this event until the 1990-91 scholastic year.

School Year	Class A	Class AA	Class AAA	Class AAAA	Class AAAAA	Class AAAAAA
1990-91	Valley Mills	Canadian	Lampasas	Waco Midway	Lubbock	
1991-92	Valley Mills	Canadian	Troy	Highland Park	Lubbock	
1992-93	Lindsay	Wimberley	Seminole	Kingsville	San Antonio Holmes	
1993-94	Lindsay	Canadian	Cuero	North Lamar	Fort Worth Dunbar	
1994-95	Lindsay	Troup	Waco Connally	North Lamar	Plano	
1995-96	Rule	Canadian	Wimberley	Austin Johnson	Houston Bellaire	
1996-97	Vega	Stinnett West Texas	Bridgeport	Waco Midway	Humble	
1997-98	Moulton	Stinnett West Texas	Wimberley	Highland Park	Humble	
1998-99	Lenorah Grady	Lindsay	Wimberley	Highland Park	Arlington Lamar	
1999-2000	Hedley	Stinnett West Texas	Bridgeport	Gregory-Portland	Houston Bellaire	
2000-01	Lenorah Grady	Seymour	Bridgeport	Carthage	Arlington Lamar	
2001-02	(tie) Sudan/Vega	Argyle	Seminole	Fredericksburg	South Texas Science Academy	
2002-03	Port Aransas	Argyle	Wimberley	Jacksonville	Fort Bend Hightower	
2003-04	Vega	Argyle	Ballinger	Wichita Falls	Katy Taylor	
2004-05	Kingsville Academy	Argyle	Wimberley	Friendswood	Sugar Land Clements	
2005-06	Garden City	Argyle	Cuero	Highland Park	Sugar Land Clements	
2006-07	Garden City	Floydada	Cuero	Highland Park	Sugar Land Clements	
2007-08	Harper	Floydada	Argyle	Highland Park	Sugar Land Clements	
2008-09	Lindsay	(tie) North Hills School Irving/White Oak	Whitney	Highland Park	Sugar Land Dulles	
2009-10	Canadian	North Hills School Irving	(tie) La Feria/Whitney	Highland Park	Sugar Land Clements	
2010-11	Avery	Whitney	La Feria	Highland Park	Fort Worth Paschal	
2011-12	Valley View	Whitney	La Feria	Highland Park	Sugar Land Dulles	
2012-13	Valley View	Whitney	Argyle	Highland Park	Sugar Land Dulles	
2013-14	Harmony School of Innovation	Lago Vista	Argyle	Pearland Dawson	Sugar Land Dulles	
2014-15	Knippa	Valley View	Whitney	Argyle	College Station	Sugar Land Dulles
2015-16	Knippa	Lockney	Whitney	Argyle	Frisco Liberty	Sugar Land Dulles
2016-17	Cross Plains	Thrall	Whitney	Argyle	Highland Park	Sugar Land Dulles
2017-18	Cross Plains	Lindsay	Whitney	Argyle	Highland Park	Sugar Land Clements
2018-19	Lamesa Klondike	Thrall	Whitney	La Feria	Highland Park	Sugar Land Dulles
