= Mathematics (UIL) =

Mathematics (sometimes referred to as General Math, to distinguish it from other mathematics-related events) is one of several academic events sanctioned by the University Interscholastic League. It is also a competition held by the Texas Math and Science Coaches Association, using the same rules as the UIL.

Mathematics is designed to test students' understanding of advanced mathematics. The UIL contest began in 1943, and is among the oldest of all UIL academic contests.

== Eligibility ==
Students in Grade 6 through Grade 12 are eligible to enter this event. For competition purposes, separate divisions are held for Grades 6-8 and Grades 9–12, with separate subjects covered on each test as follows:

- The test for Grades 6-8 covers numeration systems, arithmetic operations involving whole numbers, integers, fractions, decimals, exponents, order of operations, probability, statistics, number theory, simple interest, measurements and conversions, plus possibly geometry and algebra problems (as appropriate for the grade level).
- The test for Grades 9-12 covers algebra I and II, geometry, trigonometry, math analysis, analytic geometry, pre-calculus, and elementary calculus.

For Grades 6-8 each school may send up to three students per division. In order for a school to participate in team competition in a division, the school must send three students in that division.

For Grades 9-12 each school may send up to four students; however, in districts with more than eight schools the district executive committee can limit participation to three students per school. In order for a school to participate in team competition, the school must send at least three students.

== Rules and Scoring ==
At the junior high level, the test consists of 50 questions and is limited to only 30 minutes. At the high school level, the test consists of 60 questions and is limited to only 40 minutes. Both tests are multiple choice.

There is no intermediate time signal given; at the end of the allotted time the students must immediately stop writing (they are not allowed to finish incomplete answers started before the stop signal). If contestants are in the process of writing down an answer, they may finish; they may not do additional work on a test question.

The questions can be answered in any order; a skipped question is not scored.

Calculators are permitted provided they are (or were) commercially available models, run quietly, and do not require auxiliary power. One calculator plus one spare is permitted.

Five points are awarded for each correct answer at the junior high level while six points are awarded at the high school level. Two points are deducted for each wrong answer. Skipped or unanswered questions are not scored.

== Determining the Winner ==
=== Elementary and Junior High ===
Scoring is posted for only the top six individual places and the top three teams.

There are no tiebreakers for either individual or team competition.

=== High School Level ===
The top three individuals and the top team (determined based on the scores of the top three individuals) advance to the next round. In addition, within each region, the highest-scoring second place team from all district competitions advances as the "wild card" to regional competition (provided the team has four members), and within the state, the highest-scoring second place team from all regional competitions advances as the wild card to the state competition. Members of advancing teams who did not place individually remain eligible to compete for individual awards at higher levels.

For individual competition, the tiebreaker is percent accuracy (number of questions answered correctly divided by number of questions attempted). If a tie still exists all tied individuals will advance.

For team competition, the score of the fourth-place individual is used as the tiebreaker. If a team has only three members it is not eligible to participate in the tiebreaker. If the fourth-place score still results in a tie, all remaining tied teams will advance. At the state level, ties for first place are not broken.

For district meet academic championship and district meet sweepstakes awards, points are awarded to the school as follows:

- Individual places: 1st—15, 2nd—12, 3rd—10, 4th—8, 5th—6, and 6th—4.
- Team places: 1st—10 and 2nd—5.
- The maximum number of points a school can earn in Mathematics is 47 (15, 12, and 10 points for an individual and 10 points for a top team ranking), though all teams obtaining this number of points is extremely rare.

== List of prior winners ==
=== Individual ===
NOTE: For privacy reasons, only the winning school is shown.

School Year	Class A	Class AA	Class AAA	Class AAAA	Class AAAAA
1991-92	Crawford	Quanah	Ingleside	Katy Taylor	Lubbock
1992-93	San Isidro	Stamford	Bandera	Athens	Klein
1993-94	Wink	Stamford	Mont Belvieu Barbers Hill	College Station A&M Consolidated	Klein
1994-95	Wink	Salado	Waco Connally	Austin Johnson	Plano
1995-96	Rule	Wellington	Bridgeport	Austin Johnson	Sugar Land Elkins
1996-97	Henrietta Midway	Wellington	Bridgeport	Weatherford	College Station A&M Consolidated
1997-98	Jeremy Sain	Wellington	Bridgeport	Weatherford	College Station A&M Consolidated
1998-99	Rule	Yorktown	Sweeny	Weatherford	College Station A&M Consolidated
1999-2000	Valley View	Yorktown	Liberty	Pharr-San Juan-Alamo Memorial	College Station A&M Consolidated
2000-01	Abbott	Valley View	Seminole	Pharr-San Juan-Alamo Memorial	Klein
2001-02	Muenster	Elkhart	Seminole	Longview Pine Tree	Klein
2002-03	Tenaha	Elkhart	Bridgeport	Longview Pine Tree	Spring Westfield
2003-04	San Isidro	Argyle	Bridgeport	Mission Sharyland	Katy Taylor
2004-05	San Isidro	Argyle	Bridgeport	Azle	Sugar Land Dulles
2005-06	Silverton	Argyle	Bridgeport	Klein Oak	College Station A&M Consolidated
2006-07	Lindsay	Wichita Falls City View	Bridgeport	Port Lavaca Calhoun	College Station A&M Consolidated
2007-08	Lindsay	Caddo Mills	Bridge City	Port Lavaca Calhoun	Klein
2008-09	Lindsay	Caddo Mills	Argyle	Port Lavaca Calhoun	Keller
2009-10	Lindsay	Idalou	Argyle	Port Lavaca Calhoun	Sugar Land Kempner
2010-11	Haskell	New Boston	Wichita Falls Hirschi	Pearland Dawson	Sugar Land Dulles

=== Team ===
NOTE: The team competition did not start until the 1992-93 scholastic year.

School Year	Class A	Class AA	Class AAA	Class AAAA	Class AAAAA
1992-93	Sterling City	Stamford	Carrizo Springs	Dallas Hillcrest	Klein
1993-94	Lindsay	Stamford	Carrizo Springs	College Station A&M Consolidated	Lubbock
1994-95	Wink	Salado	Bridgeport	Austin Johnson	College Station A&M Consolidated
1995-96	Rule	Salado	Bridgeport	Austin Johnson	College Station A&M Consolidated
1996-97	Rule	Wellington	Bridgeport	Longview Pine Tree	College Station A&M Consolidated
1997-98	Henrietta Midway	Wellington	Bridgeport	Longview Pine Tree	Klein
1998-99	Valley View	Salado	Santa Rosa	Longview Pine Tree	South Texas Science Academy
1999-2000	Valley View	Elkhart	Bridgeport	Corpus Christi Flour Bluff	Klein
2000-01	Abbott	Valley View	Bridgeport	Mission Sharyland	Klein
2001-02	Muenster	Elkhart	Bridgeport	Longview Pine Tree	Klein
2002-03	Plains	Elkhart	Liberty	Corpus Christi Flour Bluff	Klein
2003-04	D'Hanis	Argyle	Bridgeport	Corpus Christi Flour Bluff	Klein
2004-05	Lindsay	Argyle	Bridgeport	Corpus Christi Flour Bluff	Sugar Land Dulles
2005-06	Garden City	Argyle	Bridgeport	Klein Oak	College Station A&M Consolidated
2006-07	Garden City	McGregor	Argyle	Port Lavaca Calhoun	Sugar Land Clements
2007-08	Lindsay	Caddo Mills	Argyle	Katy Seven Lakes	Klein
2008-09	Lindsay	Caddo Mills	Argyle	Port Lavaca Calhoun	Sugar Land Clements
2009-10	Lindsay	Caddo Mills	New Boston	Port Lavaca Calhoun	Sugar Land Dulles
2010-11	Savoy	New Boston	Argyle	Port Lavaca Calhoun	Sugar Land Dulles
2011-12	Latexo	Brock	Argyle	Port Lavaca Calhoun	Sugar Land Dulles
2012-13	Latexo	Salado	Argyle	Reagan	Sugar Land Dulles
