= Accounting (UIL) =

Accounting is one of several academic events sanctioned by the University Interscholastic League. The contest began in the 1986-87 scholastic year. Accounting is designed to test students' understanding of general accounting principles and practices used in the business environment.

== Eligibility ==
Students in Grade 9 through Grade 12 are eligible to enter this event. All grades compete in one division, but are divided into classifications as determined by school enrollment (As with all University Interscholastic League competitions).

The test covers elementary principles and practices of accounting for sole proprietorships, partnerships, and corporations, and may include bookkeeping terminology, the worksheet with adjustments, income statement, balance sheet, trial balance, account classification, journalizing, posting, bank reconciliation, payroll, and other items related to the basic accounting cycle.

Each school may send up to four students; however, in districts with more than eight schools the district executive committee can limit participation to three students per school. In order for a school to participate in team competition, the school must send at least three students.

== Rules and Scoring ==
The test consists of 80 questions, which must be completed in one hour. A time signal is given at 55 minutes warning students that only five minutes remain; at the end of the hour the students must immediately stop writing.

The questions may be answered in any order; there is no penalty for skipping questions.

Students are allowed to use scratch paper and highlighter pens during the contest. Calculators are also allowed during the contest, provided the following criteria are met:

- The calculators must be basic "four-function" models, though simple functions such as percent, square root, and simple memory are allowed. Higher-level business, financial, statistical, graphing, and scientific calculators are not permitted.
- The calculators must be hand-held, operate silently, not be equipped with a tape output, and be able to operate without requiring external power (rechargeable batteries are permitted but they must be charged prior to competition).
- All memory must be cleared prior to the contest.

Exact answers are required on all questions.

Five points are awarded for each correct answer, no points are deducted for wrong or unanswered problems. In addition, any of the 20 starred questions answered correctly receive one bonus point for each star (e.g., a two-star question answered correctly is worth 7 points, 5 base points for the correct answer plus one point for each star). The highest possible score on any test is a 420.

== Determining the Winner ==
The top three individuals and the top team (determined based on the scores of the top three individuals) will advance to the next round. In addition, within each region, the highest-scoring second place team from all district competitions advances as the "wild card" to regional competition (provided the team has four members), and within the state, the highest-scoring second place team from all regional competitions advances as the wild card to the state competition. Members of advancing teams who did not place individually remain eligible to compete for individual awards at higher levels.

There is no tiebreaker in individual competition; all tied individuals will advance.

For team competition, the score of the fourth-place individual is used as the tiebreaker. If a team has only three members it is not eligible to participate in the tiebreaker. If the fourth-place score still results in a tie, the individual tiebreaker rules will not apply, and all remaining tied teams will advance. At the state level ties for first place are not broken.

For district, regional, and state meet academic championship and sweepstakes awards, points are awarded to the school as follows:

- Individual places: 1st—15, 2nd—12, 3rd—10, 4th—8, 5th—6, and 6th—4.
- Team places: 1st—10 and 2nd—5.
- The maximum number of points a school can earn in Accounting is 55.

== List of prior winners ==
=== Individual ===
NOTE: For privacy reasons, only the winning school is shown.

NOTE: UIL Reclassification happened in 2015, adding the 6A classification.

Year	Class A	Class AA	Class AAA	Class AAAA	Class AAAAA	Class AAAAAA
1987	Menard	Florence	Dalhart	Monahans	Wichita Falls Rider	N/A
1988	Happy	Troup	Orangefield	Wichita Falls	Round Rock Westwood	N/A
1989	Abbott	Olney	Falfurrias	Port Neches-Groves	Converse Judson	N/A
1990	Jayton	(tie) Brackettville/Overton	Gonzales	Midlothian	Wichita Falls Rider	N/A
1991	Abbott	Rosebud-Lott	Orangefield	Stephenville	Duncanville	N/A
1992	Trenton	Cooper	Troy	Mineral Wells	Weslaco	N/A
1993	Trenton	Rosebud-Lott	Ferris	Livingston	Abilene	N/A
1994	Lazbuddie	Rosebud-Lott	Mont Belvieu Barbers Hill	Port Neches-Groves	Duncanville	N/A
1995	Lazbuddie	Idalou	Friona	Rockwall	Fort Worth Paschal	N/A
1996	Lazbuddie	Rosebud-Lott	Mont Belvieu Barbers Hill	Carthage	Humble Kingwood	N/A
1997	Era	Rosebud-Lott	Dalhart	Canyon Randall	Abilene	N/A
1998	Era	Stamford	Dalhart	Kaufman	Abilene	N/A
1999	Lazbuddie	Rosebud-Lott	Dalhart	Snyder	Abilene	N/A
2000	Lazbuddie	Rosebud-Lott	Hamshire-Fannett	Lockhart	Abilene	N/A
2001	Lazbuddie	Rosebud-Lott	Cameron Yoe	North Lamar	Abilene	N/A
2002	Trenton	Rosebud-Lott	Giddings	Snyder	Fort Bend Dulles	N/A
2003	Trenton	Rosebud-Lott	Cameron Yoe	Brownwood	Southlake Carroll	N/A
2004	Lazbuddie	Caddo Mills	Hamshire-Fannett	Brownwood	Southlake Carroll	N/A
2005	Trenton	Rosebud-Lott	Dalhart	Brownwood	Keller	N/A
2006	Loop	Rosebud-Lott	Dalhart	Brownwood	Keller	N/A
2007	Sudan	Tuscola Jim Ned	Giddings	Mesquite Poteet	Keller	N/A
2008	Sudan	Tuscola Jim Ned	Snyder	Brownwood	Keller	N/A
2009	Sudan	Tuscola Jim Ned/Caddo Mills (tie)	Dalhart	Hallsville	Edinburg	N/A
2010	Happy	Grandview/Rosebud-Lott (tie)	Giddings	Granbury	Laredo United	N/A
2011	Happy	Rosebud-Lott	Longview Spring Hill	Azle	Round Rock	N/A
2012	Happy	Caddo Mills	Paris	Granbury	Lewisville	N/A
2013	Stamford	Caddo Mills	Paris	Cleburne	Cypress Woods	N/A
2014	Sabine Pass	Caddo Mills	Giddings	Magnolia	Fort Bend Dulles	N/A
2015	Happy	Sabine Pass	Lexington	Giddings	Magnolia	Kingwood
2016	Happy	Sabine Pass	Pollock Central	Mabank	New Caney	Keller
2017	Brookesmith	Sabine Pass	Holliday	Caddo Mills	Hereford	Laredo United South
2018	Happy	Sabine Pass	Pollock Central	Atlanta/Atlanta (Tie)	Hallsville	Lufkin
2019	Jayton	Gladewater Union Grove	Idalou	Argyle	Hallsville	Cypress Woods
2021	Happy	Vega	Holliday	Andrews	Kerrville Tivy	Keller
2022	Happy	Vega	Pollock Central	Argyle	Friendswood	Cypress Woods

=== Team ===
NOTE: UIL did not recognize a team championship in this event until the 1992-93 scholastic year.

NOTE: UIL Reclassification happened in 2015, adding the 6A classification.

NOTE: Highest score across all classification shown in bold.

Year	Class A	Class AA	Class AAA	Class AAAA	Class AAAAA	Class AAAAAA
1993	Lazbuddie	**Rosebud-Lott**	Cameron Yoe	Dayton	Abilene	N/A
1994	**Lazbuddie**	Rosebud-Lott	Mont Belvieu Barbers Hill	Sulphur Springs	Duncanville	N/A
1995	Lazbuddie	**Rosebud-Lott**	Mont Belvieu Barbers Hill	Rockwall	Duncanville	N/A
1996	Lazbuddie	**Rosebud-Lott**	Mount Vernon	Rockwall	**Abilene**	N/A
1997	Lazbuddie	**Rosebud-Lott**	Dalhart	Sherman	Duncanville	N/A
1998	Trenton	Rosebud-Lott	Dalhart	Snyder	**Abilene**	N/A
1999	**Lazbuddie**	Rosebud-Lott	Dalhart	Los Fresnos	Abilene	N/A
2000	Lazbuddie	**Rosebud-Lott**	Dalhart	Sulphur Springs	Abilene	N/A
2001	Lazbuddie	Rosebud-Lott	**Cameron Yoe**	Snyder	Abilene	N/A
2002	Trenton	**Rosebud-Lott**	Giddings	Snyder	Laredo United	N/A
2003	Trenton	**Rosebud-Lott**	Cameron Yoe	Brownwood	Southlake Carroll	N/A
2004	Trenton	Rosebud-Lott	Hamshire-Fannett	Cleburne	**Southlake Carroll**	N/A
2005	Trenton	**Rosebud-Lott**	Dalhart	Brownwood	Keller	N/A
2006	Trenton	**Rosebud-Lott**	Dalhart	Brownwood	Keller	N/A
2007	Trenton	**Tuscola Jim Ned**	Hamshire-Fannett	Brownwood	Keller	N/A
2008	Happy	**Rosebud-Lott**	Hamshire-Fannett	Brownwood	Keller	N/A
2009	Happy	**Rosebud-Lott**	Snyder	Magnolia	Fort Bend Dulles	N/A
2010	Happy	Grandview	Giddings	**Granbury**	Laredo United	N/A
2011	Happy	**Rosebud-Lott**	Giddings	Granbury	Fort Bend Dulles	N/A
2012	Happy	**Caddo Mills**	Argyle	Granbury	Fort Bend Dulles	N/A
2013	Sabine Pass	Caddo Mills	Giddings	**Cleburne**	Keller	N/A
2014	Sabine Pass	**Caddo Mills**	Giddings	Cleburne	Fort Bend Dulles	N/A
2015	Happy	Gladewater Union Grove	Jim Ned	**Giddings**	Magnolia	Kingwood
2016	Happy	Sabine Pass	Caddo Mills	Giddings	**Hereford**	Naaman Forest
2017	Happy	Sabine Pass	Pollock Central	Argyle	**Hereford**	North Shore
2018	Happy	Sabine Pass	Pollock Central	Atlanta	Hereford	**Luffkin**
2019	Happy	Vega	Atlanta	Argyle	**Luffkin**	Cypress Woods
2021	Happy	Gladewater Union Grove	Pollock Central	**Argyle**	Lubbock Coronado	Keller
2022	Happy	Vega	**Pollock Central**	**Argyle**	Kerrville Tivy	Houston Kerr
