= Lone Star Cup =

The Texas Lone Star Cup is given by the University Interscholastic League (UIL) and is based on a school district’s combined academic and athletic achievements. All UIL member high schools in good academic and athletic eligibility standing will be included for contention.

== What the UIL recognizes ==
This annual program recognizes six high schools, one in each of the six UIL classifications (6A, 5A, 4A, 3A, 2A, and 1A), based on their overall team achievement in sanctioned UIL Athletic/Academic championships. As of January 1, 2023 this included:

=== Team Sports ===
- Boys' Baseball, Basketball, Football, and Soccer
- Girls' Basketball, Soccer, Softball, and Volleyball
- Tennis

=== Individual Sports ===
- Boys' Cross Country, Golf, Swimming & Diving, Tennis, Track and Field, and Wrestling
- Girls' Cross Country, Golf, Swimming & Diving, Tennis, Track and Field, and Wrestling

=== Non-Athletic Competitions ===
- Academic events included in the State Academic Meet
- Congress
- Film
- Marching Band
- Mariachi
- One-Act Play
- Robotics (FIRST and BEST)
- Spirit
- Theatrical Design

== Points and Standings ==
Standings for the Lone Star Cup are compiled via a year-long accumulation of points based on team success at the district and state level in the UIL activities listed above.

Rankings in state or national polls do not count in Lone Star Cup standings.

Lone Star Cup points are accrued as follows:

=== Athletic Contests ===
==== Team Sports ====
- Regular Season: District Championship and Play-off Berth—4
- Regular Season: Play-off Berth Only—2
- Playoffs: Each Victory or Advancement via Bye or Forfeit—2

==== Overall Team Standings in Individual Sports (State Meet only, not including Team Tennis) ====
- First Place—10
- Second Place—8
- Third Place—6
- Fourth Place—4
- Fifth Place—2

==== Team Tennis (State Meet only) ====
- State Championship—10
- State Runner-up—8
- State Semifinalist—5

=== Academic Competitions ===
==== Overall Team Standings in One Act Play (State Meet only) ====
- First Place—10
- Second Place—8
- Third Place—6

==== Academic Events ====
- District Championship—4
- Regional Championship—4
- Overall Team Standings in State Meet:
  - First Place—10
  - Second Place—8
  - Third Place—6
  - Fourth Place—4
  - Fifth Place—2

=== Music Competitions ===
==== Marching Band ====
- Area Championship—4
- Overall Standings in State Meet:
  - First Place—10
  - Second Place—8
  - Third Place—6
  - Fourth Place—4
  - Fifth Place—2

In the event of a team championship tie (common in academic events) or a tie in the final standings for the individual sports and academic competitions, the schools will split the allotted points of that place and the place immediately following.

- Example: A two-way tie for third in the Boys' Cross Country competition would result in 10 points (6 points for third place plus 4 points for fourth place) being split between the two teams; thus, each team would receive five points.

=== Official Tie Breakers ===
If two schools in the same classification finish the UIL athletic/academic year tied atop the Lone Star Cup point standings, the overall winner will be determined as follows:

- First tiebreaker—most overall state championships in all activities included in the Lone Star Cup program
- Second tiebreaker—most total points received at the State Academic Meet
- Third tiebreaker—most district championships in team sports included in the Lone Star Cup program

== Prior Lone Star Cup Champions ==
The award began with the 1997–98 school year.

School Year	Class A	Class 2A	Class 3A	Class 4A	Class 5A	Class 6A (2014-)
1997-98	(tie) Karnack/Windthorst	Hamilton	(tie) Aledo/Dripping Springs	Highland Park	Churchill	-
1998-99	Windthorst	Holliday	Sweeny	Highland Park	Kingwood	-
1999-2000	Karnack	Holliday	Wimberley	Highland Park	Churchill	-
2000-01	Shiner	Celina	Wylie (Abilene)	Southlake Carroll	Kingwood	-
2001-02	Shiner	Holliday	Atlanta	Southlake Carroll	Westlake	-
2002-03	Windthorst	Weimar	Canyon	Highland Park	Kingwood	-
2003-04	Windthorst	Holliday	Canyon	Highland Park	Kingwood	-
2004-05	Windthorst	Holliday	Canyon	Highland Park	Kingwood	-
2005-06	Lindsay	Argyle	Wylie (Abilene)	Highland Park	The Woodlands	-
2006-07	Lindsay	Tatum	Canyon	Highland Park	Plano West	-
2007-08	Lindsay	Salado (Note: In 2007-2008, Salado and Poth tied with 60 points. Salado won on the tiebreaker of number of state championships won that year – it won two (Boys' Golf and Baseball) while Poth did not win any.)	Canyon	Highland Park	The Woodlands	-
2008-09	Lindsay	Brock	Argyle	Friendswood	The Woodlands	-
2009-10	Cayuga	Brock	Lovejoy	Friendswood	The Woodlands	-
2010-11	Lindsay	Yoe	Lovejoy	Champion	The Woodlands	-
2011-12	Lindsay	White Oak	Argyle	Lake Travis	Southlake Carroll	-
2011-12	Lindsay	White Oak	Argyle	Lake Travis	Southlake Carroll	-
2012-13	Weimar	Salado	Argyle	Cedar Park	Southlake Carroll	-
2013-14	Weimar	Salado	Argyle	Friendswood	Southlake Carroll	-
2014-15	Cross Plains	Shiner	Brock	Argyle	Vandegrift	Southlake Carroll
2015-16	Happy	Windthorst	Brock	Argyle	Vandegrift	Westlake
2016-17	Nazareth	Sundown	Wall	Argyle	Highland Park	The Woodlands
2017-18	Nazareth	Mason	Brock	Argyle	Prosper	The Woodlands
2018-19	Nazareth	Mason	Brock	Argyle	Highland Park	Southlake Carroll
2019-20	not awarded (Note: The 2019-2020 UIL Lone Star Cup was not awarded due to the interruption of spring events due to the COVID-19 pandemic)					
2020-21	Nazareth	Shiner	Brock	Argyle	Highland Park	The Woodlands
2021-22	Abbott	Mason	Lorena	Argyle	Highland Park	Southlake Carroll
2022-23	Nazareth	Mason	Gunter	Randall	Argyle	The Woodlands
