= List of Texas UIL One-Act Play winners =

This is a list of prior winners of the Texas University Interscholastic League's annual State One-Act Play competition. Information can be found on the official UIL website under “One Act Play & Theatrical Design State Program” on page 60.

Year	Conference	School	Play
1926–1927		Mexia	Riders To The Sea
1927–1928		Plainview	The Valiant
1928–1929		Fort Worth Central	The Sponge
1929–1930		Abilene	The High Heart
1930–1931		Austin	Casualties
1931–1932		San Antonio Brackenridge	The Hour Glass
1932–1933		Crowell	The Severed Cord
1933–1934		Pampa	Smokescreen
1934–1935		Mission	Sparkin'
1935–1936		El Paso	The Last Flight Over
1936–1937		Pampa	Cabbages
1937–1938		El Paso	Pyramus and Thisbe
1938–1939		Wichita Falls	The Happy Journey
1939–1940		San Marcos	Sparkin'
1940–1941		Waco	Beauty And The Jacobin
1941–1942		Waco	The Happy Journey
1942–1943		Abilene	John Doe
1943–1944		Dallas Sunset	Road Into The Sun
1944–1945		Fort Davis	On Vengeance Height
1945–1946		Abilene	Our Town - Act 2
1946–1947		Dallas Sunset	Balcony Scene
1947–1948	1A	West Columbia	Mr. Lincoln's Whiskers
1947–1948	2A	Denton	Mooncalf Mugford
1947–1948	B	Schulenburg	High Window
1947–1948	City	Houston Lamar	The High Heart
1948–1949	1A	Cuero	The Undercurrent
1948–1949	2A	Abilene	The Skin of Our Teeth - Act 1
1948–1949	B	White Deer	The Wasp
1948–1949	City	Houston Milby	The Pot Boiler
1949–1950	1A	Cuero	The Enemy - Act 2
1949–1950	2A	Abilene	The Long Christmas Dinner
1949–1950	B	Schulenburg	Mooncalf Mugford
1949–1950	City	Houston Davis	The Last Flight Over
1950–1951	1A	Cuero	sf All My Sons
1950–1951	2A	Houston Davis	Minnie Field
1950–1951	B	Schulenburg	Six Who Pass While The Lentils Boil
1951–1952	1A	Jacksonville	The Undercurrent
1951–1952	2A	Port Arthur	The Glass Menagerie- Act 3
1951–1952	B	Greggton Pine Tree	Fog on The Valley
1952–1953	1A	Cuero	sf The Little Foxes
1952–1953	2A	Port Arthur Jefferson	The Old Lady Shows Her Medals
1952–1953	B	Houston Spring Branch	Minor Miracle
1953–1954	1A	White Deer	Aria Da Capo
1953–1954	2A	Houston Reagan	The Lottery
1953–1954	B	McCamey	sf Home of the Brave
1954–1955	1A	Georgetown	A Sunny Morning
1954–1955	2A	Houston Lamar	Our Town - Act 2
1954–1955	B	Houston Cy-Fair	Minnie Field
1955–1956	1A	Jacksonville	The No 'Count Boy
1955–1956	2A	Houston Lamar	sf I remember Mama
1955–1956	B	White Deer	The Maker of Dreams
1956–1957	1A	A&M Consolidated	The Proposal
1956–1957	2A	Houston Lamar	sf Years Ago
1956–1957	B	Carrizo Springs	sf The Barrets of Wimpole Street
1957–1958	1A	Georgetown	The Wonder Hat
1957–1958	2A	Houston Lamar	sf A roomful of Roses
1957–1958	B	Alpine	sf Dino
1958–1959	1A	McLean	sf The Glass Menagerie
1958–1959	2A	League City Clear Creek	The Pot Boiler
1958–1959	3A	La Marque	The World of Shalom Aleichem
1958–1959	4A	Houston	sf Dark of The Moon
1958–1959	B	Rankin	A Sunny Morning
1959–1960	1A	Mathis	sf The Curious Savage
1959–1960	2A	Schulenburg	Gammer Gurton's Needle
1959–1960	3A	Jacksonville	Cry, The Beloved Country
1959–1960	4A	Houston Bellaire	Stella For a Star
1959–1960	B	Rankin	The Twelve-Pound Look
1960–1961	1A	Rankin	sf Antigone
1960–1961	2A	Gladewater	Riders to The Sea
1960–1961	3A	San Benito	sf The World of Sholom Aleichem
1960–1961	4A	Houston Lamar	sf Ah, Wilderness!
1960–1961	B	Menard	sf Medea
1961–1962	1A	Grapeland	Whispering Images
1961–1962	2A	A&M Consolidated	The Bald Soprano
1961–1962	3A	League City Clear Creek	The Small World of Millie McIvor
1961–1962	4A	Houston Bellaire	Of Poems, Youth and Spring
1961–1962	B	Menard	In The Shadow of The Glen
1962–1963	1A	Clyde	Box and Cox
1962–1963	2A	A&M Consolidated	sf Anastasia
1962–1963	3A	League City Clear Creek	Splendor of Springtime
1962–1963	4A	El Paso Austin	sf The Miracle Worker
1962–1963	B	Menard	A Sunny Morning
1963–1964	1A	Schulenburg	Ralph Roister Doister
1963–1964	2A	Canyon	sf Othello
1963–1964	3A	League City Clear Creek	Hopes and Words and Ordinary Things
1963–1964	4A	Abilene Cooper	sf Becket
1963–1964	B	Menard	This Bull Ate Nutmeg
1964–1965	1A	White Deer	MacBeth
1964–1965	2A	Georgetown	The Romancers, Act 1
1964–1965	3A	McKinney	sf Waiting for Godot
1964–1965	4A	Houston Bellaire	sf A Midsummer Night's Dream
1964–1965	B	Blooming Grove	sf Our American Cousin
1965–1966	1A	Winnie East Chambers	sf Anastasia
1965–1966	2A	Mason	The Devil & Daniel Webster
1965–1966	3A	San Antonio Houston	sf The House of Bernarda Alba
1965–1966	4A	Houston Bellaire	sf The Imaginary Invalid
1965–1966	B	Hico	The Heritage of Wimpole Street
1966–1967	1A	Goldthwaite	Impromptu
1966–1967	2A	Gladewater	Archy and Mehitabel
1966–1967	3A	Brownwood	sf The Cave Dwellers
1966–1967	4A	Houston Waltrip	sf Dinny and The Witches
1966–1967	B	Danbury	The Farce of The Worthy Master
1967–1968	1A	Grapeland	Everyman
1967–1968	2A	San Antonio Randolph	The Ugly Duckling
1967–1968	3A	Snyder	sf The Crucible
1967–1968	4A	Houston Bellaire	Infancy
1967–1968	B	Meadow	sf Boy With a Cart
1968–1969	1A	Happy	sf The Trojan Women
1968–1969	2A	Olney	sf Exit the King
1968–1969	3A	Dickinson	sf Reynard the Fox
1968–1969	4A	Amarillo Tascosa	sf Exit the King
1968–1969	B	Meadow	Children on Their Birthdays
1969–1970	1A	Roscoe	Alice in Wonderland
1969–1970	2A	Katy	sf The Crucible
1969–1970	3A	Sydney	sf Elizabeth The Queen
1969–1970	4A	Houston Spring Branch	sf Mother Courage and Her Children
1969–1970	B	Meadow	sf A Company of Wayward Saints
1970–1971	1A	Sonora	sf The Madwoman of Chaillot
1970–1971	2A	Denver City	Infancy
1970–1971	3A	Snyder	sf Maria Stuart
1970–1971	4A	Amarillo Tascosa	sf Oedipus The King
1970–1971	B	Meadow	sf A War Movie
1971–1972	1A	Lubbock Cooper	sf A Gap in Generations
1971–1972	2A	Universal City Randolph	Of Poems, Youth, And Spring
1971–1972	3A	Snyder	sf Ondine
1971–1972	4A	Abilene	The Long Christmas Dinner
1971–1972	B	Meadow	sf Tartuffe
1972–1973	1A	Sonora	The Apollo of Bellac
1972–1973	2A	Universal City Randolph	Antic Spring
1972–1973	3A	LaPorte	Androcles and The Lion
1972–1973	4A	Richardson Pearce	Interview
1972–1973	B	Imperial Buena Vista	Good-Bye To the Clown
1973–1974	1A	Sabinal	The No 'Count Boy
1973–1974	2A	Katy	sf Androcles and The Lion
1973–1974	3A	LaPorte	sf Reynard The Fox
1973–1974	4A	Waco Richfield	sf Exit The King
1973–1974	B	Meadow	sf A Servant of Two Masters
1974–1975	1A	Farmersville	sf Reynard the Fox
1974–1975	2A	Nocona	sf Luther
1974–1975	3A	Longview Pine Tree	sf The Great Cross-Country Race
1974–1975	4A	Houston Williams	sf The Amen Corner
1974–1975	B	Prairie Lea	sf The Great Cross-Country Race
1975–1976	1A	Coppell	Plaza Suite - Act 3
1975–1976	2A	Winnie East Chambers	sf A Company of Wayward Saints
1975–1976	3A	Snyder	sf Blood Wedding
1975–1976	4A	Richardson	sf The Comedy of Errors
1975–1976	B	Penelope	The Small World of Millie Mc Ivor
1976–1977	1A	Coppell	sf The Odd Couple
1976–1977	2A	Boys Ranch	sf Luther
1976–1977	3A	Snyder	sf Romeo and Juliet
1976–1977	4A	La Marque	sf J. B.
1976–1977	B	Meadow	The Seprent
1977–1978	1A	Longview Spring Hill	sf Present Laughter
1977–1978	2A	Bastrop	sf Once upon A Clothesline
1977–1978	3A	Carrollton Smith	sf Alice in Wonderland
1977–1978	4A	San Antonio MacArthur	sf Hamlet, The Time is Out of Joint: A Study of Hamlet
1977–1978	B	Channing	Of Poems, Youth and Spring
1978–1979	1A	Pottsboro	The Interview
1978–1979	2A	Boys Ranch	sf Indians
1978–1979	3A	Snyder	sf Macbeth
1978–1979	4A	San Antonio MacArthur	sf Oedipus Rex
1978–1979	B	Channing	Mannequins' Demise
1979–1980	1A	Longview Spring Hill	sf The Curious Savage
1979–1980	2A	Caldwell	sf The Lark
1979–1980	3A	Gregory-Portland	sf The Taming of The Shrew
1979–1980	4A	Carrollton Smith	sf The Prime of Miss Jean Brodie
1979–1980	B	Sanderson	sf The Glass Menagerie
1980–1981	1A	Penelope	Foiled by an Innocent Maid
1980–1981	2A	Ropesville Ropes	sf The Arkansaw Bear
1980–1981	3A	Clyde	sf Charley's Aunt
1980–1981	4A	League City Clear Lake	sf Idiot's Delight
1980–1981	5A	San Antonio Clark	sf Equus
1981–1982	1A	Throckmorton	The Sisters Mc Intosh
1981–1982	2A	Weimar	Plaza Suite: Visitor From Forest Hills
1981–1982	3A	Clyde	sf The Hast Heart
1981–1982	4A	Snyder	sf AH, Wilderness
1981–1982	5A	Deer Park	sf The Diviners
1982–1983	1A	Port Aransas	sf The Elephant Man
1982–1983	2A	Van Horn	sf Tevya & His Daughters
1982–1983	3A	Muleshoe	sf The Royal Hunt of The Sun
1982–1983	4A	Katy Taylor	sf The Imaginary Invalid
1982–1983	5A	LaPorte	sf A Doctor In Spite of Himself
1983–1984	1A	Sabine Pass	sf The Adding Machine
1983–1984	2A	La Vernia	sf Alice in Wonderland
1983–1984	3A	Caldwell	sf The Trojan Women
1983–1984	4A	Snyder	sf The Crucible
1983–1984	5A	League City Clear Lake	sf Children of A Lesser God
1984–1985	1A	Ropesville Ropes	sf I Remember Mama
1984–1985	2A	Austin Lake Travis	Plaza Suite: Visitor From Forest Hills
1984–1985	3A	Muleshoe	sf The Tragedy of King Lear
1984–1985	4A	Snyder	sf Romeo and Juliet
1984–1985	5A	Houston Eisenhower	sf Total Abandon
1985–1986	1A	Port Aransas	sf As you Like It
1985–1986	2A	Shallowater	sf The Diviners
1985–1986	3A	Red Oak	sf The Miracle Worker
1985–1986	4A	Gregory-Portland	sf The Desk Set
1985–1986	5A	San Antonio MacArthur	sf The Life And Adventures of Nicholas Nickleby
1986–1987	1A	Port Aransas	sf Threads
1986–1987	2A	Canadian	sf What I Did Last Summer
1986–1987	3A	Mineola	sf Amadeus
1986–1987	4A	Gregory-Portland	sf Noises Off
1986–1987	5A	Klein	sf Awake and Sing
1987–1988	1A	Sabine Pass	sf Twelve Angry Jurors
1987–1988	2A	Cooper	sf Tevya And His Daughters
1987–1988	3A	Mineola	sf Man of La Mancha
1987–1988	4A	Snyder	sf The Corn is Green
1987–1988	5A	League City Clear Lake	sf Black Angel
1988–1989	1A	Port Aransas	sf I Remember Mama
1988–1989	2A	Marion	sf All My Sons
1988–1989	3A	Mineola	sf And People All Around
1988–1989	4A	Gregory-Portland	sf I'm Not Rappaport
1988–1989	5A	Klein Oak	sf A Lie of The Mind
1989–1990	1A	Thorndale	The Near-Sighted Knight and The Far-Sighted Dragon
1989–1990	2A	Seagraves	sf The Runner Stumbles
1989–1990	3A	Mineola	sf The Man Who Never Died
1989–1990	4A	Gregory-Portland	sf )One Flew Over The Cuckoo's Nest
1989–1990	5A	Conroe McCullough	sf Look Homeward Angel
1990–1991	1A	Ropesville Ropes	sf Arsenic And Old Lace
1990–1991	2A	Boys Ranch	sf Volpone
1990–1991	3A	Mineola	sf The Sparks Fly Upward
1990–1991	4A	Katy Taylor	sf The Good Woman of Setzuan
1990–1991	5A	San Antonio MacArthur	sf The Beggar's Opera
1991–1992	1A	Trent	sf Of Mice and Men
1991–1992	2A	Seagraves	sf Death of a Salesman
1991–1992	3A	Cameron Yoe	sf Inherit The Wind
1991–1992	4A	Mineral Wells	sf The Boys Next Door
1991–1992	5A	Euless Trinity	sf You Can't Take It With You
1992–1993	1A	Munday	sf Daddy's Dyin' (Who's Got The Will?)
1992–1993	2A	Wimberley	sf Dark of The Moon
1992–1993	3A	Sonora	sf The Marriage of Bette and Boo
1992–1993	4A	Snyder	sf Macbeth
1992–1993	5A	Klein	sf The Little Foxes
1993–1994	1A	Lindsay	sf The Rimers of Eldritch
1993–1994	2A	Stinnett West Texas	sf The Would-Be Gentleman
1993–1994	3A	Mineola	sf Assassins
1993–1994	4A	West Orange-Stark	sf The Foreigner
1993–1994	5A	San Angelo Central	sf The Lion in Winter
1994–1995	1A	Rule	sf Steel Magnolias
1994–1995	2A	Yorktown	The Actor's Nightmare
1994–1995	3A	Mineola	sf The Devils
1994–1995	4A	Snyder	sf A Midsummer Night's Dream
1994–1995	5A	Hurst Bell	sf Black Angel
1995–1996	1A	Trent	sf The Foreigner
1995–1996	2A	Diana New Diana	sf Breaking The Prairie Wolf Code
1995–1996	3A	Mont Belvieu Barbers Hill	sf Strider
1995–1996	4A	Friendswood	sf The Life And Adventures of Nicholas Nickleby
1995–1996	5A	Arlington Martin	sf Our Country's Good
1996–1997	1A	Overton	Confederate Letters
1996–1997	2A	Stinnett West Texas	I Pagliacci
1996–1997	3A	Bishop	sf Into The Woods
1996–1997	4A	Gregory-Portland	sf Conversations With My Father
1996–1997	5A	Plano	sf Six Degrees of Separation
1997–1998	1A	Whiteface	sf Tom Jones
1997–1998	2A	Stinnett West Texas	Gianni Schicchi
1997–1998	3A	Lake Dallas	sf The King Stag
1997–1998	4A	La Marque	sf The Imaginary Invalid or The Hypochondriac
1997–1998	5A	Arlington Martin	sf A View From The Bridge
1998–1999	1A	Roscoe Highland	sf The King Stag
1998–1999	2A	Diana New Diana	Peer Gynt
1998–1999	3A	Mont Belvieu Barbers Hill	sf The Caucasian Chalk Circle
1998–1999	4A	Bay City	sf The Miracle Worker
1998–1999	5A	San Antonio Madison	sf The Cripple of Inishmaan
1999–2000	1A	Highland	sf Becoming Memories
1999–2000	2A	Diana New Diana	sf Voice of the Prairie
1999–2000	3A	Mount Vernon	sf Of Mice and Men
1999–2000	4A	Kerrville Tivy	sf And They Dance Real Slow in Jackson
1999–2000	5A	Conroe The Woodlands	sf The Shadow Box
2000–2001	1A	Follett	sf Sylvia
2000–2001	2A	Comfort	sf A Midsummer Night's Dream
2000–2001	3A	Wimberley	sf The Trojan Women
2000–2001	4A	Southlake Carroll	sf Paganini
2000–2001	5A	Carrollton Creekview	sf Side Man
2001–2002	1A	Yantis	sf The Boys Next Door
2001–2002	2A	Rogers	sf Lucia Mad
2001–2002	3A	Van	sf Godspell
2001–2002	4A	Gregory-Portland	sf Over The River and Through The Woods
2001–2002	5A	Galveston Ball	sf The Playboy of the Western World
2002–2003	1A	Lindsay	sf The Voice of the Prairie
2002–2003	2A	Omaha Paul Pewitt	sf Dancing at Lughnasa
2002–2003	3A	Mont Belvieu Barbers Hill	sf Strider
2002–2003	4A	Bay City	sf The Grapes of Wrath
2002–2003	5A	Humble Kingwood	sf Black Snow
2003–2004	1A	Lindsay	sf The Caucasian Chalk Circle
2003–2004	2A	Diana New Diana	sf Quilters
2003–2004	3A	Mount Vernon	sf The Voice of the Prairie
2003–2004	4A	Friendswood	sf Rosencrantz & Guildenstern
2003–2004	5A	Houston Bellaire	sf Tartuffe
2004–2005	1A	Lindsay	sf The Life and Adventures of Nicholas Nickleby
2004–2005	2A	Rogers	sf Players in a Game
2004–2005	3A	Van	sf The Caucasian Chalk Circle
2004–2005	4A	Longview Pine Tree	sf The Kentucky Cycle: Fire in the Hole
2004–2005	5A	Arlington	sf An Experiment With An Air Pump
2005–2006	1A	Channing	sf Flowers For Algernon
2005–2006	2A	Sonora	sf Unexpected Tenderness
2005–2006	3A	Decatur	sf The Elephant Man
2005–2006	4A	Montgomery	sf A View From The Bridge
2005–2006	5A	Plano East	sf The Marriage of Bette and Boo
2006–2007	1A	Lindsay	sf Full Circle
2006–2007	2A	Mount Pleasant Chapel Hill	sf Flowers For Algernon
2006–2007	3A	Van	sf Man of La Mancha
2006–2007	4A	Friendswood	sf Black Snow
2006–2007	5A	Temple	sf Ruthless!
2007–2008	1A	Fort Worth Acad Fine Arts	sf The Last Night of Ballyhoo
2007–2008	2A	Rogers	sf Man of La Mancha
2007–2008	3A	Mexia	sf The Kentucky Cycle: Fire in the Hole
2007–2008	4A	Schertz Clemens	sf Moon Over Buffalo
2007–2008	5A	Mansfield	sf Epic Proportions
2008–2009	1A	Lindsay	sf The Rimers of Eldritch
2008–2009	2A	Rogers	sf Ghetto
2008–2009	3A	Athens	sf Korczak's Children
2008–2009	4A	Friendswood	sf Great Expectations
2008–2009	5A	Austin	sf Over the River and Through the Woods
2009-2010	1A	Medina	sf Dancing at Lughnasa
2009-2010	2A	Salado	sf The Balkan Women
2009-2010	3A	Paris North Lamar	sf The Government Inspector
2009-2010	4A	Mont Belvieu Barbers Hill	sf The Night Thoreau Spent in Jail
2009-2010	5A	Keller	sf Richard III
2010-2011	1A	Plains	Biedermann and the Firebugs
2010-2011	2A	Hempstead	sf Moby Dick Rehearsed
2010-2011	3A	Van	sf A Midsummer Night's Dream
2010-2011	4A	Carrollton Creekview	sf Death of a Salesman
2010-2011	5A	Austin	sf Over the Tavern
2011-2012	1A	Plains	sf Henry Lumper
2011-2012	2A	Rogers	sf The Caucasian Chalk Circle
2011-2012	3A	Salado	sf The Sings of Sor Juana
2011-2012	4A	Mont Belvieu Barbers Hill	sf The Awakening of Spring
2011-2012	5A	Austin	sf King O' the Moon
2012-2013	1A	Sabine Pass	sf Wit
2012-2013	2A	Rogers	sf Kholstomer: The Story of a Horse
2012-2013	3A	Fredericksburg	sf The Miracle Worker
2012-2013	4A	Canyon Randall	sf Darkside
2012-2013	5A	Fort Bend Travis	sf Unexpected Tenderness
2013-2014	1A	Mason	sf The Last Night at Ballyhoo
2013-2014	2A	Mount Vernon	sf Unexpected Tenderness
2013-2014	3A	Seminole	sf Golden Boy
2013-2014	4A	Pearland Dawson	sf The Caucasian Chalk Circle
2013-2014	5A	Houston Carnegie Vanguard	sf When the Rain Stops Falling
2014-2015	1A	Abbott	sf The 39 Steps
2014-2015	2A	Mason	sf The Death and Life of Larry Benson
2014-2015	3A	Lago Vista	sf Over the River and Through the Woods
2014-2015	4A	Seminole	sf The Night Thoreau Spent in Jail
2014-2015	5A	Lewisville The Colony	sf The Lost Boy
2014-2015	6A	Lewisville	sf The African Company Presents Richard Richard lll
2015-2016	1A	Bryson	sf Holy Day
2015-2016	2A	Mason	sf You Can't Take it With You
2015-2016	3A	Tuscola Jim Ned	sf The Miracle Worker
2015-2016	4A	Seminole	sf A View From the Bridge
2015-2016	5A	Temple	sf Bug
2015-2016	6A	Houston Carnegie Vanguard	sf Holy Day
2016-2017	1A	Abbott	sf Shipwrecked! An Entertainment The Amazing Adventures of Louis de Rougemont (As Told by Himself)
2016-2017	2A	Brackettville Bracket	sf Golden Boy
2016-2017	3A	Kemp	sf The book of Everything
2016-2017	4A	Zapata	sf Las Soldaderas: The Female Warriors of the Mexican Revolution
2016-2017	5A	Lewisville The Colony	sf Second Samuel
2016-2017	6A	Montgomery	sf A View From The Bridge
2017-2018	1A	Trinidad	sf She Kills Monsters
2017-2018	2A	Cristoval	sf The Curious Incident of the Dog in the Night Time
2017-2018	3A	Little River Academy	sf Twentieth Century
2017-2018	4A	Crandall	sf The Book of Everything
2017-2018	5A	Corpus Christi Tuloso-Midway	sf Moon Over Buffalo
2017-2018	6A	Harlingen South	sf Side Man
2018-2019	1A	Abbott	sf Treasure Island
2018-2019	2A	Sabine Pass	sf Three Musketeers and the Princess of Spain
2018-2019	3A	Lago Vista	sf Silent Sky
2018-2019	4A	Salado	sf Blue Stockings
2018-2019	5A	Canyon Randall	sf Never the Sinner
2018-2019	6A	Keller Central	sf Euripides' Medea
2020-2021	1A	Rankin	sf The Boys Next Door
2020-2021	2A	Christoval	sf The Lost Boy
2020-2021	3A	Shallowater	sf By the Bog of Cats
2020-2021	4A	Corpus Christi Tuloso-Midway	sf Over the River and Through the Woods
2020-2021	5A	Pharr-San Juan-Alamo Southwest High School	sf Rabbit Hole
2020-2021	6A	Northside Taft	sf The Curious Incident of the Dog in the Night-time
2021-2022	1A	Abbott	sf Rosencrantz and Guildenstern are Dead
2021-2022	2A	Mason	sf The Miracle Worker
2021-2022	3A	White Oak	sf The Book Of Will
2021-2022	4A	Paris North Lamar	sf Moon Over Buffalo
2021-2022	5A	Boerne Champion	sf He Who Gets Slapped
2021-2022	6A	Fort Bend Bush	sf We Are Proud to Present a Presentation About the Herero of Namibia, Formerly Known as South West Africa, From the German Sudwestafrika, Between the Years 1884 - 1915
2022-2023	1A	Trinidad	sf Sylvia
2022-2023	2A	Christoval	sf The Red Suitcase
2022-2023	3A	Mount Vernon	sf A Monster Calls
2022-2023	4A	Canyon Randall	sf A View from the Bridge
2022-2023	5A	Harlingen South	sf Indecent
2022-2023	6A	Midland	sf The Miraculous Journey Of Edward Tulane
2023-2024	1A	Guthrie	The Beggar's Opera
2023-2024	2A	Shiner	sf Silent Sky
2023-2024	3A	Early	sf Silent Sky
2023-2024	4A	Zapata	Blood Wedding / Bodas de Sangre
2023-2024	5A	Magnolia	sf Black Snow
2023-2024	6A	Deer Park	sf The Ferryman
2024-2025	1A	Ackerly Sands	sf The Corn is Green
2024-2025	2A	Bogota Rivercrest	sf Over the River and Through the Woods
2024-2025	3A	Lexington	sf The Haystack
2024-2025	4A	Sunnyvale	sf Charles Dicken's The Life and Adventures of Nicholas Nickleby
2024-2025	5A	Harlingen South	sf 33 Variations
2024-2025	6A	Keller	sf Silent Sky
2025-2026	1A	Roscoe Highland	sf The Hidden Kennedy
2025-2026	2A	Christoval	Goodnight, Mister Tom
2025-2026	3A	Mount Vernon	sf Frankenstein
2025-2026	4A	Marble Falls	sf The Collective
2025-2026	5A	Harlingen South	sf Never the Sinner
2025-2026	6A	Harlingen	sf Mojada
