= Cross Plains High School (Texas) =

Location
- 700 North Main Street; Cross Plains, Texas 76443-2112; United States; 32.13143°N 99.16482°W

Information
- School type: Public high school
- School district: Cross Plains Independent School District
- Principal: Wesley Jones
- Teaching staff: 21.73 (FTE)
- Grades: 7-12
- Enrollment: 152 (2023–2024)
- Student to teacher ratio: 6.99
- Colors: Purple & Gold
- Athletics conference: UIL Class 2A
- Mascot: Buffalo/Lady Buffalo
- Website: Cross Plains High School

Cross Plains High School is a public high school located in Cross Plains, Texas, United States, classified as a 2A school by the University Interscholastic League. It is part of the Cross Plains Independent School District located in southeastern Callahan County. For the 2024-2025 school year, the school was given a "B" by the Texas Education Agency.

== Athletics ==
The Cross Plains Buffaloes compete in these sports -

- Baseball
- Basketball
- Cross Country
- Football
- Golf
- Softball
- Tennis
- Track and Field

=== State titles ===
- Girls Track -
  - 1994 (1A), 2014(1A/D2)
