= Number Sense (UIL) =

Number Sense is one of several academic events sanctioned by the University Interscholastic League. It is also a competition held by the Texas Math and Science Coaches Association, using the same rules as the UIL. It is one of the UIL's oldest academic competitions: the first state title was awarded in 1943.

Number Sense is designed to test students' mental math abilities (i.e., their ability to solve math problems without the aid of calculators or scratch paper).

== Eligibility ==
Students in Grade 4 through Grade 12 are eligible to enter this event. For competition purposes, separate divisions are held for Grades 4-6, Grades 7-8, and Grades 9-12, with separate subjects covered on each test as follows:

- The test for Grades 4-6 covers basic arithmetic and mathematical functions.
- The test for Grades 7-8 covers the subjects under Grades 4-6 plus algebra, geometry and number theory.
- The test for Grades 9-12 covers the subjects under both Grades 4-6 and Grades 7-8 plus analysis, trigonometry and calculus.

For Grades 4-6 and Grades 7-8 each school may send up to three students per division. In order for a school to participate in team competition in a division, the school must send three students in that division.

For Grades 9-12 each school may send up to four students; however, in districts with more than eight schools the district executive committee can limit participation to three students per school. In order for a school to participate in team competition, the school must send at least three students.

== Rules and Scoring ==
The test consists of 80 questions and is limited to only 10 minutes. There is no intermediate time signal given; at the end of 10 minutes the students must immediately stop writing (they are not allowed to finish incomplete answers started before the stop signal).

The questions must be answered in order; a skipped question is scored as a wrong answer.

Since Number Sense is designed to test students' mental math abilities, no calculators or scratch paper can be used during competition.

In order for a question to be scored as correct the exact answer must be given (no allowance for rounding), except where the question is preceded by an asterisk, in which case for the question to be scored as correct the student's answer must be within 5 percent of the exact answer.

5 points are awarded for each correct answer while 4 points are deducted for each wrong or skipped answer. However, questions not answered beyond the last attempted answer (defined as any problem where a mark or erasure exists in the answer blank for that problem) are not scored.

Another way to score the contest is to multiply the number of attempted problems by 5 and multiply the number of wrong problems by 9, and then subtracting the wrong number score from the total.

== Determining the Winner ==
=== Elementary and Junior High School ===
Scoring is posted for only the top six individual places and the top three teams.

There are no tiebreakers for either individual or team competition.

=== High School Level ===
The top three individuals and the top team (determined based on the scores of the top three individuals) advance to the next round. In addition, within each region, the highest-scoring second place team from all district competitions advances as the "wild card" to regional competition (provided the team has four members), and within the state, the highest-scoring second place team from all regional competitions advances as the wild card to the state competition. Members of advancing teams who did not place individually remain eligible to compete for individual awards at higher levels.

There is no tiebreaker for individual competition; all individuals tied for a place eligible to advance to the next level will advance.

For team competition, the score of the fourth-place individual is used as the tiebreaker. If a team has only three members it is not eligible to participate in the tiebreaker. If the fourth-place score still results in a tie, all remaining tied teams will advance. At the state level, ties for first place are not broken.

For district meet academic championship and district meet sweepstakes awards, points are awarded to the school as follows:

- Individual places: 1st—15, 2nd—12, 3rd—10, 4th—8, 5th—6, and 6th—4.
- Team places: 1st—9 and 2nd—4.
- The maximum number of points a school can earn in Number Sense is 37.

== List of prior winners ==
NOTE: Due to the COVID-19 Pandemic, there were no competitions held during the 2019-2020 academic year.

=== Individual ===
NOTE: For privacy reasons, only the winning school is shown. There was only one state champion for all classes awarded from 1943-44 through 1945-46 (for table purposes the winner is shown in Class A). Beginning in 1946-47, there were three champions crowned (Classes B, A, and AA; the latter encompassing all schools not in Class A or Class B). Beginning in 1958-59 all five classes (B, A, AA, AAA, and AAAA) were eligible for championships. The classifications were renumbered in 1980-81, with Class B becoming Class A and the other classes adding one letter (thus, Class A became Class AA, and so forth). Effective as of 2015, classifications were moved up by one letter with the creation of Class AAAAAA.

School Year	Class A	Class AA	Class AAA	Class AAAA	Class AAAAA	Class AAAAAA
1943-44	Forney	(none)	(none)	(none)	(none)	(none)
1944-45	Amarillo	(none)	(none)	(none)	(none)	(none)
1945-46	Rio Hondo	(none)	(none)	(none)	(none)	(none)
1946-47	Rio Hondo	(none)	(none)	(none)	(none)	(none)
1947-48	(tie) Claude/Moulton	Marble Falls	Lubbock	(none)	(none)	(none)
1948-49	(tie) Alpine/Woodsboro	Marble Falls	(tie) Lubbock/Sweetwater	(none)	(none)	(none)
1949-50	Miami	Marble Falls	El Paso	(none)	(none)	(none)
1950-51	Alpine	Pharr-San Juan-Alamo	El Paso	(none)	(none)	(none)
1951-52	Woodson	Hereford	El Paso	(none)	(none)	(none)
1952-53	Schulenburg	Taylor	El Paso	(none)	(none)	(none)
1953-54	Giddings	Llano	El Paso	(none)	(none)	(none)
1954-55	Dayton	Floydada	Pharr-San Juan-Alamo	(none)	(none)	(none)
1955-56	Sugar Land	Bowie	Kerrville	(none)	(none)	(none)
1956-57	Van Horn	Granbury	Lubbock Monterey	(none)	(none)	(none)
1957-58	Anton	Liberty	Lubbock	(none)	(none)	(none)
1958-59	Mont Belview Barbers Hill	Canadian	Lampasas	Cleburne	Austin McCallum	(none)
1959-60	Sulphur Bluff	Groesbeck	Granbury	Pharr-San Juan-Alamo	Lubbock Monterey	(none)
1960-61	Anton	White Oak	College Station A&M Consolidated	Andrews	Port Neches	(none)
1961-62	Rochelle	Mont Belvieu Barbers Hill	College Station A&M Consolidated	Cleburne	Lubbock	(none)
1962-63	Sulphur Bluff	Schulenburg	College Station A&M Consolidated	Deer Park	Lubbock Monterey	(none)
1963-64	Adrian	Schulenburg	San Saba	Wichita Falls Rider	Lubbock Monterey	(none)
1964-65	Rocksprings	Alto	San Saba	Andrews	San Antonio MacArthur	(none)
1965-66	Rocksprings	Stockdale	Pittsburg	Andrews	Freeport Brazosport	(none)
1966-67	Rocksprings	Silverton	Quanah	Andrews	Freeport Brazosport	(none)
1967-68	Whiteface	Silverton	Quanah	Andrews	Wichita Falls Rider	(none)
1968-69	Imperial Buena Vista	Wink	Quanah	Levelland	Odessa Permian	(none)
1969-70	Rocksprings	Wink	Winnie East Chambers	Bishop	Midland Lee	(none)
1970-71	Wall	Cedar Hill	Quanah	Andrews	Austin McCallum	(none)
1971-72	Wall	Granger	Waco Robinson	Andrews	Fort Worth Paschal	(none)
1972-73	Jayton	Wall	Waco Robinson	Andrews	McAllen	(none)
1973-74	Brookesmith	Wink	Zapata	Andrews	Pasadena South Houston	(none)
1974-75	Matador Motley County	Poth	Zapata	Andrews	Stafford Dulles	(none)
1975-76	S&S Consolidated	Poth	Zapata	Andrews	Austin Anderson	(none)
1976-77	Bronte	Tatum	Crane	Edcouch-Elsa	North Mesquite	(none)
1977-78	S&S Consolidated	Lorenzo	Boerne	Andrews	Edinburg	(none)
1978-79	Lorenzo	Powderly North Lamar	Silsbee	San Antonio Marshall	Moulton	(none)
1979-80	Graford	Shamrock	North Lamar	Hallsville	Edinburg	(none)
1980-81	Pottsville	Shamrock	North Lamar	Andrews	San Antonio Marshall	(none)
1981-82	(tie) Granger/Midland Greenwood	Shamrock	North Lamar	Andrews	McAllen Memorial	(none)
1982-83	Phillips	Anson	North Lamar	Azle	Houston Waltrip	(none)
1983-84	Lenorah Grady	Anson	North Lamar	San Antonio Edgewood	Alvin	(none)
1984-85	Nueces Canyon	Shamrock	Mission Sharyland	Azle	Brazoswood	(none)
1985-86	(tie) Lenorah Grady/San Isidro	(tie) Quitman/Springlake-Earth	Gladewater	Azle	Lubbock Monterey	(none)
1986-87	Plains	Springlake-Earth	Quitman	Azle	Klein Oak	(none)
1987-88	Meridian	Rosebud-Lott	Orangefield	Wichita Falls Hirschi	Klein Oak	(none)
1988-89	Mounton	Shallowater	Quitman	Wichita Falls Hirschi	Longview	(none)
1989-90	Plains	Shallowater	Bishop	Wichita Falls Hirschi	(tie) Longview/Lubbock/Mission	(none)
1990-91	San Isidro	Ingram Tom Moore	Bandera	Azle	Mission	(none)
1991-92	San Isidro	Shallowater	Devine	Wichita Falls	Mission	(none)
1992-93	San Isidro	Stamford	Mont Belvieu Barbers Hill	Wichita Falls	Wichita Falls Rider	(none)
1993-94	Sterling City	Salado	Mont Belvieu Barbers Hill	Buda Hays Consolidated	Wichita Falls Rider	(none)
1994-95	Wink	Salado	Bridgeport	Wichita Falls	Wichita Falls Rider	(none)
1995-96	Henrietta Midway	Salado	Bridgeport	Corpus Christi Flour Bluff	Sugar Land Elkins	(none)
1996-97	Henrietta Midway	Lockney	Port Isabel	Sweeny	Spring Westfield	(none)
1997-98	Henrietta Midway	Wellington	Bridgeport	Sweeny	Mission	(none)
1998-99	Valley View	De Leon	Sweeny	Edcouch-Elsa	Mission	(none)
1999-2000	Muenster	Elkhart	Bridgeport	Pharr-San Juan-Alamo Memorial	Spring Westfield	(none)
2000-01	Muenster	Elkhart	Seminole	Pharr-San Juan-Alamo Memorial	Edinburg North	(none)
2001-02	Muenster	Salado	(tie) Falfurrias/Seminole	Corpus Christi Flour Bluff	Klein	(none)
2002-03	Tenaha	Salado	Bridgeport	Pharr-San Juan Alamo Memorial	Edinburg North	(none)
2003-04	San Isidro	Salado	Bridgeport	Wichita Falls Hirschi	Pearland	(none)
2004-05	Lindsay	Argyle	Bridgeport	Medina Valley	Pearland	(none)
2005-06	Utopia	Argyle	Longview Spring Hill	Nacogdoches	Pearland	(none)
2006-07	Plains	Wichita Falls City View	Longview Spring Hill	Port Lavaca Calhoun	Clements	(none)
2007-08	Lindsay	Caddo Mills	Argyle	Nederland	Klein	(none)
2008-09	Lindsay	Caddo Mills	Wichita Falls Hirschi	Big Spring	Clements	(none)
2009-10	Lindsay	Salado	Wichita Falls Hirschi	Pearland	Clements	(none)
2010-11	Lovelady	Daingerfield	Wichita Falls Hirschi	Pearland	Clements	(none)
2011-12	Sands	Daingerfield	Argyle	Whitehouse	Dulles	(none)
2012-13	Lindsay	Abernathy	Argyle	Whitehouse	Dallas Science & Engineering	(none)
2013-14	Lovelady	Abernathy	Argyle	Veterans Memorial	Clements	(none)
2014-15	Garden City	Lindsay	City Views	Argyle	Veterans Memorial	Klein
2015-16	Knippa	Lindsay	Queen City	Argyle	Hallsville	Klein
2016-17	Bellevue	Lindsay	Queen City	Argyle	Sharyland	Klein
2017-18	Bellevue	Lindsay	City Views	Argyle	Highland Park	Clements
2018-19	Bellevue	Poolville	Gladewater Sabine	Wichita Falls Hirschi	Highland Park	Clements
2019-20	(none)	(none)	(none)	(none)	(none)	(none)
2020-21	Jonesboro	Woodsboro	Gladewater Sabine	Salado	Highland Park	Clements
2021-22	Jonesboro	Woodsboro	Idalou	Salado	Highland Park	Clements
2022-23	Jonesboro	Woodsboro	Mission Collegiate	Dallas Science & Engineering	Sharyland Pioneer	Klein Cain
2023-24	Jonesboro	Mart	Mission Collegiate	Dallas Science & Engineering	Grapevine	Clements
2024-25	Knippa	Shelbyville	Gladewater Sabine	Port Lavaca Calhoun	Hallsville	Clements
2025-26	Knippa	Mart	Gladewater Sabine	Stafford	Grapevine	Katy Seven Lakes

=== Team ===
NOTE: UIL did not recognize a team championship in this event until the 1988-89 scholastic year.

School Year	Class A	Class AA	Class AAA	Class AAAA	Class AAAAA
1988-89	Plains	Shallowater	Quitman	Wichita Falls Hirschi	McAllen
1989-90	Plains	Shallowater	Orangefield	Wichita Falls Hirschi	Mission
1990-91	San Isidro	Quanah	Austin Lake Travis	Azle	Lubbock
1991-92	Sterling City	Shallowater	Devine	Wichita Falls	McAllen
1992-93	Sterling City	Little Elm	Crane	Wichita Falls	Lubbock
1993-94	Plains	Little Elm	Bridgeport	Buda Hays Consolidated	Alvin
1994-95	Henrietta Midway	Salado	Bridgeport	Azle	Sugar Land Elkins
1995-96	Rule	Salado	Shallowater	Longview Pine Tree	Mission
1996-97	Henrietta Midway	Shallowater	Bridgeport	Longview Pine Tree	Spring Westfield
1997-98	Henrietta Midway	Plains	Santa Rosa	Longview Pine Tree	Mission
1998-99	Henrietta Midway	Salado	Santa Rosa	Sulphur Springs	Klein
1999-2000	Valley View	Salado	Bridgeport	Azle	Klein
2000-01	Muenster	Salado	Bridgeport	Corpus Christi Flour Bluff	Edinburg North
2001-02	Muenster	Salado	Bridgeport	Corpus Christi Flour Bluff	Edinburg North
2002-03	Muenster	Salado	Bridgeport	Azle	Edinburg North
2003-04	Lindsay	Salado	Bridgeport	Medina Valley	Pearland
2004-05	Lindsay	Argyle	Bridgeport	Medina Valley	La Joya
2005-06	Garden City	Argyle	Bridgeport	Medina Valley	Klein
2006-07	Lindsay	Wichita Falls City View	Longview Spring Hill	Corpus Christi Flour Bluff	San Antonio O'Connor
2007-08	Lindsay	Caddo Mills	Argyle	Katy Seven Lakes	Klein, Melissa
