= Calculator Applications (UIL) =

Calculator Applications is one of several academic events sanctioned by the University Interscholastic League (UIL) in Texas, US. It is also a competition held by the Texas Math and Science Coaches Association, using the same rules as the UIL.

Calculator Applications is designed to test students' abilities to use general calculator functions.

Calculator Applications replaced the Slide Rule contest previously held by UIL.

== Eligibility ==
Students in Grade 6 through Grade 12 are eligible to enter this event. For competition purposes, separate divisions are held for Grades 6-8 and Grades 9-12, with separate subjects covered on each test as follows:

- The test for Grades 6-8 covers addition, subtraction, multiplication, division, roots, and powers, including straightforward calculation problems and simple geometric and stated problems similar to those found in state textbooks.
- The test for Grades 9-12 covers the subjects under Grades 6-8 plus exponentiation, logarithms, trigonometric functions, inverse trigonometric functions, iterative solutions for transcendental equations, differential and integral calculus, elementary statistics and matrix algebra.

For Grades 6-8, each school may send up to three students. To participate in team competition, schools must send three students.

For Grades 9-12 each school may send up to four students; however, in districts with more than eight schools the district executive committee can limit participation to three students per school. For a school to participate in team competition, the school must send at least three students.

== Rules and scoring ==
The test consists of 80 questions at the elementary and junior high levels (the number is not specified for the high school level but usually consists of 70 questions), which the student must complete in only 30 minutes. Judges give no intermediate time signal—at the end of 30 minutes, students must immediately stop calculator processing, but may write one final answer for the problem they're working on at the stop signal. Students must answer questions in order. A skipped question counts as a wrong answer.

Students can bring up to two calculators to use in the contest, provided they meet certain criteria. Calculators must:

- Be commercially available models (models once available, but later discontinued remain eligible)
- Be hand-held, operate silently, and operate without external power (rechargeable batteries are permitted but must be charged prior to competition)

For a question to score as correct, the student must answer it to the third significant digit—with allowable error in the third digit of plus or minus one, except for integer, dollar sign, and certain stated problems that require least significant digits.

- For integer problems to score as correct, the student must provide the exact answer (no allowable error) and must give the answer in integer format (decimal points and scientific notation are scored as incorrect).
- For dollar sign problems to score as correct, the student must answer the question to the nearest cent, with allowable error of plus or minus one cent, and must use decimal points and cents.
- For stated problems that use inexact numbers, correct answers require the method of least significant digits, with allowable error of plus or minus one in the last significant digit.

Five points are awarded for each correct answer, and two points are deducted for each wrong or skipped answer. However, questions not answered beyond the last attempted answer (defined as any problem where a mark or erasure exists in the answer blank for that problem) are not scored. In addition, at the high school level only, 3 points are given on stated problems involving inexact numbers that are answered correctly but with the incorrect number of significant digits, provided at least two significant digits are indicated and the more precise answer rounds exactly to the lesser precise answer.

== Determining the winner ==
=== Elementary and junior high ===
Scoring is posted for only the top six individual places and the top three teams.

There are no tiebreakers for either individual or team competition.

=== High school level ===
The top three individuals and the top team (determined based on the scores of the top three individuals) will advance to the next round. In addition, within each region, the highest-scoring second place team from all district competitions advances as the "wild card" to regional competition (provided the team has four members), and within the state, the highest-scoring second place team from all regional competitions advances as the wild card to the state competition. Members of advancing teams who did not place individually remain eligible to compete for individual awards at higher levels.

For individual competition, the tiebreaker is points on stated or geometric problems. Scoring for these problems, for tiebreaker purposes, is the same as for overall except no points are deducted for incorrect answers. In the event a tie remains, all remaining individuals will advance.

For team competition, the score of the fourth-place individual is used as the tiebreaker. If a team has only three members it is not eligible to participate in the tiebreaker. If the fourth-place score still results in a tie, the individual tiebreaker rules will not apply, and all remaining tied teams will advance. At the state level ties for first place are not broken.

For district meet academic championship and district meet sweepstakes awards, points are awarded to the school as follows:

- Individual places: 1st—15, 2nd—12, 3rd—10, 4th—8, 5th—6, and 6th—4.
- Team places: 1st—10 and 2nd—5.
- The maximum number of points a school can earn in Calculator Applications is 37.

== List of past winners ==
=== Individual ===
NOTE: For privacy reasons, only the winning school is shown.

School Year	Class A	Class AA	Class AAA	Class AAAA	Class AAAAA
1980-81	Lefors	Shamrock	Kermit	Andrews	Fuad
1981-82	Ladonia Fannindel	Shamrock	George West	Daingerfield	San Antonio Roosevelt
1982-83	Lefors	Longview Spring Hill	Daingerfield	Carrizo Springs	San Antonio Roosevelt
1983-84	Sudan	Van Horn	Daingerfield	Andrews	Alvin
1984-85	Windthorst	Springlake-Earth	Taft	La Joya	(not available)
1985-86	(tie) Windthorst/San Isidro	(tie) Plains/Seymour/Liberty Hill	Longview Spring Hill	La Joya	Klein Oak
1986-87	Plains	Liberty Hill	Commerce	La Joya	Klein Oak
1987-88	Plains	Stamford	Commerce	Wichita Falls Hirschi	Klein Oak
1988-89	Plains	Stamford	Commerce	Wichita Falls Hirschi	San Antonio Roosevelt
1989-90	(tie) Plains/Westbrook	Van Horn	Bishop	Wichita Falls Hirschi	Lubbock
1990-91	San Isidro	Van Horn	Bandera	Carrizo Springs	Lubbock
1991-92	San Isidro	Stamford	Bandera	Azle	Lubbock
1992-93	San Isidro	Quanah	Bandera	Corpus Christi Flour Bluff	Odessa Permian
1993-94	Sterling City	Stamford	Bishop	Longview Pine Tree	Arlington Sam Houston
1994-95	Rule	Hamilton	Bishop	Gregory-Portland	Wichita Falls Rider
1995-96	Rule	Stamford	Bridgeport	Gregory-Portland	Sugar Land Elkins
1996-97	Henrietta Midway	Plains	Bridgeport	Longview Pine Tree	Pharr-San Juan-Alamo
1997-98	Henrietta Midway	Stamford	Bridgeport	Azle	Pharr-San Juan-Alamo
1998-99	Valley View	Plains	Santa Rosa	Gregory-Portland	Klein
1999-2000	Valley View	Plains	Bridgeport	Fredericksburg	McAllen
2000-01	Nazareth	Elkhart	Bridgeport	Pharr-San Juan-Alamo	Sugar Land Elkins
2001-02	Nazareth	Elkhart	Bridgeport	Pharr-San Juan-Alamo Memorial	San Antonio Southwest
2002-03	Plains	Elkhart	Bridgeport	Pharr-San Juan-Alamo Memorial	McAllen
2003-04	San Isidro	Valley View	Bridgeport	Pharr-San Juan-Alamo	(tie) McAllen Memorial/Sugar Land Elkins
2004-05	San Isidro	Argyle	Bridgeport	Azle	La Joya
2005-06	Garden City	Argyle	Bridge City	El Paso	La Joya
2006-07	Garden City	Ballinger	Longview Spring Hill	Mount Pleasant	Lubbock
2007-08	Lindsay	Tuscola Jim Ned	Bridge City	Nederland	Pharr-San Juan-Alamo
2008-09	Lindsay	Caddo Mills	Argyle	Corpus Christi Flour Bluff	(tie) Klein/Fort Bend Clements
2009-10	Poolville	Elkhart	Argyle	Mission Veterans Memorial	Fort Bend Clements
2010-11	Plains	New Boston	Argyle	Mission Veterans Memorial	Fort Bend Clements

=== Team ===
NOTE: UIL did not recognize a team championship in this event until the 1988-89 scholastic year.

School Year	Class A	Class AA	Class AAA	Class AAAA	Class AAAAA
1988-89	Plains	Shallowater	Bishop	Port Neches-Groves	McAllen
1989-90	Plains	Shallowater	Bishop	Azle	Converse Judson
1990-91	Sterling City	Shallowater	Bandera	Carrizo Springs	Lubbock
1991-92	San Isidro	Stamford	Ingleside	Carrizo Springs	Lubbock
1992-93	Westbrook	Quanah	Carrizo Springs	Longview Pine Tree	McAllen
1993-94	Rule	Stamford	Carrizo Springs	Longview Pine Tree	Lubbock
1994-95	Rule	Stamford	Bridgeport	Gregory-Portland	Sugar Land Elkins
1995-96	Rule	Stamford	Bridgeport	Longview Pine Tree	Sugar Land Elkins
1996-97	Henrietta Midway	Plains	Bridgeport	Longview Pine Tree	Pharr-San Juan-Alamo
1997-98	Rule	Plains	Santa Rosa	Azle	Klein
1998-99	Valley View	Hamilton	Santa Rosa	Pharr-San Juan-Alamo	Klein
1999-2000	Valley View	Hamilton	Bridgeport	Fredericksburg	McAllen
2000-01	Nazareth	Elkhart	Bridgeport	Pharr-San Juan-Alamo	Klein
2001-02	Nazareth	Elkhart	Bridgeport	Longview Pine Tree	San Antonio Southwest
2002-03	Plains	Elkhart	Bridgeport	Longview Pine Tree	San Antonio Southwest
2003-04	Henrietta Midway	Argyle	Bridgeport	Pharr-San Juan-Alamo	San Antonio Southwest
2004-05	Plains	Argyle	Bridgeport	Longview Pine Tree	Lubbock
2005-06	Garden City	Argyle	Bridge City	Longview Pine Tree	Pharr-San Juan-Alamo
2006-07	Garden City	Salado	Bridge City	Mission Veterans Memorial	Lubbock
2007-08	San Isidro	Elkhart	Bridge City	Nederland	Klein
2008-09	Lindsay	Elkhart	Argyle	Longview Pine Tree	Fort Bend Clements
2009-10	Poolville	Paris Chisum	Argyle	Mission Veterans Memorial	Galena Park North Shore
2010-11	Lindsay	Elkhart	Argyle	Mission Veterans Memorial	Galena Park North Shore
