= Jay Mathews =

American author and education reporter

Jay Mathews is an author and education columnist with the Washington Post.

== Career ==
Mathews has worked at the Washington Post writing news reports and books about China, disability rights, the stock market, and education. He writes the Class Struggle blog for the Washington Post.

He has prepared the annual ranking of "America’s Most Challenging High Schools" for the Washington Post (and previously for Newsweek) for 18 years. He developed the "challenge index" by counting how many individuals take Advanced Placement, International Baccalaureate, and Advanced International Certificate of Education tests at a school each year, divided by the number of graduating seniors. Top-performing schools are excluded.

He previously held Bureau Chief posts at locations including Beijing, as its first Bureau Chief in 1979-1980, and Los Angeles. He spent several weeks back in Beijing in 1989 to cover the Tiananmen protests at the time, and has since challenged the dominant media narrative of a student massacre inside Tiananmen Square, reporting that all remaining students at the square, were allowed to leave the square peacefully when soldiers arrived, and that instead hundreds of people, mostly workers and passersby did perish that night, "but in a different place and under different circumstances".

== Bibliography ==
Year	Title	Pages	Publisher	ISBN
1985	One Billion	448	Ballentine	ISBN 0345298950
1985	China and the U.S.		Foreign Policy Association	ISBN 0871240947
1986	Sino-American Relations After Normalization: Toward the Second Decade	63	Foreign Policy Association	ISBN 0871241056
1988	Escalante: The Best Teacher in America	322	Henry Holt & Co.	ISBN 0805011951
1992	A Mother's Touch: The Tiffany Callo Story	265	Henry Holt & Co.	ISBN 0805017143
1998	The Myth of Tiananmen and the Price of a Passive Press	12	Columbia Journalism Review	
1998	Class Struggle : What's Wrong (and Right) with America's Best Public High Schools	320	Times Books	ISBN 0812931408
2003	Harvard Schmarvard: Getting Beyond the Ivy League to the College That is Best for You	304	Three Rivers Press	ISBN 0761536957
2005	Supertest: How the International Baccalaureate Can Strengthen Our Schools	237	Open Court	ISBN 0812695771
2009	Work Hard. Be Nice.	328	Algonquin Books	ISBN 9781565125162
2012	"The War Against Dummy Math"	140	American Institutes for Research	ISBN 1456340115
2015	"Question Everything"	266	Jossey-Bass	ISBN 9781118438190
