= Texas Math and Science Coaches Association =

- Formation: 1981
- Executive Director: Julie Majewski-Smith
- Website: https://www.tmsca.org/

The Texas Math and Science Coaches Association, or TMSCA, is an organization for coaches of academic University Interscholastic League teams in Texas elementary schools, middle schools and high schools, specifically those that compete in mathematics and science-related tests.

== Events ==
There are four events in the TMSCA at the elementary, middle, and high school levels: Number Sense, General Mathematics, Calculator Applications, and General Science.

Number Sense is an 80-question exam that students are given only 10 minutes to solve. Calculations can be done with a certain trick or shortcut that makes them feasible mentally. Additionally, no scratch work or paper calculations are allowed and almost everything has to be done mentally. All correct problems are awarded and for every problem wrong or skipped before the last problem attempted 4 points are deducted. These questions range from simple calculations such as 99+98 to more complicated operations such as 1001×1938. The high school exam includes calculus and other difficult topics in the questions also with the same rules applied as to the middle school version. It is well known that the grading for this event is particularly stringent as errors such as writing over a line or crossing out potential answers are considered incorrect answers.

General Mathematics is a 50-question exam that students are given only 40 minutes to solve. These problems are usually more challenging than questions on the Number Sense test, and the General Mathematics word problems take more thinking to figure out. Every problem correct is worth 5 points, and for every problem incorrect, 2 points are deducted. There is no penalty or points awarded for skipped problems. Tiebreakers are determined by the person who misses the first problem and by percent accuracy. The material on the test ranges from Algebra I and II, trigonometry, analytic geometry, and pre-calculus with problems adjusted for the middle school level.

Calculator Applications or Calculator is an 80-question exam that students are given only 30 minutes to solve. This test requires the use of a calculator, knowledge of a few crucial formulas, and much speed and intensity. Memorizing formulas, tips, and tricks will not be enough. The problems cover basic arithmetic operations, roots, exponents, logarithms, trigonometric functions and inverse trigonometric functions. The problems are adjusted for the middle school level.In this event, plenty of practice is necessary in order to master the locations of the keys and develop the speed necessary. All correct questions are worth 5 points and all incorrect questions or skipped questions that are before the last answered questions will lose 4 points; answers are to be given with three significant figures.

Science is a 50-question exam that is solved in 40 minutes at the middle school level or a 60-question exam that is solved in a 2-hour time limit at the high school level. Tiebreakers are determined by the person who misses the first problem and by percent accuracy. The test covers an extremely wide range of science topics from biology to chemistry to physics. Questions can be on the basic principles of a science, the history of it, major scientists from that field, and data analysis.

== Competitions ==
Individual schools that are members of TMSCA can host invitational competitions using TMSCA-released tests. Many schools use this as a fund-raising opportunity for their competitive math program.

TMSCA also hosts two statewide competitions for member schools each year, one at the middle school level and one at the high school level, as well as a qualification competition at the middle school level before the state competition, also known as the Regional Qualifier. At the Regional Qualifier students have to exceed a certain cutoff score that varies per event to qualify. These cutoff scores also vary by grade (6th, 7th, 8th) and school size (1A-4A, 5A-6A). The higher the grade the higher the cutoff and the larger the school the higher the cutoff. The statewide competitions are held at the University of Texas at San Antonio campus during spring. The statewide competitions are always more difficult than the lower levels. These competitions can often serve as practice for statewide UIL tournaments, which occur shortly after, and for middle school students are their only opportunity to compete at the state level (UIL competitions at the middle school level do not go beyond district). At the statewide competition, students have the opportunity to win scholarships based on their performance at the meet.

== Grading ==
For the General Mathematics and General Science contests in middle school, 5 points are awarded for each correct answer and 2 points are deducted for each incorrect answer. In the high school contest, 6 points are awarded for each correct answer and 2 points are deducted for each incorrect answer. The official way to calculate the score is to multiply the number of questions you attempted by 5 and subtract 7 for each incorrect question. Unanswered questions do not affect the score. Thus, competitors are penalized for guessing incorrectly. For both General Mathematics and General Science a perfect score is 250.

On the Number Sense test, scoring is 5 times the last question answered (a student answering 32 questions would be awarded 160 points) after which 9 points are deducted for incorrect answers, problems skipped up to the last attempted question, and markovers/erasures, (so if the student above missed one and skipped three questions the student would end up with 124 points). Number sense tests are also checked for possible scratch work, overwrites, and erasures which if found could result in questions being counted as incorrect or tests being disqualified. The perfect score for both Number Sense and Calculator is 400.

The Calculator Applications test multiplies 5 times the last question answered and deducts 9 points for incorrect or skipped questions, similar to Number Sense, but scratch work, markovers/erasures, and the use of a calculator are allowed.

== Results ==
At almost all TMSCA competitions, students are ranked against each other in their specific grade level. For example, all eighth graders compete against each other, all seventh graders compete against each other, and so on. This ensures parity of competition since students in higher grades generally tend to score higher than students in lower grades. Particularly at the high school level, there is a stark contrast between freshmen with little real math and science experience and seniors, who presumably have taken or are taking advanced placement science courses and calculus.
