= Alvin, Texas =

Alvin
- City
- Motto: "In touch with the past...planning for the future"
- Interactive map of Alvin
- Location in Texas Alvin (the United States) Alvin (North America)
- Coordinates: 29°23′37″N 95°16′18″W
- Country: United States
- State: Texas
- County: Brazoria
- Incorporated: 1893

Government
  - Type: Council-manager
  - Mayor: Gabe Adame
  - City Manager: Junru Roland

Area
  - Total: 25.14 sq mi (65.11 km^{2})
  - Land: 24.27 sq mi (62.85 km^{2})
  - Water: 0.87 sq mi (2.26 km^{2})
- Elevation: 46 ft (14 m)

Population (2020)
  - Total: 27,098
  - Estimate (2025): 30,115
  - Density: 1,101.2/sq mi (425.18/km^{2})
- Time zone: UTC-6 (CST)
  - Summer (DST): UTC-5 (CDT)
- ZIP codes: 77511-77512
- Area code: 281
- FIPS code: 48-02272
- GNIS feature ID: 2409692
- Website: www.alvin.gov

Alvin is a city in the U.S. state of Texas within the Houston–Pasadena–The Woodlands metropolitan area and Brazoria County. As of the 2020 census, Alvin had a population of 27,098. Alvin's claim to fame is Baseball Hall of Famer Nolan Ryan, who moved with his family to the city in 1947 as an infant and lived there until he moved to Round Rock in 2003. The Nolan Ryan Museum is in the Nolan Ryan Foundation and Exhibit Center on the campus of Alvin Community College. Alvin is also the home town of professional pitcher Nathan Eovaldi and professional football quarterback Joe Ferguson.

== History ==
The Alvin area was settled in the mid-19th century when bull ranches were established in the area. The Santa Fe Railroad eventually expanded into the area, and a settlement was established along the railroad. Alvin was originally named "Morgan" by the town's residents in honor of the settlement's original resident, Santa Fe employee Alvin Morgan; upon discovery that the name Morgan had been taken, the town named itself after Morgan's first name. The town was officially incorporated in 1893, making it the oldest incorporated settlement in Brazoria County. Alvin Morgan received a land grant from the state of Texas prior to 1891.

Alvin was a sundown town in the 1930s, where practically no African Americans were allowed to live.

In 1960, the city annexed a 100-foot-wide (30 m) 137-mile-long (220 km) stretch of land to protect Alvin from being annexed by other cities. The city's unusual borders were the subject of a lawsuit against Missouri City when it attempted an annexation into Brazoria County and across Alvin's city limits in 2002.

On July 25, 1979, Tropical Storm Claudette stalled over Alvin and inundated the region with 45 inches (1,140 mm) of rain in 42 hours. The total included 43 inches (1,090 mm) in 24 hours, at the time the highest amount of rainfall in 24 hours in American history.

== Geography ==
Alvin is bordered to the northeast by Friendswood and League City in Galveston County, and part of its southeast border is along the village of Hillcrest. Texas State Highway 35 bypasses the center of the city to the east; it leads north 25 miles (40 km) to downtown Houston and southwest 21 miles (34 km) to Angleton, the Brazoria County seat. Texas State Highway 6 crosses Highway 35 and passes through the center of Alvin, leading southeast 30 miles (48 km) to Galveston and 28 miles (45 km) northwest to Sugar Land.

According to the United States Census Bureau, Alvin has a total area of 25.6 square miles (66.4 km^{2}), of which 24.3 square miles (62.9 km^{2}) is land and 1.4 square miles (3.5 km^{2}), or 5.26%, is water.

Historical population
Census	Pop.	Note	%±
1890	261		—
1900	996		281.6%
1910	1,453		45.9%
1920	1,519		4.5%
1930	1,511		−0.5%
1940	3,087		104.3%
1950	3,701		19.9%
1960	5,643		52.5%
1970	10,671		89.1%
1980	16,515		54.8%
1990	19,220		16.4%
2000	21,413		11.4%
2010	24,236		13.2%
2020	27,098		11.8%
2025 (est.)	30,115		11.1%
1930–2000 2010

=== Climate ===
Climate data for Alvin, Texas (1991–2020)
Month	Jan	Feb	Mar	Apr	May	Jun	Jul	Aug	Sep	Oct	Nov	Dec	Year
Mean daily maximum °F (°C)	63.3 (17.4)	66.7 (19.3)	72.5 (22.5)	77.6 (25.3)	84.7 (29.3)	89.0 (31.7)	90.9 (32.7)	91.1 (32.8)	88.5 (31.4)	81.4 (27.4)	72.5 (22.5)	64.7 (18.2)	78.6 (25.9)
Daily mean °F (°C)	53.4 (11.9)	57.2 (14.0)	63.3 (17.4)	68.7 (20.4)	76.1 (24.5)	80.7 (27.1)	82.5 (28.1)	82.5 (28.1)	79.5 (26.4)	71.0 (21.7)	62.0 (16.7)	55.0 (12.8)	69.3 (20.8)
Mean daily minimum °F (°C)	43.5 (6.4)	47.7 (8.7)	54.0 (12.2)	59.8 (15.4)	67.5 (19.7)	72.3 (22.4)	74.0 (23.3)	74.0 (23.3)	70.4 (21.3)	60.6 (15.9)	51.5 (10.8)	45.2 (7.3)	60.0 (15.6)
Average precipitation inches (mm)	4.87 (124)	2.98 (76)	3.08 (78)	4.23 (107)	4.64 (118)	5.98 (152)	4.20 (107)	5.60 (142)	5.37 (136)	5.34 (136)	4.31 (109)	4.47 (114)	55.07 (1,399)
Average snowfall inches (cm)	0.0 (0.0)	0.0 (0.0)	0.0 (0.0)	0.0 (0.0)	0.0 (0.0)	0.0 (0.0)	0.0 (0.0)	0.0 (0.0)	0.0 (0.0)	0.0 (0.0)	0.0 (0.0)	0.0 (0.0)	0 (0)
Source: NOAA

== Demographics ==
=== 2020 census ===
As of the 2020 census, there were 27,098 people, 10,069 households, and 6,895 families residing in the city.

The median age was 34.9 years. 25.6% of residents were under the age of 18 and 14.0% of residents were 65 years of age or older. For every 100 females there were 94.5 males, and for every 100 females age 18 and over there were 91.2 males age 18 and over.

98.4% of residents lived in urban areas, while 1.6% lived in rural areas.

Of those households, 35.1% had children under the age of 18 living in them. Of all households, 44.5% were married-couple households, 19.5% were households with a male householder and no spouse or partner present, and 28.8% were households with a female householder and no spouse or partner present. About 26.8% of all households were made up of individuals and 10.4% had someone living alone who was 65 years of age or older.

There were 11,058 housing units, of which 8.9% were vacant. Among occupied housing units, 56.4% were owner-occupied and 43.6% were renter-occupied. The homeowner vacancy rate was 2.3% and the rental vacancy rate was 10.1%.

Racial composition as of the 2020 census
Race	Percent
White	64.1%
Black or African American	4.3%
American Indian and Alaska Native	0.8%
Asian	1.4%
Native Hawaiian and Other Pacific Islander	<0.1%
Some other race	13.5%
Two or more races	15.9%
Hispanic or Latino (of any race)	37.7%

=== 2010 census ===
As of the 2010 Census, the population was 24,236 people, with a population density of 1,475 people per square mile.

=== 2000 census ===
As of the census of 2000, there were 21,413 people, 7,826 households, and 5,603 families residing in the city. The population density was 1,302.9 inhabitants per square mile (503.1/km^{2}). There were 8,442 housing units at an average density of 513.7 per square mile (198.3/km^{2}). The racial makeup of the city was 82.28% White, 2.11% African American, 0.49% Native American, 0.79% Asian, 0.06% Pacific Islander, 10.88% from other races, and 3.40% from two or more races. Hispanic or Latino of any race were 28.09% of the population.

There were 7,826 households, out of which 39.3% had children under the age of 18 living with them, 51.9% were married couples living together, 13.6% had a female householder with no husband present, and 28.4% were non-families. 23.4% of all households were made up of individuals, and 7.7% had someone living alone who was 65 years of age or older. The average household size was 2.71 and the average family size was 3.22.

In the city, the population was spread out, with 29.7% under the age of 18, 11.1% from 18 to 24, 30.6% from 25 to 44, 19.3% from 45 to 64, and 9.4% who were 65 years of age or older. The median age was 31 years. For every 100 females, there were 106.5 males. For every 100 females age 18 and over, there were 103.2 males.

The median income for a household in the city was $38,576, and the median income for a family was $43,987. Males had a median income of $36,216 versus $22,580 for females. The per capita income for the city was $17,016. About 10.8% of families and 13.3% of the population were below the poverty line, including 15.4% of those under age 18 and 10.1% of those age 65 or over.

== Education ==
=== Primary and secondary schools ===
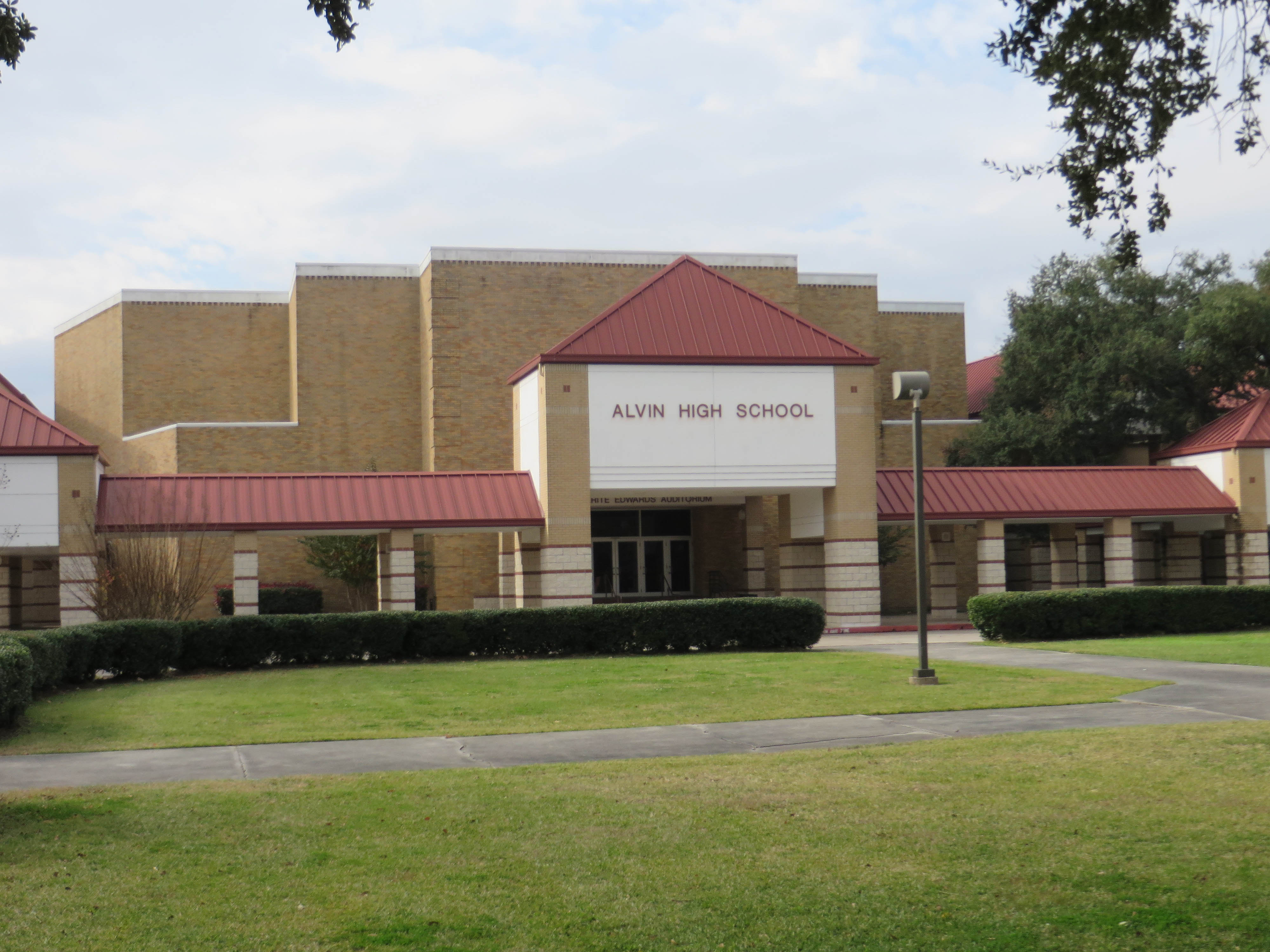
Alvin High School

==== Public schools ====
Most areas in the city of Alvin are within the Alvin Independent School District.

Schools within AISD include: High schools:

- Alvin High School
- Manvel High School
- Shadow Creek High School
- Iowa Colony High School

Junior high schools:

- Alvin Junior High
- Fairview Junior High
- G.W. Harby Junior High
- Rodeo Palms Junior High
- Manvel Junior High
- Dr.Ronald E. McNair Junior High
- Nolan Ryan Junior High
- Jackie Doucet Caffey Junior High

Elementary Schools:

- Golda Hood-Bobbie Case Elementary
- Melba L. Passmore Elementary
- Mark Twain Elementary
- Dr. James "Red" Duke Elementary
- Glenn York Elementary
- Alvin Elementary
- Walt Disney Elementary
- Bel Nafegar Elementary
- Bob and Betty Nelson Elementary
- Don Jeter Elementary
- E.C. Mason Elementary
- Laura Ingalls Wilder Elementary
- Mary Burks Marek Elementary
- Meridiana Elementary
- Pomona Elementary
- Savannah Lakes Elementary
- Shirley Dill Brothers Elementary
- Bill Hasse Elementary

Some areas of the Alvin city limits extend to the Angleton Independent School District.

=== Colleges and universities ===
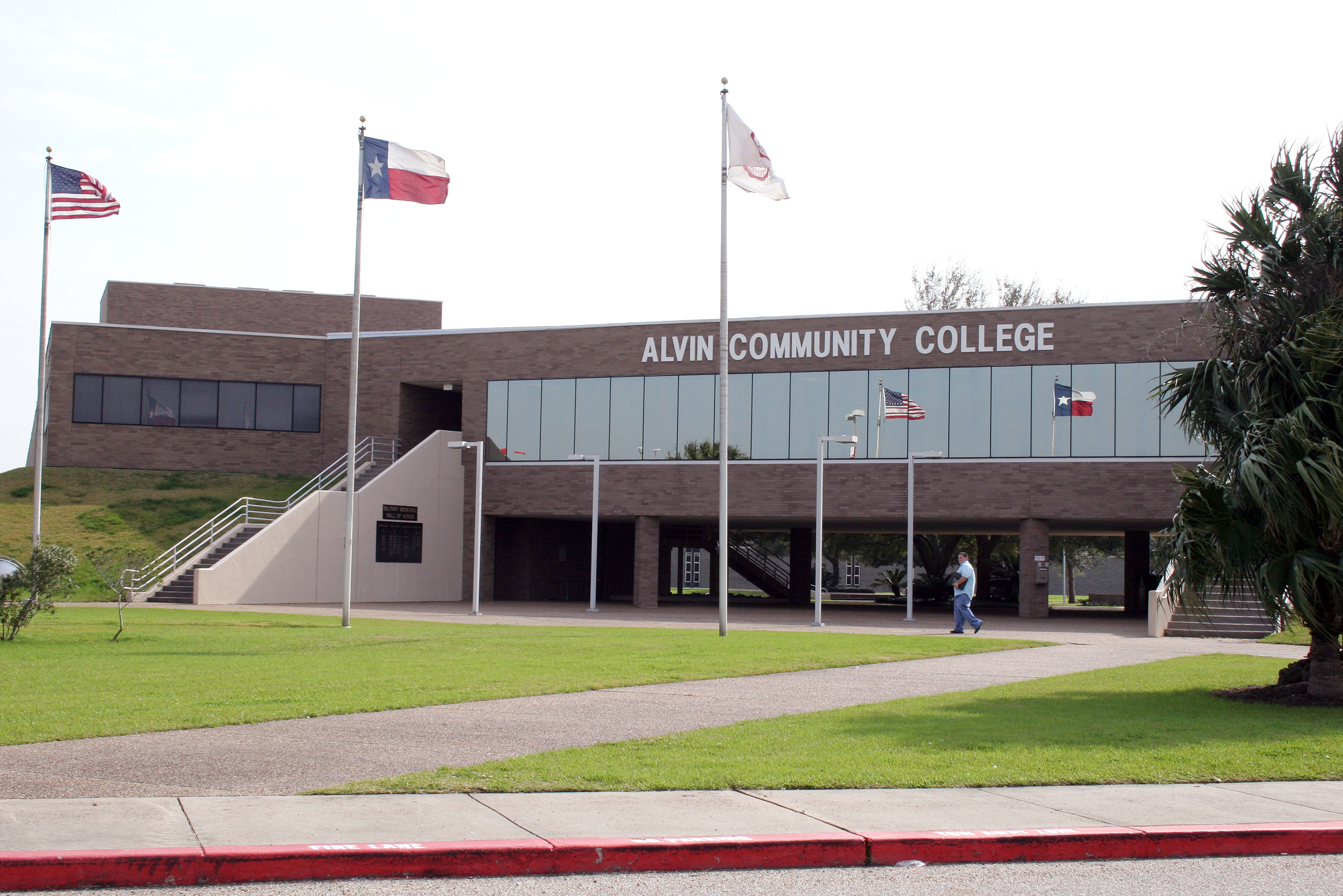
Alvin Community College

Alvin Community College provides basic undergraduate courses and adult education. Alvin is in the ACC taxation zone.

=== Public libraries ===
The Alvin Library is a part of the Brazoria County Library System. The library closed in 2010 to repair damages done by Hurricane Ike, and during that renovation, a fire broke out causing major smoke damage. The library reopened in June 2011.

== Transportation ==
Greyhound Bus Lines operates the Alvin Station at Yellow Jacket Grocery-Citgo.

== Postal services ==
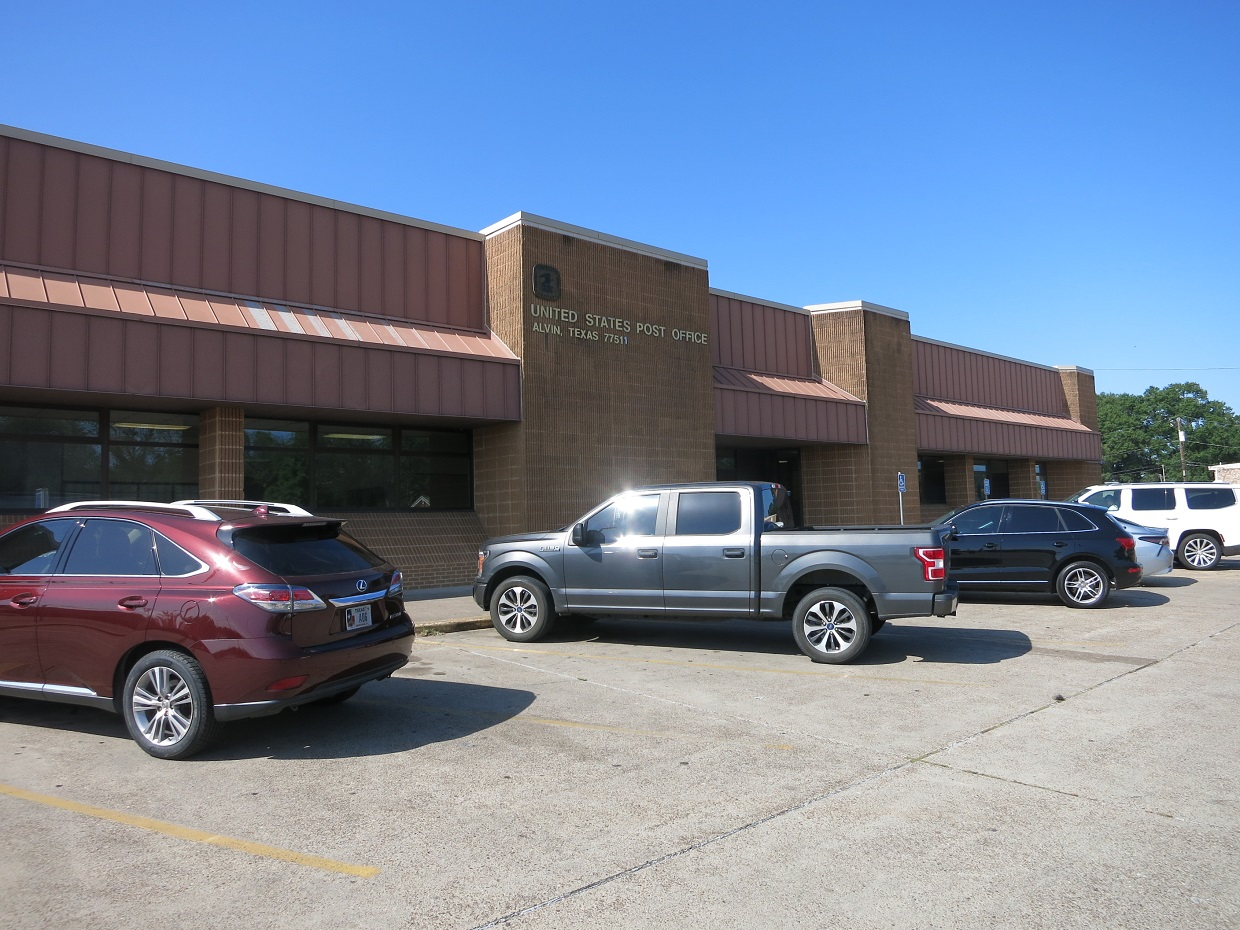
US Post Office, Alvin, TX

The United States Postal Service operates the Alvin Post Office at 455 East House Street, 77511-9998.

== Community information ==
The Alvin Rotary Club sponsors a yearly Frontier Day celebration, which includes a parade and 5k Fun Run.

== Popular culture connections ==
Alvin was featured in the CMT series Trick my What?, featuring the Froberg family, who have been members of the Alvin community for more than 70 years.

== Notable people ==
- Bill Crider, author
- Douglas Duncan, professional bullrider
- Nathan Eovaldi, Major League Baseball starting pitcher for the Texas Rangers and World Series winner, born 1990
- Joe Ferguson, former NFL player for the Buffalo Bills, was born in Alvin in 1950
- Gary Keithley, former NFL player for the Arizona Cardinals
- Austin Miller, Broadway and television actor, reared in Alvin, grandson of George Stanton, resident of New York City
- Gunner Olszewski, current wide receiver for the Pittsburgh Steelers
- Nolan Ryan, Hall of Fame Major League Baseball pitcher, reared in Alvin, resident of Round Rock
- Larry Wade Carrell, actor
- Randy Weber, member of the United States Congress. In 2012 Weber bought a home in Alvin
- Darryl Wills, racing driver

== Climate ==
The climate in this area is characterized by hot, humid summers and generally mild to cool winters. According to the Köppen Climate Classification system, Alvin has a humid subtropical climate, abbreviated "Cfa" on climate maps.

== See also ==
- List of sundown towns in the United States
