= Deneric Prince =

American football player (born 2000)

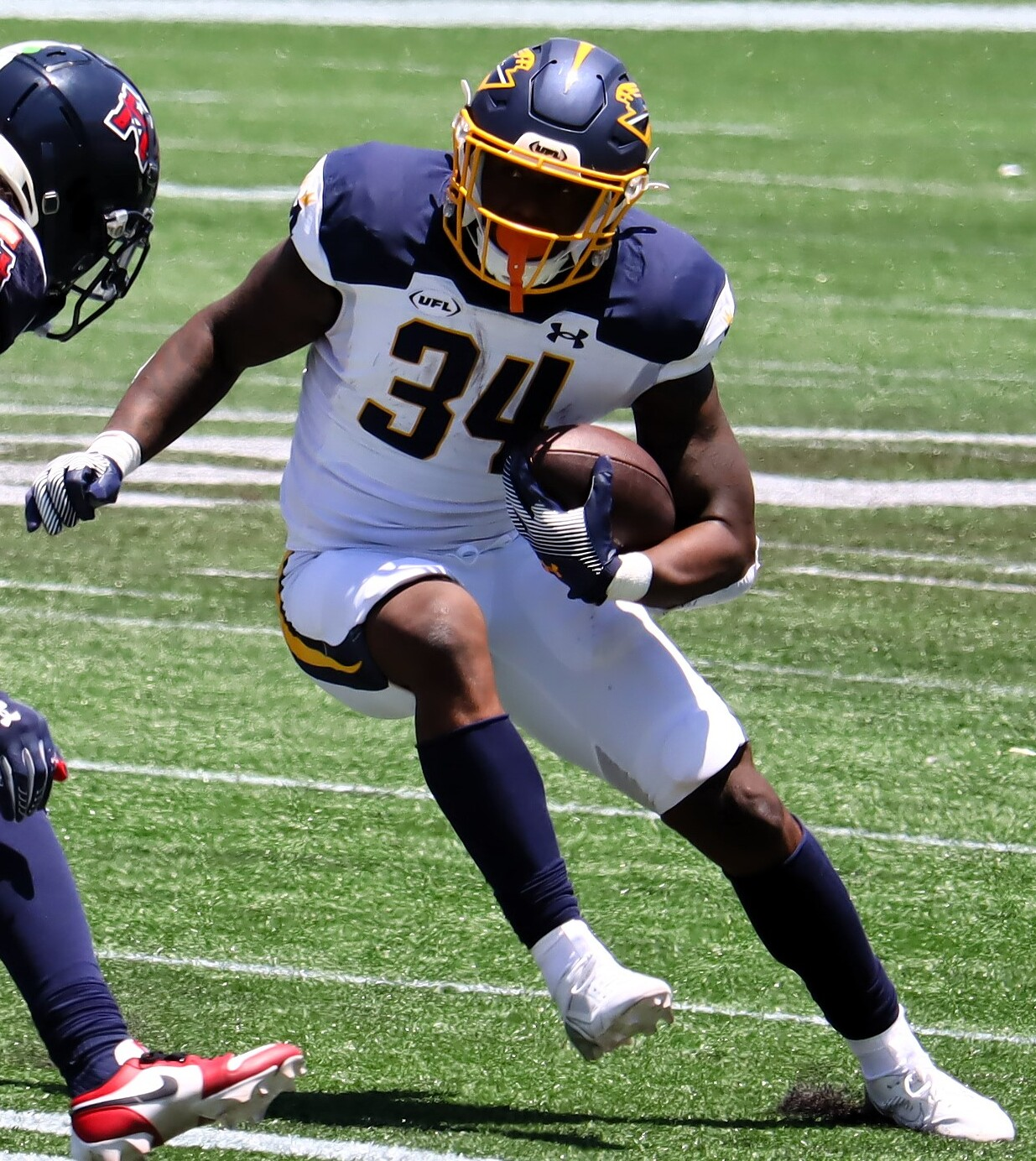
- Prince with the Memphis Showboats in 2025

Profile
- Position: Running back

Personal information
- Born: April 11, 2000 (age 26); Manvel, Texas, U.S.
- Listed height: 6 ft 0 in (1.83 m)
- Listed weight: 216 lb (98 kg)

Career information
- High school: Manvel (TX)
- College: Texas A&M (2018–2019); Tulsa (2020–2022)
- NFL draft: 2023: undrafted

Career history
- Kansas City Chiefs (2023); Miami Dolphins (2024)*; Memphis Showboats (2025); New England Patriots (2025)
- * Offseason or practice squad member only

Awards and highlights
- Super Bowl champion (LVIII)

Career NFL statistics
- Games played: 2
- Stats at Pro Football Reference

Deneric Prince (born April 11, 2000) is an American professional football running back. He played college football for the Texas A&M Aggies and Tulsa Golden Hurricane.

== Early life ==
Prince was born on April 11, 2000, in Manvel, Texas. He attended Manvel High School and was an all-district selection, rushing for 863 yards and 10 touchdowns as a senior while helping his team go 14–1. A consensus three-star recruit, Prince committed to Texas A&M over offers from UCLA and Louisville, among others.

== College career ==
As a freshman at Texas A&M, Prince only appeared in one game and ran twice for 21 yards; he saw no action at all the following season. He transferred to Tulsa in 2020. In his first year with the team, Prince appeared in eight games and posted 475 rushing yards with four touchdowns, averaging 5.4 yards-per-carry. He ran for 524 yards in 2021 and scored five times while appearing in 10 games, three of which he started. After missing the initial four games of his senior season in 2022, Prince appeared in the final eight and ran for 729 yards and five scores, additionally posting nine receptions for 84 yards and one touchdown. He finished his stint at Tulsa having started 12 of the 26 games in which he appeared, and totaled 314 rush attempts for 1,728 yards and 14 scores, with an additional 17 catches for 162 yards and one touchdown.

=== College statistics ===
Year	Team	Games		Rushing					Receiving				
Year	Team	GP	GS	Att	Yds	Avg	Lng	TD	Rec	Yds	Avg	Lng	TD
2018	Texas A&M	1	0	2	21	10.5	18	0	0	0	0.0	0	0
2019	Texas A&M	0	0	DNP									
2020	Tulsa	8	2	88	470	5.3	62	4	1	11	11.0	11	0
2021	Tulsa	10	3	100	524	5.2	59	5	7	67	9.6	20	0
2022	Tulsa	8	7	126	729	5.8	84	5	9	84	9.3	19	1
Career		27	12	316	1,744	5.5	84	14	17	162	9.5	20	1

== Professional career ==
Pre-draft measurables
Height	Weight	Arm length	Hand span	Wingspan	40-yard dash	10-yard split	20-yard split	20-yard shuttle	Three-cone drill	Vertical jump	Broad jump	Bench press
5 ft 11 3/4 in (1.82 m)	216 lb (98 kg)	31 1/4 in (0.79 m)	9 1/4 in (0.23 m)	6 ft 3 in (1.91 m)	4.41 s	1.53 s	2.56 s	4.33 s	6.97 s	35.5 in (0.90 m)	10 ft 4 in (3.15 m)	18 reps
All values from NFL Combine/Pro Day

=== Kansas City Chiefs ===
Although some sources projected Prince to be chosen as a late-round pick in the 2023 NFL draft, he went unselected. Afterwards, he was signed by the Kansas City Chiefs as an undrafted free agent. He was waived on August 29, 2023, and re-signed to the practice squad. Prince won his first Super Bowl championship when the Chiefs defeated the San Francisco 49ers in Super Bowl LVIII.

On February 14, 2024, Prince signed a reserve/future contract with the Chiefs. On August 27, Prince was released by the Chiefs.

=== Miami Dolphins ===
On August 30, 2024, Prince was signed to the Miami Dolphins' practice squad.

=== Memphis Showboats ===
On February 5, 2025, Prince signed with the Memphis Showboats of the United Football League (UFL). His contract was terminated on August 9, to sign with an NFL team.

=== New England Patriots ===
On August 10, 2025, Prince signed with the New England Patriots; however he was waived on August 12. The following day, he reverted to injured reserve.
