= Alvin High School =

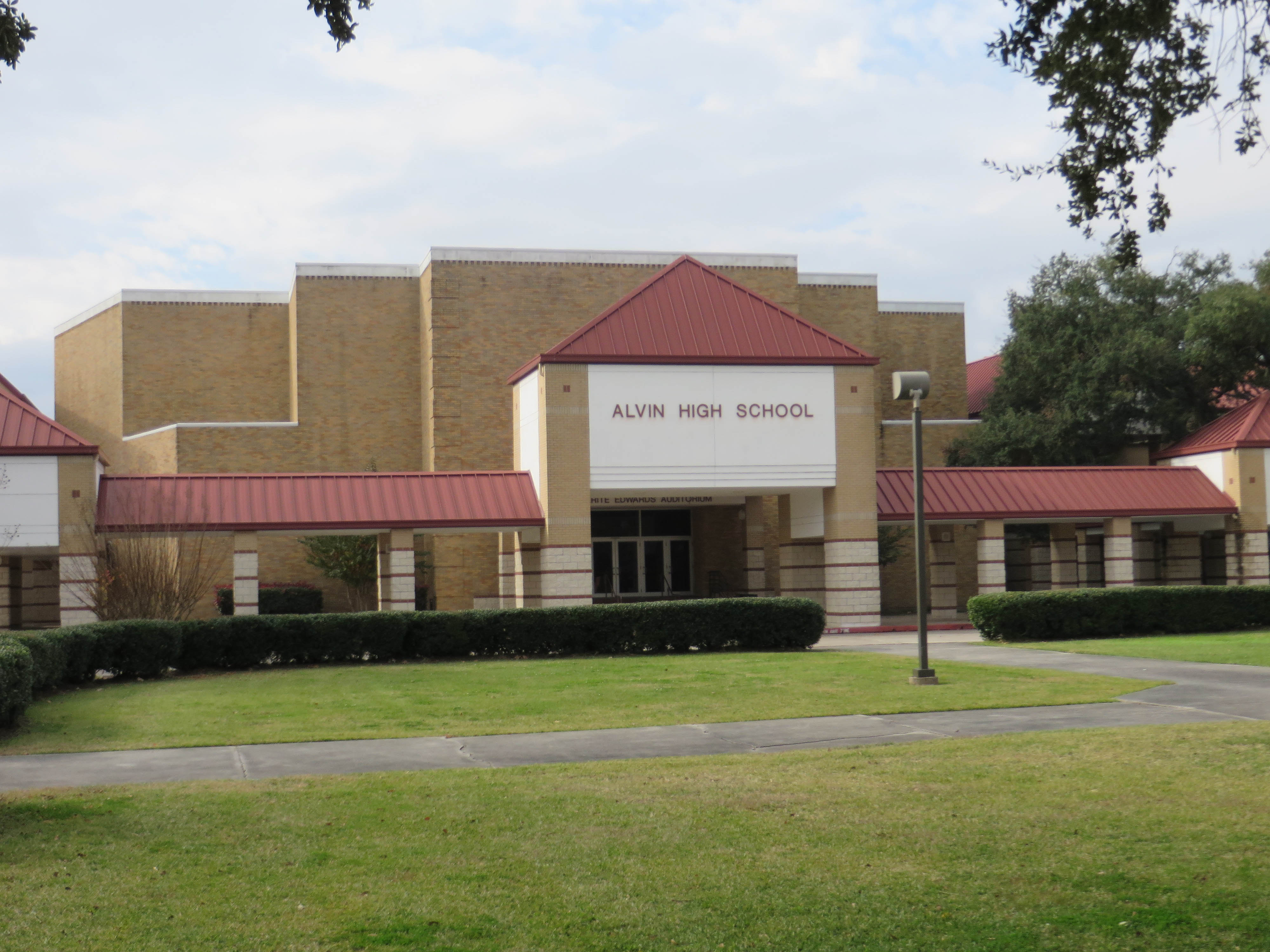

Location
- 802 South Johnson Street; Alvin, Texas 77511-3581; United States; 29.4177363°N 95.2510455°W

Information
- School type: Public, high school
- Established: 1894
- School district: Alvin ISD
- NCES School ID: 482499002789
- Principal: Robert Ford
- Teaching staff: 157.41 (on an FTE basis)
- Grades: 9‍–‍12
- Enrollment: 2,763 (2023‍–‍2024)
- Student to teacher ratio: 17.55
- Colors: Burnt orange and white
- Athletics conference: UIL Class AAAAAA
- Mascot: Yellowjackets
- Newspaper: The Clarion
- Yearbook: The Yellowjacket
- Website: www.alvinisd.net/ahs

Alvin High School is a public high school located in the city of Alvin, Texas and classified as a 6A school by the University Interscholastic League (UIL). It is a part of the Alvin Independent School District located in central Brazoria County. During 2023‍–‍2024, Alvin High School had an enrollment of 2,763 students and a student to teacher ratio of 17.55. The school received an overall rating of "B" from the Texas Education Agency for the 2024‍–‍2025 school year.

== History ==
Alvin High School opened in 1894, with its first graduating class graduating in 1897. Alvin High School gained more residents as many school districts consolidated into Alvin ISD. and remained Alvin ISD's only high school until Manvel High School opened in fall 2006 with 9th and 10th grades, phasing in 11th and 12th grades in the following two years.

In the fall of 2002; the size of the school was the impetus for creating a second high school, which would be Manvel High.

After the annexation of several school districts, ending with the Manvel Independent School District in 1973, Alvin High School as the sole high school in Alvin ISD. It served the city of Manvel, the town of Iowa Colony, portions of the city of Pearland (including the Brazoria County portion of Shadow Creek Ranch), and additional portions of unincorporated Brazoria County (including areas around Rosharon) until the opening of Manvel High School in 2006.

== Communities served by Alvin High School ==
Alvin High School serves the cities of Alvin, Hillcrest, and Liverpool, as well as unincorporated portions of Brazoria County (including Amsterdam).

== Extracurricular activities ==
=== Athletics ===
The Alvin Yellowjackets compete in these sports -

- Baseball
- Basketball
- Cross Country
- Football
- Golf
- Gymnastics
- Powerlifting
- Soccer
- Softball
- Swimming and Diving
- Tennis
- Track and Field
- Volleyball
- Water Polo

=== Academics and arts ===
- Academic Decathlon
- Choir
- Concert Band and Marching Band
- Theatre
- UIL Academics
  - Debate
  - Literary Criticism
  - Mathematics
  - One-Act Plays

=== State titles ===
- Softball
  - 2008(5A)
- Boys Track
  - 1925(B)
- United States Academic Decathlon
  - 2013
  - 2016
  - 2017

==== State finals appearances ====
- Baseball
  - 1965(3A)

== Notable alumni ==
- Nathan Eovaldi (class of 2008), MLB pitcher (2011–present), 2018 & 2023 World Series Champion
- Jill Alexander Essbaum (class of 1990), Award-winning Poet and New York Times Best Selling Author
- Savion Flagg (class of 2017), professional basketball player
- George Layne (class of 1998), NFL running back (2001–2004)
- Austin Miller (class of 1994), actor, singer and dancer
- Gunner Olszewski (class of 2015), NFL wide receiver (2019–present)
- Nolan Ryan (class of 1965), MLB pitcher (1966–1993) and Baseball Hall of Fame member, held Alvin High School strikeout record for 44 years
- Reid Ryan (class of 1990), former minor league baseball pitcher, former President of Business Operations for the Houston Astros organization
