= Meridiana, Texas =

Subdivision in Brazoria County, Texas

Meridiana is a master-planned community in Brazoria County, Texas. It is partially located in Iowa Colony, and some future sections will be located in Manvel.

Rise Communities LLC is the developer of the community. The community is scheduled to have 5,500 houses on 2,700 acres (1,100 ha) of land.

== History ==
Its groundbreaking was scheduled for April 10, 2015. Its grand opening was scheduled for March 25 and 26, 2017.

== Composition ==
It is in proximity to the intersection of Texas State Highway 288 and Texas State Highway 6, with the community located south of Highway 6. It is south of Pearland, and the distance from Downtown Houston is about 24 miles (39 km).

Sections of Meridiana Phase 1 are in Iowa Colony, and future phases are also scheduled to be within the city of Manvel.

The 60 feet (18 m) Meridiana Tower is the tallest structure in the community.

== Education ==
The Alvin Independent School District operates public schools serving Meridiana. Schools with Meridiana in their attendance boundaries include Meridiana Elementary School in Iowa Colony, Jackie Doucet Caffey Junior High School in Manvel, and Iowa Colony High School in Iowa Colony. Previously the secondary schools serving Meridiana were E.C Mason Elementary School, Manvel Junior High School, and Manvel High School, all in Manvel.

Meridiana Elementary was built to serve Meridiana. Rise Communities partnered with the school district to facilitate the school's development. The construction began in June 2015. Its building has two stories. Meridiana Elementary was scheduled to open in 2016.

== Parks and recreation ==
There is a recreation center, adjacent to Meridiana Elementary, that includes a conservatory, an outdoor play area and fishing area, a cafe, an amphitheater, swimming facilities, and a fitness center.
