= Layden Robinson =

American football player (born 2001)

Profile
- Position: Guard

Personal information
- Born: May 3, 2001 (age 25); Manvel, Texas, U.S.
- Listed height: 6 ft 3 in (1.91 m)
- Listed weight: 311 lb (141 kg)

Career information
- High school: Manvel
- College: Texas A&M (2019–2023)
- NFL draft: 2024: 4th round, 103rd overall pick

Career history
- New England Patriots (2024–2025); Las Vegas Raiders (2025)*; Atlanta Falcons (2026)*
- * Offseason or practice squad member only

Awards and highlights
- 2× Second-team All-SEC (2021, 2023)

Career NFL statistics as of 2024
- Games played: 13
- Games started: 11
- Stats at Pro Football Reference

Layden Robinson (born May 3, 2001) is an American professional football guard. He played college football for the Texas A&M Aggies and was selected by the Patriots in the fourth round of the 2024 NFL draft.

== Early life ==
Robinson grew up in Manvel, Texas, and attended Manvel High School, where he was a top offensive lineman. He was a finalist for the Houston UIL Offensive Player of the Year honor and was a three-time participant in the area all-star game, additionally being named a unanimous first-team all-district choice. He committed to play college football for the Texas A&M Aggies as a three-star prospect.

== College career ==
As a true freshman at Texas A&M in 2019, Robinson appeared in two games while redshirting, being named the team's offensive scout player of the year and freshman strength award winner. He played in all 10 games during the 2020 season. He then started 10 of 12 games during the 2021 season. He started every game at right guard in 2022 and remained starter in 2023, being named a second-team All-Southeastern Conference (SEC) choice in the latter year. He declared for the 2024 NFL draft and ended his collegiate career with 33 starts. He was invited to the 2024 Senior Bowl and NFL Scouting Combine.

== Professional career ==
Pre-draft measurables
Height	Weight	Arm length	Hand span	Wingspan	40-yard dash	10-yard split	20-yard split	20-yard shuttle	Three-cone drill	Vertical jump	Broad jump
6 ft 3 1/2 in (1.92 m)	302 lb (137 kg)	34 5/8 in (0.88 m)	10 1/2 in (0.27 m)	6 ft 9 1/2 in (2.07 m)	5.09 s	1.78 s	2.96 s	4.75 s	7.75 s	26.5 in (0.67 m)	9 ft 3 in (2.82 m)
All values from NFL Combine/Pro Day

=== New England Patriots ===
Robinson was selected in the fourth round (103rd overall) of the 2024 NFL draft by the New England Patriots. He signed his rookie contract with the Patriots on June 5, 2024. He played in 13 games and started 11 at both guard spots.

On August 24, 2025, Robinson was waived/injured by the Patriots and reverted to injured reserve the next day. On October 13, Robinson was waived.

=== Las Vegas Raiders ===
On October 21, 2025, Robinson signed with the Las Vegas Raiders' practice squad. He signed a reserve/future contract with Las Vegas on January 5, 2026. Robinson was waived by the Raiders on May 2.

=== Atlanta Falcons ===
On May 11, 2026, Robinson signed with the Atlanta Falcons after a tryout at their rookie minicamp. He was released by the Falcons on August 17.
