= Kyle Trask =

American football player (born 1998)

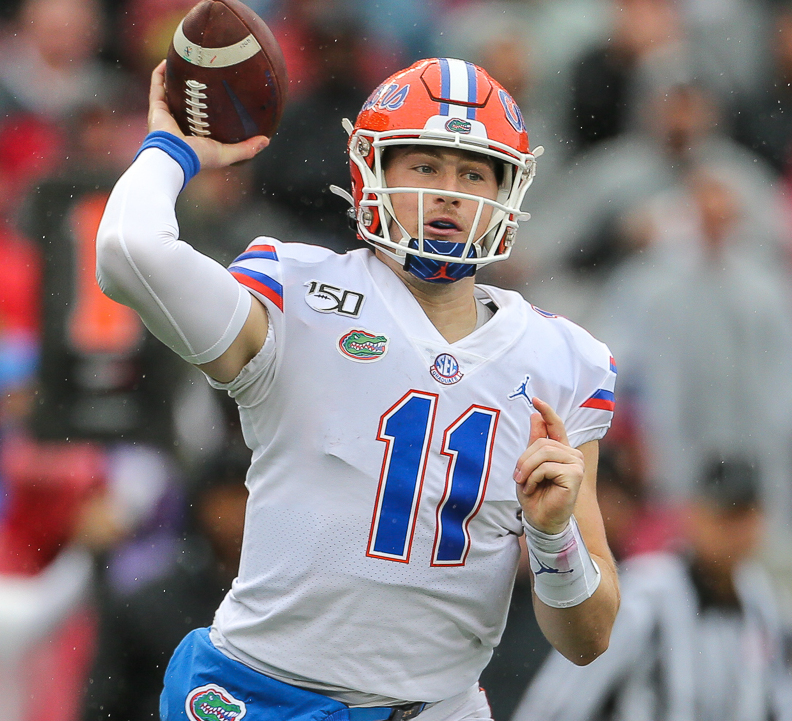
- Trask with the Florida Gators in 2019

No. 10 – Dallas Cowboys
- Position: Quarterback
- Roster status: Practice squad

Personal information
- Born: March 6, 1998 (age 28); Manvel, Texas, U.S.
- Listed height: 6 ft 5 in (1.96 m)
- Listed weight: 236 lb (107 kg)

Career information
- High school: Manvel (TX)
- College: Florida (2016–2020)
- NFL draft: 2021: 2nd round, 64th overall pick

Career history
- Tampa Bay Buccaneers (2021–2024); Atlanta Falcons (2025)*; Carolina Panthers (2026)*; Dallas Cowboys (2026–present)*
- * Offseason or practice squad member only

Awards and highlights
- Earl Campbell Tyler Rose Award (2020); NCAA passing touchdowns leader (2020); Second-team All-SEC (2020)

Career NFL statistics as of 2025
- Passing attempts: 11
- Passing completions: 4
- Completion percentage: 36.4%
- TD–INT: 0–0
- Passing yards: 28
- Passer rating: 44.9
- Stats at Pro Football Reference

Kyle Jacob Trask (born March 6, 1998) is an American professional football quarterback for the Dallas Cowboys of the National Football League (NFL). He played college football for the Florida Gators and was selected by the Tampa Bay Buccaneers in the second round of the 2021 NFL draft.

== Early life ==
Trask attended Manvel High School in Manvel, Texas. He did not start any games at quarterback after his freshman year as he served as a backup to D'Eriq King. He graduated in 2016 and committed to the University of Florida to play college football as a three star recruit.

== College career ==
=== 2016–2018 ===
Trask was redshirted in his first year at Florida in 2016. Trask did not see any action in 2017 at Florida. He was originally intended to compete with Feleipe Franks for the starting job, but suffered an injury which cost him the season.

In 2018, he played in four games as a backup to Franks, completing 14 of 22 passes for 162 yards and a touchdown. His season came to an end after he again injured his foot during practice.

=== 2019 ===
Trask entered his junior year in 2019 again as a backup to Franks. After Franks was injured, Trask took over as the starter. Making his first start since his freshman year of high school, Trask completed 20 of 28 passes with two touchdowns and two interceptions in a win against Tennessee. Trask passed for 363 yards in a 56–0 win over Vanderbilt, the most passing yards in a game by a Florida quarterback since Tim Tebow passed for 482 in the 2010 Sugar Bowl.

=== 2020 ===
In the Gators' first game of 2020 against Ole Miss, Trask eclipsed his own record, passing for 416 yards and six touchdowns, also setting an all-time team record for yards in a conference game in the process. Midway through the season, Trask threw for 474 yards and 4 touchdowns against then #4 Georgia, becoming the first quarterback in Southeastern Conference history to throw four touchdowns in five consecutive games. As the season continued, Trask continued to put up record-setting numbers and became a betting favorite to win the Heisman. Trask finished the season passing for an NCAA-leading 43 touchdowns, breaking the school's single-season passing touchdown record set by Danny Wuerffel in 1996. Trask was named a Heisman Trophy finalist, finishing in fourth place. Trask declared for the 2021 NFL draft following the season.

== Professional career ==
Pre-draft measurables
Height	Weight	Arm length	Hand span	Wingspan	40-yard dash	10-yard split	20-yard split	20-yard shuttle	Three-cone drill	Vertical jump	Broad jump
6 ft 5 1/4 in (1.96 m)	236 lb (107 kg)	33 in (0.84 m)	10 1/8 in (0.26 m)	6 ft 8 5/8 in (2.05 m)	5.08 s	1.70 s	2.96 s	4.38 s	7.08 s	31.5 in (0.80 m)	9 ft 5 in (2.87 m)
All values from Pro Day

=== Tampa Bay Buccaneers ===
Trask was selected by the Tampa Bay Buccaneers in the second round, 64th overall, of the 2021 NFL draft. On June 8, 2021, Trask signed his four-year rookie contract with the Buccaneers, worth $5.54 million and a $1.39 million signing bonus.

In Week 18 of the 2022 season, Trask made his NFL debut against the Atlanta Falcons, passing for 23 yards.

Trask re-signed with the Buccaneers on March 14, 2025. Trask was released by the Buccaneers on August 26.

=== Atlanta Falcons ===
On November 19, 2025, Trask signed with the Atlanta Falcons' practice squad.

=== Carolina Panthers ===
On August 9, 2026, Trask signed with the Carolina Panthers. He was released by Carolina on August 30 as a part of final roster cuts.

=== Dallas Cowboys ===
On October 20, 2026, Trask was signed to the Dallas Cowboys practice squad.

== Career statistics ==
=== NFL ===
Year	Team	Games			Passing									Rushing					Sacks		Fumbles	
Year	Team	GP	GS	Record	Cmp	Att	Pct	Yds	Y/A	Lng	TD	Int	Rtg	Att	Yds	Avg	Lng	TD	Sck	SckY	Fum	Lost
2021	TB	0	0	—	DNP																	
2022	TB	1	0	—	3	9	33.3	23	2.6	9	0	0	42.4	0	0	0.0	0	0	0	0	0	0
2023	TB	2	0	—	0	1	0.0	0	0.0	0	0	0	39.6	1	−1	−1.0	−1	0	0	0	0	0
2024	TB	4	0	—	1	1	100.0	5	5.0	5	0	0	87.5	5	−4	−0.8	0	0	0	0	0	0
Career		7	0	0–0	4	11	36.4	28	2.5	9	0	0	44.9	6	−5	−0.8	0	0	0	0	0	0

=== College ===
Legend
	Led the NCAA
**Bold**	Career high

Season	Team	Games			Passing								Rushing			
Season	Team	GP	GS	Record	Comp	Att	Pct	Yards	Avg	TD	Int	Rate	Att	Yards	Avg	TD
2016	Florida	Redshirt														
2017	Florida	Did not play														
2018	Florida	3	0	–	14	22	63.6	162	7.4	1	0	140.5	5	−4	−0.8	1
2019	Florida	**12**	10	**9–1**	237	354	66.9	2,941	8.3	25	7	156.1	63	8	0.1	**4**
2020	Florida	**12**	**12**	8–4	**301**	**437**	**68.9**	**4,283**	**9.8**	**43**	**8**	**180.0**	**64**	**50**	**0.8**	3
Career		27	22	17–5	552	813	67.9	7,386	9.1	69	15	168.5	132	54	0.4	8

== Personal life ==
Trask was named after Kyle Field, Texas A&M University's football stadium, as his parents and several other family members attended there. His grandfather, Orville Trask, was a defensive tackle and team captain for the Houston Oilers team that won the 1960 and 1961 American Football League championships.

Trask married his girlfriend, mental health counselor and fellow University of Florida alumna McKenzie Liskey, in April 2025.
