= Collin Wright =

American football player (born 2003)

No. 37 – Houston Texans
- Position: Cornerback
- Roster status: Practice squad

Personal information
- Born: December 13, 2003 (age 22)
- Listed height: 6 ft 0 in (1.83 m)
- Listed weight: 195 lb (88 kg)

Career information
- High school: Manvel (Manvel, Texas)
- College: Stanford (2022–2025)
- NFL draft: 2026: undrafted

Career history
- Houston Texans (2026–present)

Career NFL statistics as of Week 4, 2026
- Games played: 1
- Stats at Pro Football Reference

Collin Wright (born December 13, 2003) is an American professional football cornerback for the Houston Texans of the National Football League (NFL). He played college football for the Stanford Cardinal.

== Early life ==
Wright was born on December 13, 2003, and grew up in Missouri City, Texas. He first played football at age five and also participated in soccer, track and lacrosse growing up. Wright attended St. Pius X High School where he played football and was a second-team all-state and first-team all-district selection in his sophomore year. He transferred to Manvel High School the next year. In 2020 at Manvel, he posted 59 tackles and four interceptions. Wright recorded 52 tackles and three interceptions as a senior in 2021. He was first-team all-state as a junior and first-team all-district as a junior and senior. In high school, he also competed in basketball and track. A three-star recruit, he committed to play college football for the Stanford Cardinal.

== College career ==
Wright made four appearances as a true freshman in 2022, recording five tackles while redshirting. He then posted 61 tackles, 5.0 tackles-for-loss (TFLs) and an interception in 2023. In 2024, Wright had 45 tackles, 2.5 TFLs, three interceptions and five passes defended while starting 11 games. He only appeared in nine games in 2025 due to injury, posting 33 tackles and an interception. Although he had a remaining season of eligibility, Wright declared for the NFL draft after the 2025 season, concluding his collegiate career with 144 tackles and five interceptions in 36 games. He graduated from college in 2025 and was invited to the 2026 Senior Bowl.

== Professional career ==
Pre-draft measurables
Height	Weight	Arm length	Hand span	Wingspan	40-yard dash	10-yard split	20-yard split	20-yard shuttle	Vertical jump	Broad jump
6 ft 0 1/4 in (1.84 m)	188 lb (85 kg)	30 3/4 in (0.78 m)	8 3/4 in (0.22 m)	6 ft 3 1/4 in (1.91 m)	4.51 s	1.58 s	2.63 s	4.37 s	39.0 in (0.99 m)	10 ft 3 in (3.12 m)
All values from NFL Combine/Pro Day

After going unselected in the 2026 NFL draft, Wright signed with the Houston Texans as an undrafted free agent. He made the team's final roster for the 2026 season. He was waived from the Texans on October 17, and re-signed to the practice squad.
