= Alvin Community College =

College in Alvin, Texas, U.S.

Alvin College
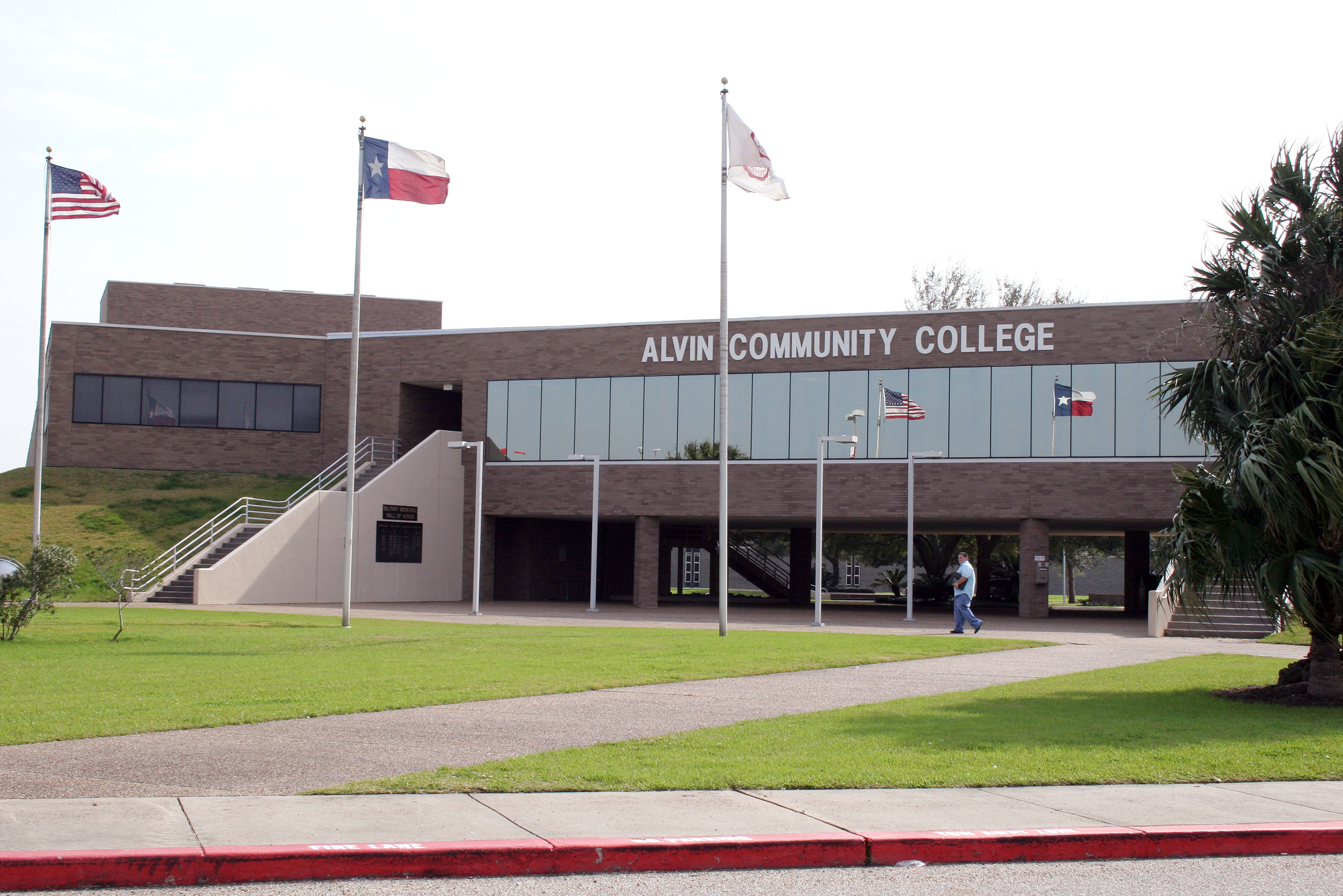
- Alvin College A Building
- Type: Public college
- Established: 1948 (as Alvin Junior College)
- President: Robert J. Exley
- Students: 5,198 (fall 2022)
- Location: Alvin, Texas, United States; 29°23′46″N 95°14′26″W
- Mascot: Dolphin
- Website: www.alvincollege.edu

Alvin College is a public college in Alvin, Texas. Alvin College provides educational opportunities in workforce training, academics, technical fields, adult basic education, and personal development.

As defined by the Texas Legislature, the official service area of ACC is:

- all territory within the Alvin, Danbury, and Pearland school districts, and
- that portion of the Angleton Independent School District annexed by Alvin College prior to September 1, 1995.

Areas within the Alvin College taxation zone include: Alvin, Hillcrest, Iowa Colony, Manvel, and portions of Pearland.

== Academics ==
Alvin College offers degrees in Associate of Applied Science (AAS), Associate of Arts (AA), and Associate of Science (AS), as well as many certificate programs. Alvin College participates in the Texas Common Course Numbering System, or TCCNS, a voluntary cooperative effort by many Texas colleges and universities to create a standard set of course designations for transfer students at the freshman and sophomore level. This allows students to take classes which will transfer to a university. Alvin College Department of Continuing Education and Workforce Development also offers a variety of programs that allow students to further or begin new careers in a number of fields including health care, professional services, industrial arts and more.

== Campuses ==
Alvin College's main campus is located at 3110 Mustang Road in Alvin. In addition, a museum devoted to the baseball career of Alvin's most famous resident, Nolan Ryan, is located on the Alvin College main campus. Ryan studied at Alvin College, then known as Alvin Junior College, during a few off-seasons early in his career.

Alvin College opened a Pearland College Center in 1998 and offered college courses at this location for 15 years. In the spring of 2013, ACC officials announced that the Pearland College Center would close by June and that the center would be sold. The move was prompted by decreasing enrollment figures at the center and by new agreements that had been established with Turner College and Career High School in Pearland Independent School District.

== Notable alumni ==
- Randy Weber, member of the United States Congress.
- Nolan Ryan, former MLB hall of fame pitcher
