= Hillcrest, Texas =

- Village
- Motto: "A Place to Call Home"
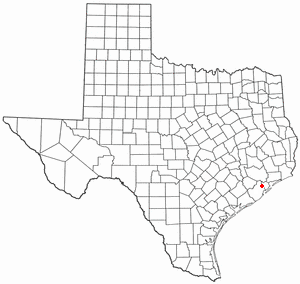
- Location of Hillcrest, Texas

- Coordinates: 29°23′32″N 95°13′24″W
- Country: United States
- State: Texas
- County: Brazoria

Area
  - Total: 0.44 sq mi (1.14 km^{2})
  - Land: 0.44 sq mi (1.14 km^{2})
  - Water: 0 sq mi (0.00 km^{2})
- Elevation: 33 ft (10 m)

Population (2020)
  - Total: 705
  - Density: 1,600/sq mi (618/km^{2})
- Time zone: UTC-6 (Central (CST))
  - Summer (DST): UTC-5 (CDT)
- FIPS code: 48-33980
- GNIS feature ID: 2413558
- Website: www.hillcrestvillagetx.gov

Hillcrest is a village in Brazoria County, Texas, United States. The population was 705 at the 2020 census.

== Geography ==
Hillcrest is located in northeastern Brazoria County at 29°23′36″N 95°13′24″W (29.393222, –95.223406). It is bordered by the city of Alvin to the west.

According to the United States Census Bureau, the village has a total area of 0.42 square miles (1.1 km^{2}), all land.

== Demographics ==
Historical population
Census	Pop.	Note	%±
1970	650		—
1980	771		18.6%
1990	695		−9.9%
2000	722		3.9%
2010	730		1.1%
2020	705		−3.4%
U.S. Decennial Census; 2020 Census

As of the census of 2000, there were 722 people, 262 households, and 221 families residing in the village. The population density was 1,655.7 inhabitants per square mile (639.3/km^{2}). There were 271 housing units at an average density of 621.5 per square mile (240.0/km^{2}). The racial makeup of the village was 95.15% White, 0.55% African American, 0.42% Asian, 2.77% from other races, and 1.11% from two or more races. Hispanic or Latino of any race were 5.96% of the population.

There were 262 households, out of which 32.1% had children under the age of 18 living with them, 77.1% were married couples living together, 4.2% had a female householder with no husband present, and 15.3% were non-families. 13.0% of all households were made up of individuals, and 8.4% had someone living alone who was 65 years of age or older. The average household size was 2.76 and the average family size was 3.02.

In the village, the population was spread out, with 23.0% under the age of 18, 6.5% from 18 to 24, 21.7% from 25 to 44, 33.0% from 45 to 64, and 15.8% who were 65 years of age or older. The median age was 44 years. For every 100 females, there were 95.7 males. For every 100 females age 18 and over, there were 90.4 males.

The median income for a household in the village was $63,889, and the median income for a family was $66,563. Males had a median income of $53,214 versus $31,354 for females. The per capita income for the village was $25,055. About 4.5% of families and 5.0% of the population were below the poverty line, including 4.0% of those under age 18 and 4.0% of those age 65 or over.

== Education ==
Hillcrest is in the Alvin Independent School District. It is zoned to Stevenson and Disney Elementary Schools, Alvin Junior High School, and Alvin High School. Previously Hillcrest was zoned to Fairview Junior High School.

Hillcrest is in the taxation zone of Alvin Community College.
