= Manvel High School =

Public school in Texas, United States

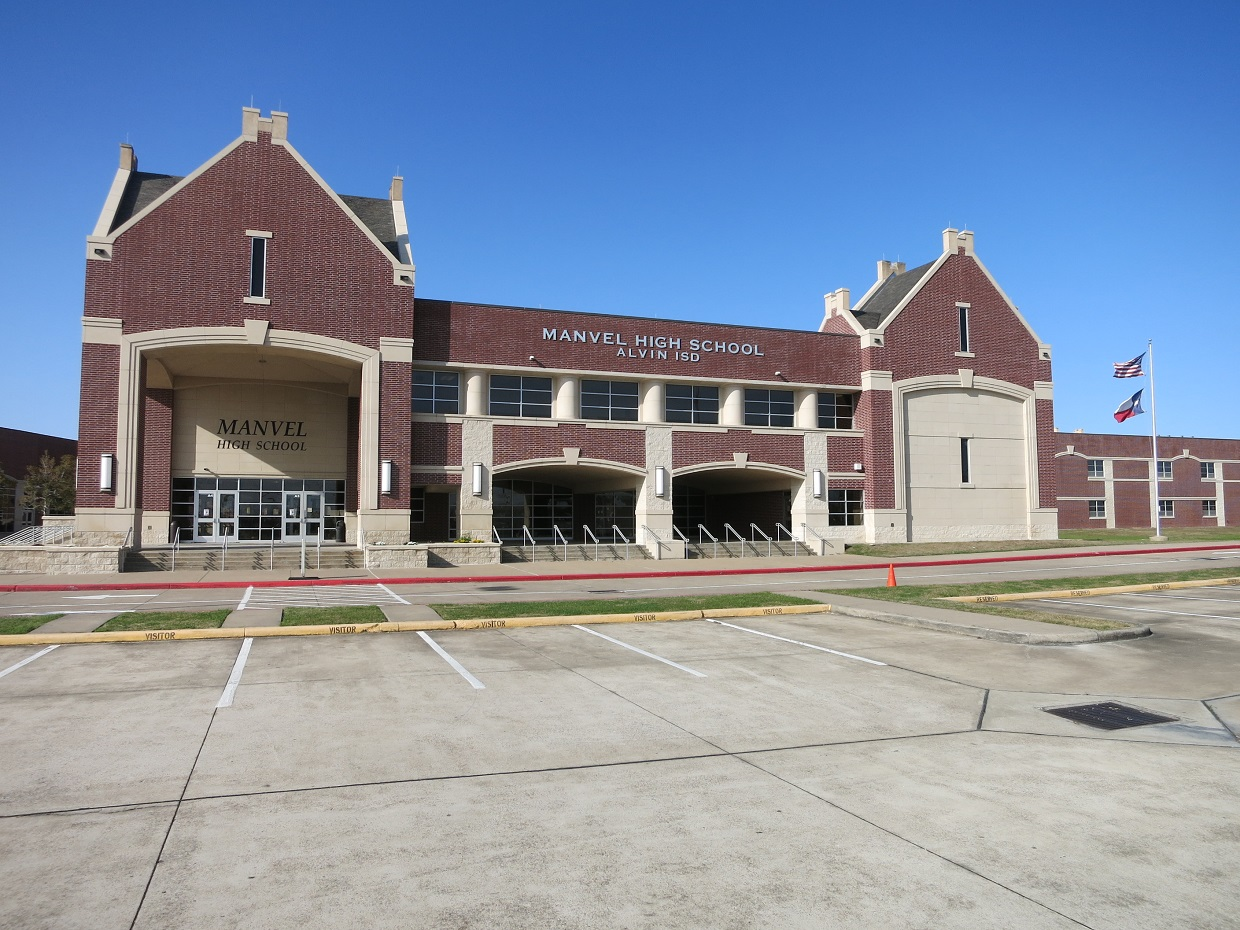

Location
- 19601 Highway 6 Manvel, Brazoria, Texas 77578; United States; 29°28′20″N 95°21′55″W

Information
- School type: Public high school
- Motto: "Hoka Hey"
- Established: 2006
- School district: Alvin Independent School District
- Superintendent: Dr. Rhonda Mason
- Principal: Jamie Baldwin
- Staff: 170.79 (FTE)
- Grades: 9-12
- Enrollment: 2,540 (2023–2024)
- Student to teacher ratio: 14.87
- Colors: Navy, Red & Silver
- Athletics conference: UIL Class AAAAAA
- Mascot: Mavericks
- Football Sports District: 6A-19, Div. 3
- Other Sports District: 6A, Div 3
- Website: www.alvinisd.net/mhs

Manvel High School is a public high school located along Texas State Highway 6 in the city of Manvel, Texas, USA. It is a part of the Alvin Independent School District located in northern Brazoria County and is classified as a 6A school by the UIL. For the 2025-2026 school year, the school was given an "A" by the Texas Education Agency.

== History ==
Manvel High School opened in Fall 2006 with only 9th and 10th grades. The high school, one of five to be established in the suburban areas of Greater Houston in 2006, was projected to have 706 students in its first year. By 2008, it had 1,200 students, and by 2009 it had 1,630 students.

Manvel High School, Alvin ISD's second high school, was established to serve the western portion of Alvin ISD, and provided relief for Alvin High School upon the opening. Darrell Alexander was the first principal of Manvel High School. By April 2006, Alvin ISD had hired assistant principals, athletic coaches, a librarian, and a band director for Manvel High. Its first class, consisting of 275 fourth-year students (seniors), graduated in 2009.

Manvel High was built in two phases. Phase I, with 220,113 square feet (20,449.2 m^{2}) of space, initially had a capacity of 1,500 students and was built for $52 million. Construction on Phase Two, with 128,000 square feet (11,900 m^{2}) of additional space, began in January 2008. Gamma Construction Co. built this phase and SHW Group designed it. The school's capacity increased to 2,500. The expansion included a two-story academic building, with 75,000 square feet (7,000 m^{2}) of space; an 800-seat auditorium; a nine-classroom expansion to the fine arts wing, itself 18,000 square feet (1,700 m^{2}) of space; an expansion of the weight room to 5,000 square feet (460 m^{2}) of space, twice its previous size; and a parenting education and childcare building with 7,000 square feet (650 m^{2}) of space. Construction on the auditorium was delayed due to damages from Hurricane Ike in September 2008; the construction company had to replace the previous sets of steel with new ones. The school's elevator was the first in the city limits of Manvel, and the only elevator until the construction of a hotel just north of the school on Highway 6.

In fall 2022, it was relieved by the opening of Iowa Colony High School.

== Communities served ==
As of 2022 the school serves the northern portion of Manvel above Texas State Highway 6 and a small portion of Iowa Colony above Highway 6.

Manvel previously served all of Manvel, all of Iowa Colony, and additional portions of unincorporated Brazoria County (including Lakes of Savannah, the area around Rosharon). Its service area formerly included Meridiana.

It formerly served Shadow Creek Ranch and other parts of Pearland, until the opening of Shadow Creek High School.

== Athletics ==
The Manvel Mavericks compete in these sports -

- Baseball
- Basketball
- Cross country
- Football
- Golf
- Powerlifting
- Soccer
- Softball
- Swimming and diving
- Tennis
- Track and field
- Volleyball

In 2006 Kirk Martin was hired as the assistant athletic director and as the American football coach. The first volleyball coach previously worked in schools in Illinois and was last working as a coach and teacher at Clear Creek High School. Varsity volleyball was scheduled to begin in 2007. Varsity American football games for Manvel High began in 2008.

The school adopted a Lakota Sioux-era rallying cry, "Hoka Hey," for use in athletic competitions.

=== State titles ===
- Girls Basketball
  - 2014 (5A)
- Boys Track
  - 2015 (6A)

==== State finalist ====
- Football
  - 2011 (4A/D2) Lost to Aledo 49-28 in championship game
  - 2017 (5A/D1) Lost to Dallas Highland Park 53-49 in championship game

== Academics ==
=== State titles ===
- News Writing
  - 2010(4A) - Cory Ryncarz
- Social Studies
  - 2011(4A) - Cory Ryncarz

== School culture ==
The teacher of the year and paraprofessional of the year each receive a letter jacket after being awarded as such. Over the years, multiple MHS students have been lost to car accidents and other events; in their honor, there is a tree and a plaque bearing their names in front of the school.

== Student discipline ==
Phillip Mena and Jill Courtney of KHOU-TV wrote that the number of fights that occurred in the 2011-2012 and 2012-2013 school years, 48, were "not out of the ordinary for similar-sized schools in the area." In April 2014, a student was stabbed in a fight.

== Notable alumni ==
- Terry Allen (2012), basketball player who plays professionally in Japan
- Koda Martin (2014), NFL offensive guard
- Brianna Turner (2014), WNBA player
- D'Eriq King (2016), XFL quarterback and coach for the SMU Mustangs
- Adriel Sanes (2016), Olympics swimming
- Kyle Trask (2016), NFL quarterback
- Keylon Stokes (2017), former college football wide receiver
- Deneric Prince (2018), NFL running back
- Layden Robinson (2019), NFL offensive guard
- Collin Wright (2022), NFL cornerback
