= Gunner Olszewski =

American football player (born 1996)

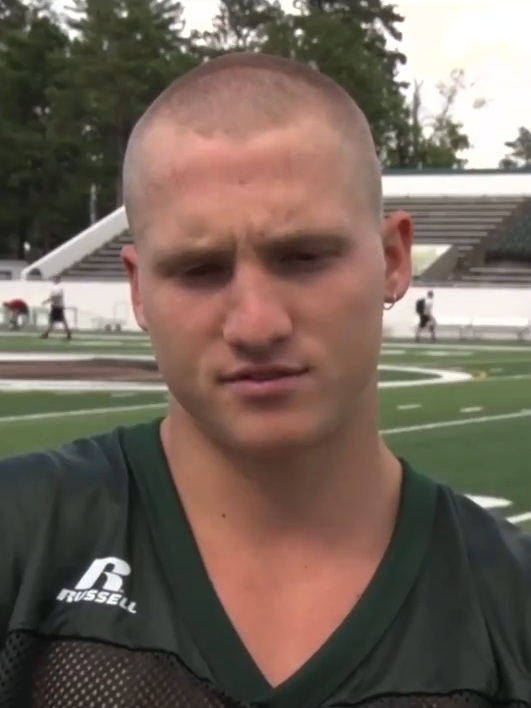
- Olszewski with the Bemidji State Beavers in 2017

No. 80 – New York Giants
- Positions: Wide receiver, return specialist
- Roster status: Injured reserve

Personal information
- Born: November 26, 1996 (age 29); Alvin, Texas, U.S.
- Listed height: 5 ft 10 in (1.78 m)
- Listed weight: 190 lb (86 kg)

Career information
- High school: Alvin
- College: Bemidji State (2015–2018)
- NFL draft: 2019: undrafted

Career history
- New England Patriots (2019–2021); Pittsburgh Steelers (2022–2023); New York Giants (2023–present)

Awards and highlights
- First-team All-Pro (2020) (Note: Selected as a punt returner); NFL punt return yards leader (2020); NSIC Defensive Player of the Year (2018); First-team Division II All-American (2018); NSIC Newcomer of the Year (2015)

Career NFL statistics as of 2025
- Receptions: 25
- Receiving yards: 325
- Receiving touchdowns: 2
- Return yards: 2,976
- Return touchdowns: 2
- Stats at Pro Football Reference

Kaleb Gunner Olszewski (/oʊˈʃɛski/ oh-SHESS-kee) (born November 26, 1996) is an American professional football wide receiver and return specialist for the New York Giants of the National Football League. He played college football for the Bemidji State Beavers as a cornerback. He previously played for the New England Patriots and the Pittsburgh Steelers.

== Early life ==
Olszewski was born in Alvin, Texas, to Eric and Collette Olszewski. He graduated from Alvin High School, where he played football, where he set school records for tackles and interceptions, and baseball; He has two brothers: one older and one younger.

== College career ==
Olszewski played for the Bemidji State University Beavers in Bemidji, Minnesota, a Division II school, as a cornerback. In his 2015 freshman season, Olszewski was named Northern Sun Intercollegiate Conference (NSIC) Newcomer of the Year. Olszewski won Defensive Player of the Year in the NSIC as a senior in 2018. He also returned punts and held for field goals and extra points.

== Professional career ==
Pre-draft measurables
Height	Weight	Arm length	Hand span	Wingspan	40-yard dash	10-yard split	20-yard split	20-yard shuttle	Three-cone drill	Vertical jump	Broad jump
5 ft 9 5/8 in (1.77 m)	178 lb (81 kg)	29 1/8 in (0.74 m)	8 1/2 in (0.22 m)	5 ft 10 1/8 in (1.78 m)	4.56 s	1.59 s	2.60 s	4.37 s	6.88 s	36.0 in (0.91 m)	9 ft 10 in (3.00 m)
All values from Pro Day

=== New England Patriots ===
==== 2019 season ====
Olszewski was not selected in the 2019 NFL draft. After the draft, he was invited to participate in rookie minicamps by the Minnesota Vikings, who used him at cornerback, and the New England Patriots, who used him at wide receiver. On May 23, 2019, after the retirement of Jared Veldheer gave the Patriots a roster opening, they signed Olszewski to an undrafted free agent contract. The three-year deal had a $2,500 signing bonus.

On August 31, the day that teams were required to trim their preseason 90-man rosters to 53-man rosters, the Patriots told Olszewski that morning that he would be waived; instead, the Patriots kept him after trading cornerback Keion Crossen less than an hour before the deadline.

He made his NFL debut in the Patriots' 33–3 Week 1 win against the Pittsburgh Steelers, returning two punts for 35 yards (averaging 17.5 yards per return). He recorded his first receptions in Week 6 against the New York Giants; targeted three times, he had two receptions, for five and 29 yards. He was placed on injured reserve on November 19, 2019, with ankle and hamstring injuries.

==== 2020 season ====
On September 12, 2020, Olszewski was placed on injured reserve with a foot injury. He was activated on October 5, before the team's Week 4 game against the Kansas City Chiefs; because of the COVID-19 pandemic, the minimum stay on IR for the 2020 season was reduced to three games.

In Week 12, against the Arizona Cardinals, Olszewski returned a punt 82 yards to the end zone, but it was called back because of an illegal block by linebacker Anfernee Jennings; after the penalty, it was recorded as a 58-yard return. A week later, against the Los Angeles Chargers, Olszewski had three punt returns totaling 145 yards. His first went for 70 yards and was the first touchdown of his career; he followed it up with returns of 14 and 61 yards. He also added the first receiving touchdown of his career in the fourth quarter, catching a 38-yard touchdown pass from backup quarterback Jarrett Stidham in garbage time during the Patriots' 45–0 shutout. Olszewski was named the AFC Special Teams Player of the Week for his performance in Week 13. He finished the season with a league-high 346 punt return yards on 20 returns. His average of 17.3 yards per return was a franchise record and the second-highest total since the AFL-NFL merger (after Leodis McKelvin's 18.7 yards per return in 2012).

In January 2021 Olszewski was named to the 2020 AP All-Pro first team as a punt returner. He is the first Patriots punt returner so honored. He received 28 of 50 votes at punt returner, as well as one vote for special teamer. One voter, Aaron Schatz of Football Outsiders, noted that Olszewski's punt returns had twice the value of any other punt returner.

==== 2021 season ====
Through 9 games, Olszewski ranked second in punt return yards, with 248 yards on 18 returns. In his second game in SoFi Stadium against the Chargers, Olszewski had four returns for 80 yards, with three returns of 20+ yards, a feat last accomplished by a Patriot in 2000 (Troy Brown).

=== Pittsburgh Steelers ===
==== 2022 season ====
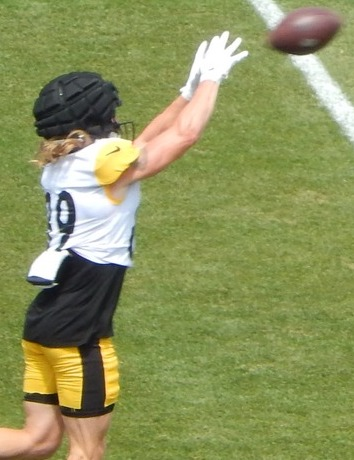
Olszewski catching a pass during a Steelers practice in 2023

On March 21, 2022, Olszewski signed a two-year contract with the Pittsburgh Steelers. Olszewski primarily played on the Steelers' special teams unit and saw limited playing time as a receiver. He finished the 2022 season having caught five passes on seven targets for 53 yards.

==== 2023 season ====
Olszewski would make his only catch of the 2023 season with the Steelers during Week 2's divisional matchup against the Cleveland Browns. He would then fumble the catch, causing the Steelers to lose possession. During this same game, Olszewski went in as the team's kick returner. After a Cleveland field goal, he caught the Browns' kickoff at the Steelers' nine yard line near the sideline and toe tapped in bounds before leaving the field of play, positioning the Steelers deep in their own territory. Had Olszewski not made the catch and let the ball bounce out of bounds on its own, the Steelers would've automatically been placed at their 40-yard line as NFL rules dictate a kickoff out of bounds is an immediate touchback with a 15-yard penalty.

He was released on October 21, 2023.

=== New York Giants ===
==== 2023 season ====
On October 23, 2023, the New York Giants signed Olszewski to their practice squad, and promoted to the active roster five days later. In Week 17 against the Los Angeles Rams, Olszewski returned a punt 94 yards for a touchdown. At first it was reported that he had broken the club record set by Amani Toomer. However, research revealed that the record of 95 yards set by Al Bloodgood on September 30, 1928, still stands.

==== 2024 season ====
On March 11, 2024, Olszewski re-signed with the Giants. He suffered a groin injury before Week 1 and was placed on injured reserve on September 14.

==== 2025 season ====
On July 29, 2025, Olszewski re-signed with the Giants. On September 21, following an injury to placekicker Graham Gano during a Week 3 match-up against the Kansas City Chiefs, Olszewski stood in at the position of holder during a PAT attempt in place of punter Jamie Gillan, who replaced Gano as kicker. During a 34–24 loss to the San Francisco 49ers, Olszewski caught a 24-yard touchdown on his first catch and target of the season, his first receiving touchdown since 2020. In a 34–27 loss to the Detroit Lions, he threw his first career pass to Jameis Winston on a trick play, resulting in a 33-yard touchdown. In a 33–15 loss to the New England Patriots, Olszewski left the game with a concussion after being tackled on a kickoff return. The tackle caused a fumble, which the Patriots recovered, and was severe enough that it knocked some of the paint and part of the decal on his helmet. In week 18 against the Dallas Cowboys, Olszewski led the Giants with 8 catches for 102 yards, almost half of his career yardage total up to that point.

==== 2026 season ====
On March 6, 2026, Olszewski re-signed with the Giants. On June 1, the Giants placed him on injured reserve after he suffered a torn Achilles during OTAs.

== NFL career statistics ==
Legend
	Led the league
**Bold**	Career best

=== Regular season ===
Year	Team	Games		Receiving					Rushing					KO/Punt Returns					Fumbles																					
Year	Team	GP	GS	Rec	Yds	Y/R	Lng	TD	Att	Yds	Y/A	Lng	TD	Ret	Yds	Y/R	Lng	TD	Fum	Lost																				
2019	NE	8	0	2	34	**17.0**	29	0	0	0	0.0	0	**0**	20	179	9.0	22	0	**1**	1																				
2020	NE	13	**2**	**5**	**62**	12.4	**38**	**1**	5	23	4.6	12	**0**	38	**764** (Note: Led the league in punts return yardage (346).)	**20.1** (Note: Led the league in yards per punt return (17.3).)	70	**1** (Note: Led the league in punts returned for touchdown (1).)	**1**	**0**																				
2021	NE	**16**	0	2	31	15.5	22	0	1	9	9.0	9	**0**	44	725	16.5	37	0	3	1																				
2022	PIT	**16**	**2**	**5**	53	10.6	31	0	**8**	**39**	**4.9**	**18**	**0**	11	101	9.2	27	0	2	1																				
2023	PIT	2	0	1	0	0.0	0	0	0	0	0.0	0	0	3	32	10.7	24	0	2	2																				
2023	NYG	9	0	0	0	0.0	0	0	0	0	0.0	0	0	20	244	12.2	**94**	1	2	1																				
2024	NYG	0	0	—	Did not play due to injury																																			
2025	NYG	16	1	10	145	14.5	28	1	0	0	0.0	0	0	50	898	17.96	29	0	1	1																				
2026	NYG	0	0	—	Did not play due to injury																Career	81	5	25	325	14.5	38	2	14	71	5.1	18	0	189	2,972	15.7	94	2	12	7

=== Postseason ===
Year	Team	Games		Returning					Fumbles	
Year	Team	GP	GS	Ret	Yds	Y/R	Lng	TD	Fum	Lost
2019	NE	0	0	Did not play due to injury						
2021	NE	1	0	5	103	20.6	26	0	0	0
Career		1	0	5	103	20.6	26	0	0	0
