= Iowa Colony, Texas =

City in Brazoria County, Texas, United States

- City
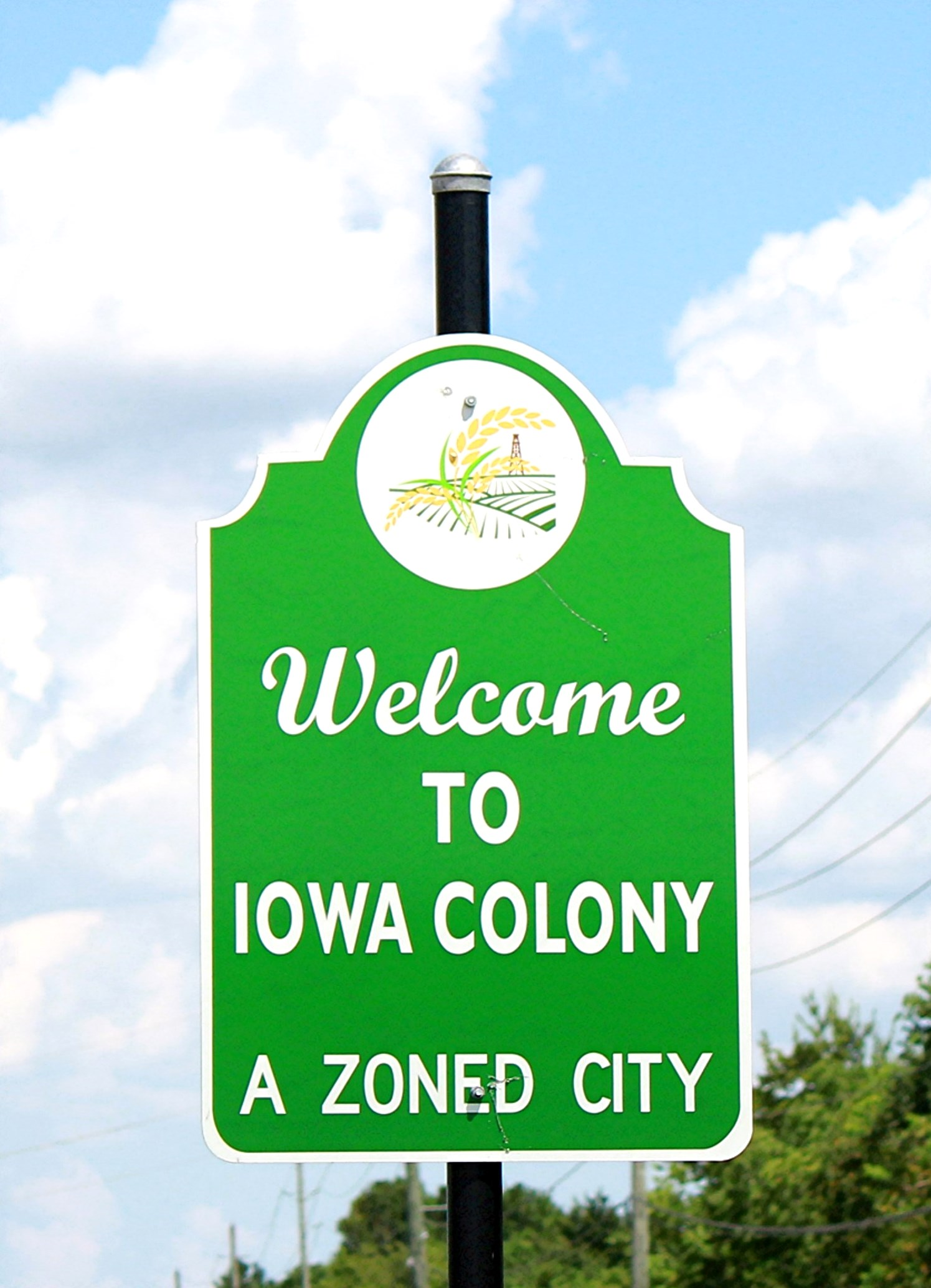
- Sign
- Motto: "Where We Make It Happen"
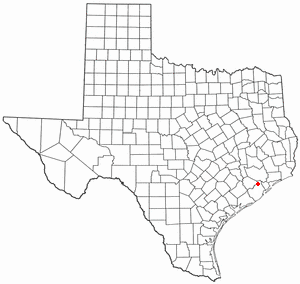
- Location of Iowa Colony, Texas

- Coordinates: 29°26′35″N 95°24′56″W
- Country: United States
- State: Texas
- County: Brazoria
- Founded: 1908
- Incorporated: 1973

Government
  - Type: Council–manager government
  - Mayor: Wil Kennedy
  - City Manager: Robert Hemminger

Area
  - Total: 9.45 sq mi (24.48 km^{2})
  - Land: 9.44 sq mi (24.44 km^{2})
  - Water: 0.015 sq mi (0.04 km^{2})
- Elevation: 59 ft (18 m)

Population (2020)
  - Total: 8,154
  - Density: 343/sq mi (132.3/km^{2})
- Time zone: UTC-6 (Central (CST))
  - Summer (DST): UTC-5 (CDT)
- ZIP code: 77583 (main), 77578 (portion of Iowa Colony)
- Area code: 281
- FIPS code: 48-36092
- GNIS feature ID: 1378484
- Website: www.iowacolonytx.gov

Iowa Colony is an incorporated Home Rule City in Brazoria County, Texas, United States, in the Houston metropolitan area. As of the 2020 Census, the city had a population of 8,154.

== History ==
Iowa Colony was founded in 1908 by the Emigration Land Company of Des Moines, Iowa, and received its name from Iowans G. I. Huffmann and Robert Beard. The community received a post office in 1919, and rice farming was introduced there in 1920. Although not directly on a railroad line, Iowa Colony was served by the Gulf, Colorado and Santa Fe line through nearby Manvel. The population grew slowly to twenty-seven and remained at that level until the mid-1960s. The discovery of oil in 1948 brought regional employment to the area. By 1961 the Iowa Colony post office had closed, yet during the 1960s the settlement began to grow vigorously as part of the greater Houston area. By 1973 Iowa Colony had been incorporated (in 1972), and by 1989 the town listed a population of 661. The city hall, community center, and municipal court are all housed in the same building, next to the fire department. In 1990 the population was 675. The population was 1,170 in 2010. Iowa Colony showed unprecedented growth, with an estimated 2019 population of 3,233. In 2020, they surpassed the 5,000 population requirement to seek home rule status, and subsequently voted to pass the city's Home Rule Charter on November 3, 2020. The city website further states in 2021 that the population has exceeded 8000, growing at a rate of 400%.

Iowa Colony gained notoriety in the early 1990s as a major speed trap and was an inspiration for a Texas statute limiting municipal profits from speed traps.

== Geography ==
Iowa Colony is located in northern Brazoria County at 29°26′35″N 95°24′56″W (29.442963, –95.415607). It is on Texas State Highway 288 south of Pearland city limits. Downtown Houston is 22 miles (35 km) to the north.

According to the United States Census Bureau, the city has a total area of 7.3 square miles (19.0 km^{2}), of which 0.015 square miles (0.04 km^{2}), or 0.21%, is water.

== Demographics ==
Historical population
Census	Pop.	Note	%±
1980	585		—
1990	675		15.4%
2000	804		19.1%
2010	1,170		45.5%
2020	8,154		596.9%
2025 (est.)	20,503	▲	151.4%
U.S. Decennial Census

Iowa Colony racial composition as of 2020 (NH = Non-Hispanic) (Note: Note: the US Census treats Hispanic/Latino as an ethnic category. This table excludes Latinos from the racial categories and assigns them to a separate category. Hispanics/Latinos can be of any race.)
Race	Number	Percentage
White (NH)	2,039	25.0%
Black or African American (NH)	3,073	37.68%
Native American or Alaska Native (NH)	15	0.18%
Asian (NH)	396	4.85%
Pacific Islander (NH)	4	0.04%
Some Other Race (NH)	25	0.03%
Mixed/Multi-Racial (NH)	281	3.44%
Hispanic or Latino	2,321	28.46%
Total	8,154	

As of the 2020 United States census, there were 8,154 people, 1,750 households, and 1,508 families residing in the city.

As of the census of 2000, there were 804 people, 279 households, and 219 families residing in the city. The population density was 139.7 inhabitants per square mile (53.9/km^{2}). There were 302 housing units at an average density of 52.5 per square mile (20.3/km^{2}). The racial makeup of the city was 73.01% White, 6.72% African American, 0.12% Native American, 7.34% Asian, 11.19% from other races, and 1.62% from two or more races. Hispanic or Latino of any race were 25.12% of the population.

There were 279 households, out of which 35.1% had children under the age of 18 living with them, 65.2% were married couples living together, 9.0% had a female householder with no husband present, and 21.5% were non-families. 19.0% of all households were made up of individuals, and 4.7% had someone living alone who was 65 years of age or older. The average household size was 2.88 and the average family size was 3.29.

In the city, the population was spread out, with 28.0% under the age of 18, 7.5% from 18 to 24, 29.9% from 25 to 44, 24.5% from 45 to 64, and 10.2% who were 65 years of age or older. The median age was 36 years. For every 100 females, there were 103.0 males. For every 100 females age 18 and over, there were 99.7 males.

The median income for a household in the city was $47,019, and the median income for a family was $50,000. Males had a median income of $40,313 versus $28,500 for females. The per capita income for the city was $18,935. About 6.6% of families and 6.1% of the population were below the poverty line, including 3.7% of those under age 18 and 15.2% of those age 65 or over.

== Education ==
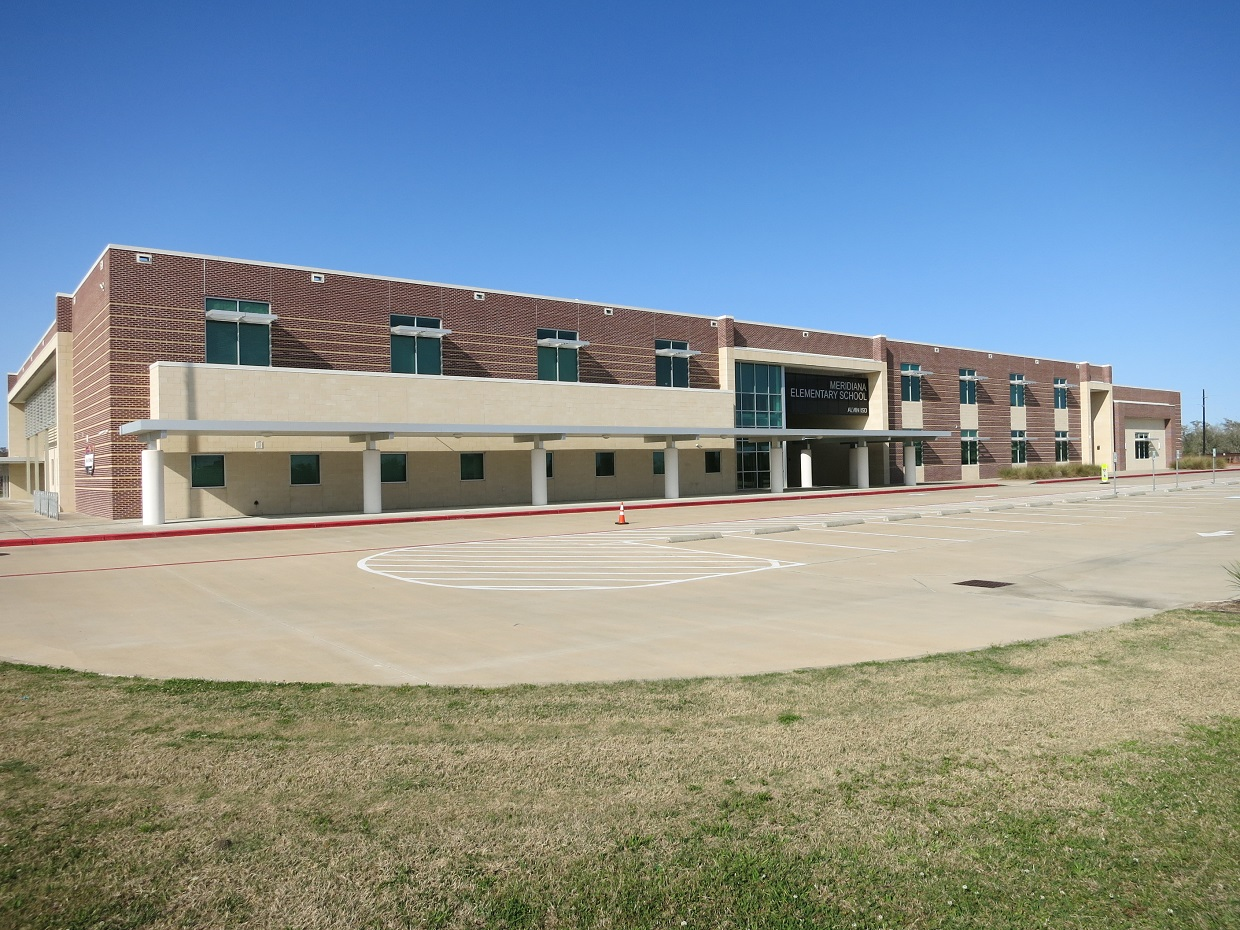
Meridiana Elementary School in Iowa Colony

Students in residential-zoned portions of Iowa Colony attend schools in the Alvin Independent School District.

Elementary schools include:

- Meridiana Elementary School in Iowa Colony
- Sanchez Elementary School
- Savannah Lakes Elementary School (small portion far north)

Secondary zoning includes:

- Jackie Doucet Caffey Junior High in Manvel (for most of Iowa Colony) or Manvel Junior High School (small portion far north)
- Iowa Colony High School In Iowa Colony (for almost all of Iowa Colony) or Manvel High School (sections north of SH 6)

Meridiana Elementary School was built to serve the Meridiana master-planned community. Rise Communities, the developer of Meridiana, partnered with the school district to facilitate the school's development.

In 1911 and 1912, an elementary school and a previous version of Iowa Colony High School, respectively, were established. Iowa Colony's school district later became a part of Alvin ISD. Alvin High School served all Iowa Colony residents, until fall 2006, when Manvel High opened to immediately accept 9th and 10th grades and phase in 11th and 12th grades in two years. After 2006 and prior to Iowa Colony High's opening, Manvel High's boundary included all of Iowa Colony. Prior to the opening of Meridiana Elementary, zoned elementary schools were E. C. Mason, Don Jeter, and Savannah Lakes in Manvel. Residents were divided between Manvel Junior High and Fairview Junior High in Alvin. In 2015 Manvel Junior High became the junior high for almost all of Iowa Colony, except a small portion zoned to Rodeo Palms Junior High. In 2022 Iowa Colony High will open, relieving Manvel High.

Additionally, Alvin Community College provides basic undergraduate courses and adult education. Iowa Colony is in the ACC taxation zone.

== See also ==
- List of municipalities in Texas
