= Literary Criticism (UIL) =

Academic event sanctioned by the University Interscholastic League

Literary Criticism is one of several academic events sanctioned by the University Interscholastic League in the U.S. state of Texas. The contest began in the 1986–87 school year.

Literary Criticism is designed to test students' knowledge of literary history and of critical terms, and ability in literary criticism. The text A Handbook to Literature by William Harmon and C. Hugh Holman (currently, either the 8th, 9th, or 10th edition may be used), state adopted texts, and the announced reading list for the current year will be used as sources for the tests.

== Eligibility ==
Students in Grade 9 to Grade 12 are eligible to enter. All grades compete in one division.

Each school may send up to four students. However, in districts with more than eight schools the district executive committee can limit participation to three students per school. In order for a school to participate in team competition, the school must send at least three students.

== Rules and scoring ==
The test consists of four parts, which must be completed in 90 minutes. A time signal is given when 15 minutes remain.

The questions may be answered in any order.

Part One consists of thirty questions involving the use of A Handbook to Literature. Part Two consists of twenty questions involving the texts from the announced reading list. Part Three requires a contestant to answer fifteen critical questions about various poems or literary excerpts. Finally, the contestant must write a short essay dealing with a specified topic about a short literary passage.

One point is given for each correct answer in Part One and two points for each correct answer in Parts Two and Three. The essay is not scored but is used as a tiebreaker for individual competition. The contestant who does not write an essay is disqualified from the competition.

== Determining the winner ==
The top three individuals and the top team (based on the scores of the top three individuals) will advance to the next round. In addition, within each region, the highest-scoring second place team from all district competitions advances as the "wild card" to the regional competition (provided the team has four members) and, within the state, the highest-scoring second place team from all regional competitions advances as the wild card to the state competition. Members of advancing teams who were not placed individually remain eligible to compete for individual awards at higher levels.

For individual competition, the tiebreaker is the essay. Three judges (none of whom shall be the student's coach) evaluate the essay based on the following criteria:

- how well the contestant followed the instructions accompanying the questions;
- the excellence of the literary insights expressed;
- the effectiveness of the written expression; and
- the grammatical correctness of the writing.

For team competition, the score of the fourth-place individual is used as the tiebreaker (not including the essay). If a team has only three members it is not eligible to participate in the tiebreaker. If the fourth-place score still results in a tie, the individual tiebreaker rules will not apply, and all remaining tied teams will advance. At the state level ties for first place are not broken.

For district meet academic championship and district meet sweepstakes awards, points are awarded to the school as follows:

- Individual places: 1st–15, 2nd–12, 3rd–10, 4th–8, 5th–6, and 6th–4.
- Team places: 1st–10 and 2nd–5.
- The maximum number of points a school can earn in Literary Criticism is 37.

== List of prior winners ==
=== Individual ===
NOTE: For privacy reasons, only the winning school is shown.

School Year	Class A	Class AA	Class AAA	Class AAAA	Class AAAAA
1987–88	Yantis	Blanco	Atlanta	Schertz Clemens	San Antonio Marshall
1988–89	Happy	Blanco	Bishop	College Station A&M Consolidated	Corpus Christi Carroll
1989–90	Skidmore-Tynan	Blanco	Sealy	Schertz Clemens	Wichita Falls Rider
1990–91	Louise	Lytle	Dimmitt	Schertz Clemens	Sugar Land Kempner
1991–92	Anton	Clarendon	Burnet	Austin Travis	Odessa Permian
1992–93	Anton	Wheeler	Kaufman	Friendswood Clear Brook	McAllen
1993–94	Utopia	Lytle	Stafford	Longview Pine Tree	Weatherford
1994–95	Martin's Mill	Wallis Brazos	Alpine	Uvalde	San Antonio Clark
1995–96	Lindsay	Henrietta	Mont Belvieu Barbers Hill	Bridge City	North Garland
1996–97	Martin's Mill	Canadian	Lytle	Grapevine	Klein
1997–98	Martin's Mill	Buffalo	Mont Belvieu Barbers Hill	Stephenville	San Antonio Clark
1998–99	Wheeler	Van Alstyne	Atlanta	Friendswood	San Antonio Clark
1999–2000	Valley View	Lindsay	Atlanta	Brenham	San Antonio Clark
2000–01	Menard	Weimar	Mont Belvieu Barbers Hill	Mission Sharyland	Klein
2001–02	Santa Anna	Hale Center	Lytle	Friendswood	Corpus Christi Moody
2002–03	Martin's Mill	Hale Center	Lytle	Dripping Springs	Del Rio
2003–04	Martin's Mill	S&S Consolidated	Canton	Dickinson	Arlington Lamar
2004–05	Lindsay	Salado	Liberty	Aledo	South Texas Business, Education, and Technical
2005–06	Quanah	Salado	Kemp	Dayton	Austin Westlake
2006–07	Martin's Mill	Weimar	Atlanta	Stephenville	Flower Mound
2007–08	Frost	Weimar	Iowa Park	Lindale	Cedar Park
2008–09	Winters	Dimmitt	Liberty	Lindale	Southlake Carroll
2011–12					Katy Seven Lakes

=== Team ===
NOTE: UIL did not recognize a team championship in this event until the 1992–93 scholastic year.

School Year	Class A	Class AA	Class AAA	Class AAAA	Class AAAAA
1992–93	Anton	(tie) Krum/Wheeler	Stafford	Friendswood Clear Brook	Odessa Permian
1993–94	Utopia	(tie) Krum/Lytle	Atlanta	Longview Pine Tree	Grapevine
1994–95	Lindsay	Skidmore-Tynan	Stafford	Denison	Sugar Land Elkins
1995–96	Lindsay	Henrietta	Eastland	Bridge City	Plano East
1996–97	Wheeler	Lindsay	Henrietta	Grapevine	San Antonio Clark
1997–98	Martin's Mill	Salado	Atlanta	Bridge City	San Antonio Clark
1998–99	Wheeler	Idalou	Atlanta	Borger	Plano East
1999–2000	Martin's Mill	Salado	Atlanta	Grapevine	Midland Lee
2000–01	Menard	Hale Center	Atlanta	Snyder	Abilene
2001–02	Lindsay	Idalou	Atlanta	Friendswood	Plano East
2002–03	Lindsay	S&S Consolidated	Lytle	Stephenville	San Antonio Clark
2003–04	Martin's Mill	Weimar	Abilene Wylie	Friendswood	San Antonio Clark
2004–05	Martin's Mill	Salado	Liberty	Aledo	Irving MacArthur
2005–06	Quanah	S&S Consolidated	Mont Belvieu Barbers Hill	Aledo	Austin Westlake
2006–07	Martin's Mill	(tie) S&S Consolidated/Weimar	Liberty	Friendswood	Keller
2007–08	Martin's Mill	S&S Consolidated	Atlanta	Friendswood	Southlake Carroll
2008–09	Martin's Mill	Weimar	Liberty	Aledo	Flower Mound
2011–12					Katy Seven Lakes
