= Koda Martin =

American football player (born 1995)

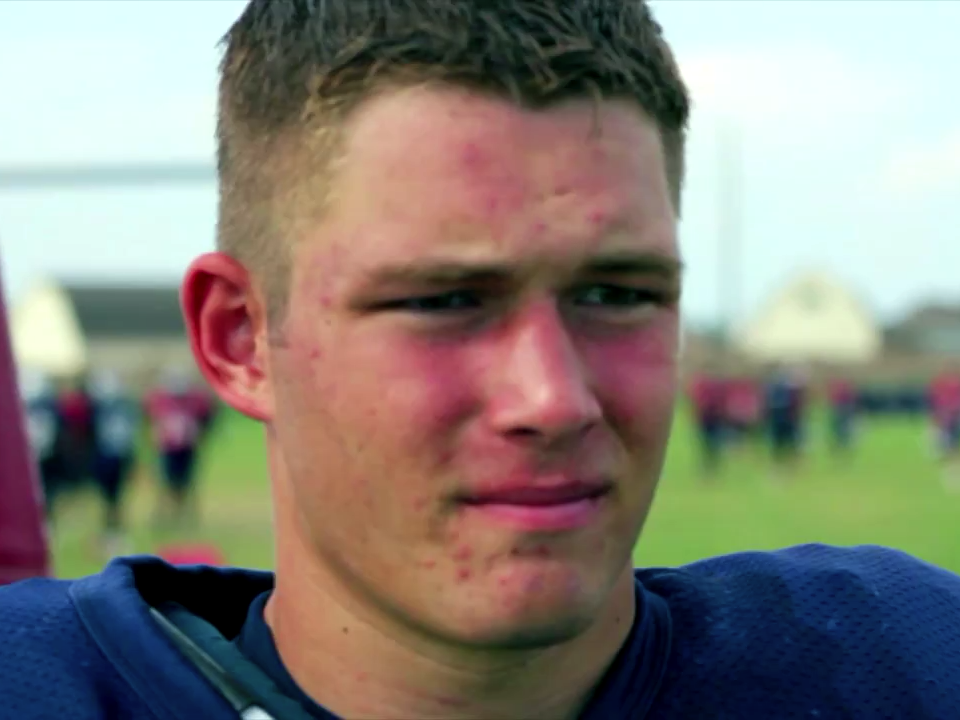
- Martin in 2013

Profile
- Position: Offensive guard

Personal information
- Born: August 21, 1995 (age 31); El Paso, Texas, U.S.
- Listed height: 6 ft 6 in (1.98 m)
- Listed weight: 304 lb (138 kg)

Career information
- High school: Manvel (TX)
- College: Texas A&M; Syracuse
- NFL draft: 2019: undrafted

Career history
- Los Angeles Chargers (2019)*; Arizona Cardinals (2020–2022); New Orleans Saints (2023)*; St. Louis Battlehawks (2024)*
- * Offseason or practice squad member only

Career NFL statistics
- Games played: 2
- Stats at Pro Football Reference

Dakoda Kirk Martin (born August 21, 1995) is an American football offensive guard. He played college football for Texas A&M and Syracuse and was originally signed as an undrafted free agent by the Los Angeles Chargers.

== Early life and education ==
Koda Martin was born on August 21, 1995, in El Paso, Texas. He attended high school in Manvel, being coached by his father Kirk. As a senior in high school, Martin earned second-team Class 5A all-state honors after making 72 tackles with nine sacks, seven forced fumbles and 12 tackles for losses at the defensive end position. After the year he accepted a scholarship offer from Texas A&M University, redshirting during his freshman year of 2014. He appeared in eight games in 2015, scoring a touchdown on defense against Ball State.

As a sophomore in 2016, Martin appeared in 13 games, making four starts. He started thrice at offensive tackle and once at tight end. He appeared in 13 games as well the following year, starting all but one at the left tackle position. He left the school in May 2018 as a transfer to Syracuse. He started all 13 games as a senior with Syracuse, leading the team in snaps and earning a spot on the 2018 All-ACC football team.

== Professional career ==
Pre-draft measurables
| Height | Weight | Arm length | Hand span | 40-yard dash | 10-yard split | 20-yard split | 20-yard shuttle | Three-cone drill | Vertical jump | Broad jump | Bench press |
|---|---|---|---|---|---|---|---|---|---|---|---|
| 6 ft 6 5/8 in (2.00 m) | 300 lb (136 kg) | 32 5/8 in (0.83 m) | 9 1/2 in (0.24 m) | 5.19 s | 1.78 s | 3.01 s | 4.70 s | 7.50 s | 27.0 in (0.69 m) | 8 ft 6 in (2.59 m) | 24 reps |
All values from Pro Day

=== Los Angeles Chargers ===
After going unselected in the 2019 NFL draft, Martin was signed as an undrafted free agent by the Los Angeles Chargers on April 27. He was waived/injured on June 28 and placed on injured reserve three days later. He was released in August 2020.

=== Arizona Cardinals ===
Martin was signed by the Arizona Cardinals on August 4, 2020. He was released at roster cuts and signed to the practice squad the next day. He was signed to a future contract on January 5, 2021. He was released again on August 31 and subsequently signed to the practice squad. He was promoted to the active roster prior to a week three game against the Jacksonville Jaguars. Martin made his NFL debut on September 26, appearing on four special teams snaps during the 31–19 win. On October 4, 2021, Martin was released by the Cardinals and re-signed to the practice squad. He signed a reserve/future contract with the Cardinals on January 19, 2022.

On August 29, 2022, Martin was waived by the Cardinals. He was re-signed to the practice squad on September 14, 2022. He was released off the practice squad six days later. He was re-signed to the practice squad on October 5, 2022. He was released on January 4, 2023.

=== New Orleans Saints ===
On January 11, 2023, Martin signed a reserve/future contract with the New Orleans Saints. He was waived on July 25, 2023. On July 30, 2023, the Saints re-signed Martin to replace offensive lineman Trai Turner, after Turner sustained a season ending injury. He was waived/injured on August 9, 2023.

=== St. Louis Battlehawks ===
On December 11, 2023, Martin signed with the St. Louis Battlehawks of the XFL. He was waived on March 18, 2024.

== Personal life ==
His father Kirk played college football for the UTEP Miners and was an assistant coach while his son played for Syracuse. His mother Caren also was a sports player with UTEP. Koda Martin's father-in-law is former Syracuse head coach Dino Babers. Each of his three siblings also played college sports.
