= Iowa Colony High School =

Secondary school in Texas, United States

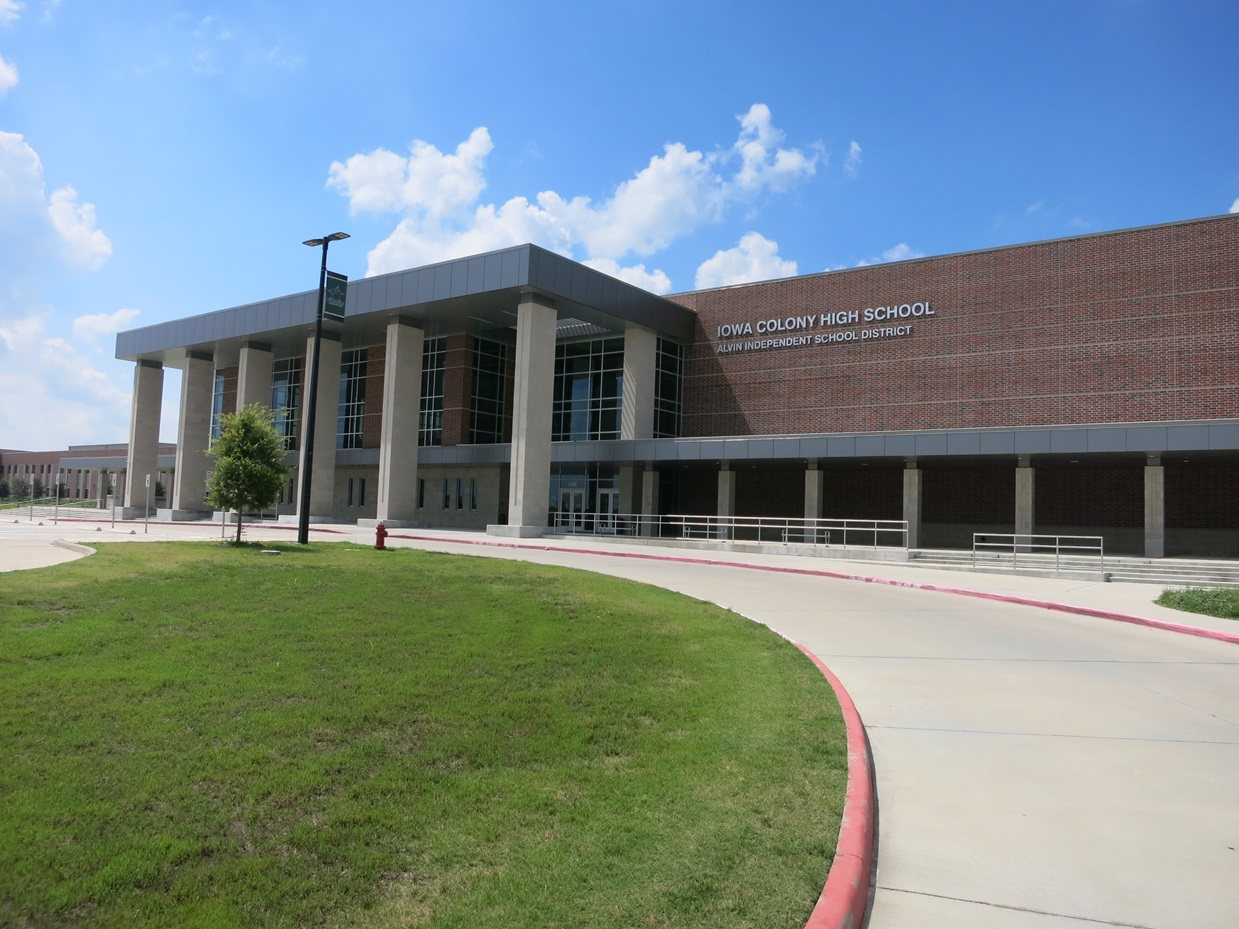

Location
- 3700 Davenport Parkway; Iowa Colony, Texas 77583; United States; 29.423203021799946°N 95.41934406024825°W

Information
- School type: Public, high school
- Established: 2022
- School district: Alvin Independent School District
- Faculty: 107.68 (on an FTE basis)
- Grades: 9–11
- Enrollment: 1,781 (2024-2025)
- Student to teacher ratio: 16.54
- Colors: Black, forest green and silver
- Mascot: Pioneers
- Website: www.alvinisd.net/o/ichs

Iowa Colony High School is a senior high school in Iowa Colony, Texas. It is a part of the Alvin Independent School District (AISD) and is within the Alvin ISD Heritage Complex. For the 2024-2025 school year, the school received an overall rating of "B" from the Texas Education Agency.

The school colors are black, hunter green, and silver. The mascot is Blaze the Ox, however the school body itself is represented by the title "Pioneers". It is adjacent to the 10,000-seat Alvin ISD facility Freedom Field.

The school serves almost all of Iowa Colony, and southern Manvel (portions of both places below Texas State Highway 6). Its boundary includes Meridiana.

== History ==
In 2018, Alvin ISD announced it would build another high school in Iowa Colony.

It was scheduled to open on August 17, 2022, with grades 9 and 10 at first; it will expand one more grade level per year until fall 2024. The expected initial enrollment was 800. Ashley Marquez was the initial principal. It will relieve Manvel High School.

There was a previous Iowa Colony High School, located on Brazoria County Road 48 (then Chocolate Bayou Road), in 1912. It closed around the time Iowa Colony's school district became a part of Alvin ISD.

== Campus ==
The designed capacity is 2,500 students.
