= D'Eriq King =

American football player and coach (born 1997)

SMU Mustangs
- Title: Co-offensive coordinator & quarterbacks coach

Personal information
- Born: August 24, 1997 (age 29); Manvel, Texas, U.S.
- Listed height: 5 ft 9 in (1.75 m)
- Listed weight: 195 lb (88 kg)

Career information
- High school: Manvel
- College: Houston (2016–2019); Miami (2020–2021)
- NFL draft: 2022: undrafted

Career history

Playing
- New England Patriots (2022)*; Carolina Panthers (2022)*; DC Defenders (2023)
- * Offseason or practice squad member only

Coaching
- SMU (2023–present); Offensive analyst (2023); Quarterbacks coach (2024–2025); Co-offensive coordinator & quarterbacks coach (2026–present)

Awards and highlights
- Second-team All-AAC (2018)
- Stats at Pro Football Reference

D'Eriq King (born August 24, 1997) is an American football coach and former quarterback who is the co-offensive coordinator and quarterbacks coach at Southern Methodist University. He played college football at the University of Houston before transferring to the University of Miami where he played quarterback.

== Early life ==
King attended Manvel High School in Manvel, Texas. He began his sophomore year as the eighth-string quarterback, claiming the starting spot a few weeks after the first game. During his senior season, he broke the career Texas 6A passing touchdowns record of 117 set by Kyler Murray the year before. During his high school career, he passed for over 10,000 yards and rushed for over 3,000, throwing for 140 touchdowns and rushing for 48. He originally committed to Texas Christian University (TCU) to play college football but changed to the University of Houston.

== College career ==
=== Houston ===
King entered his freshman year at Houston as a wide receiver after injuries plagued the receiving corps during fall camp. He played in 10 games and made four starts, recording 29 receptions for 228 yards and a touchdown.

He played quarterback and receiver as a sophomore in 2017. After leading a comeback win against South Florida, he took over as the starting quarterback for the final four games of the season. For the season, he completed 90 of 139 passes for 1,260 yards, seven touchdowns and two interceptions. He also added 379 rushing yards with eight touchdowns and had 29 receptions for 264 yards and two touchdowns as a receiver. King entered 2018 as Houston's starting quarterback.

His junior season was cut short when he suffered a non-contact knee injury in the eleventh game of the year. On the season, he passed for 2982 yards, 36 touchdowns and 6 interceptions. He also rushed for 14 touchdowns; Kyler Murray and Dwayne Haskins were the only quarterbacks with more total touchdowns that year.

King returned as starting quarterback for his senior season after recovering from the previous season's injury. However, after the team's first four games, King announced he was going to redshirt for the remainder of the 2019 season.

=== Miami ===
On January 20, 2020, King announced his transfer to the University of Miami.

On September 4, King threw for 179 yards and a touchdown in a 44–13 loss to No. 1 Alabama at Atlanta's Mercedes-Benz Stadium to open the 2021 season.

King was named Arthur Ashe Jr. Sports Scholar by Diverse: Issues In Higher Education.

=== NIL venture ===
On July 1, 2021, NCAA student-athletes were allowed to receive compensation for use of their name, image, and likeness (NIL) for the first time, and King was one of the first athletes to take advantage of the new rules, signing deals with College Hunks Hauling Junk and a few local businesses to the Miami area. He and Florida State quarterback McKenzie Milton became the co-founders and public faces of Dreamfield, a company specializing in booking live appearances for student-athletes. Dreamfield will also offer non-fungible tokens (NFTs), digital art works that cannot be duplicated and are purchased with cryptocurrency.

=== College statistics ===
Year	Team	GP	Passing								Rushing				Receiving			
Year	Team	GP	Cmp	Att	Pct	Yds	Avg	TD	Int	Rtg	Att	Yds	Avg	TD	Rec	Yds	Avg	TD
2016	Houston	9	2	3	66.7	20	6.7	1	0	232.7	15	56	3.7	0	29	228	7.9	1
2017	Houston	10	90	139	64.7	1,260	9.1	7	2	154.6	72	379	5.3	8	29	264	9.1	2
2018	Houston	11	219	345	63.5	2,982	8.6	36	6	167.0	111	674	6.1	14	1	12	12.0	0
2019	Houston (redshirt)	4	58	110	52.7	663	6.0	6	2	117.7	55	312	5.7	6	—	—	—	—
2020	Miami	11	211	329	64.1	2,686	8.2	23	5	152.7	130	538	4.1	4	2	16	8.0	0
2021	Miami	3	81	122	66.4	767	6.3	3	4	120.8	40	96	2.4	0	—	—	—	—
Career		48	661	1,048	63.1	8,378	8.0	76	19	150.5	423	2,055	4.9	32	61	520	8.5	3

== Professional career ==
Pre-draft measurables
Height	Weight	Arm length	Hand span	Wingspan	40-yard dash	10-yard split	20-yard split	Three-cone drill
5 ft 8 3/4 in (1.75 m)	196 lb (89 kg)	28 7/8 in (0.73 m)	9 1/4 in (0.23 m)	5 ft 11 1/8 in (1.81 m)	4.60 s	1.65 s	2.65 s	7.26 s
All values from NFL Combine/Pro Day

=== New England Patriots ===
King signed with the New England Patriots as an undrafted free agent on May 9, 2022. He was waived on May 16.

=== Carolina Panthers ===
On November 14, 2022, King was signed to the practice squad of the Carolina Panthers. King was expected to be assigned to the DC Defenders of the XFL on November 15 before the signing occurred. He was released on November 22.

=== DC Defenders ===
On December 12, 2022, King was assigned to the DC Defenders of the XFL after being released by the Panthers. King did not sign a Letter of Intent to return in 2024.

=== Professional statistics ===
Year	Team	League	Games		Passing								Rushing			
Year	Team	League	GP	GS	Cmp	Att	Pct	Yds	Y/A	TD	Int	Rtg	Att	Yds	Avg	TD
2023	DC	XFL	7	0	8	10	80.0	75	7.5	3	0	137.5	23	93	4.0	5

== Coaching career ==
On June 8, 2023, King was hired by Southern Methodist University to serve as an offensive analyst. On December 20, it was announced that King would be promoted to the position of quarterbacks coach.
