= Shadow Creek High School =

Public school in Texas, United States

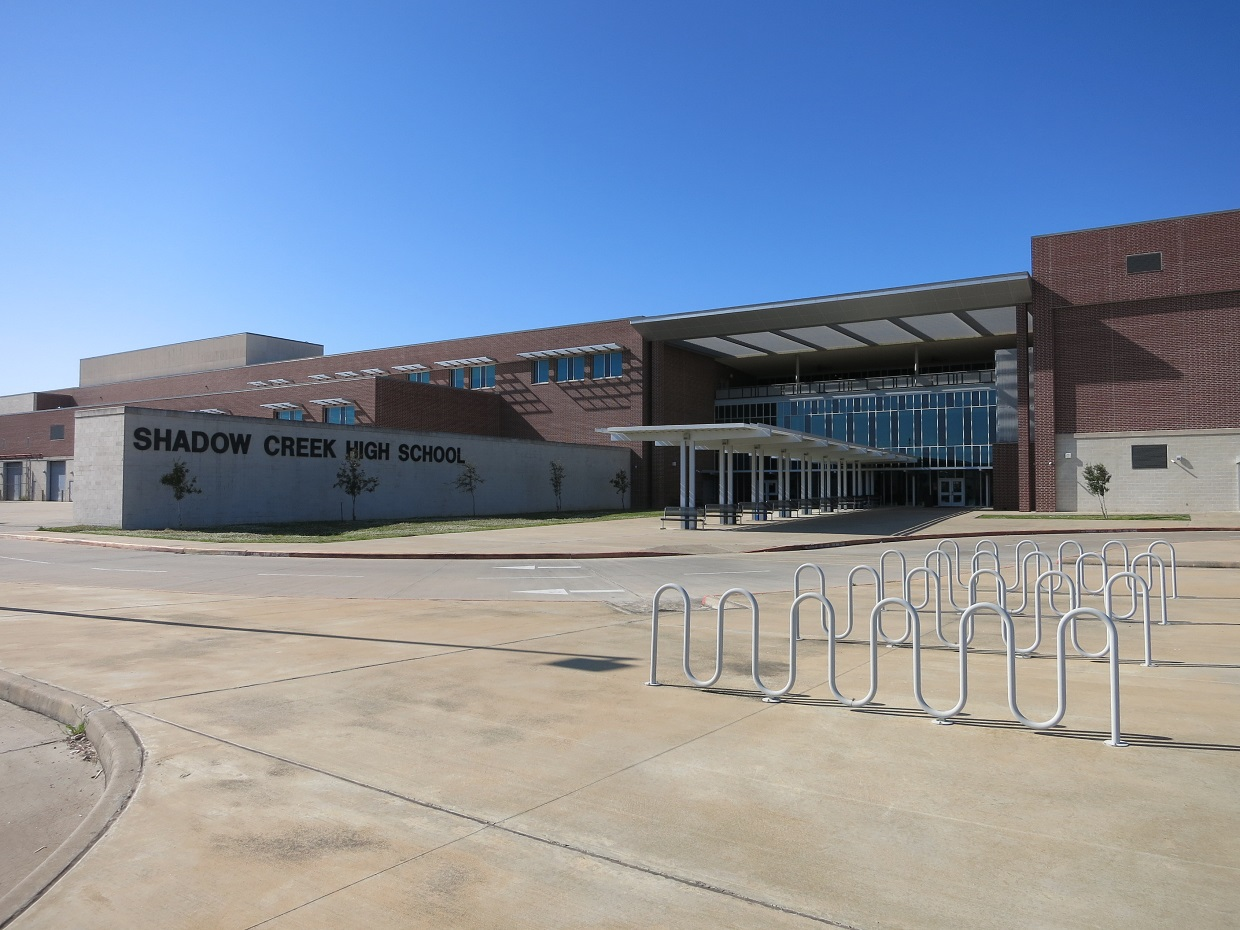

Location
- 11850 Broadway; Pearland, Brazoria County, Texas 77584; United States
- 29.5500°N 95.4039°W

Information
- School type: Public high school
- Motto: "Fins up Creek!"
- Established: 2016
- School district: Alvin Independent School District
- Superintendent: Carol Nelson
- Principal: Dr Tonya Patterson
- Teaching staff: 141.30 (FTE)
- Grades: 9-12
- Years offered: 2016-present
- Age range: 14-18
- Enrollment: 2,582 (2023-2024)
- Student to teacher ratio: 18.27
- Schedule: 7:20am - 2:50pm
- Colors: Blue, White & silver
- Athletics conference: UIL Class AAAAAA
- Mascot: Sharks
- Website: www.alvinisd.net/schs

Shadow Creek High School is a public high school in the Shadow Creek Ranch area of Pearland, Texas, in Greater Houston. A part of the Alvin Independent School District (AISD), SCHS was established in 2016. The mascot is the shark. For the 2024-2025 school year, the school received an overall rating of "A" from the Texas Education Agency.

The school was named after its location in Shadow Creek Ranch. It is on 72 acres (29 ha) of land; the three-story, 520,000-square-foot (48,000 m^{2}) structure is the district's third comprehensive high school.

Previously SCHS's boundary included a northeast portion of Manvel.

== History ==
It was originally known as "High School 3" but members of Alvin ISD's board of trustees approved the current name in February 2014. Gamma Construction built the facility; the scheduled beginning of construction was February 2014, and it was completed in August 2016.

== Fine Arts ==
The Shadow Creek High School Varsity Tenor-Bass Choir was one of eight high school choir ensembles that performed at the 2025 Texas Music Educators Association (TMEA) Clinic/Convention in San Antonio, Texas. Student leaders for the choir are Nicholas Vollman, Edwin Shibu, Luke Ramos, Kaleb Fulton, and James Williams. The choir is under the direction of Jennifer Gallagher and Frankie Espinoza.

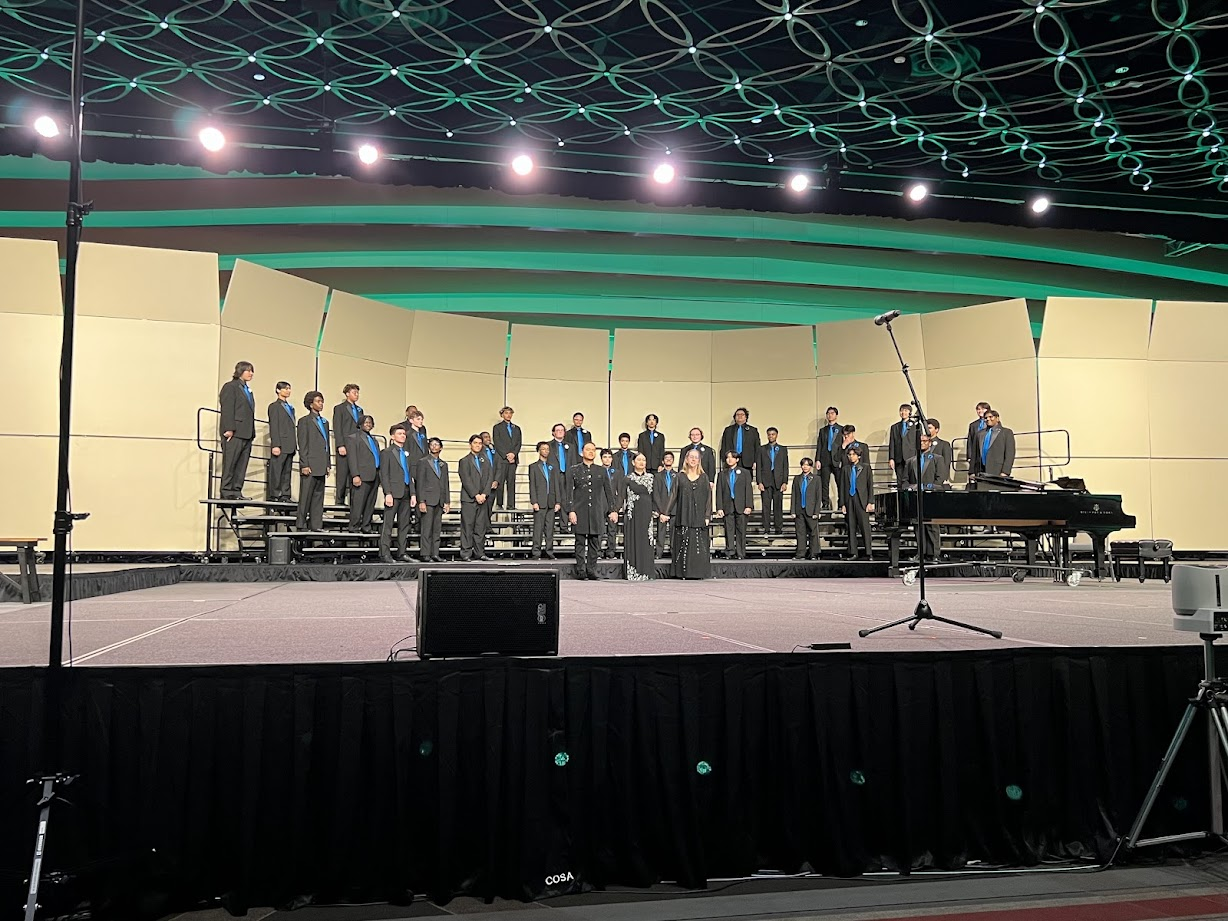
The Shadow Creek High School Varsity Tenor-Bass Choir onstage before their 2025 TMEA performance.

== Athletics ==
Shadow Creek High School has a developed athletics program including a total of 13 sports. The school is competitive on a district level. Notable Athletes include Kareem Ismail

- Football
  - 2018 State finalist (5A/D1)
  - 2019 State champion (5A/D1)

== Notable alumni ==
- Xavion Alford, college football safety for the Arizona State Sun Devils
- Kyron Drones, professional football player
