= Manvel, Texas =

City in Brazoria County, Texas, United States

- City
- Nickname: The Real Town & Country
- Motto: City on the Rise
- Location of Manvel, Texas
- Coordinates: 29°28′45″N 95°21′23″W
- Country: United States
- State: Texas
- County: Brazoria
- First established: 1877
- Incorporated: August 1960

Government
  - Type: Council-Manager
  - City Council: Mayor Dan Davis; Keith Bonner; David Lands (Mayor Pro Tempore); Harry Opliger; Carmyn Robey-Robinson; Jason Albert; Garrett Rossi Knox
  - City Manager: Dan Johnson

Area
  - Total: 27.50 sq mi (71.22 km^{2})
  - Land: 27.45 sq mi (71.09 km^{2})
  - Water: 0.050 sq mi (0.13 km^{2})
- Elevation: 52 ft (16 m)

Population (2020)
  - Total: 9,992
  - Estimate (2025): 20,699
  - Density: 461.6/sq mi (178.24/km^{2})
- Time zone: UTC-6 (Central (CST))
  - Summer (DST): UTC-5 (CDT)
- ZIP code: 77578
- Area code: 281
- FIPS code: 48-46500
- GNIS feature ID: 1340905
- Website: www.cityofmanvel.com

Manvel is a city in Brazoria County, Texas, United States. As of July 2025, the population was 20,699, up from 9,908 at the 2020 census.

== History ==
The W.R. Booth family first settled along Chocolate Bayou in 1857. In 1877, the Gulf, Colorado and Santa Fe Railroad started a rail line out of Galveston to Arcola, and soon after a settlement called Pamona was established. However, there was another town in west Texas with the same name, so the community changed the name to Manvel, honoring a man who later became the president of the Atchison, Topeka & Santa Fe Railroad. The railroad reached the area in 1879.

A townsite was developed in 1890. The Manvel Post Office was first established in Manvel on September 22, 1892, at which time William N. Pugh was appointed postmaster.

In August 1960, the City of Manvel incorporated with a population of 300.

The population increased from 9,908 to 17,621 from 2020 to 2023, and in November 2021 there were 12,000 lots in twelve housing complexes that were to be developed.

== Geography ==
Manvel is located in northern Brazoria County at 29°28′45″N 95°21′23″W (29.479200, –95.356299). Iowa Colony is to the west, Pearland is to the north, and Alvin is to the east.

According to the United States Census Bureau, the city has a total area of 23.6 square miles (61.0 km^{2}), of which 23.5 square miles (60.9 km^{2}) is land and 0.039 square miles (0.1 km^{2}), or 0.12%, is water.

Subdivisions within the City of Manvel consist of Rodeo Palms, Lakeland, Pomona, New Port Lake Estates, Meridianna, Del Bello Lakes, Bluewater Lakes, Terra Estates, Yanni Palms, Fox Tail, Sedona Lakes.

== Demographics ==
Historical population
Census	Pop.	Note	%±
1970	106		—
1980	3,549		3,248.1%
1990	3,733		5.2%
2000	3,046		−18.4%
2010	5,179		70.0%
2020	9,992		92.9%
2025 (est.)	20,699		107.2%
U.S. Decennial Census

=== 2020 census ===
As of the 2020 census, there were 9,992 people in Manvel, and the median age was 35.9 years; 27.5% of residents were under the age of 18 and 11.3% of residents were 65 years of age or older. For every 100 females there were 95.6 males, and for every 100 females age 18 and over there were 92.0 males age 18 and over.

There were 3,290 households in Manvel, of which 45.5% had children under the age of 18 living in them. Of all households, 60.6% were married-couple households, 13.6% were households with a male householder and no spouse or partner present, and 20.3% were households with a female householder and no spouse or partner present. About 14.5% of all households were made up of individuals and 4.9% had someone living alone who was 65 years of age or older.

There were 3,483 housing units, of which 5.5% were vacant. The homeowner vacancy rate was 2.2% and the rental vacancy rate was 6.2%.

49.6% of residents lived in urban areas, while 50.4% lived in rural areas.

Manvel racial composition as of 2020 (NH = Non-Hispanic) (Note: Note: the US Census treats Hispanic/Latino as an ethnic category. This table excludes Latinos from the racial categories and assigns them to a separate category. Hispanics/Latinos can be of any race.)
Race	Number	Percentage
White (NH)	4,256	42.6%
Black or African American (NH)	2,708	27.1%
Native American or Alaska Native (NH)	52	0.5%
Asian (NH)	740	7.4%
Native Hawaiian and Other Pacific Islander	5	0.1%
Some Other Race (NH)	864	8.6%
Mixed/Multi-Racial (NH)	1,367	13.7%
Hispanic or Latino (of any race)	2,525	25.3%
Total	9,992	

=== 2000 census ===
As of the census of 2000, Manvel had a population of 3,046, 1,085 households, and 870 families in the city. The population density was 130.7 inhabitants per square mile (50.5/km^{2}). There were 1,148 housing units at an average density of 49.3 per square mile (19.0/km^{2}). The racial makeup of the city was 65.7% White, 13.9% African American, 0.6% Native American, 8.6% Asian, 8.9% from other races, and 2.3% from two or more races. Hispanic or Latino of any race were 15.6% of the population.

Of the 1,085 households, 36.4% had children under the age of 18 living with them, 67.9% were married couples living together, 7.6% had a female householder with no husband present, and 19.8% were non-families. 15.5% of households were one person and 4.4% were one person aged 65 or older. The average household size was 2.80 and the average family size was 3.13.

The age distribution was 25.8% under the age of 18, 7.1% from 18 to 24, 29.9% from 25 to 44, 28.7% from 45 to 64, and 8.5% 65 or older. The median age was 38 years. For every 100 females, there were 100.7 males. For every 100 females age 18 and over, there were 111.3 males.

The median household income was $65,862 (increased to $99,081 as of July 2022), and the median family income was $79,217. Males had a median income of $45,602 versus $28,083 for females. The per capita income for the city was $23,751. About 1.3% of families and 3.0% of the population were below the poverty line, including 2.6% of those under age 18 and 1.9% of those age 65 or over.

== Government ==
Brazoria County operates the Manvel Substation in Manvel.

The city government is governed by an elected body consisting of one Mayor and six Council-members. All seven of the elected individuals have a vote based on the rules of the city drafted in its charter. The City transitioned in 2011 from a General Law city to a Home Rule City. This led to the establishment of the City Charter, City Master Plans, and the current governance structure. The City of Manvel takes a strong City manager form of government which is different from the City of Houston which is a strong Mayor form of government.

City Council meetings are held on the first and third Monday of every month and the Planning, Development, and Zoning Board meetings are held on the second and fourth meeting of every month. Other boards, commissions, and task-forces meet at various other dates throughout the month.

The City of Manvel has a current yearly general fund budget nearing $10 million, over 60 full-time employees, and the biggest department in the city being the Manvel Police Department. The current tax rate is .57 cents per $100 of valuation and there are more than 15 capital improvement projects being planned for.

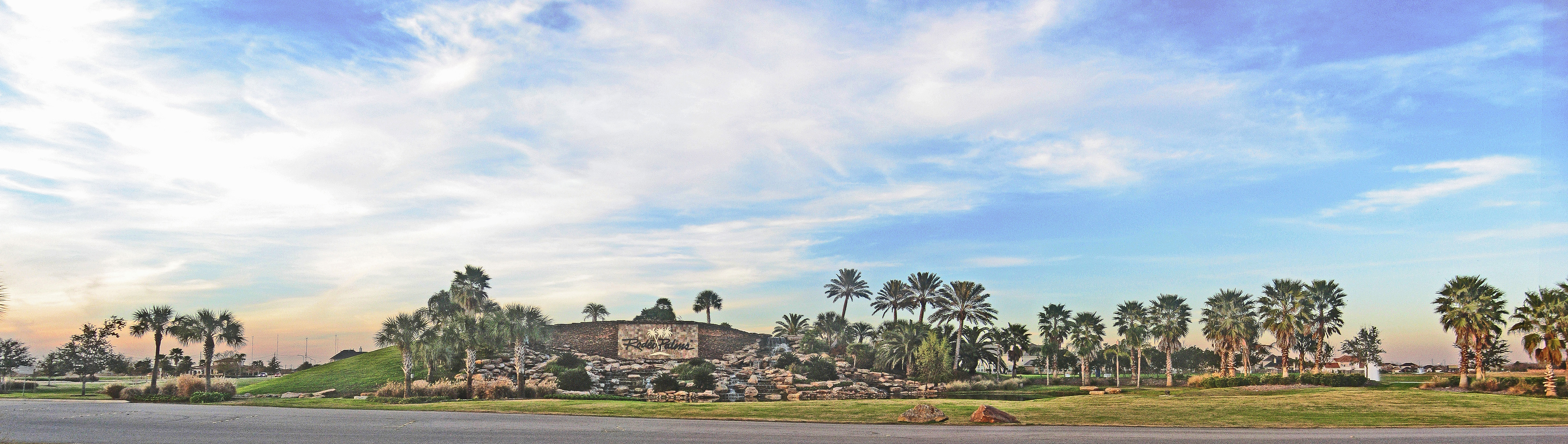
Rodeo Palms is a subdivision in Manvel

== Education ==
=== Primary and secondary schools ===
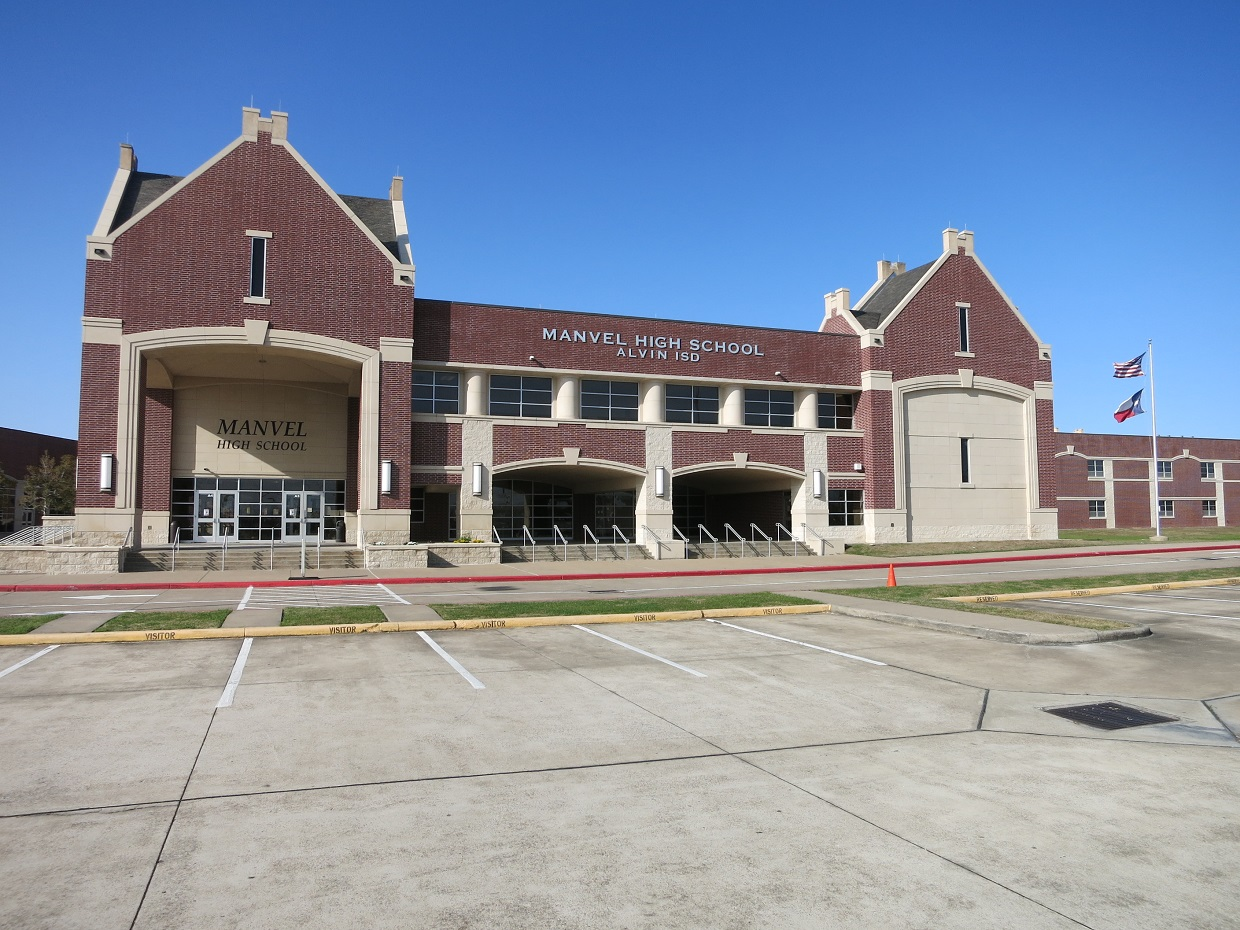
Manvel High School

==== Public schools ====
Students in Manvel attend schools in the Alvin Independent School District.

Elementary schools in Manvel and serving Manvel include:

- E.C. Mason Elementary School
- Don Jeter Elementary School
- Meridiana Elementary School in Iowa Colony
- Hood-Case Elementary School in Alvin
- Bel Sanchez Elementary School in Rosharon
- Pomona Elementary School

The following junior high schools serve Manvel: Manvel Junior High School, Rodeo Palms Junior High School, Caffey Junior High School, and Harby Junior High School (a small portion). Most areas north of Texas State Highway 6 are zoned to Manvel High School in Manvel while areas south of Highway 6 are zoned to Iowa Colony High School in Iowa Colony.

Manvel was served by Alvin High School (in the nearby city of Alvin), until 2006, when Manvel High opened. After Manvel High opened, the entire city was in the Manvel High zone. Beginning in 2016 Shadow Creek High School in Shadow Creek Ranch, Pearland served a portion of Manvel, but as of 2022 this is no longer the case.

With the passage of a local bond, several new schools, including an additional high school located in the neighboring city of Iowa Colony, will be constructed in coming years.

=== Colleges and universities ===
Manvel is served by the Alvin Community College system, with limited evening and weekend courses being offered at Manvel High School during the Fall and Spring terms. Manvel is in the ACC taxation zone.

Manvel is also within 25 miles (40 km) to several larger colleges including the University of Houston, Rice University, Texas A&M Galveston, University of St. Thomas, Houston Community College, Texas Southern University, Prairie View A&M University College Of Nursing, Baylor College of Medicine, University of Texas at Houston School of Medicine, University of Texas Medical Branch and Houston Baptist University.

=== Public libraries ===
The Manvel Library at 20514B Highway 6 is a part of the Brazoria County Library System.

== Transportation and Infrastructure ==
Texas State Highway 6 passes through the community, leading 7 miles (11 km) east to Alvin, 37 miles (60 km) east to Galveston, and 20 miles (32 km) northwest to Sugar Land. Texas State Highway 288, a four-lane freeway, runs through the northwest part of Manvel, leading north 20 miles (32 km) to downtown Houston and south 23 miles (37 km) to Angleton, the Brazoria County seat.

Manvel has no mapped railways running through it or within it.

Air travel in Manvel is convenient to access. General aviation can be utilized at the nearby Houston Southwest Airport along state highway 6, and Houston Hobby International Airport is rather close to the city, with a driving distance of about 17 miles on the quickest route. The larger but farther George Bush Intercontinental Airport is also accessible by utilizing state highway 288 and Interstate 69, and driving distance on such route is around 43 miles from the center of Manvel.

== Notable people ==
- Austin Bennett, former University of Oklahoma wide receiver
- D'Eriq King, University of Houston then University of Miami quarterback
- Koda Martin, Arizona Cardinals offensive lineman
- D'Vaughn Pennamon, Ole Miss tight end
- Jalen Preston, Texas A&M wide receiver
- Kyle Trask, Tampa Bay Buccaneers quarterback. Trask was selected with the 64th pick in the 2021 NFL draft
- Brianna Turner, Phoenix Mercury forward

== See also ==
- List of municipalities in Texas
