= Sheryl Searcy Ninth Grade Center =

Location
- 3775 South Main; Pearland, Texas 77584
- Coordinates: 29°32′26″N 95°16′18″W

Information
- School type: Public high school
- Motto: Where Ninth Comes First!
- Established: 2009
- Closed: 2013
- School district: Pearland Independent School District
- Staff: 80
- Grades: 9
- Language: English
- Colors: White, Black, and Maroon
- Mascot: Oiler
- Website: pearlandisd.org/SSearcy.cfm

Sheryl Searcy Ninth Grade Center is a state-operated secondary school in Pearland, Texas, United States.

== Description ==
SNGC, which served the ninth graders zoned to Pearland High School, was located in the north campus of the High School, and was part of the Pearland Independent School District.

Sheryl Searcy, who taught English at PHS, died in 2006 after almost two decades with the district. SNGC's mascot was the oiler rig, sharing it with Pearland High School.

The school colors were white, black, and maroon.

The school motto was: Where Ninth Comes First.

== History ==
In early 2009, the district's board of trustees approved the conversion of the PHS north campus into the Sheryl Searcy Ninth Grade Center. Beginning in fall 2009, the campus began to house freshmen zoned to PHS.

In April 2012, the district's board made the decision to merge SNGC back with Pearland High School effectively ending the ninth grade campus concept in PISD. When school began in August 2013, Pearland High School housed ninth through twelfth grades.
