= Pearland Stadium =

Multi-use stadium in Pearland, Texas

Pearland High School Stadium
- "The Rig" "The Nest"
- Interactive map of Pearland High School Stadium
- Location: Pearland, Texas, United States
- Coordinates: 29.538683°N 95.267193°W
- Owner: Pearland ISD
- Operator: Pearland ISD
- Capacity: 9,200
- Surface: FieldTurf

Construction
- Opened: 2001

Tenants
- Pearland High School Oilers; Houston Energy; Dawson High School Eagles

Pearland Stadium (nicknamed The Rig when Pearland is home and The Nest when Dawson is home) is an American multi-use stadium in Pearland, Texas (near Houston). The 12,000-capacity stadium is on the campus of Pearland High School and serves as home to the school's football, soccer, and track and field teams. It also serves as home to the Dawson High School Eagles football team.

In addition, it is home to the Houston Energy, a team in the Independent Women's Football League, who used to play at Houston's Astrodome stadium.

The stadium is nicknamed The Rig after oil rigs as oil is a large part of the Texas economy. It is also nicknamed The Nest after the Dawson Eagles.

== See also ==
- Architecture of Texas
- List of American football stadiums by capacity
- List of soccer stadiums in the United States
