= The Rig =

The Rig may refer to:

- A nickname for Pearland Stadium
- The Rig (TV series)
