= Robert Turner College and Career High School =

Public school in Texas, United States

Robert Turner High School and Career College
- 4717 Bailey Road; Pearland, Texas 77584; United States

Information
- Type: College and Career High School
- Established: July 2013
- School district: Pearland Independent School District
- Principal: Kai Bouchard
- Grades: 9-12
- Colors: Blue and Black
- Team name: Railcats. A Rail Cat is a resilient cat that lives in a rail yard. During the 1890s the town of Pearland was settled along the Gulf, Colorado, and Santa Fe rail line. With this in mind, the mascot options for Turner College & Career High School were based on railroad themes. In October, 2012 the community voted and selected the winning mascot, the Rail Cat.
- Website: tcchs.pearlandisd.org

Robert Turner College and Career High School is a public high school located in Pearland, Texas, United States. It is one of three high schools in the Pearland Independent School District. Turner offers the opportunity to get their high school degree and Associates degree in only 4 years. They offer Culinary School, Computer Science, Dentistry, and more. For the 2024-2025 school year, the school received a rating of "A" from the Texas Education Agency.

== Namesake ==
Mr. Robert Turner was the Pearland Independent School District Superintendent from 1968 - 1978. In February 2007, the school board voted to name the next high school campus Robert Turner High School. In March 2012, the school board voted to open a college & career high school. The school opened in August 2013.
