= Silverlake, Texas =

Planned community in Texas, US

Silverlake is a planned community in unincorporated Brazoria County, Texas, United States, near Pearland and in Greater Houston. The 1,000-acre (400 ha) community has 2,500 single-family houses and 230-acre (93 ha) of supporting commercial usage. It is partially within the extraterritorial jurisdiction of Manvel and partially within the extraterritorial jurisdiction of Pearland.

== History ==
The Southwyck housing development was located along Texas State Highway 288 in Brazoria County, that was built circa 1985. Johnson Development, a development company, said that it and Jefferson Development "recognized the potential" of the "nascent community" which "had floundered along with its developer despite an existing 29-acre lake, golf course and club."

Johnson Development opened the Silverlake community in April 1995. The modus operandi of the developers was that they found tracts of land near a major freeway that would put residents in a position to have quick commutes to their workplaces. In Silverlake's case, the developers marketed Silverlake as allowing a quick commute to Downtown Houston and the Texas Medical Center via Texas State Highway 288. Ralph Bivins of the Houston Chronicle said that housing sales in the Pearland area "were never really big until the 1990s."

Within 27 months of Silverlake's opening, Silverlake became the second highest selling housing development in the Houston area. Tom Wilcox, the general manager of Johnson Development, said in 2002 "We held that position for about three years, and we're still clipping along on the pace that keeps us in the No. 3 and 4 position." Bivins said in 2001 that Silverlake "helped turn the Texas 288 corridor and Pearland into a hotbed of new-home construction activity that is continuing today and spreading." In 2002 Bivins described Silverlake as the "biggest and most prolific" of the newly opened communities.

In 2005, 20 residents filed a lawsuit against the Silverlake Home Owners Association, demanding better representation and knowledge of how their home owners association dues are spent.

The plans called for there to be about 2,815 Single Family housing units, not including Multi Family Developments. By 2008 the City of Pearland was making plans to annex Brazoria County municipal utility districts 2 and 3, both within the extraterritorial jurisdiction of the City of Manvel.

== Government and infrastructure ==
The Brazoria County Sheriff's Office serves Silverlake. The county substation in Manvel, which serves the Silverlake area, opened on June 27, 2009. Residents in the area pressed the county to protect their neighborhoods after a series of home invasions took place in the beginning of 2009. In addition the death of Susana DeJesus, an assistant manager of a women's clothing store, prompted residents to demand for increased security. As a result, the substation opened.

The United States Postal Service operates the Silver Lake Post Office in Pearland, near Silverlake.

The United States military branches have recruiting offices in Silverlake . Army / Navy / Marines.

== Education ==
=== Colleges and universities ===
As a part of the Pearland Independent School District, Silverlake is also within the Alvin Community College district. Silverlake is 5 miles (8.0 km) from the main campus of Alvin Community College.

Silverlake is 10 miles (16 km) from San Jacinto College South, 15 miles (24 km) each from University of Houston and Texas Southern University, 17 miles (27 km) from the University of Houston–Clear Lake, 20 miles (32 km) from Rice University, and 23 miles (37 km) from the University of St. Thomas.

=== Primary and secondary schools ===
Silverlake is within the Pearland Independent School District.

Three elementary schools, Silvercrest, Silverlake, and Massey Ranch serve portions of Silverlake. Jamison Middle School and Rogers Middle School serve sections of Silverlake. Some residents are zoned to Berry Miller Junior High School, and some are zoned to Pearland Junior High South. All residents are zoned to Glenda Dawson High School.

In the mid-2000s Silverlake was served by Pearland Junior High East and Pearland High School.

In addition the Montessori School of Downtown operates the Silverlake Campus in Silverlake.

=== Public libraries ===
The Brazoria County Library System operates the Pearland Westside Library, located on 6,000 square feet (560 m^{2}) of space in an area at the intersection of Business Center Drive at Memorial Hermann Drive, behind the H-E-B.

== Parks and recreation ==
The community has a Private Clubhouse and a Private JR Olympic Swimming pool with Interactive Play Structure , as well as SilverLake Park, the Stonebridge Baseball Field, Stonebridge Park Soccer Field, A Private Sand Volleyball Court, A Private Splash Pad and 4 Private Tennis Courts.
