= Southern Trails =

Southern Trails is a 523-acre (212 ha) master planned community located west of State Highway 288 in Pearland, Texas, United States.

Developed by Ashton Woods, Newmark Homes, Taylor Morrison, Coventry Homes, and Perry Homes, the neighborhood includes a recreation center with a kitchen and fitness center, a junior Olympic pool, two kiddie pools, playgrounds, ten lakes, miles of hike & bike trails, and parks & picnic pavilions. 80 acres (320,000 m^{2}) of green space have been reserved for lakes and walking trails. Southern Trails is located close to the Texas Medical Center, Pearland Town Center, Downtown Houston, and Reliant Park. It is planned to have almost 1,400 home sites at full build-out.

== Architecture ==
Southern Trails' architectural style and community layout makes it distinct from many of the other planned communities in the surrounding area. As stated on its website: "The grand entrance heightens the sense of privacy and prestige. The architectural dynamics immediately impress, from the classic clubhouse, to the Arts & Crafts-style light standards that accent the roads, pathways and trails that meander throughout the community."

== Builders ==
As of February 2012, the current active builders are Ashton Woods Homes, Newmark Homes Houston, Taylor-Morrison, Coventry Homes, and Perry Homes. Ashton Woods, Coventry, and Perry Homes are the builders in main section of Southern Trails (east of Kingsley Drive). Taylor-Morrison and Newmark Homes are the builders in the Enclave at Southern Trails (west of Kingsley Drive).

The original builders in Southern Trails included David Weekley Homes, Trendmaker Homes, Imperial, and Trophy.

David Weekley built out all their existing lots by 2008, and then stopped operations in Southern Trails.

Trendmaker Homes built out all their existing lots by 2009, and then stopped operations in Southern Trails.

Imperial Homes filed for bankruptcy in the late summer of 2009. They stopped building in Southern Trails. Their existing lots were sold to Ashton Woods, Coventry, and Perry Homes.

Newmark Homes Houston was formed in the summer of 2009 after buying the Newmark brand name from TOUSA. TOUSA had been struggling in bankruptcy proceedings for several years, and in 2009 finally decided to close operations in Texas. Newmark Homes Houston is now a local Houston-area building company.

Trophy Homes had been a subsidiary of Newmark and was not bought when Newmark folded in Texas. As of 2010, Trophy is defunct and has no new startups in the Enclave section of Southern Trails.

In August, 2011, it was announced that the primary developer will be The Forestar Group. Forestar took over the role from Ashton Woods.

== Education ==
Southern Trails is within the Alvin Independent School District. Residents are zoned to the following schools:

- York and Brothers Elementary
- Ronald E. McNair Junior High
- Shadow Creek High School

In 2009, the Alvin Independent School District purchased a 70-acre (280,000 m^{2}) tract of land that borders Southern Trails between the Sage Meadows section and Kirby Drive. Alvin ISD has announced that a new high school will be built on the site. This construction startup will require a bond referendum to be passed by voters, so as of March 2010 there is no projected completion date for the high school.

Prior to 2014, Southern Trails was zoned to elementary schools located with Shadow Creek Ranch, namely Laura Ingalls Wilder Elementary and Glenn York Elementary. In the Fall of 2013, Alvin ISD proposed a rezoning all of Southern Trails to then under construction Red Duke Elementary. Many homeowners of Southern Trails protested this rezoning by obtaining over 500 signatures of the approximate 900 homes in Southern Trails. Nevertheless, the rezoning committee voted and accepted the proposal.

== Growth ==
Southern Trails has maintained steady growth, even during the economic recession. As of Feb, 2012, there are over 600 occupied homes in Southern Trails.

== Tax Rate ==
The 2011 property tax (combined) on homes in Southern Trails is $3.638131 for every $100 valuation. This includes tax for MUD district 34.

The 2012 property tax (combined) on homes in Southern Trails is $3.725816 for every $100 valuation. This includes tax for MUD district 34.

== Homeowners Association ==
The Southern Trails Residential Association, Inc. (RAI) is currently controlled by the developer, Forestar Group, which took over from Ashton Woods Homes in August, 2011. As of 2011, annual RAI dues are $825, except for the Garden Estates section, which is higher since their dues include lawn care. As of 2010, a one-time RAI assessment of $350 is required at closing. As of Dec. 1, 2011, the RAI is administered by Lone Star management company. Prior to that date, it was managed by Planned Community Management, Inc. (PCMI).

The Forestar Group is responsible for maintaining the infrastructure of the property in sections east of Kingsley Dr. (Southern Trails). Taylor-Morrison is responsible for maintaining the infrastructure of the property in sections west of Kingsley Dr. (The Enclave at Southern Trails).

== Neighborhood Watch ==
Southern Trails established a Neighborhood Watch program in March 2009. The program is officially sponsored by the city of Pearland Police Dept. Each month the Neighborhood Watch volunteers have a monthly meeting that is open to all residents.
