= Hastings, Pearland, Texas =

Area of Pearland, Texas, US

Hastings is an area in Pearland, Texas, United States that was formerly a distinct unincorporated area in Brazoria County. Alvin Independent School District operates schools in the area. The community is funded by Hastings Oilfield.
