= Derek Parish =

American gridiron football player (born 1999)

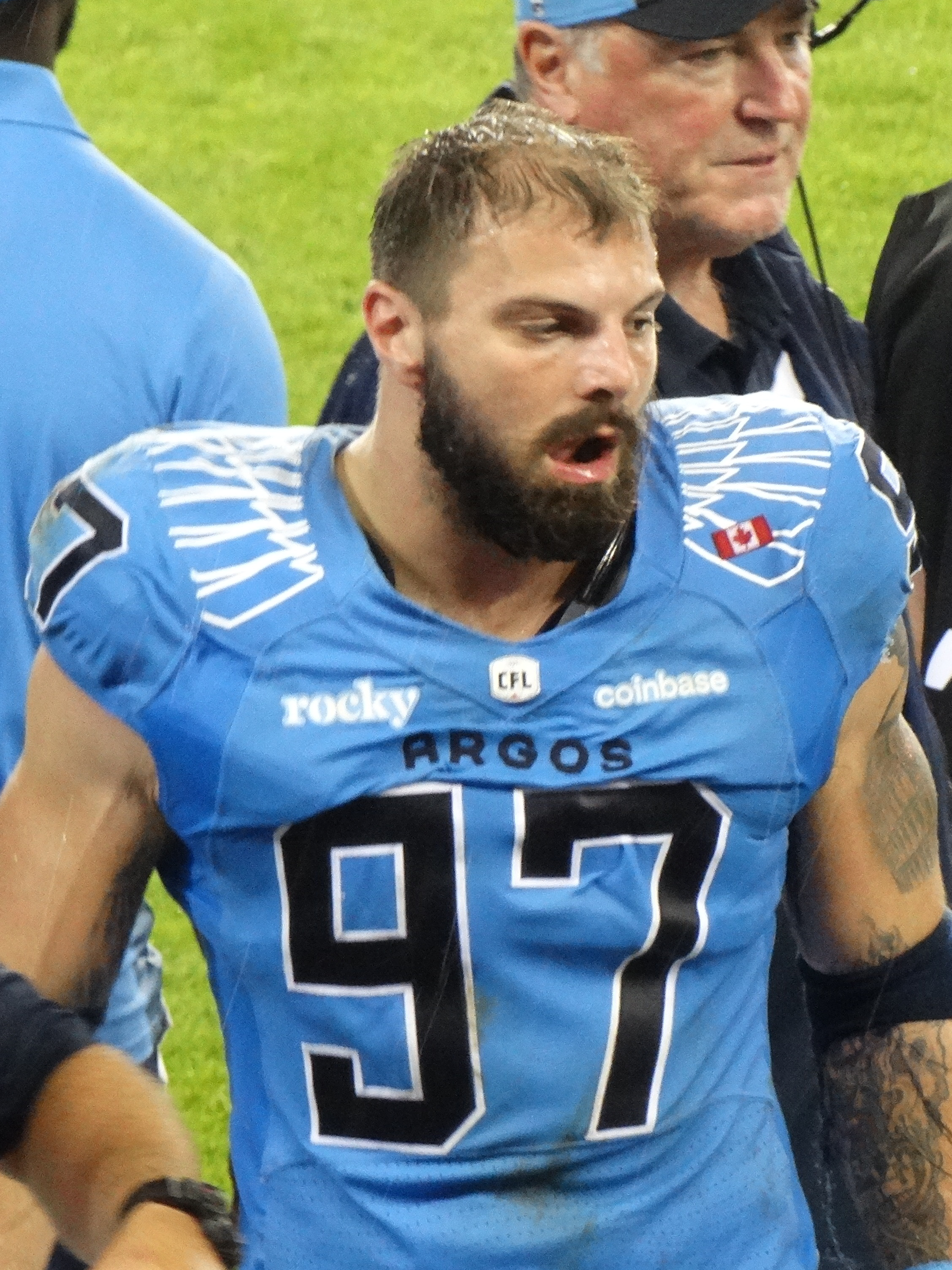
- Parish with the Toronto Argonauts in 2025

Profile
- Position: Defensive end

Personal information
- Born: January 4, 1999 (age 27); Pearland, Texas, U.S.
- Listed height: 6 ft 1 in (1.85 m)
- Listed weight: 241 lb (109 kg)

Career information
- High school: Pearland
- College: Houston (2017–2022)
- NFL draft: 2023: 7th round, 240th overall pick

Career history
- Jacksonville Jaguars (2023)*; Toronto Argonauts (2024–2025); DC Defenders (2026); Houston Texans (2026)*
- * Offseason or practice squad member only

Awards and highlights
- Grey Cup champion (2024); Second-team All-AAC (2021)
- Stats at Pro Football Reference

Derek Parish (born January 4, 1999) is an American professional football defensive lineman. He played college football at Houston as an edge rusher and fullback. Parish was selected by the Jacksonville Jaguars in the seventh round of the 2023 NFL draft. He previously played for the DC Defenders of the United Football League (UFL) and Toronto Argonauts of the Canadian Football League (CFL). He also played for the Houston Texans.

== Early life ==
Parish was born on January 4, 1999, and grew up in Pearland, Texas. He attended Pearland High School and played football while also running track. Despite being named first-team all-district after posting 12.0 sacks in 2016, Parish was not highly recruited, not even placing on Rivals.com's and ESPN's rankings and being a three-star prospect. He committed to play college football for the Houston Cougars.

== College career ==
As a true freshman at Houston in 2017, Parish redshirted. Although recruited as a linebacker, his position was quickly changed to defensive end. He appeared in all 13 games the following year, totaling 21 tackles. He played 12 games in 2019, starting four while posting 38 tackles, 5.5 tackles-for-loss and 2.0 sacks. In the COVID-19-shortened 2020 season, Parish played in all eight games, five of which he started, and tallied 25 tackles, 5.5 tackles-for-loss, and 3.5 sacks, the latter two statistics ranking third on the team. Against South Florida that year, he returned a fumble 85 yards for a touchdown.

In 2021, Parish started all 14 games and was named second-team All-American Athletic Conference (AAC) after recording 56 tackles, 12.5 tackles-for-loss and 5.5 sacks. At the start of 2022, he underwent hip surgery and later surgery for a broken bone on his hand, the latter requiring him to play with a club on his hand. He was named team captain and in the second game of the 2022 season, against Texas Tech, Parish set the AAC record with 4½ sacks, additionally posting 6.5 tackles-for-loss and a forced fumble, afterwards being named the national defensive player of the week. However, he then suffered a season-ending torn bicep injury in the fourth game of the year. He had posted 20 tackles, 5.0 sacks and 8.5 tackles-for-loss through that point of the season, ranking third-best nationally in the latter two. Parish was able to return in time to play in the East–West Shrine Bowl, at which he changed his position from defensive end to fullback.

== Professional career ==
Pre-draft measurables
Height	Weight	Arm length	Hand span	Wingspan	40-yard dash	10-yard split	20-yard split	20-yard shuttle	Three-cone drill	Vertical jump	Broad jump	Bench press
6 ft 0 7/8 in (1.85 m)	241 lb (109 kg)	29 1/4 in (0.74 m)	9 1/2 in (0.24 m)	6 ft 1 5/8 in (1.87 m)	4.62 s	1.60 s	2.60 s	4.07 s	6.76 s	37 in (0.94 m)	9 ft 10 in (3.00 m)	27 reps
All values from Houston Pro Day

=== Jacksonville Jaguars ===
Parish was selected by the Jacksonville Jaguars in the seventh round (240th overall) of the 2023 NFL draft. He was waived by Jacksonville on August 29, 2023 and was subsequently re-signed to the practice squad. Parish was released by the Jaguars on October 16.

=== Toronto Argonauts ===
On January 22, 2024, it was announced that Parish had signed with the Toronto Argonauts as a defensive lineman. In the 2024 season, Parish played in all 18 regular season games, starting in five, where he had 21 defensive tackles, five special teams tackles, six sacks, and two pass knockdowns. He also played in all three post-season games, including the 111th Grey Cup where he didn't record a statistic, but shared in the Argonauts' 41–24 victory over the Winnipeg Blue Bombers.

In 2025, Parish played and started in 16 regular season games where he had 32 defensive tackles, five sacks, and one forced fumble. On January 26, 2026, it was announced that he had been released by the Argonauts.

=== DC Defenders ===
On February 1, 2026, Parish signed with the DC Defenders of the United Football League (UFL).

=== Houston Texans ===
On August 25, 2026, Parish signed with the Houston Texans. Parish was released by the Texans as a part of final roster cuts on August 30.

== Personal life ==
Parish won an eating competition between his Cougars teammates by eating 7 lbs. (3.175 kg) of steak in one sitting.
