= Joirdon Nicholas =

American basketball player (born 1999)

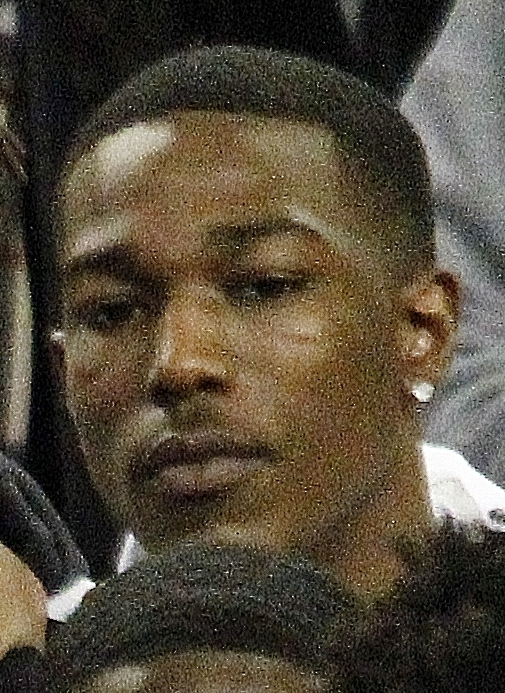
- Nicholas in 2020

No. 5 – Maccabi Ashdod
- Position: Power forward / center
- League: Israeli Basketball Premier League

Personal information
- Born: March 29, 1999 (age 27) Pearland, Texas, U.S.
- Listed height: 6 ft 9 in (2.06 m)
- Listed weight: 220 lb (100 kg)

Career information
- High school: Glenda Dawson (Pearland, Texas)
- College: Montana (2017–2018); Stephen F. Austin (2018–2019); Texas Southern (2020–2023)
- NBA draft: 2023: undrafted
- Playing career: 2023–present

Career history
- 2023–2024: South Bay Lakers
- 2024: Tijuana Zonkeys
- 2024: College Park Skyhawks
- 2024–2025: Cleveland Charge
- 2025: South Bay Lakers
- 2025–2026: Scarborough Shooting Stars
- 2026: Maccabi Ironi Ramat Gan
- 2026: Promitheas Patras
- 2026–present: Maccabi Ashdod

Career highlights
- Second-team All-SWAC (2023); HBCU All-Star (2023); SWAC All-Tournament Team (2021)
- Stats at NBA.com
- Stats at Basketball Reference

Joirdon Karl Nicholas (born March 29, 1999) is an American-Jamaican professional basketball player for Maccabi Ashdod of the Israeli Basketball Premier League.

He played college basketball for the Montana Grizzlies, Stephen F. Austin Lumberjacks, and Texas Southern Tigers. Nicholas began his professional career in the NBA G League, playing for the South Bay Lakers, College Park Skyhawks, and Cleveland Charge. He has also played internationally in Mexico, Canada, Greece, and Israel.

== High school career ==
Nicholas attended Glenda Dawson High School in his native Pearland, Texas, helping the Eagles to a 27–8 mark in his senior season, which included a 11–1 record in league play while being named the 2016–17 Texas District 22–6A MVP and being rated as the 17th-best prospect in the state.

== College career ==
=== Montana ===
Nicholas began his college career with Montana, with whom he played 30 games during the 2017–18 season, averaging 9.6 minutes, 3.5 points, and 2.3 rebounds per game while shooting 60.3% from the field and helping the Grizzlies win the Big Sky Conference championship.

=== Stephen F. Austin ===
Following his freshman year, he transferred to Stephen F. Austin, playing in 13 games (six starts) in 2018–19 and averaging 17.9 minutes, 7.8 points, 4.2 rebounds, and 1.3 blocks per game.

=== Texas Southern ===
Nicholas then transferred to Texas Southern, sitting out the 2019–20 season as a redshirt due to NCAA transfer rules. Over three active seasons with the Tigers (2020–23), he helped Texas Southern capture three consecutive SWAC Tournament championships.

As a redshirt junior in 2020–21, he averaged 23.4 minutes, 10.9 points, and 6.8 rebounds per game while shooting 54.6% from the floor, earning All-SWAC Tournament Team honors after recording 16 points and 12 rebounds in the title game against Prairie View A&M. In 2021–22, he averaged 20.7 minutes, 9.0 points, and 6.1 rebounds across 32 games on 55.1% shooting from the field.

As a fifth-year senior in 2022–23, Nicholas earned Second-Team All-SWAC honors while averaging 27.6 minutes, 10.7 points, a conference-leading 8.9 rebounds, and 1.5 assists per game while shooting 53.1% from the floor.

== Professional career ==
=== South Bay Lakers (2023–2024) ===
After going undrafted in the 2023 NBA draft, Nicholas joined the South Bay Lakers on October 28, 2023, after a successful tryout. In 39 combined games, he averaged 19.0 minutes, 8.2 points, 5.8 rebounds, and 1.3 assists per game while shooting 55.6% from the floor. He also played in 13 Showcase Cup games during the 2023–24 season, averaging 17.4 minutes, 8.8 points, 5.5 rebounds, and 1.0 assist per game while shooting 67.1% from the field.

=== Tijuana Zonkeys (2024) ===
In May 2024, Nicholas signed with the Tijuana Zonkeys of the Circuito de Baloncesto de la Costa del Pacífico. In 19 games, he averaged 19.7 minutes, 10.0 points, 6.2 rebounds, and 1.8 assists per game, helping the team reach the semifinal.

=== College Park Skyhawks (2024) ===
After joining the Los Angeles Lakers for the 2024 NBA Summer League, Nicholas signed with the Atlanta Hawks on September 26, 2024, but was waived the next day. On October 26, he joined the College Park Skyhawks and in six games averaged 12.2 minutes, 4.5 points, and 3.5 rebounds per game while shooting 50.0% from the floor and 50.0% from three-point range.

=== Cleveland Charge (2024–2025) ===
On December 5, 2024, Nicholas was traded to the Cleveland Charge. In 15 combined games (four starts), he averaged 11.8 minutes, 4.8 points, and 2.6 rebounds per game while shooting 50.9% from the floor, before he was waived on February 10, 2025.

=== Return to South Bay (2025) ===
On February 12, 2025, Nicholas signed with the South Bay Lakers after being acquired from the Player Pool. On February 12, 2025, Nicholas signed with the South Bay Lakers after he was acquired from the Player Pool. In nine games, he averaged 12.9 minutes, 8.3 points, 4.9 rebounds, and 0.9 assists per game while shooting 54.2% from the floor.

=== Scarborough Shooting Stars (2025) ===
On May 7, 2025, Nicholas signed with the Scarborough Shooting Stars of the Canadian Elite Basketball League (CEBL). In 18 games during the 2025 CEBL season, he averaged 16.8 minutes, 8.2 points, 5.4 rebounds, 1.3 assists, and 1.0 steals per game, while shooting 53.6% from the floor and 50.0% from three-point range, finishing 4th among CEBL power forwards in total blocks (14).

=== Ironi Ramat Gan (2025–2026) ===
On August 22, 2025, Nicholas signed with Ironi Ramat Gan of the Israeli Basketball Premier League. In 16 regular-season games in 2025–26, he averaged 25.7 minutes, 12.8 points, and 9.4 rebounds per game while shooting 57.2% from the floor, ranking 4th overall in the Israeli Basketball Premier League in rebounding (and 2nd among centers) as well as 4th among centers in scoring. In five Winner Cup games, he also averaged 27.4 minutes, 12.4 points, and 12.8 rebounds per game on 55.3% shooting from the floor.

=== Promitheas Patras (2026) ===
On June 9, 2026, Nicholas signed with Promitheas Patras of the Greek Basketball League (GBL). He played in three Basketball Champions League qualification games for Promitheas, averaging 15.7 minutes, 9.7 points, and 5.3 rebounds per game while shooting 70.6% from the floor before leaving the club in November 2026.

=== Maccabi Ashdod (2026–present) ===
On November 13, 2026, Nicholas returned to Israel, signing with Maccabi Ashdod of the Israeli Basketball Premier League.

== Personal ==
Nicholas holds dual American and Jamaican citizenship.
