= Fozzy Whittaker =

American football player (born 1989)

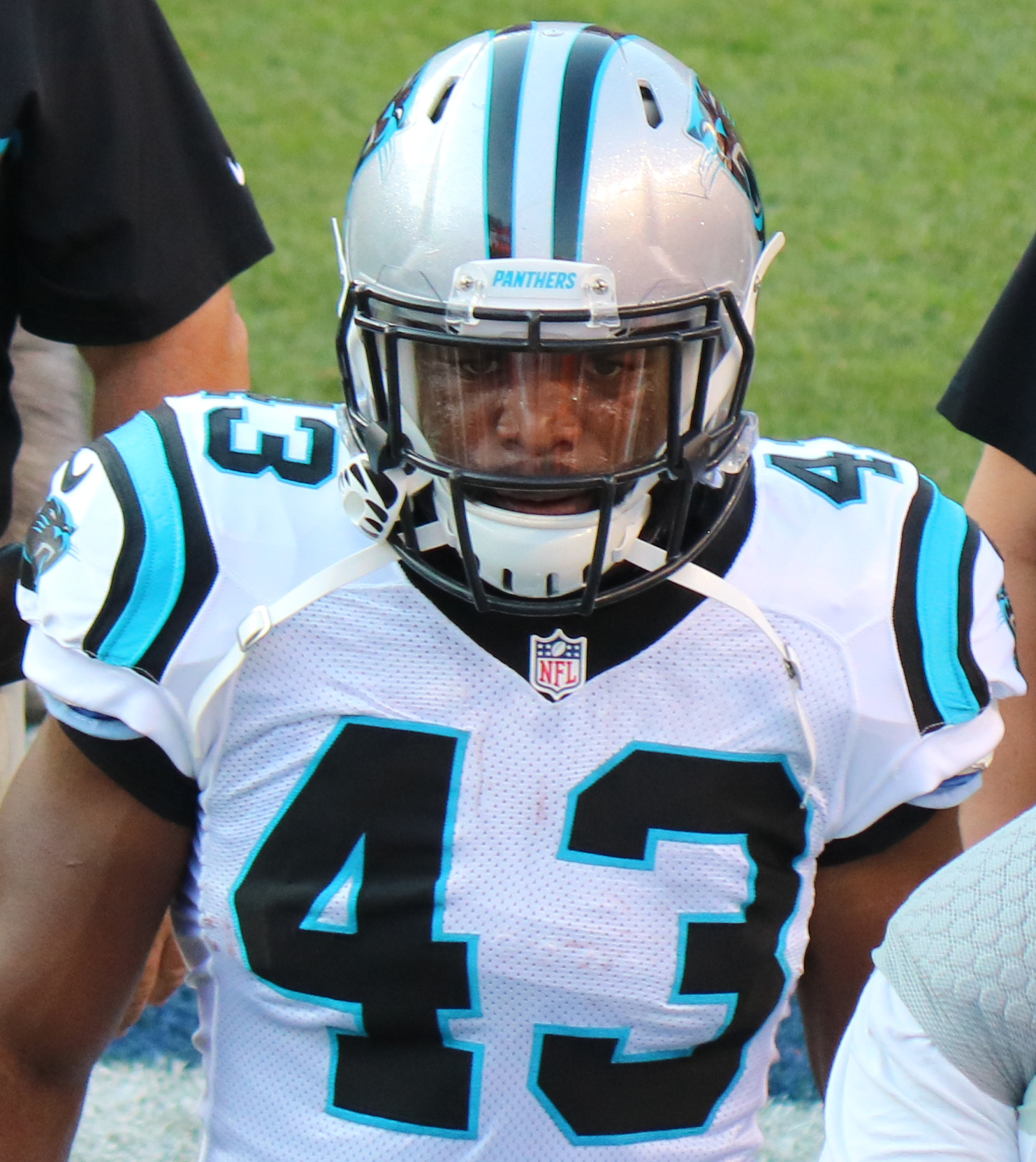
- Whittaker with the Carolina Panthers in 2016

No. 34, 35, 43
- Positions: Running back, kick returner

Personal information
- Born: February 2, 1989 (age 37); Houston, Texas, U.S.
- Listed height: 5 ft 10 in (1.78 m)
- Listed weight: 205 lb (93 kg)

Career information
- High school: Pearland (Pearland, Texas)
- College: Texas (2007–2011)
- NFL draft: 2012: undrafted

Career history
- Arizona Cardinals (2012)*; San Diego Chargers (2013); Cleveland Browns (2013); Carolina Panthers (2014–2018)
- * Offseason or practice squad member only

Awards and highlights
- First-team All-Big 12 (2011)

Career NFL statistics
- Rushing yards: 615
- Rushing average: 4.1
- Rushing touchdowns: 2
- Receptions: 68
- Receiving yards: 552
- Receiving touchdowns: 4
- Return yards: 1494
- Stats at Pro Football Reference

Foswhitt Jer'ald "Fozzy" Whittaker (born February 2, 1989) is an American former professional football player. He is a college football color analyst.

Whittaker was a running back and kick returner for six seasons in the National Football League (NFL). Whittaker entered the NFL as an undrafted free agent in 2012 with the Arizona Cardinals and spent his rookie year as a member of the Cardinals' practice squad. Whittaker spent the 2013 season on the rosters of the Cleveland Browns and San Diego Chargers. Whittaker signed with the Carolina Panthers during the 2014 off-season and played with the Panthers from 2014 to 2018. He played in one Super Bowl during his time with the Panthers in Super Bowl 50 during the 2015 NFL season. He played college football for the Texas Longhorns, where he was a 2011 first-team All-Big 12 selection, in the special teams as a kick returner, and was named an honorable mention for the 2011 All-Big 12 Special Teams Player of the Year. He also played in the 2010 BCS National Championship Game. He was a member of the Texas track and field team, and participated in the 2010 Big 12 Track and Field Championship.

== Early life, family and education ==
Whittaker was raised by parents Foster Jer'ald Whittaker and Gloria Whittaker. His father died from lymphoma in 1992.

Whittaker attended and played high school football at Pearland High School, leading them to the state semi final game. He finished high school as the sixth all-time rusher in Texas 5A history (5,717 yards) and a prep All-American.

He attended the University of Texas from 2008 to 2011.

== College athletic career ==
Whittaker played college football at the University of Texas from 2008 to 2011.

In the 2008 season, he had 64 carries for 284 rushing yards in seven games. He also had 6 carries for 23 yards in the 2009 Fiesta Bowl victory for Texas.

In the 2009 season, he had 53 carries for 212 rushing yards and four rushing touchdowns in 11 games. The Longhorns won the Big 12 championship that year and went to the 2010 BCS National Championship Game, where Whittaker had 1 carry for 5 yards.

In the 2010 season, he had 80 carries for 351 rushing yards and four rushing touchdowns. In the 2011 season, he had 66 carries for 386 rushing yards and six rushing touchdowns. In November he was injured and missed the rest of the season, including the Holiday Bowl, which the Longhorns won.

Whittaker was a three-time first-team Academic All-Big 12 selection. In 2011, he was a first-team All-Big 12 selection as chosen by the coaches, and an honorable mention, as chosen by the AP, as a kick returner. He was also an honorable mention for Big 12 Special Teams Player of the Year.

He holds several school records for kickoff returns, including: the most career touchdowns (2; tied), the longest kickoff return (100 yards, twice), most yards in a single game (252 vs. Oklahoma State in 2011), and highest average per return in a single game (42.0 vs. Oklahoma State in 2011).

He was also on the track team, and ran the opening leg of the 4x100-meter relay for Texas at the 2010 Big 12 Championships.

== Professional athletic career ==
Pre-draft measurables
Height	Weight	Arm length	Hand span	Bench press
5 ft 9 in (1.75 m)	193 lb (88 kg)	30 3/4 in (0.78 m)	9 1/4 in (0.23 m)	20 reps
All values from NFL Combine

=== Arizona Cardinals ===
On December 18, 2012, Whittaker signed with the Arizona Cardinals to join their practice squad. On March 11, 2013, he was released by the Cardinals.

=== San Diego Chargers ===
On March 12, 2013, Whittaker was claimed off waivers by the San Diego Chargers. He made his NFL debut on September 9, 2013, against the Houston Texans. He played in three total games with the Chargers in the 2013 season. On September 28, he was released by the Chargers.

=== Cleveland Browns ===
On September 30, 2013, Whittaker was claimed off waivers by the Cleveland Browns. On October 27, against the Kansas City Chiefs, he scored his first professional touchdown.

While he played for the Chargers and Browns in the 2013 season, he had 28 carries for 79 rushing yards to go along with 21 receptions for 155 receiving yards and two receiving touchdowns.

On May 12, 2014, Whittaker was released by the Browns.

=== Carolina Panthers ===
On July 27, 2014, Whittaker was signed by the Carolina Panthers after an injury to Panthers rookie running back Tyler Gaffney that occurred the previous day. After a strong preseason showing, he made the initial 53-man roster, announced on August 30.

In the 2014 regular season, he finished with 32 carries for 145 rushing yards and a rushing touchdown to go along with five receptions for 60 receiving yards and a receiving touchdown.

On January 3, 2015, in the Wild Card Round of the playoffs, Whittaker scored a crucial 39-yard, go-ahead receiving touchdown in the third quarter against the Arizona Cardinals, helping the Panthers to a 27–16 victory, which enabled them to advance to the Divisional Round of the playoffs. However, the Panthers' season ended in a 31–17 loss to the Seattle Seahawks.

In Whittaker's second year with the team, he had 108 rushing yards and a rushing touchdown, as the Panthers finished the season with a franchise-record 15 wins. In the 2015 playoffs, they defeated the Seattle Seahawks in the Divisional Round and the Arizona Cardinals in the NFC Championship. On February 7, 2016, Whittaker was part of the Panthers team that played in Super Bowl 50 against the Denver Broncos. In that game, Whittaker had four carries for 26 yards, one catch for 14 yards, and two tackles on special teams. However, the Panthers fell to the Broncos by a score of 24–10.

In the 2016 season, Whittaker would appear in all 16 regular season games. He had 57 carries for 265 yards and 25 receptions for 226 yards.

On September 18, 2016, Whittaker ran for 100 yards on 16 carries against the San Francisco 49ers when Jonathan Stewart left in the first quarter with a hamstring injury. On October 2, he caught nine passes for 86 yards against the Atlanta Falcons.

On March 8, 2017, Whittaker signed a two-year contract extension. In the 2017 season, he finished with seven carries for 18 rushing yards to go along with five receptions for 47 receiving yards and a receiving touchdown.

On May 10, 2018, Whittaker suffered a torn ACL during a non-contact drill in the off-season. As a result, he was placed on injured reserve and ruled out for the entire 2018 season.

In March 2019, his contract expired and he became a free agent. On May 23, 2019, it was reported he had a workout with the New Orleans Saints, and in September he had a workout with the Giants, but he was signed by neither team.

== Analyst ==
Following his playing career, Whitaker worked as an analyst for the Longhorn Network and Big 12 Radio from 2018 to 2023. With the end of the Longhorn Network, he moved to ESPN in 2024.

== Personal life ==
Whittaker performed in Ballet Austin’s annual production of The Nutcracker.
