= Brookside Village, Texas =

City in Brazoria County, Texas, United States

City of Brookside Village
- City
- Brookside Village, Texas
- Interactive map of City of Brookside Village
- Coordinates: 29°35′27″N 95°19′05″W
- Country: United States
- State: Texas
- County: Brazoria
- City: December 28, 1959

Government
  - Type: General Law Type A

Area
  - Total: 2.07 sq mi (5.35 km^{2})
  - Land: 2.07 sq mi (5.35 km^{2})
  - Water: 0 sq mi (0.00 km^{2})
- Elevation: 46 ft (14 m)

Population (2020)
  - Total: 1,548
  - Density: 749/sq mi (289/km^{2})
- Time zone: UTC-6 (Central (CST))
  - Summer (DST): UTC-5 (CDT)
- ZIP code: 77581
- Area code: 281
- FIPS code: 48-10648
- GNIS feature ID: 2409918
- Website: brooksidevillage-tx.org

Brookside Village is a city in Brazoria County, Texas, United States. The population of the city was 1,548 at the 2020 U.S. census, an increase over the figure of 1,523 tabulated in the 2010 U.S. census. The city of Brookside Village is part of the Houston–Pasadena–The Woodlands metropolitan statistical area.

== Geography ==
Brookside Village is located along the northern border of Brazoria County. It is bordered by the city of Pearland on the east, south, and west. To the north, in Harris County, is the city of Houston. According to the United States Census Bureau, the city has a total area of 2.1 square miles (5.4 km^{2}), all land.

== Demographics ==
Historical population
Census	Pop.	Note	%±
1960	560		—
1970	1,507		169.1%
1980	1,453		−3.6%
1990	1,470		1.2%
2000	1,960		33.3%
2010	1,523		−22.3%
2020	1,548		1.6%
U.S. Decennial Census

=== 2020 census ===
As of the 2020 census, there were 1,548 people, 524 households, and 387 families residing in Brookside Village. The median age was 41.1 years; 23.6% of residents were under the age of 18 and 17.4% of residents were 65 years of age or older. For every 100 females there were 104.5 males, and for every 100 females age 18 and over there were 101.4 males age 18 and over.

Racial composition as of the 2020 census
Race	Percent
White	56.8%
Black or African American	6.8%
American Indian and Alaska Native	0.6%
Asian	1.7%
Native Hawaiian and Other Pacific Islander	0%
Some other race	15.4%
Two or more races	18.5%
Hispanic or Latino (of any race)	49.1%

There were 524 households in Brookside Village, of which 38.9% had children under the age of 18 living in them. Of all households, 61.6% were married-couple households, 13.9% were households with a male householder and no spouse or partner present, and 20.0% were households with a female householder and no spouse or partner present. About 14.7% of all households were made up of individuals and 6.7% had someone living alone who was 65 years of age or older.

There were 579 housing units, of which 9.5% were vacant. Among occupied housing units, 88.4% were owner-occupied and 11.6% were renter-occupied. The homeowner vacancy rate was 0.4% and the rental vacancy rate was 18.4%.

100.0% of residents lived in urban areas, while 0% lived in rural areas.

=== 2018 American Community Survey ===
The median household income in 2018 was $75,234. The median rent was $1,064 and 85 residents were unemployed at the 2018 census estimates.

=== 2000 census ===
At the census of 2000, there were 1,960 people, 655 households, and 535 families residing in the city. The population density was 930.8 inhabitants per square mile (359.4/km^{2}). There were 708 housing units at an average density of 336.2 per square mile (129.8/km^{2}). The racial makeup of the city was 74.03% White, 3.11% African American, 0.51% Native American, 0.82% Asian, 20.46% from other races, and 1.07% from two or more races. Hispanic or Latino of any race were 43.62% of the population.

There were 655 households, out of which 32.8% had children under the age of 18 living with them, 66.9% were married couples living together, 9.6% had a female householder with no husband present, and 18.2% were non-families. 13.6% of all households were made up of individuals, and 5.0% had someone living alone who was 65 years of age or older. The average household size was 2.99 and the average family size was 3.22.

In the city, the population was spread out, with 24.9% under the age of 18, 8.8% from 18 to 24, 31.0% from 25 to 44, 22.3% from 45 to 64, and 13.0% who were 65 years of age or older. The median age was 37 years. For every 100 females, there were 117.5 males. For every 100 females age 18 and over, there were 117.3 males.

The median income for a household in the city was $44,650, and the median income for a family was $50,625. Males had a median income of $32,500 versus $27,981 for females. The per capita income for the city was $18,609. About 10.1% of families and 16.1% of the population were below the poverty line, including 20.2% of those under age 18 and 5.6% of those age 65 or over.

== Education ==
=== Primary and secondary schools ===
Brookside Village is served by Pearland Independent School District.

One elementary school, E. A. Lawhon Elementary School, is located in Brookside Village. The school serves all of Brookside Village.

Brookside Village pupils continue on to Leon H. Sablatura Middle School and Pearland Junior High School west. Pupils east of Roy Road are zoned to Pearland High School, while pupils west of Roy Road are zoned to Glenda Dawson High School. Prior to fall 2007, when Dawson opened, all of Brookside Village was assigned to Pearland High School. All four middle, junior high, and high schools are in the city of Pearland.

=== Colleges and universities ===
The city is served by Alvin Community College.

=== Public libraries ===
The Pearland Library, in the city of Pearland, is in close proximity to Brookside Village. The library is a part of the Brazoria County Library System.

== See also ==
- List of municipalities in Texas
