= The Judy's =

Bygone Texas punk rock group from the 1980s

- Origin: Pearland, Texas, United States
- Genres: Power pop, punk rock, new wave
- Years active: 1979–1992
- Labels: Trix Music (1979-1990); Machintosh Music (1990-1992); Wasted Talent Records (2007);
- Members: David B. Bean; Dane Cessac; Jeff Walton

The Judy's were a Pearland, Texas-based punk and new wave band that flourished from the late 1970s through the early 1980s.

== History ==
The Judy's song, "Guyana Punch", recounted the infamous Jonestown massacre. Several of their songs were topical: "Dogs" refers to the Son of Sam murderer; "Radiation Squirm" refers to the Three Mile Island accident; "How's Gary" refers to the execution of convicted killer Gary Gilmore; and "Vacation in Tehran" refers to the Iranian hostage crisis, among others. On December 1, 2007, The Judy's announced the opening of their own label and website, Wasted Talent Records. On this website, the albums Moo and Washarama were released on CD and vinyl, having been previously available only on vinyl and cassette tape.

== Original personnel ==
The band was founded by four Pearland High School students: Sam Hugh Roush (a guitar, vocals) (Pearland '80), David B. Bean, (songwriter, vocals, guitars, keyboards) (Pearland '80), Dane Cessac (né Dane Urshel Cessac; born 1962) (Pearland '80), drums, vocals, and Jeff Walton (Pearland '81) (bass, vocals). Roush, while a senior in high school, died January 9, 1980, from a one-car accident near his home while driving home from school band practice. Twenty-eight days earlier, The Judy's had recorded its debut single, "Teenage Hangups." Sam's father, an educator in the Houston Public Schools, was a former musician in the Air Force Band at Connally Air Force Base in Waco, Texas. After Roush's death, The Judy's continued as a trio.

After The Judy's first disbanded, Bean, in 1983, recorded a solo EP album titled Modomusic and Walton, in 1983, recorded a solo album titled Danger Boy. Both Bean and Walton continue to make music professionally.

== Discography ==
Year	Artist	Title	Label	Notes
1980	The Judy's	Teenage Hang-Ups (45 rpm)	Wasted Talent Records (pressed by Houston Records) (Note: Houston Records was founded in 1958 when Gasper Patrick Puccio, Jr. (1926–2005), bought the vinyl presses from Don Robey (1903–1975), owner of Peacock and Duke Records. Puccio was a brother of Vincent John Puccio (1914–1998) who, in 1947, who founded Broadway Records in Los Angeles. ("Houston Records"))	Side A – 501-A: LH-19450 Side B – 501-B: LH-19451: 1. "You Let Me Down"; 2. "All the Pretty Girls"; 3. "Space Age"; Recorded December 12, 1979, at Rampart Studios, Houston, with original guitarist Sam Roush. The label, on both sides, and the album cover back reads, "A tribute to Sam". No official release date of CD format. Roush was also included as an extra on the original vinyl release of Wonderful World of Appliances.
1980	The Judy's	Wonderful World of Appliances (45 rpm EP) (another defective product)	Wasted Talent Records (pressed by Houston Records)	Side 1: LH-19841 Side 2: LH-19842: 1. "Radiation Squirm"; 2. "Zoo"; 3. "Hows Gary?"; 4. "Vacation In Tehran"; 5. "Dogs"; 6. "Underwater Fun"; Album cover back reads, "Try different speeds for lots of laughs at parties, etc." OCLC 768347345. All tracks available on Washarama CD
1981	The Judy's	Washarama (LP)	Wasted Talent Records; JWT-2324	Side 1: LH-21258 Side 2: LH-21259: 1. "High Society"; 2. "Her Wave"; 3. "Man On A Window Ledge"; 4. "T.V."; 5. "Rerun"; 6. "Mental Obsession"; 7. "Girls! Girls! Girls!"; 8. "Right Down The Line"; 9. "You Never Call Me"; 10. "Guyana Punch"; 11. "She's Got The Beat"; 12. "All The Pretty Girls"; Re-released 2007 on CD, adding the 6 tracks from Wonderful World of Appliances; OCLC 910243644
1983	David Bean	Modomusic (EP)	Wasted Talent Records	1. "Marsha's Car"; 2. "My Imagination"; 3. "Island"; 4. "Watch Her Go"; 5. "I Project"; 6. "Betty-O!"; 7. "Keep Breathing"; Recorded at Rampart Studios, Houston; OCLC 767519209
1983	Jeff Walton	"Danger Boy" (45 rpm EP)	O'Tropiko Records	1. "Danger Boy"; 2. "They Go Down"; 3. "Big Whoop-De-Doo"; 4. "Tropical Sonata in E♭"; OCLC 41294274
1985	The Judy's	Moo (LP)	Trix Music, Wasted Talent Records (2007)	Side A: Side B: 1. "Teenage Millionaire"; 2. "Magazine Man"; 3. "Trixie and the Killer"; 4. "He's the One for Her"; 5. "Wilma a Go-Go; 6. "Joey the Mechanical Boy; 7. "Grass is Greener" (Note: "Grass is Greener," by David Bean, is a song about a boy who wants to be a girl (and vice versa).); 8. "Perfect Crime"; 9. "Ghost in a Bikini"; 10. "Don't Be a Hippie"; 11. "Milk"; 12. "The Moo Song"; Re-released 2007 and 2009 on CDs which also included tracks of Bean's solo EP Modomusic (stylized as modomusic); OCLC 945700052.
1987	The Judy's (Ансамбль Джудиз)	"Girl of 1000 Smells" (33 1/3 rpm single)	Wasted Talent Records; JWT 5019	Side A: Side B: 1. "Girl of 1000 Smells"; 2. "Девочка 1000 Запахов"; 7" 33 1/3 rpm single; A side English; B side in Russian. New personnel: Scott Krchnak (né Ladgie Scott Krchnak; born 1963) (sax, keyboard, guitar, vocals); Matthew McCarthy (drums, vocals) – Cessac is not on these recordings. There is no official release on CD format. Recorded at Rivendell Studios, Houston. Re-recorded and mixed at Rampart Recording Studio, Houston. The record was pressed in white vinyl and packaged in a scented box; the record included a booklet entitled A Guide to Good Odors.
1990	The Judy's	Land of Plenty (LP)	Wasted Talent Records	1. "Opening Theme" ("Counting Clouds"); 2. "Superman"; 3. "Riding in a U.F.O."; 4. "Celebrity"; 5. "When She Was Good"; 6. "Speak French"; 7. "Middle of the Road"; 8. "There Goes the Neighborhood"; 9. "Sweet Life"; 10. "Train"; 11. "Land of Plenty"; 12. "Jesus Be My Airplane"; 13. "Land of Plenty" (reprise); New lineup, shelved after a few copies were made and officially released 2007 on CD

== Filmography ==
The 1988 film, Married to the Mob, used the song "Ghost in a Bikini," composed by David Bean from The Judy's 1985 Moo album.

== Documentary ==
The Judys is a short 2003 documentary on YouTube by Elizabeth Skadden.

== Bibliography ==
=== References ===
- Ankeny, Jason. "The Judy's". AllMusic (artist biography). All Media Network.
- Curtis, Gregory (October 1985). "Behind the Lines". Texas Monthly. 13 (10). ISSN 0148-7736.
- Gunnarsson, Tommy (September 25, 2002). "Interview With David Bean of the Judy's". Pennyblackmusic (online music magazine). Cologne.
- "Houston Records Press On". Billboard. ("Spotlight on Texas" issue). Vol. 82, no. 47. November 21, 1970 – via Internet Archive.
- Skadden, Elizabeth (née; Elizabeth Marguerite Skadden; born 1981) (2003). "The Judy's" – via YouTube (7 min., 45 sec.) (the fifth of eight short videos by producer-director Elizabeth Skadden in an early career collection titled Alles in Ordnung. Video includes commentary by Louis Black of The Austin Chronicle)
- Wilonsky, Robert (July 23, 1998). "All the Catchy Songs". Dallas Observer.
