= Hastings Oilfield =

Petroleum reservoir in Texas, US

- Location within Texas
- Coordinates: 29.4872°N 95.2374°W
- Owner: Amoco

Field history
- Start of production: December 23, 1934
- Peak of production: 656.2 million
- Peak year: 1984

Production
- Producing formations: Marginlina, Frio, Vicksburg

Hastings Oilfield is an approximately 20-square-mile petroleum reservoir in Brazoria and Galveston County, Texas, United States.

== History ==
Hastings Oilfield was discovered by J. W. Surface of Amoco, and was first drilled on December 23 or 29, 1934. Within two days of the discovery, Edgar F. Bullard, also of Amoco, purchased the deed to the land, for $1 per acre. The price soon rose to $5,000 per acre. On October 1, 1958, Hastings Oilfield split between Hastings West and East due to the Long Point–Eureka Heights fault system. Production had stagnated by 1990. In 2009, Denbury Resources acquired the land from Venoco, for $201 million. In 2010, production resumed.

== Geology ==
Hastings Oilfield is situated in the Frio Deep-Seated Salt Dome Fields. Its oil dates to the Oligocene, from the Marginlina, Frio and Vicksburg formations.

== Oil production ==
In 1984, 656.2 million barrels were produced; 108.4 million from Hastings East and 547.8 million from Hastings West. 12.7 million barrels were produced a day; 1.06 from Hastings East and 11.6 from Hastings West. By 1985, all but 5 oil wells were operating, all needing artificial lifts to produce; a total of 297 wells needed lifts to operate.
