= Glenda Dawson High School =

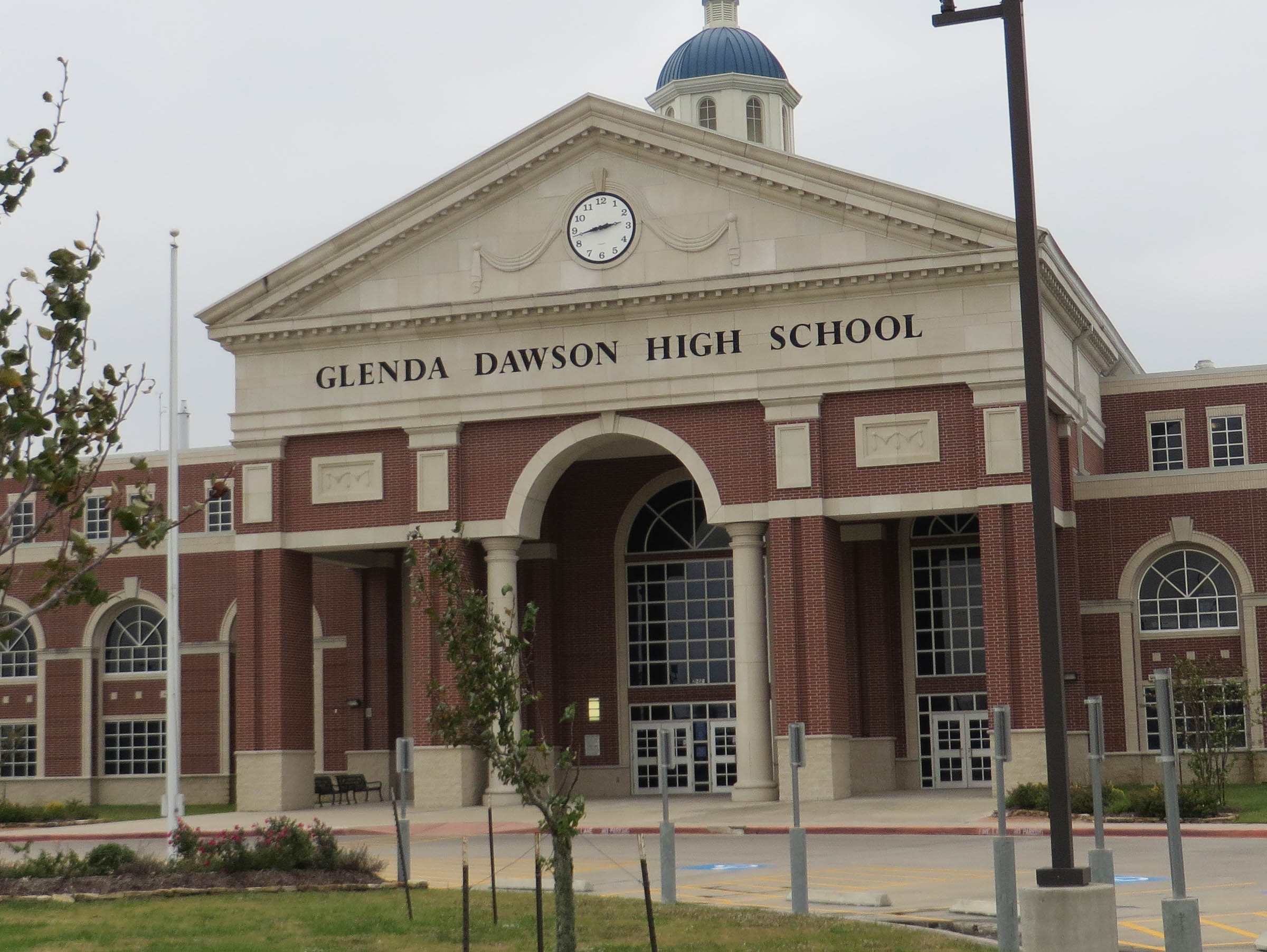

Location
- 2050 Cullen Blvd; Pearland, Texas 77584; United States; 29°34′25″N 95°21′10″W

Information
- School type: Public high school
- Motto: "Some Fly, We Soar"
- Established: 2007; 19 years ago
- School district: Pearland Independent School District
- NCES School ID: 483444011446
- Principal: Erin Hamman
- Staff: 143.36 (on an FTE basis)
- Grades: 9-12
- Enrollment: 2,548 (2023–2024)
- Student to teacher ratio: 17.77
- Colors: Red, white, and blue
- Mascot: Eagle
- Rival: Pearland High School
- Yearbook: Into the Light
- Website: dhs.pearlandisd.org

Glenda Dawson High School (DHS) is a public high school in Pearland, Texas, United States. It is a part of the Pearland Independent School District serving grades 9 through 12. In 2014, the school was awarded a national rank of 1,165th by U.S. News & World Report, which puts it in the silver medal category. As of 2024, U.S. News & World Report ranks it 142nd in Texas and 1,186th nationally. For the 2024-2025 school year, the school was given an "A" by the Texas Education Agency.

== History ==
Dawson, which opened in fall 2007, relieved students from the over-crowded Pearland High School. Dawson serves sections of Pearland, sections of Brookside Village, and unincorporated areas (including Silverlake). The school was named after former Texas Representative Glenda Dawson, who taught for 34 years at Pearland High School. The groundbreaking ceremony occurred on August 1, 2007, with the school opening for the start of the 2009–10 school year. In fall 2007, the current Pearland Ninth Grade Center was converted into a temporary Dawson High School for two years; it served 9th and 10th graders the first year and 9th, 10th, and 11th graders in the second year.

Dawson High School's mascot is the Eagle, the same mascot as Pearland's Challenger Elementary School. Dawson's school colors are red, white, and blue.

The school was originally designed to house about 2,000 students. On March 8, 2013, the school had 2,110 students. By 2013 the growing enrollment meant that the school could be reclassified into a higher University Interscholastic League (UIL) ranking, affecting the placement of its athletic teams. The district estimated that enrollment at Dawson would reach 2,500 by 2021. In 2015 Pearland ISD administrators told members of the PISD board of trustees that they may want to have another bond election in 2016. In November 2016, the bond passed.

== Extracurricular activities ==
=== Athletics ===
The Dawson Eagles compete in these sports

- Baseball
- Basketball
- Cross Country
- Football
- Golf
- Lacrosse (with Pearland Youth Lacrosse)
- Powerlifting
- Soccer
- Softball
- Swimming and Diving
- Tennis
- Track and Field
- Volleyball
- Water Polo

==== State Finalists ====
- Volleyball
  - 2025(6A/D1)

== Feeder patterns ==
The following elementary schools feed into Dawson:

- Challenger
- Silvercrest
- Silverlake
- Carleston (partial)
- Lawhon (partial)
- Massey Ranch (partial)

The following middle schools feed into Dawson:

- Rogers Middle School
- Jamison Middle School (Partial)
- Sablatura Middle School (Partial)

The following junior high schools feed into Dawson -

- Berry Miller Junior High School
- Pearland Junior High West (Partial)
- Pearland Junior High South (Partial)

== Notable alumni ==
- Joirdon Nicholas (born 1999), basketball player for Maccabi Ashdod in the Israeli Basketball Premier League
- Alyah Chanelle Scott — actress
