= Pearland Town Center =

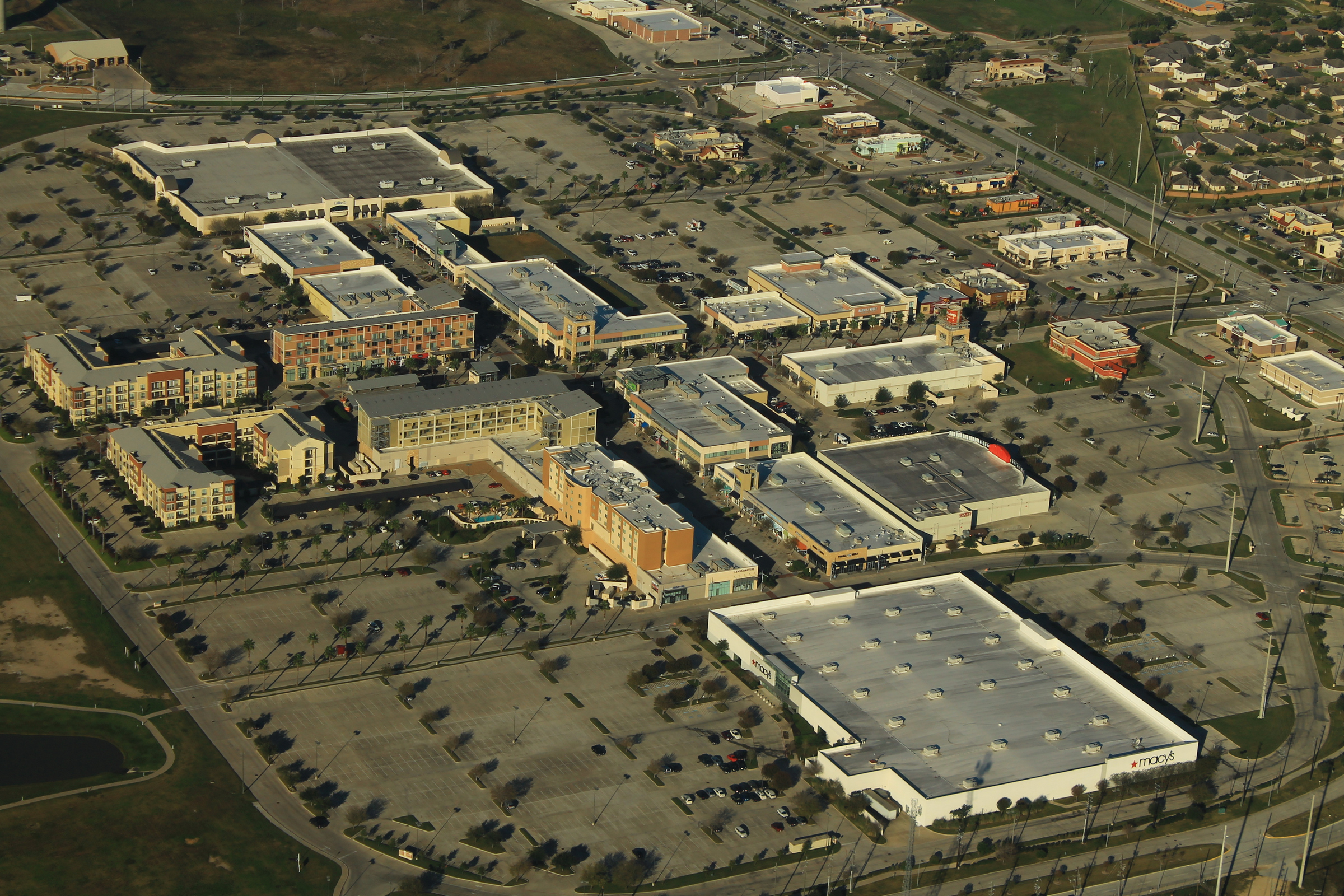
- Aerial view of Pearland Town Center
- Location: Pearland, Texas, United States
- Coordinates: 29.553°N 95.394°W
- Address: 11200 Broadway Street
- Opened: July 30, 2008 (18 years ago)
- Developer: CBL properties
- Manager: CBL & Associates Properties
- Owner: CBL & Associates Properties and TIAA
- Num. of stores: 90
- Num. of anchor tenants: 4
- Floor area: 1,100,000 sq ft (100,000 m^{2}).
- Floors: 1
- Parking: 3,546 spaces
- Website: pearlandtowncenter.com

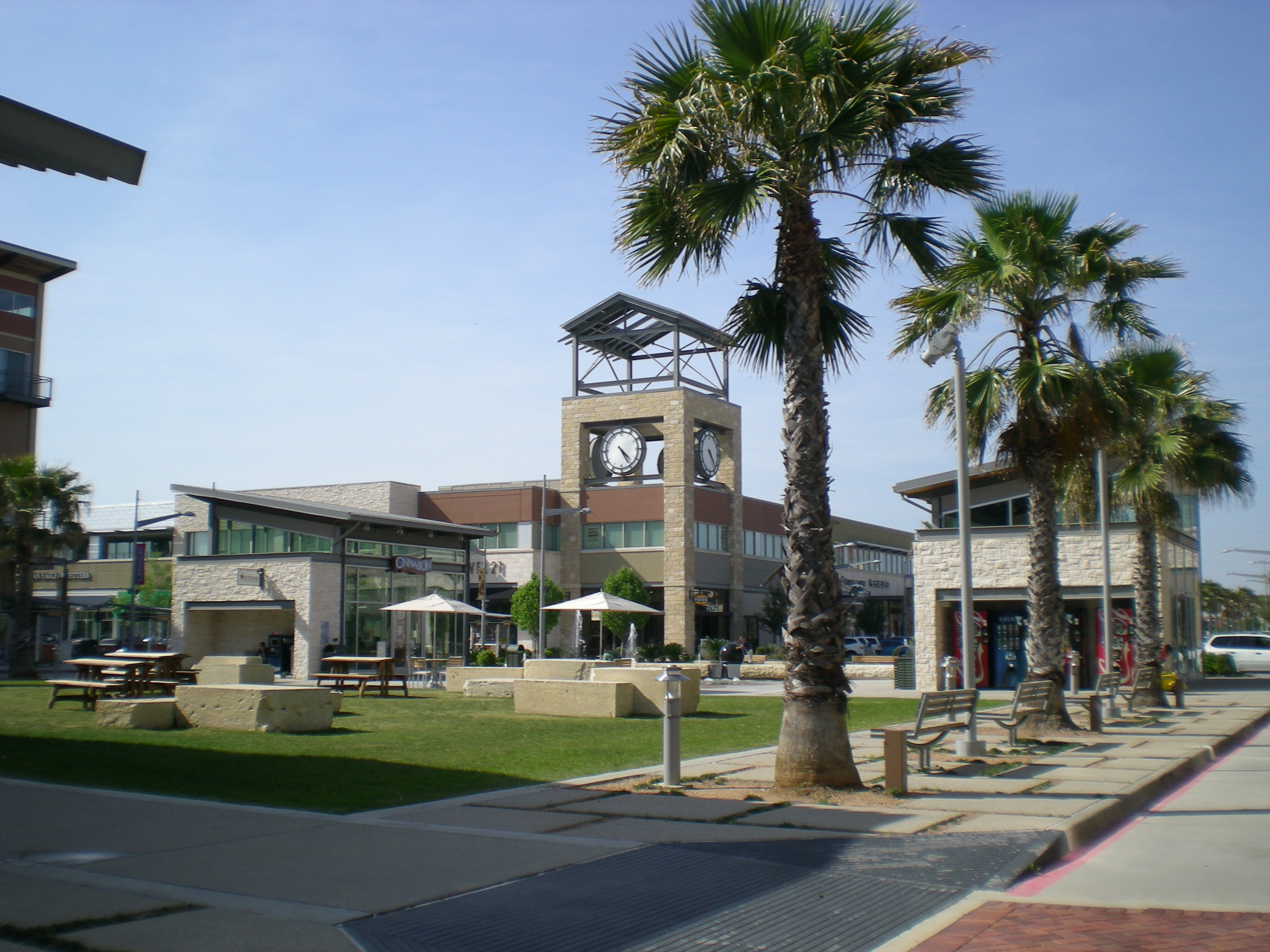
Pearland Town Center

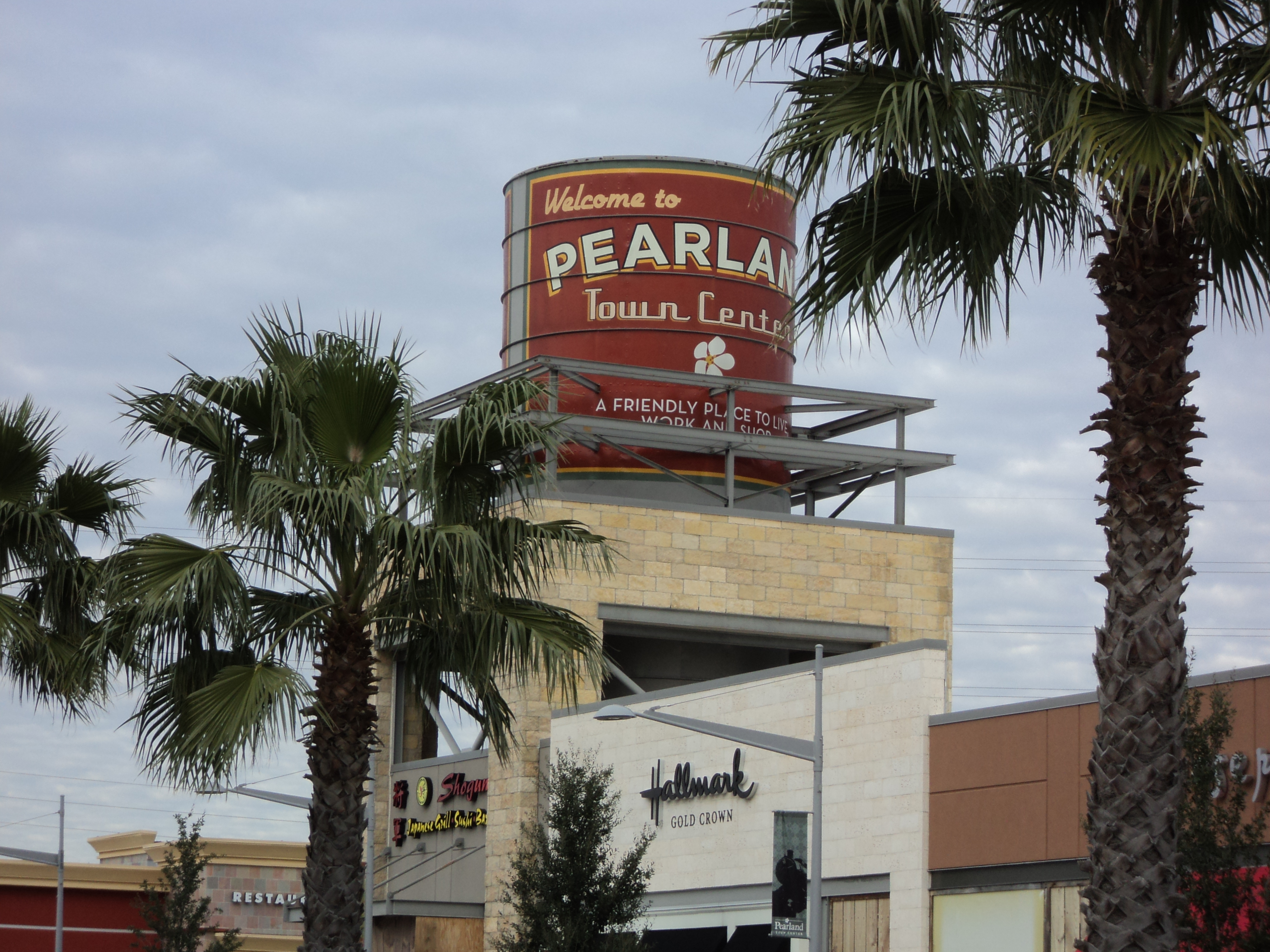
Pearland Town Center sign

Pearland Town Center is a lifestyle center concept regional shopping mall located in the city of Pearland, Texas south of Houston. Managed by CBL & Associates, the center was completed in 2008 and includes three anchor stores with room for an additional anchor store. In May 2011, it was announced that TIAA-CREF would receive 12% ownership of Pearland Town Center in an attempt to reduce CBL's debt. The anchor stores are Barnes & Noble, Dillard's, Macy's, and Dick's Sporting Goods.

== About the center ==
Pearland Town Center houses three anchor stores: Barnes & Noble, Dillard's, and Macy's. Designed by the Omniplan architectural firm, the center is home to several restaurants and retail stores that are new to the Pearland area. The center provides retail, residential, office and hotel space within the 1,100,000-square-foot (100,000 m^{2}) open-air lifestyle center. A 110-room, four-story Courtyard by Marriott hotel is located above the center's retail shops near Macy's. Pearland Town Center includes office and multi-family residential space above the stores, a 25-acre (100,000 m^{2}) lake and adjacent walking paths and parks. Pearland Town Center is one of two malls to open in the Houston area in 2008, along with Houston Premium Outlets in March 2008 which is located in Cypress, Texas, and both utilize the "lifestyle center/outdoor mall" concept. The center contains the most recently constructed Dillard's and Macy's locations in Southeast Texas, since 2003.

Pearland Town Center houses 80 fashion retailers and specialty boutiques. It is estimated that Pearland Town Center will bring 1,500 jobs to the Pearland area and will generate $250 million in sales each year, taking up nearly one-third of the city's economy. The Macy's store in Pearland Town Center is the first to be constructed in Houston after the integration of Foley's with Macy's and is the 17th location in the Houston area.

Pearland Town Center set a new standard in the shopping center industry by opening with 85% leased and committed (many unoccupied spaces). The level of leasing demonstrates the rapid growth of the Pearland market.
