= Pearland Independent School District =

School district in Texas, United States

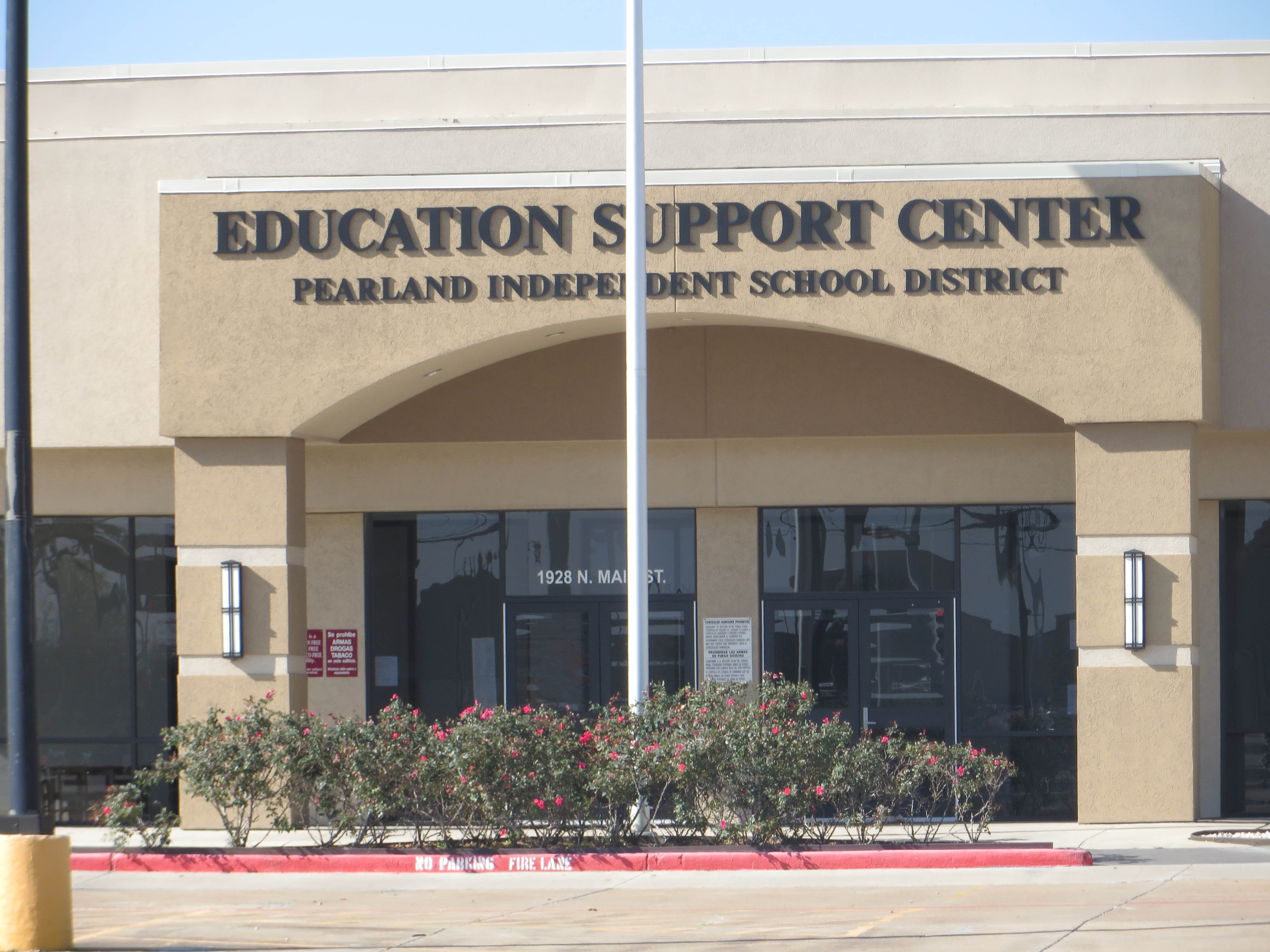

Address
- 1928 North Main Pearland, Texas, 77581; United States

District information
- Type: Public school district
- Grades: PK–12
- Established: 1937; 89 years ago
- Superintendent: Larry Berger
- Schools: 24
- NCES District ID: 4834440

Students and staff
- Students: 21,111 (2023–2024)
- Teachers: 1,285.61 (on an FTE basis)
- Student–teacher ratio: 16.42:1

Other information
- Website: www.pearlandisd.org

Pearland Independent School District is a school district based in Pearland, Texas, United States.

Pearland ISD serves most of the city of Pearland, the city of Brookside Village, and unincorporated areas in Brazoria County (including Silverlake). A small portion of the district extends into Harris County.

Each house or residential area in Pearland is zoned to an elementary school (grades PK-4), a middle school (5-6), a junior high school (7-8), and one of the two high schools (9-12).

Larry Berger was named the district's 11th superintendent in March 2022, after an internal search following the retirement of Dr. John P. Kelly. Berger officially became superintendent after board approval on April 12, 2022. Prior to his new position, Berger served Pearland ISD as assistant superintendent for support services for two years, was the director of the district's maintenance and operations department from 2016 to 2020, and as an administrator at Pearland High School from 2007 to 2016.

In 2009, the school district was rated "academically acceptable" by the Texas Education Agency.

== History ==
Pearland Independent School District was established in 1937. The original high school building and elementary campus still stand on Grand Boulevard in the heart of Pearland. Pearland ISD's growth has exploded since the city was named an "All-American Town" in the mid-1990s, and the district, as well as the city, saw tremendous growth from 25,000 in 1985, to more than 100,000 in 2008. The district has kept up with the growth by building campuses and other facilities to maintain students. In 2006, Pearland ISD began using the International Baccalaureate curriculum guidelines in their elementary and middle school campuses. In addition to the city of Pearland, Pearland ISD also serves the communities of Brookside Village and Silverlake. Brookside Village is a small village located to the north of Pearland, and Silverlake is a master-planned community that sits outside of Pearland's western city limits.

Past Superintendents:

- B.B. Ainsworth (1937–1944)
- H.L. McAninch (1944–1947)
- J.D. Gray (1947–1958)
- Dr. Lloyd R. Ferguson (1958–1966)
- Steven Prensner (1966–1968)
- Robert Turner (1968–1976)
- G. Preston Bullard (1976–1991)
- James P. Schleider (1991–2000)
- Dr. Bonny Cain (2000–2011)
- Dr. John Kelly (2011–2022)
- Larry Berger (2022–present)

== Standardized dress ==
Since 2001, all Pearland ISD schools are required to enact a "standardized dress" code, which is similar to a school uniform requiring students in grades 5 through 12 to tuck their shirts in along with more dresscode rules. But as of 2011 the dress code has changed- Jr. High and High school students can wear jeans instead of khakis, belts are no longer required, students do not have to tuck their shirts in, and middle school students can wear shorts.

In 2011 the PISD board relaxed the rules by removing the requirement to tuck in shirts, allowing jeans at the middle and high school levels, allowing shorts at the middle school level, removing the requirement for belts at the junior high school level, and allowing spirit shirts with larger logos. In 2013 the district began allowing shoes with glitter and decorations on trouser pockets.

During the 2015–2016 term, 6,000 students and parents signed a petition which successfully relaxed the Pearland dress code. Pearland students can now wear any solid-color T-shirt and colored pants.

In 2019, the school district was sued after staff colored in a black student's hair.

== List of schools ==
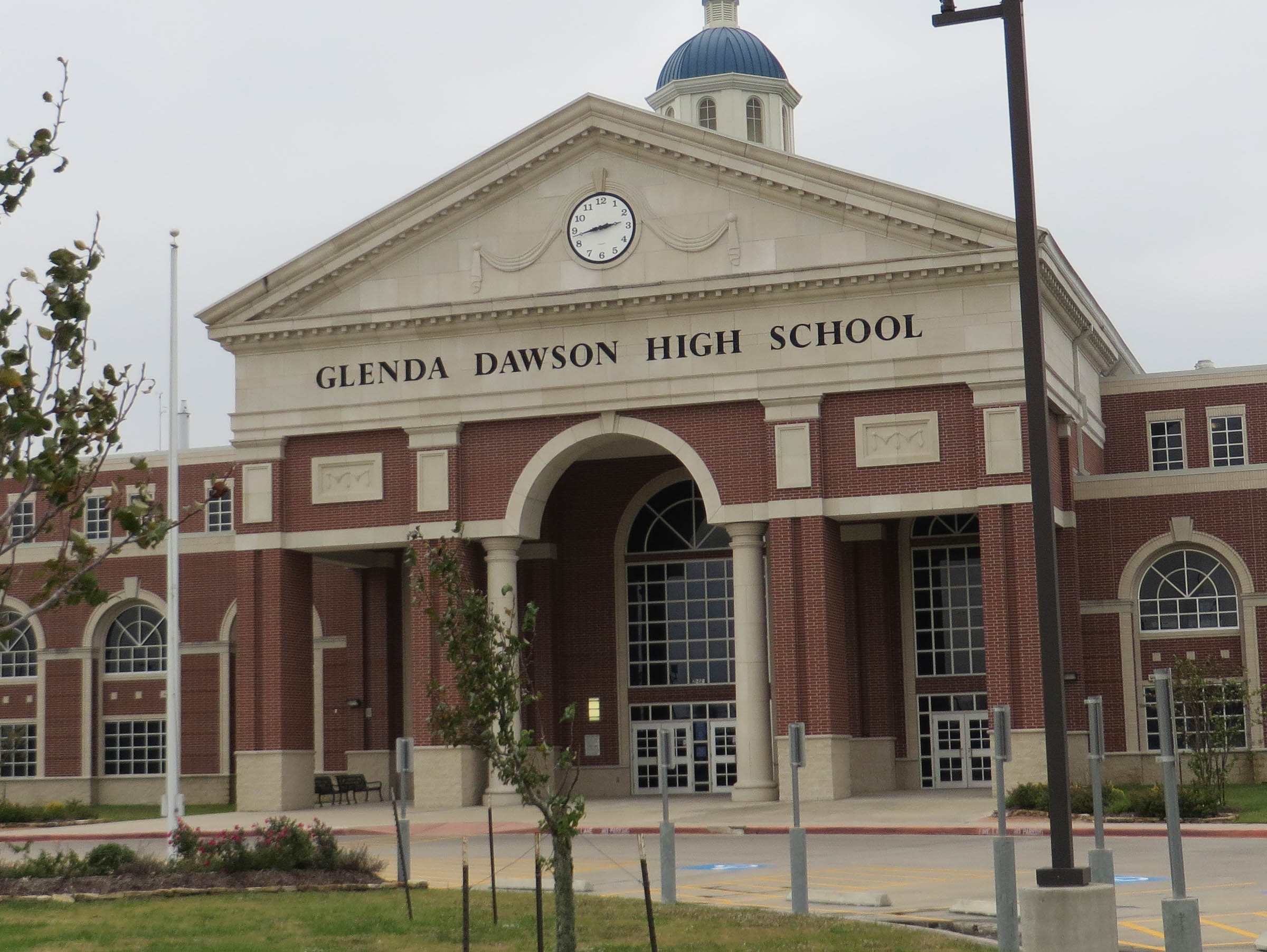
Glenda Dawson High School

=== High schools (9–12) ===
- Glenda Dawson High School (opened 2007)
- Pearland High School, opened 1938, also home of the Sheryl Searcy Campus (former Ninth Grade Center (NGC))
- Robert Turner College and Career High School (opened 2013)

=== Junior high schools (7–8) ===
- Berry Miller Junior High School (opened 2008)
- Pearland Junior High School East Campus (opened 1959) (formerly Pearland Jr. High from 1959 to 1972, * Pearland Intermediate School from 1972 to 1993)
- Pearland Junior High School South Campus (opened 2002)
- Pearland Junior High School West Campus (opened 1993)

=== Middle schools (5–6) ===
- Alexander Middle School (opened 2007)
- Sam Jamison Middle School (opened 1982)
- Rogers Middle School (opened 2003)
- Leon H. Sablatura Middle Schooll (opened 1997)

=== Elementary schools (PK–4) ===
- Herbert C. Carleston Elementary School (opened 1980)
- Challenger Elementary School (opened 1993)
- Barbara Cockrell Elementary School (opened 2007)
- C.J. Harris Elementary School (opened 1938) (formerly Pearland Elementary from 1938 to 1980)
- E.A. Lawhon Elementary School (opened 1963) (formerly Brookside Elementary from 1963 to 1980)
- Magnolia Elementary School (opened 2007)
- Massey Ranch Elementary School (opened 2006)
- Rustic Oak Elementary School (opened 1993)
- Shadycrest Elementary School (opened 1969)
- Silvercrest Elementary School (opened 2002)
- Silverlake Elementary School (opened 1998)

=== Alternative Schools ===
- PACE Center (opened 1992) (PACE is home to Pearland Alternative Learning Academy, Pearland Academic Center for Excellence and PEARS)

== See also ==
- List of school districts in Texas
