= Pearland High School =

Public school in Texas, United States

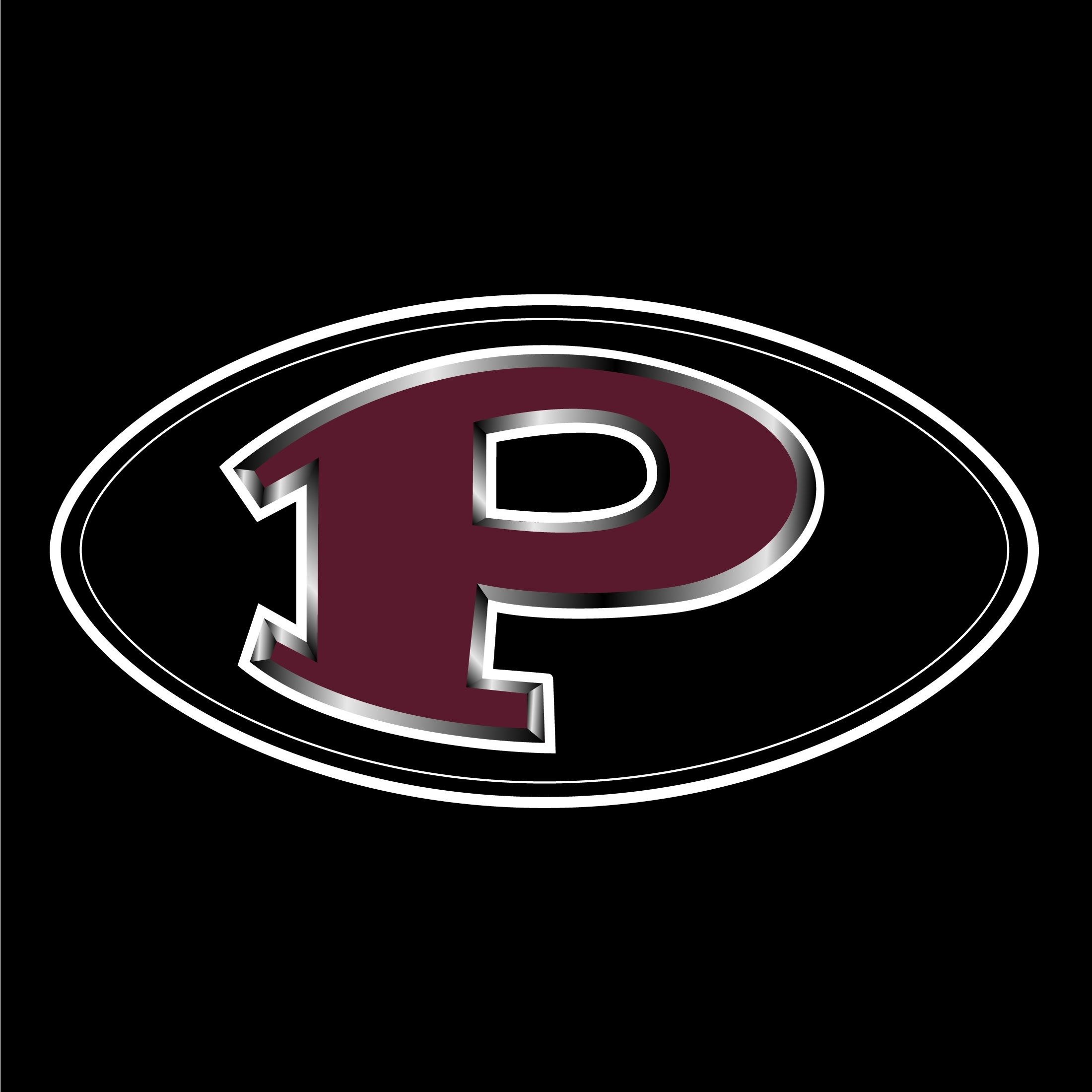

Location
- 3775 South Main Street; Pearland, Texas; United States; 29.53917°N 95.27013°W

Information
- Type: Public high school
- Motto: Pride, Honor, Success
- Established: 1938
- Principal: Adrian Washburn
- Faculty: 176
- Teaching staff: 193.21 (FTE)
- Grades: 9–12
- Enrollment: 3,400 (2023–2024)
- Student to teacher ratio: 17.60
- Campus: Suburban
- Colors: Maroon, white and black
- Mascot: Derrick
- Yearbook: The Gusher
- Website: Official Website

Pearland High School (PHS) is an American public high school, located in Pearland, Texas, south of Houston. It is one of three high schools in the Pearland Independent School District, and serves parts of Pearland and most of the city of Brookside Village. U.S. News & World Report ranks it 242nd in Texas and 2,689th nationally. For the 2024-2025 school year, the school was given a "A" by the Texas Education Agency.

== Background and history ==
Prior to the school's establishment in 1937, Pearland students had to attend secondary school in Webster. The first graduating class in 1938 included valedictorian was Beatrice Woods who would become Beatrice Woods Theriot after marrying Melvin Theriot.

The original Pearland School, opened in 1937, had a staff of about 12 people and served 58 students in 1st through 12th grades on Grand Boulevard.

In 1953, the campus moved to Galveston Avenue, and the Grand Boulevard school became Pearland Elementary (later C.J. Harris Elementary). In 1991, the high school moved again, to Main Street (SH 35). The Galveston Avenue property is now home to the Pearland Historical Society, a Brazoria County Tax Office annex, Pearland Junior High School West Campus, and Leon H. Sablatura Middle School.

The school's mascot is the "Oiler Man" or "Oiler". In contrast to the local legend, the mascot was not inspired by the Houston Oilers professional football team (the school was established 25 years before the team). Instead it is a tribute to an important sector of the local and regional economy. Several local businesses in Pearland are related to the oil industry, including a helicopter service that ferries people to nearby off-shore oil wells in the Gulf of Mexico.

The current Pearland High School campus opened in 1991, on South Main Street. The original building (called the South Campus) has a capacity of 2,200 students. The building houses the auditorium, 2 gymnasiums (one was converted into a weight room), several vocational trades shops, and the athletic locker rooms.

In 1998, a 1,750-student capacity building was built adjacent to Pearland High School. This building houses three gymnasiums, a teaching theater, a broadcast studio, and a large cafeteria. This building was called the "North Campus" until being renamed for the late Sheryl Searcy, a longtime reading teacher at Pearland High School in 2009.

Glenda Dawson High School opened in 2007, relieving the overcrowded Pearland High School.

The school's marching band performed in the 2020 Rose Parade in Pasadena, CA on New Year's Day.

== Athletics ==
The Pearland Oilers compete in these sports -

- Baseball
- Basketball
- Cross Country
- Football
- Golf
- Powerlifting
- Soccer
- Softball
- Swimming and Diving
- Water Polo
- Tennis
- Track and Field
- Volleyball

=== Football ===
During the 2010 Football season, the Pearland High School football team had a perfect 16–0 record and upset the Euless Trinity Trojans in the Texas 5A State Football Championship. Notable athletes on the team include QB Trey Anderson, RB Dustin Garrison, DE Samuel Ukwuachu, and LB Kendall Ehrlich. The football team returned to the state championship game in 2013, but lost to the Kyler Murray led Allen Eagles in a blowout.

On October 3, 2014, its football team defeated the Dawson Eagles. This was the first year that Pearland and Dawson had ever played each other in a football game. Pearland would win again in 2015. In 2016 and 2017, Dawson would take the victory over Pearland. In the 2018 game held in the University of Houston’s TDECU Stadium, Pearland defeated Dawson. However, in 2019 and 2020, Dawson would take back the win. During the 2021-2022 season, Pearland took their revenge and defeated Dawson.

== Notable alumni ==
- Ricky Churchman – professional football safety and punt-return specialist with the San Francisco 49ers
- Jarrod Cooper – former professional football safety with the Oakland Raiders and Carolina Panthers
- Anthony Dickerson – former professional football linebacker with the Dallas Cowboys and Buffalo Bills
- Kirk Dressendorfer – former Major League Baseball pitcher
- Sincere Haynesworth – college football center for the Tulane Green Wave
- Clay Hensley – Major League Baseball pitcher
- Travis Hill – NFL football linebacker
- Isaiah Iton – NFL football defensive end
- The Judy's – punk and new wave band from 1970s and '80s
- Lauren Lanning – beauty pageant titleholder; Miss Texas USA 2006; competed in Miss USA 2006 pageant
- Donald Miller – Christian author
- Thomas Morstead – professional football punter and kickoff specialist with the New York Jets
- Cyril Obiozor – professional football linebacker with the Denver Broncos
- Derek Parish – NFL player for the Jacksonville Jaguars
- Justin Phillips – professional football linebacker with the Oakland Raiders
- Cameron Reynolds – former NBA player with the Minnesota Timberwolves, San Antonio Spurs, and Houston Rockets and current professional basketball player with Aquila Basket Trento
- Justin Reynolds – basketball player
- Megan Thee Stallion – professional rapper and artist
- Robbie Weinhardt – Major League Baseball pitcher
- Fozzy Whittaker – professional football running back and kick returner with Carolina Panthers
- Connor Wong – Major League Baseball player for the Boston Red Sox

== See also ==
- List of high schools in Texas
- Houston
