= Pearland, Texas =

City in Brazoria County, Texas, United States

- City
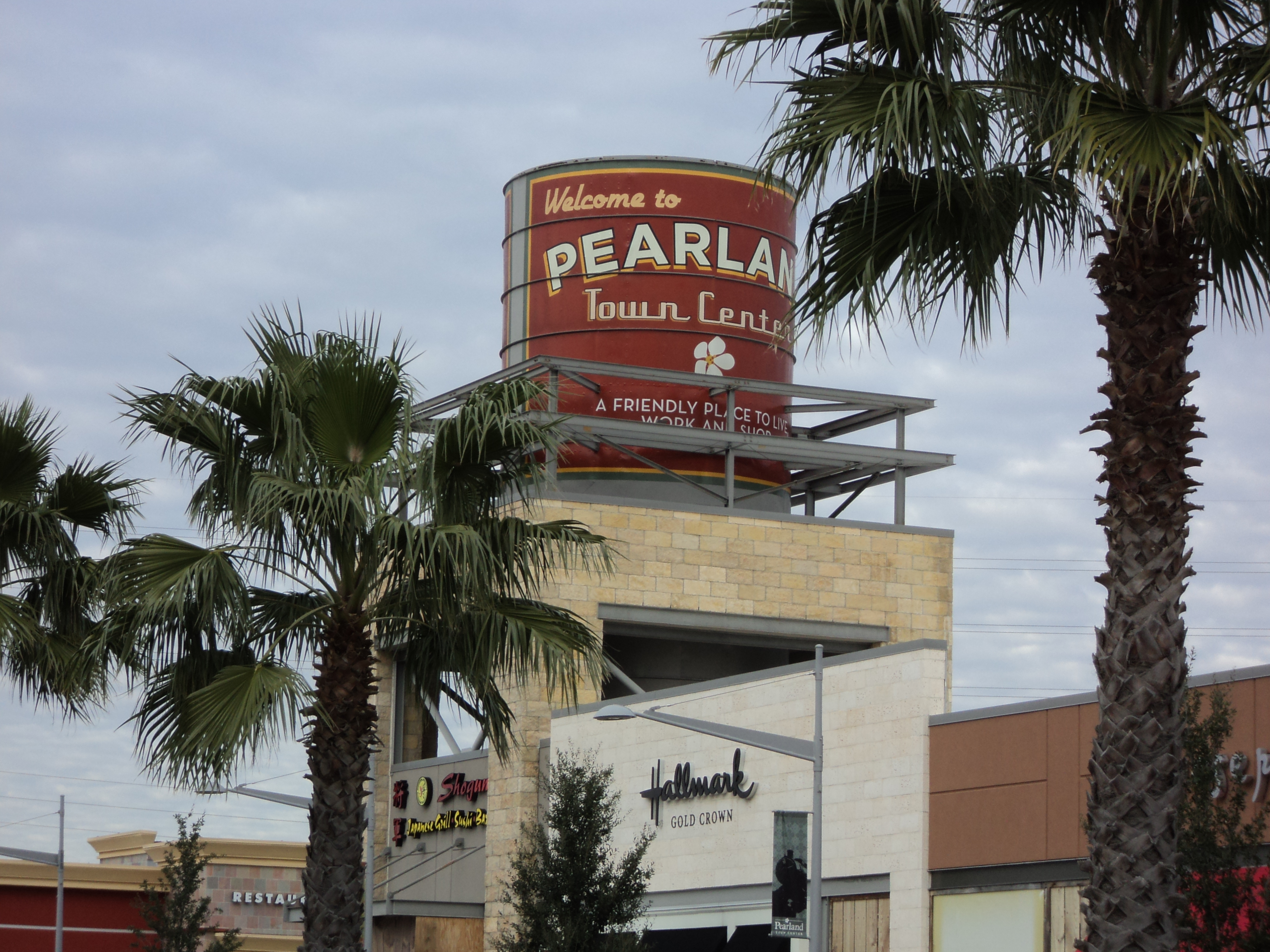
- Pearland Town Center

- Seal
- Mottoes: Where Town Meets Country; Classic Gulf Coast
- Location in Brazoria County in the state of Texas
- Coordinates: 29°33′49″N 95°17′10″W
- Country: United States
- State: Texas
- Counties: Brazoria, Fort Bend, Harris
- First Platted: September 26, 1894; 132 years ago
- Incorporated: November 1959; 67 years ago
- Founder: Witold von Zychlinski

Government
  - Type: Council-Manager
  - City Council: Mayor Quentin Wiltz; Mayor Pro Tem Clint Byrom; Joseph Koza, Jr. Tony Carbone; Mona Chavarria; Layni Cade; Rick Fernandez; Rushi Patel
  - City Manager: Trent Epperson

Area
  - Total: 48.84 sq mi (126.49 km^{2})
  - Land: 48.66 sq mi (126.03 km^{2})
  - Water: 0.17 sq mi (0.45 km^{2})
- Elevation: 49 ft (15 m)

Population (2020)
  - Total: 125,828
  - Estimate (2023): 127,736
  - Density: 2,516.5/sq mi (971.64/km^{2})
- Time zone: UTC−6 (Central (CST))
  - Summer (DST): UTC−5 (CDT)
- ZIP codes: 77581, 77584, 77588, 77089
- Area codes: 713, 281, 832, 346, 621
- FIPS code: 48-56348
- GNIS feature ID: 1343734
- Website: www.pearlandtx.gov

Pearland (/ˈpɛərlænd/ PEHR-land) is a city in Brazoria County, with portions extending into Fort Bend and Harris Counties, in Texas, United States. The city of Pearland is a principal city within the Houston–Pasadena–The Woodlands metropolitan statistical area. As of the 2020 census, Pearland had a population of 125,828, up from a population of 91,252 at the 2010 census. Pearland's population growth rate from 2000 to 2010 was 142%, which ranked Pearland as the 15th-fastest-growing city in the U.S. during that time, compared to other cities with a population of 10,000 or greater in 2000. Pearland is the third-largest city in the Greater Houston area after Houston and Pasadena, Texas.

== History ==
Pearland had its beginnings near a siding switch on the Gulf, Colorado and Santa Fe Railway in 1882. When a post office was established in 1893, the community was named "Mark Belt". On September 24, 1894, the plat of "Pear-Land" was filed with the Brazoria County courthouse by Witold von Zychlinski, a man of Polish nobility. At the time, Pearland had many fruits harvested by residents. Zychlinski saw the pear trees and decided that "Pearland" would make a good name for the community.

In the 1800s, Pearland consisted of prairie. Residents harvested fruit and vegetables such as cantaloupes, corn, figs, pears, and watermelons. Pearland was promoted by developers Allison and Richey Land Company as an "agricultural Eden". The first subdivision was called "Suburban Gardens".

The Galveston hurricanes of 1900 and 1915 destroyed most of the city's fruit trees, slowed growth for a considerable period of time, and caused a period of desertification in the area. In 1914, with agriculture rebounding and the end of desertification, Pearland had a population of 400, but a devastating freeze in 1918 was another setback to the local farming enterprises. Oil was discovered nearby in 1934, which led to the development of the Hastings Oilfield, though it did not spur much growth, as the population fluctuated between 150 and 350. In the 1930s and 1940s, Pearland had many dance halls and beer joints that entertained people from the Hastings and Manvel oil fields.

Pearland incorporated in November 1959, with an area encompassing two square miles and a population of 1,910. In 1960, amidst a frenzy of cities incorporating or protecting large swathes of land in Brazoria County, Pearland annexed a 100 foot wide strip that encircled 60 square miles and extended westward to the Fort Bend County line to protect the area from annexation by Houston.

From the 1970s, the town has grown to its present-day population. By 1990, the city limits had extended into Harris County. In the 1990s, home developers began buying large tracts of land, changing the geography of the city. Former rice fields were filled with houses. The historic town center of Pearland is at the intersection of Texas State Highway 35/Main and Broadway. West Pearland has a lot of suburban development, while East Pearland has older houses, and according to Maggie Galehouse of the Houston Chronicle, Pearland's "rural roots still show" in the east side. Pearland's main east–west corridor is Farm to Market Road 518/Broadway.

== Geography ==
Pearland is within northern Brazoria County at 29°33′49″N 95°17′10″W, south of the city of Houston. Portions of the city extend north into Harris County, and a smaller portion extends west into Fort Bend County. The city is bordered by Houston and Brookside Village to the north, Manvel to the south, Almeda Rd/FM 521 to the west, and Friendswood to the east. Downtown Houston is about 16 miles (26 km) to the north of the city.

According to the United States Census Bureau, Pearland has a total area of 47.5 square miles (122.9 km^{2}), of which 0.46 square miles (1.2 km^{2}), or 0.94%, is covered by water. In 2009, the city reported that the combined area of the city limits and of nearby unincorporated areas, including Country Place and Silverlake, was 72 square miles (190 km^{2}).

=== Neighborhoods ===
About 83% of Pearland is residential, which is a major contributing factor to the high population. The city is home to many master-planned communities; Sunrise Lakes, Southern Trails, Southdown, Lakes of Highland Glen, and Shadow Creek Ranch are among the most popular master-planned communities in Brazoria County. Country Place and Silverlake are in unincorporated areas near Pearland.

== Demographics ==
Historical population
Census	Pop.	Note	%±
1960	1,497		—
1970	6,444		330.5%
1980	13,248		105.6%
1990	18,697		41.1%
2000	37,640		101.3%
2010	91,252		142.4%
2020	125,828		37.9%
U.S. Decennial Census

As of the 2020 census, 125,828 people and 32,177 families resided in the city.

=== Racial and ethnic composition ===
Pearland city, Texas – Racial and ethnic composition Note: the US Census treats Hispanic/Latino as an ethnic category. This table excludes Latinos from the racial categories and assigns them to a separate category. Hispanics/Latinos may be of any race.
Race / Ethnicity (NH = Non-Hispanic)	Pop 2000	Pop 2010	Pop 2020	% 2000	% 2010	% 2020
White alone (NH)	27,629	44,522	46,138	73.40%	48.79%	36.67%
Black or African American alone (NH)	1,968	14,709	24,482	5.23%	16.12%	19.46%
Native American or Alaska Native alone (NH)	111	255	246	0.29%	0.28%	0.20%
Asian alone (NH)	1,355	11,206	18,669	3.60%	12.28%	14.84%
Native Hawaiian or Pacific Islander alone (NH)	14	29	64	0.04%	0.03%	0.05%
Other race alone (NH)	47	194	544	0.12%	0.21%	0.43%
Multiracial (NH)	409	1,643	4,560	1.09%	1.80%	3.62%
Hispanic or Latino (any race)	6,107	18,694	31,125	16.22%	20.49%	24.74%
Total	37,640	91,252	125,828	100.00%	100.00%	100.00%

=== 2020 census ===
The median age was 36.8 years. 26.9% of residents were under the age of 18 and 12.3% of residents were 65 years of age or older. For every 100 females there were 92.7 males, and for every 100 females age 18 and over there were 88.3 males age 18 and over. There were 43,225 households in Pearland, of which 42.8% had children under the age of 18 living in them. Of all households, 59.9% were married-couple households, 12.6% were households with a male householder and no spouse or partner present, and 23.0% were households with a female householder and no spouse or partner present. About 19.4% of all households were made up of individuals and 6.6% had someone living alone who was 65 years of age or older. There were 45,403 housing units, of which 4.8% were vacant. The homeowner vacancy rate was 1.6% and the rental vacancy rate was 9.1%. 99.9% of residents lived in urban areas, while 0.1% lived in rural areas.

Racial composition as of the 2020 census
Race	Number	Percent
White	53,512	42.5%
Black or African American	24,991	19.9%
American Indian and Alaska Native	668	0.5%
Asian	18,848	15.0%
Native Hawaiian and Other Pacific Islander	84	0.1%
Some other race	9,207	7.3%
Two or more races	18,518	14.7%
Hispanic or Latino (of any race)	31,125	24.7%

=== 2019 estimates ===
Residents of Pearland had an owner-occupied housing rate of 75.9%. The median value of owner-occupied housing units was $244,800 and the median gross rent was $1,413. From 2015 to 2019, the median household income was $104,504 and the per capita income was $42,211. Roughly 3.5% of the local population lived at or below the poverty line. In 2019, 39.0% of Pearland was non-Hispanic White, 14.7% Black or African American, 1.2% American Indian or Alaska Native, 15.0% Asian, 0.9% multiracial, and 29.3% Hispanic or Latino of any race.

=== 2010 census ===
At the 2010 United States census, the city's population was 91,252, a 142% increase over the 2000 population of 37,640, and the population density was 1,940.9 people per square mile. The racial makeup of the city as of the 2010 census was 62.0% White, 16.4% African American, 0.5% Native American, 12.4% Asian, 0.04% Pacific Islander, 6.0% from some other race, and 2.7% two or more races. The Hispanic or Latino population, including persons of any race, was 20.5% of the total population, and non-Hispanic Whites made up 48.8%. By 2010, the city became ethnically and racially majority minority. At least 62 languages are spoken in Pearland public schools.

=== 2000 census ===
At the census of 2000, 37,640 people, 13,192 households, and 10,659 families resided in the city. The population density was 957.0 inhabitants per square mile (369.5/km^{2}). The 13,922 housing units had an average density of 354.0 units per square mile (136.7 units/km^{2}). The median income for a household in the city as of 2000 was $64,156, and for a family was $70,748 (these figures had risen to $83,706 and $92,096, respectively, as of a 2007 estimate). Males had a median income of $49,359 versus $34,570 for females. The per capita income for the city was $26,306. About 3.4% of families and 4.7% of the population were below the poverty line, including 6.1% of those under 18 and 3.5% of those 65 or over. The racial makeup of the city in 2000 was 82.6% White, 5.3% African American, 0.4% Native American, 3.6% Asian, 0.04% Pacific Islander, 6.1% some other race, and 1.8% from two or more races. Hispanics or Latinos of any race were 16.2% of the population.

=== Religion ===
Nearly 60% of the local population claimed religious affiliation as of 2020. Christianity is the largest religion in Pearland and the surrounding Greater Houston metropolitan area. Baptists formed the largest Christian group followed by the Catholic Church then the United Methodist Church. Large non-Christian religious groups included Islam, Judaism, and eastern religions including Hinduism and Buddhism.

St. Helen Catholic Church of the Roman Catholic Archdiocese of Galveston-Houston was established in 1966. Its previous church building had a capacity of 900, it was building a new sanctuary, with a capacity of 15,000 and a cost of $7 million. The expansion plans also added parking spaces and installed a bridal facility. The sanctuary construction was to begin fall 2002 and parking construction was to begin summer 2002. In 2002, 4,000 families were members, and in 2016 this had increased to 6,000, making it the largest Catholic church in Brazoria County. The property includes a K–8 school, St. Helen Catholic School. There is another Catholic parish with property in the Pearland city limits; St. Luke the Evangelist Church maintains the Cenacle Learning Center (CLC) in Pearland, while the main campus is in an unincorporated area in Harris County.

New Harvest Christian Fellowship, a nondenominational church established in 1999 with 60 members, was established by Keith Anderson. It first held services at Challenger Elementary School before moving into a 100-seat, 3,600-square-foot (330 m^{2}) worship center. On April 7, 2019, it was to convert the previous sanctuary into a youth ministry building and to open a new sanctuary. It is affiliated with the Southern Baptist Convention.

Shadycrest Baptist Church's previous sanctuary had a capacity around 270–275. By 2011, it was having a new 24,000-square-foot (2,200 m^{2}) sanctuary built. The expected cost was $4,700,000.

New Hope Church, an independent Christian church, started in Pearland in 1989 with 100 in attendance. As of 2022, the church had grown to five campuses with over 10,000 worshippers.

Chabad Pearland Jewish Center is the first Jewish center of worship in Pearland, established by Yossi and Esty Zaklikofsky in 2009. In addition to Pearland, it also serves Alvin and Friendswood.

== Economy ==
=== Workforce and industry ===
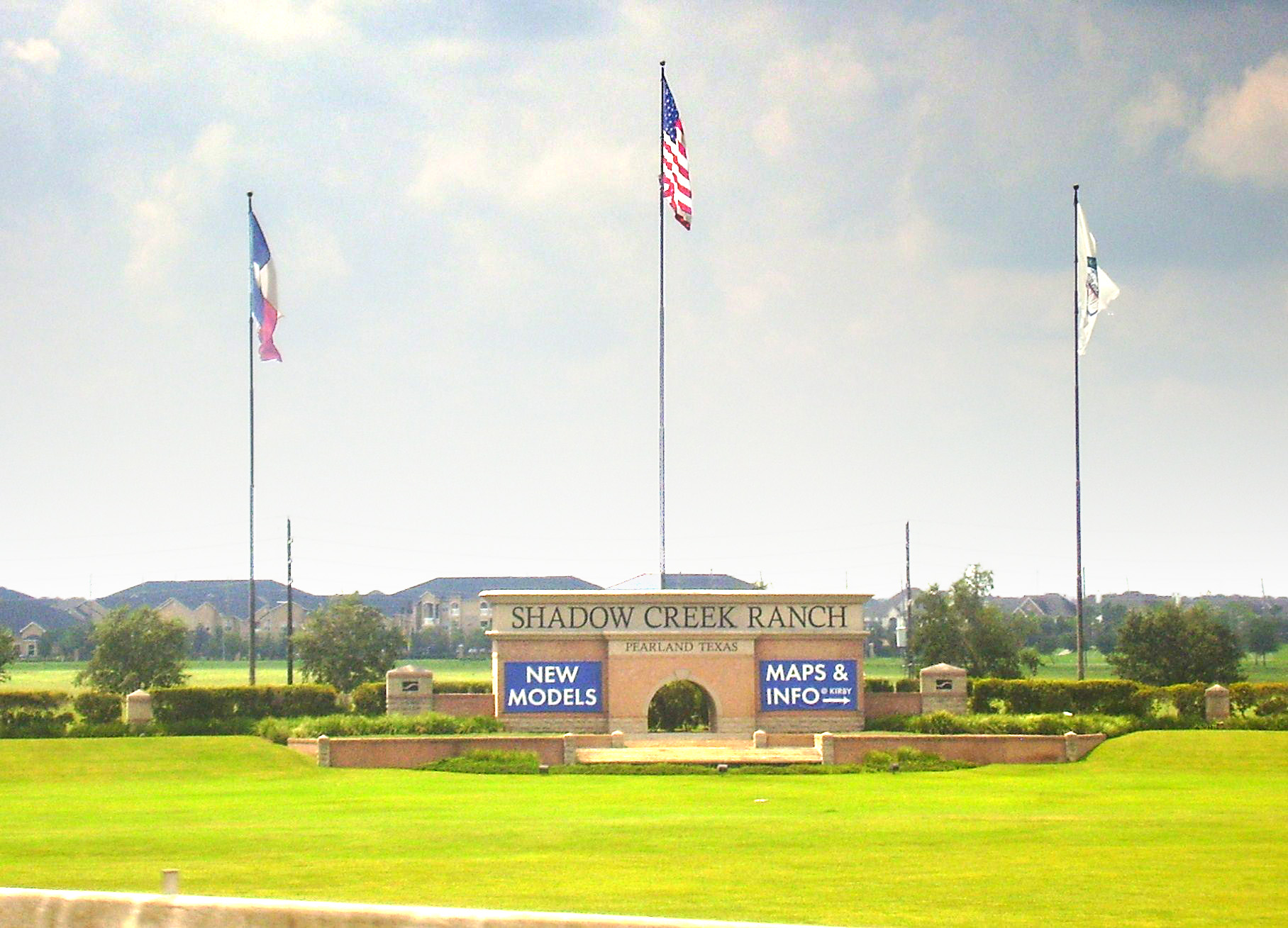
500 Shadow Creek Ranch

Pearland's labor force and job base grew substantially with its population growth. The number of jobs in the community grew from 9,169 in 2000 to 17,552 in 2008. The total labor force that resides in the community increased from approximately 20,000 in 2000 to 45,368 in 2010. A majority of the community's labor force commutes daily into the Texas Medical Center and other employment centers in the region. Pearland also has many people employed by NASA at the Lyndon B. Johnson Space Center.

Pearland's economy in the 2010s has helped increase its healthcare and health-related workforce. Kelsey-Seybold Clinic's new 170,000-square-foot (16,000 m^{2}) administrative office building in Shadow Creek Ranch was expected to open in the fall of 2013, with 800 employees. This follows two other medical manufacturing facilities: Cardiovascular Systems, which opened in 2010, and Merit Medical Systems, which began construction in 2011. The Merit project, 118,000 square feet (11,000 m^{2}), provides facilities for 220 research and development employees. By 2020, 50% of the city's economy relies on healthcare equipment manufacturing or medical research.

Other employers are a reflection of Pearland's suburban economy, with the vast majority of it retail.

According to its 2020 Comprehensive Financial Report, the top employers in Pearland were:

Rank	Employer	Number of employees
1	Pearland Independent School District	2,766
2	Kelsey Seybold Clinic	863
3	City of Pearland	853
4	Alvin Independent School District	785
5	Memorial Hermann Pearland Hospital	450
6	Lonza Group	444
7	Merit Medical Industries	360
8	HCA (Pearland Medical Center)	300
9	Dover Corporation	220
10	Third Coast Chemicals	200

=== Retail and entertainment ===
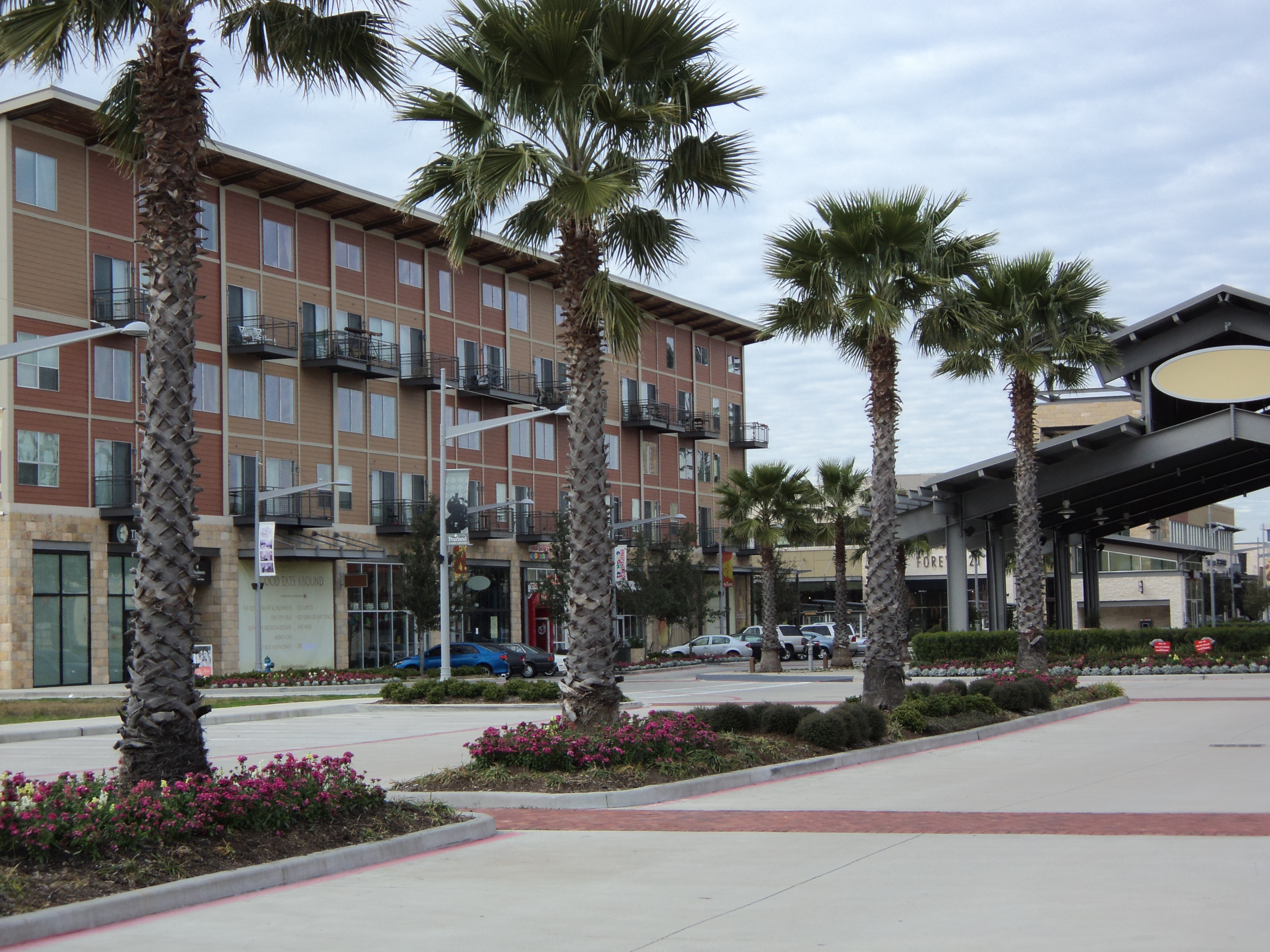
Town Center streetscape

Pearland was one of two Texas cities to average double-digit growth in retail sales from 2004 to 2009, and its retail market was the state's fastest growing over the five-year periods ending 2009, 2010, and 2011. Prominent mixed-use lifestyle and shopping complexes service residents with national retailers and dining establishments.

- Pearland Town Center – 1,100,000-square-foot (100,000 m^{2}) lifestyle center opened in July 2008.
- Shadow Creek Town Center – 640,265-square-foot (59,482.6 m^{2}) retail and dining center
- The Spectrum District – proposed developments include urban residential, office, and retail projects
- Silverlake Village Shopping Center
- The Crossing @ 288
- Shadow Creek Market Place

=== Healthcare ===
- Memorial Hermann Pearland
- Pearland Medical Center
- Reserve at SCR – Kelsey-Seybold, Memorial Herman and HCA
- St. Luke's Emergency Center
- Texas Children's Pediatrics – Pearland's first free charity clinic named SEVA Clinic. The nonprofit serves as a walk-in clinic for primary-care cases, such as diabetes, hypertension, and other nonemergency cases. SEVA Clinic is housed inside the facilities of another local nonprofit serving the city named the Pearland Neighborhood Center, and is located at 2335 N. Texas Avenue, Pearland, TX 77581.

Since 2015, "Wobble before you Gobble", Pearland's largest Annual Health Fair, is hosted by the local community. Founded by a local primary-care physician Dr Vishalakshmi Batchu, this health fair happens around the second or third week of November at Pearland Town Center. The event showcases several large and small healthcare facilities. Free health checkups, screenings, vaccinations, procedures, and nutrition and lifestyle information, are offered at the fair. Various fine arts clubs from local schools participate in the fair and showcase their talent in forms of singing, dancing, workouts, skits, and exercises. Several workout specialists offer workout sessions, including zumba, salsa, Bollywood, yoga, and many more formats. The event is organized by residents of Pearland.

== Government and infrastructure ==
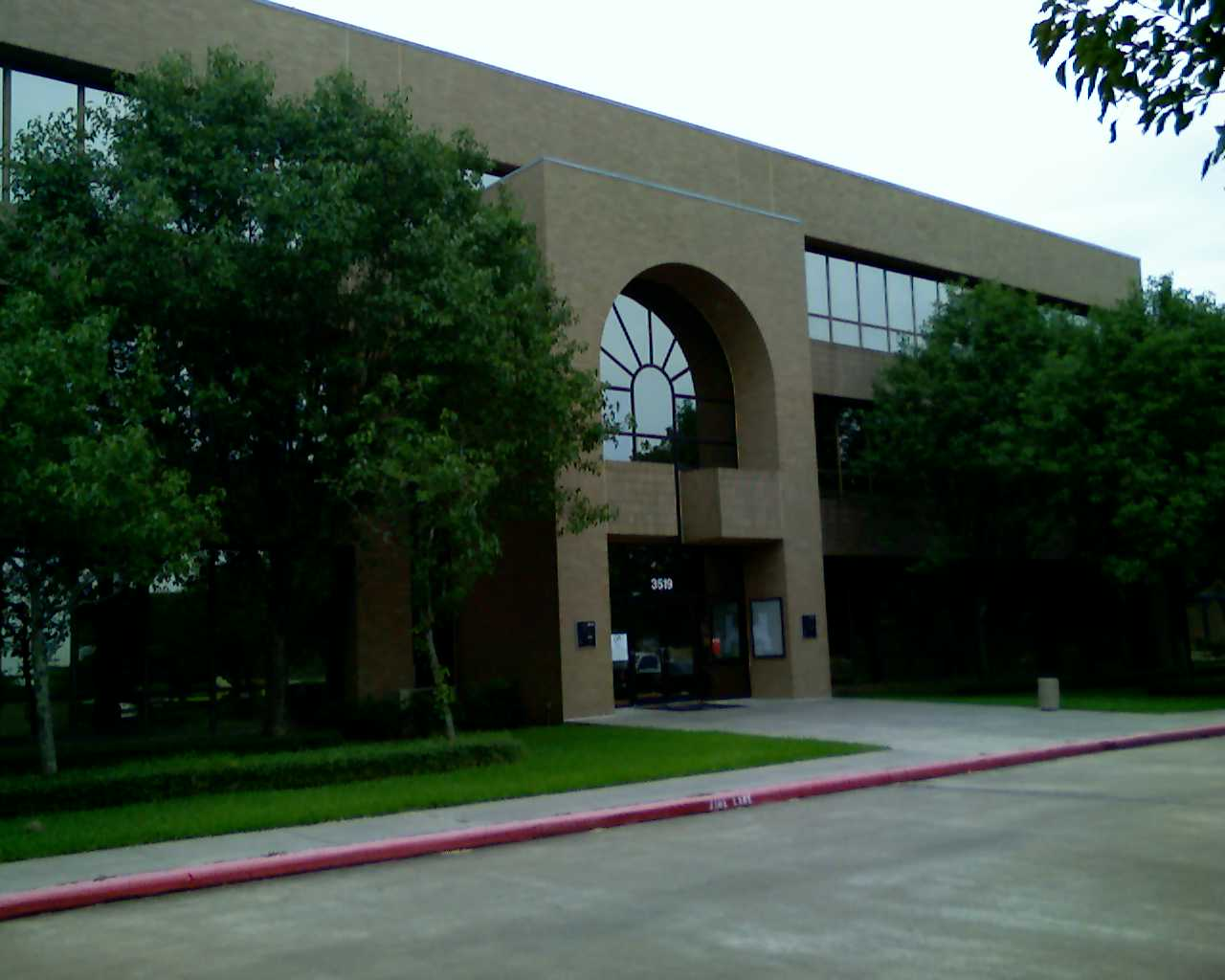
Pearland City Hall

The mayor is Quentin Wiltz.

The eastern portion of the city is represented in the Congress in the 22nd District by Republican Troy Nehls, elected in 2020. The western portion of the city is represented in the 9th district by Democrat Al Green.

Harris Health System (formerly Harris County Hospital District) designated Strawberry Health Center in Pasadena for ZIP code 77089 (Harris County Pearland). The nearest public hospital is Ben Taub General Hospital in the Texas Medical Center. Fort Bend County does not have a hospital district. OakBend Medical Center serves as the county's charity hospital which the county contracts with.

The animal shelter, Shari D. Coleman Animal Shelter & Adoption Center, was scheduled to open in April 2022. A referendum in 2019 approved the $9,940,000 bond to have it built.

=== Previous mayors ===
- E.T. Gibbons, 1959-1964
- John G. Kegley, 1965-1966
- Lloyd C. Hawkins, 1966-1967
- D.R. Keller, 1968-1972
- Carlton McComb, 1973-1977
- Tom Reid, 1978-1990, 1993-2020
- Todd McMahon, 1990-1993
- Kevin Cole, 2020–2026
- Quentin Wiltz, 2026-Present

== Education ==
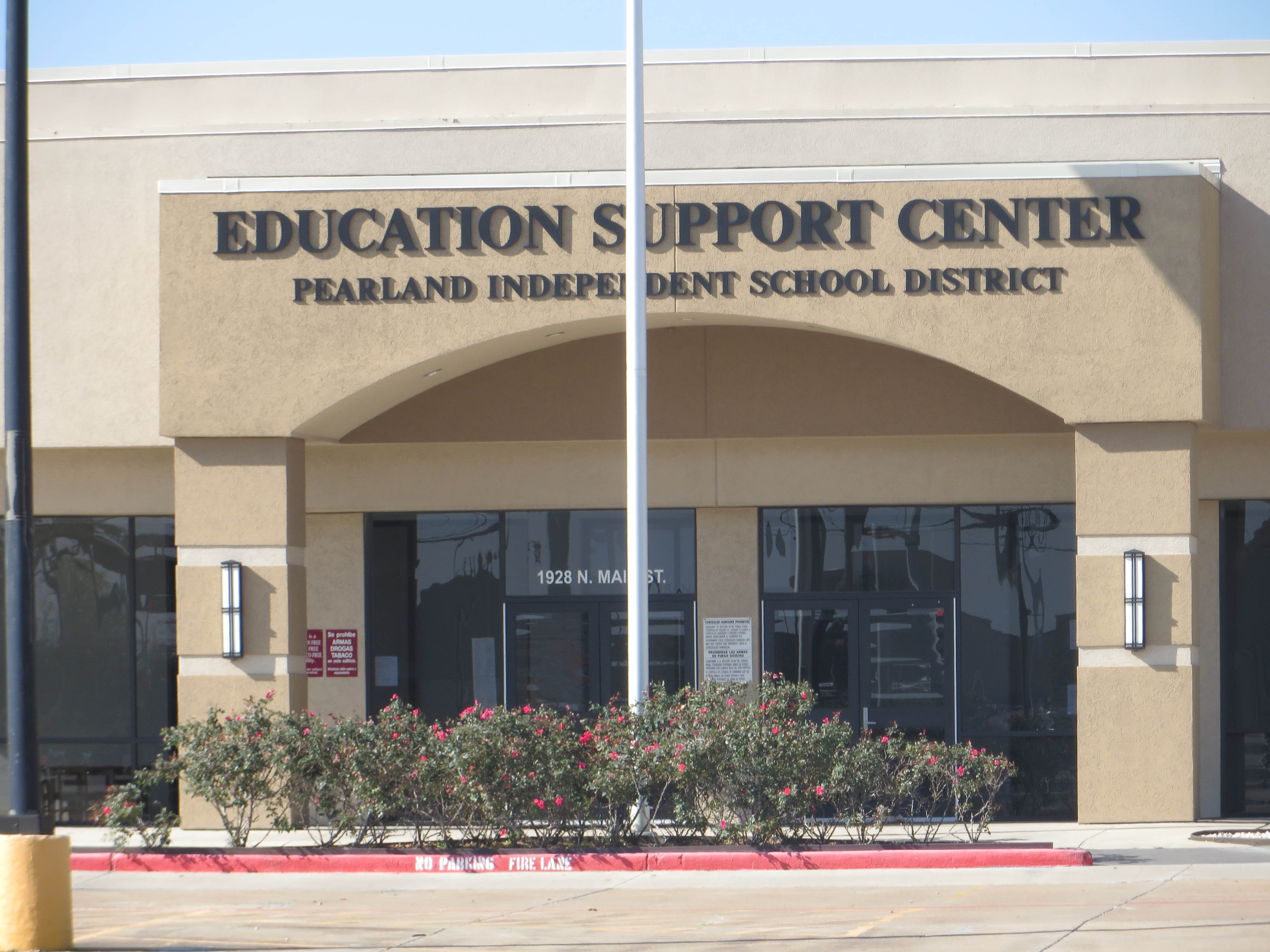
The Education Support Center, the headquarters of Pearland ISD

=== Primary and secondary schools ===
==== Public ====
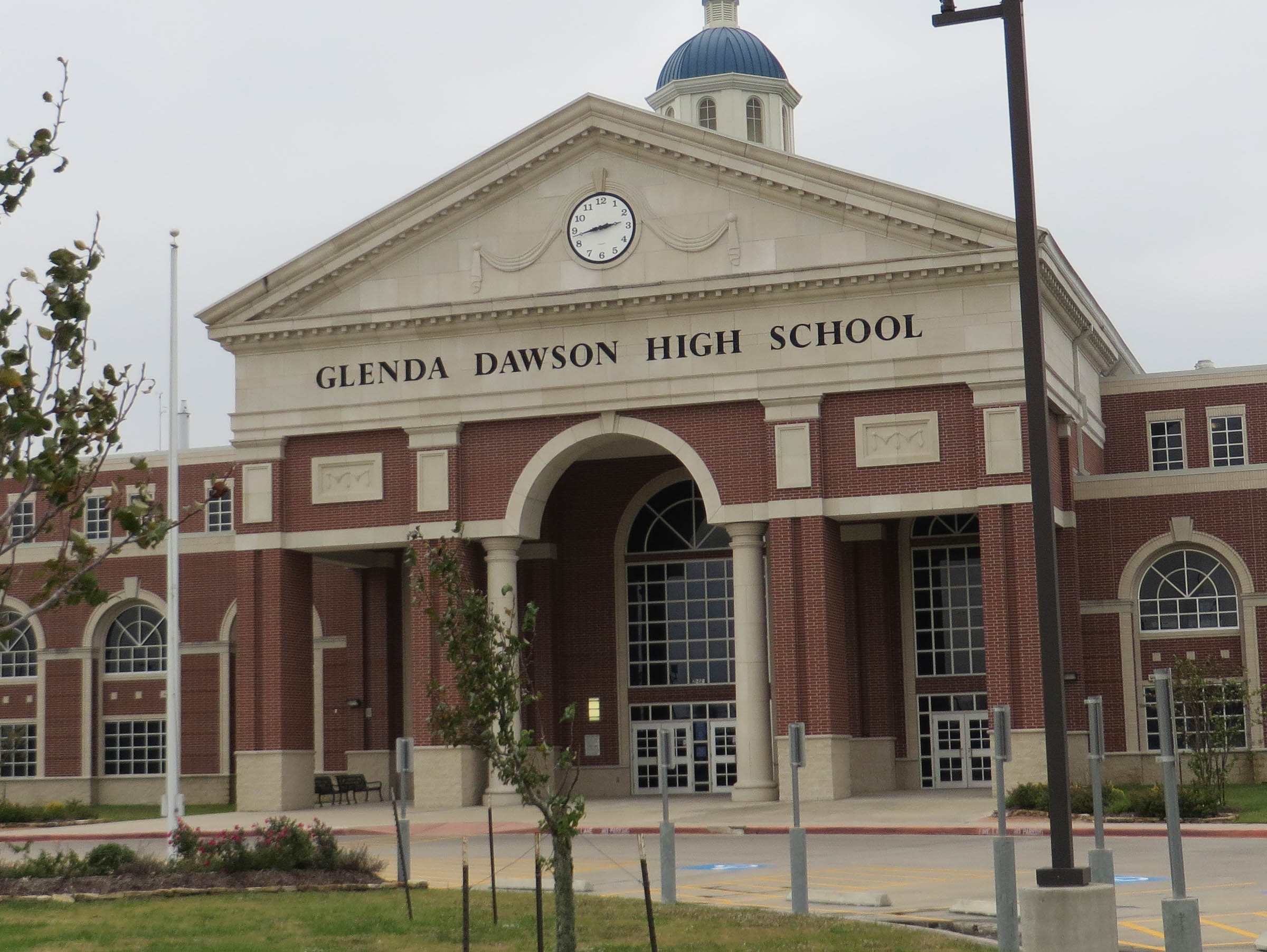
Glenda Dawson High School

Most of Pearland is a part of the Pearland Independent School District. Other portions of Pearland are part of Alvin Independent School District (including most of Shadow Creek Ranch), Fort Bend Independent School District (including some of Shadow Creek Ranch), Clear Creek Independent School District, Houston Independent School District, and Pasadena Independent School District.

- All schools in Pearland ISD, including Pearland High School and Glenda Dawson High School, serve the Pearland ISD portion of Pearland.
- The Alvin ISD portion is served by several elementary and middle schools as well as Shadow Creek High School (in Pearland) and Manvel High School (in Manvel).
- Most of the Fort Bend ISD portion is zoned to schools in Houston: Blue Ridge Elementary School, McAuliffe Middle School, and Willowridge High School. A small area is zoned to schools in Missouri City: Parks Elementary School, Lake Olympia Middle School, and Hightower High School.
- South Belt Elementary School of Pasadena ISD is in the Pearland city limits. Some of the Pasadena ISD portion is served by Moore Elementary School and the rest is served by South Belt Elementary School. One part is served by Morris Middle School and Beverly Hills Intermediate while the other is served by Melillo Middle School and Thompson Intermediate School. All Pasadena ISD residents in Pearland are zoned to Dobie High School (in Houston).
- The Clear Creek ISD portion is served by Weber Elementary School, Westbrook Intermediate School, and Clear Brook High School, all in unincorporated Harris County.
- The Houston ISD portion is served by Almeda Elementary School, Lawson Middle School (formerly Dowling Middle School), and Worthing High School (all in Houston).

==== Private ====
- St. Helen Catholic School, a K–8 Roman Catholic School operated by the Roman Catholic Archdiocese of Galveston-Houston.
  - Located on the grounds of St. Helen Catholic Church, it previously had 25,000 square feet (2,300 m^{2}) of space, but by 2019 its space increased to 75,000 square feet (7,000 m^{2}) due to an expansion. As of 2019 it had 400 students.
- The Eagle Heights Christian Academy is operated by the First Baptist Church and is located in Pearland on Pearland Parkway. It offers grades Pre-K–12.
- Heritage Christian Academy is located in Pearland. First Christian Academy Pre-K–12th grade.
- The Montessori School of Downtown is also an option for children Infant through 5th grade, with two locations in Pearland.

As of 2017 Awty International School in Spring Branch, which includes the Houston area's French international school, provides bus services for students to and from Pearland, as does St. Thomas' Episcopal School near Meyerland, and Saint Thomas High School in central Houston.

=== Colleges and universities ===
The Pearland ISD and Alvin ISD portions are served by Alvin Community College (ACC); the Alvin ISD part is in ACC's taxation boundary.

The Pasadena ISD portion is served by San Jacinto College, and the Houston ISD and Fort Bend ISD parts are served by Houston Community College (HCC).

The University of Houston–Clear Lake (UHCL) has a satellite campus located within the city.

=== Public libraries ===
The Pearland Library at 3522 Liberty Drive is a part of the Brazoria County Library System. As of September 13, 2008, the library was closed for many months due to Hurricane Ike storm damage. It reopened in March 2009.

== Transportation ==
=== Metro Park and Ride ===
On December 5, 2011, the Metropolitan Transit Authority of Harris County purchased 15.26 acres (6.18 ha) of land near Hwy. 288 and FM 518 in the Pearland area for a future "Park and Ride" facility. Alan Parker Properties LP represented the seller, Carolyn and Frank Wenglar, in the $3.95 million land sale. Metro, which currently operates 29 Park and Rides throughout Harris County, said that the new facility would give Brazoria County residents another option for traveling to the Texas Medical Center and other downtown Houston destinations. The new facility was scheduled to begin operations in the fall of 2013, but property was given to the city in a cash swap. The city is exploring a private-run service or other uses for the property.

=== Airports ===
Two privately owned airports, Pearland Regional Airport and Skyway Manor Airport, are within the city limits. Both airports allow public use. The land with Pearland Regional Airport was annexed into the Pearland city limits in 2017.

The closest publicly owned airport is the Brazoria County Airport, located in an unincorporated area.

Commercial airline service is provided out of Houston from William P. Hobby Airport and George Bush Intercontinental Airport, both in Houston.

=== Freeway system ===
Pearland is served by State Highway 288 which connects the city to Houston. FM 518, locally known as Broadway, is the main east–west artery of the city. State Highway 35, locally called Main Street and known as Telephone Road, is the main north–south artery of the city. Given the spread out area, SH 288 serves the westernmost part of the city, while SH 35 serves the easternmost part as both connect Pearland to Houston (FM 865/Cullen Blvd also connects Houston as well in between). The Texas State Highway Beltway 8 (Sam Houston Tollway) services the northern part of Pearland. It is located adjacent to the northern Brazoria County and southeastern Harris County border. It also serves as one of the largest tollways in the Houston area.

== Notable people ==
- Joseph Gutheinz, retired NASA employee who investigated stolen and missing Moon rocks
- The 1980s punk and new wave band The Judy's
- Clay Hensley, Major League Baseball pitcher born, raised, and now resides in Pearland
- Kyle Kacal, member of the Texas House of Representatives from College Station since 2013; rancher in Brazos County
- Richard Machowicz, television personality and former Navy Seal
- Bunny Meyer, YouTube personality
- Thomas Morstead, NFL punter
- Joirdon Nicholas (born 1999), basketball player in the Israeli Basketball Premier League
- Normani, singer and former member of Fifth Harmony who moved to Pearland from New Orleans after Hurricane Katrina
- Alyah Chanelle Scott, actress
- Megan Thee Stallion, rapper and actress who graduated from Pearland High School in 2013
- Randy Weber, member of the United States Congress who was born in Pearland and resided there until 2012
- Fozzy Whittaker, retired NFL running back
- Connor Wong, MLB player for the Boston Red Sox

== Sister cities ==
Pearland's sister cities are:

- Markham, Ontario, Canada
- Matamoros, Tamaulipas, Mexico
- Lopez, Quezon, Philippines
- Palencia, Spain

== See also ==
- List of municipalities in Texas
