= Amsterdam, Texas =

Unincorporated community in Texas, US

Coordinates: 29.244810°N 95.235607°W

Amsterdam was an unincorporated community in Brazoria County, Texas, United States. Amsterdam is on Chocolate Bayou, 10 mi (16 km) east of Angleton in east central Brazoria County.

== History ==
A post office operated in Amsterdam from 1897 until 1905, after which mail was routed through Liverpool. The town shipped cotton to Galveston from area plantations and depended on water traffic in the 1890s. At its height, circa 1900, Amsterdam had a hotel and school. However, the Galveston hurricane of 1900 did considerable damage, and afterward the town failed to grow. State highway maps of 1936 showed only scattered dwellings at the townsite. By the 1970s, construction of a nearby chemical plant had increased the number of local residences, and 1988 state highway maps showed several buildings. There was a fire station located in the town, but this was closed down in the mid 1990s due to funding and lack of volunteers. In 2000, the population was 193.

As of 2011, the continued existence of this town has been questioned.

== Education ==
Amsterdam is within the Alvin Independent School District.
