= Alvin Independent School District =

School district in Texas, U.S.

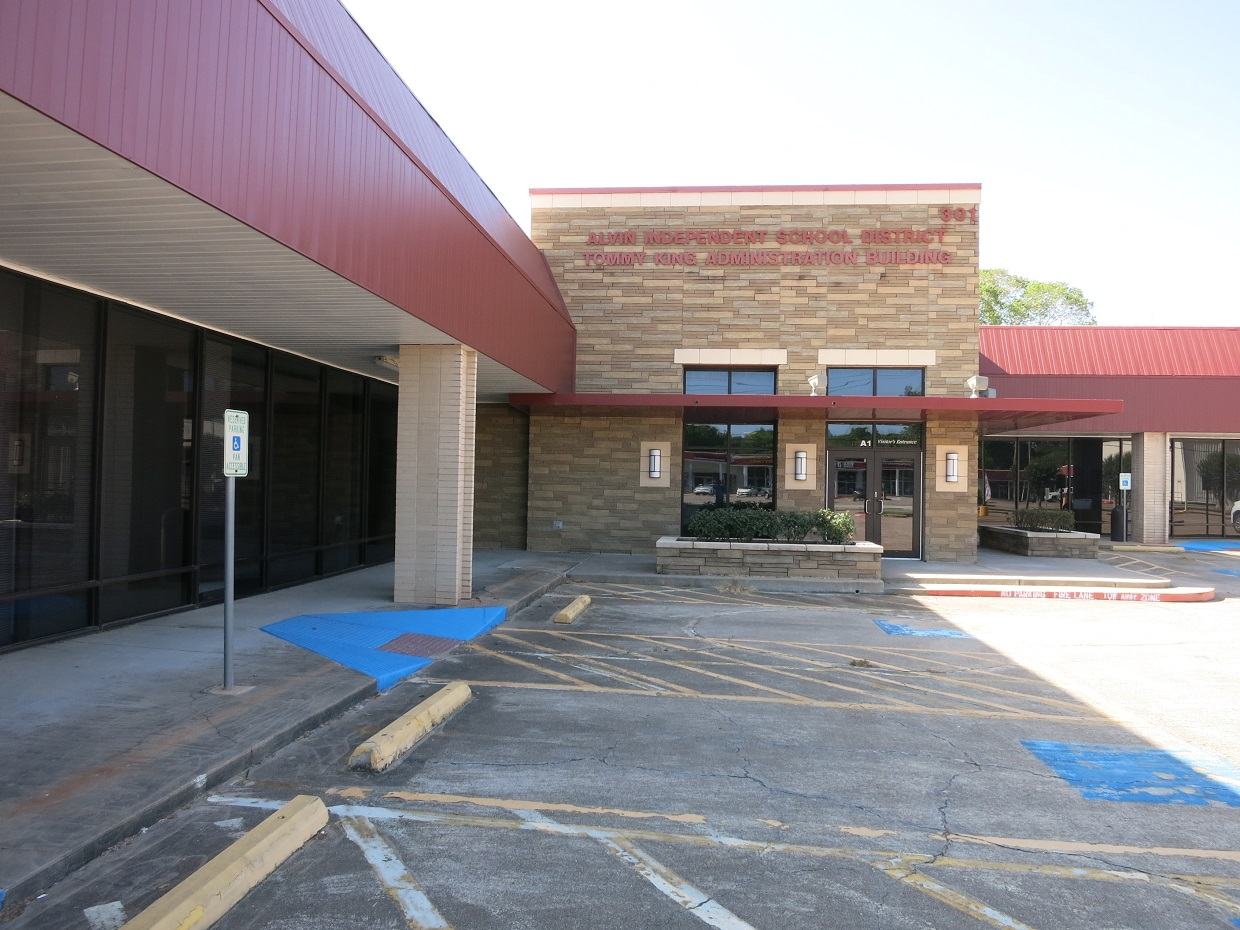
- Tommy King Administration Building

Address
- 301 E House St. Alvin, Texas; United States
- Coordinates: 29°25′9″N 95°14′29″W

District information
- Type: Independent school district
- Motto: "Every Student, Every Day"
- Grades: Pre-K–12
- Established: May 28, 1925
- Superintendent: Carol Nelson
- Schools: 35
- Budget: US$311,890,248
- NCES District ID: 4808090

Students and staff
- Students: 29,740 (2023–2024)
- Teachers: 1,905.89 (on an FTE basis)
- Staff: 1,737 (FTE) (2021–22)
- Student–teacher ratio: 15.60:1

Other information
- B (84/100) (2024-25)
- Website: www.alvinisd.net

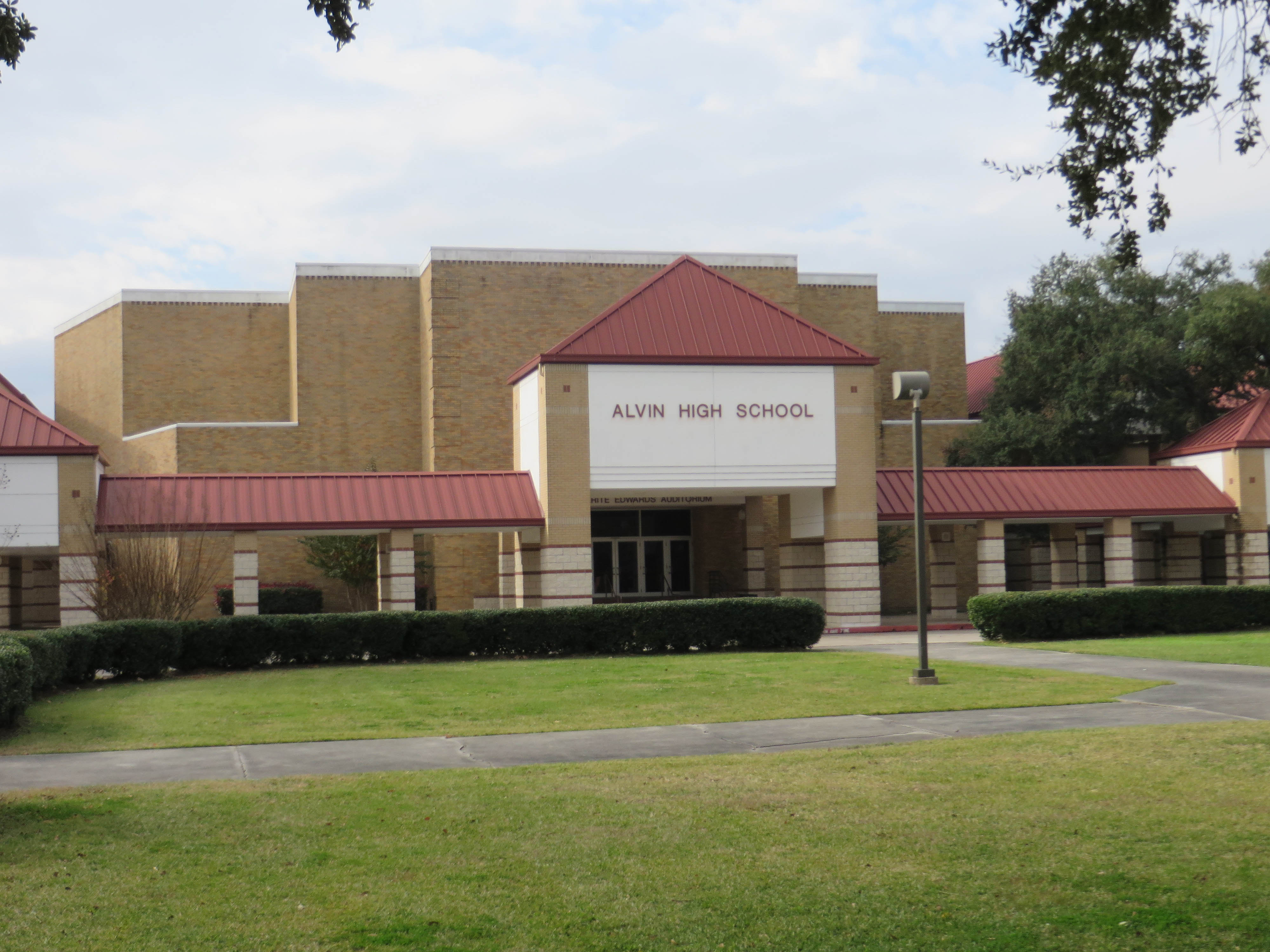
Alvin High School

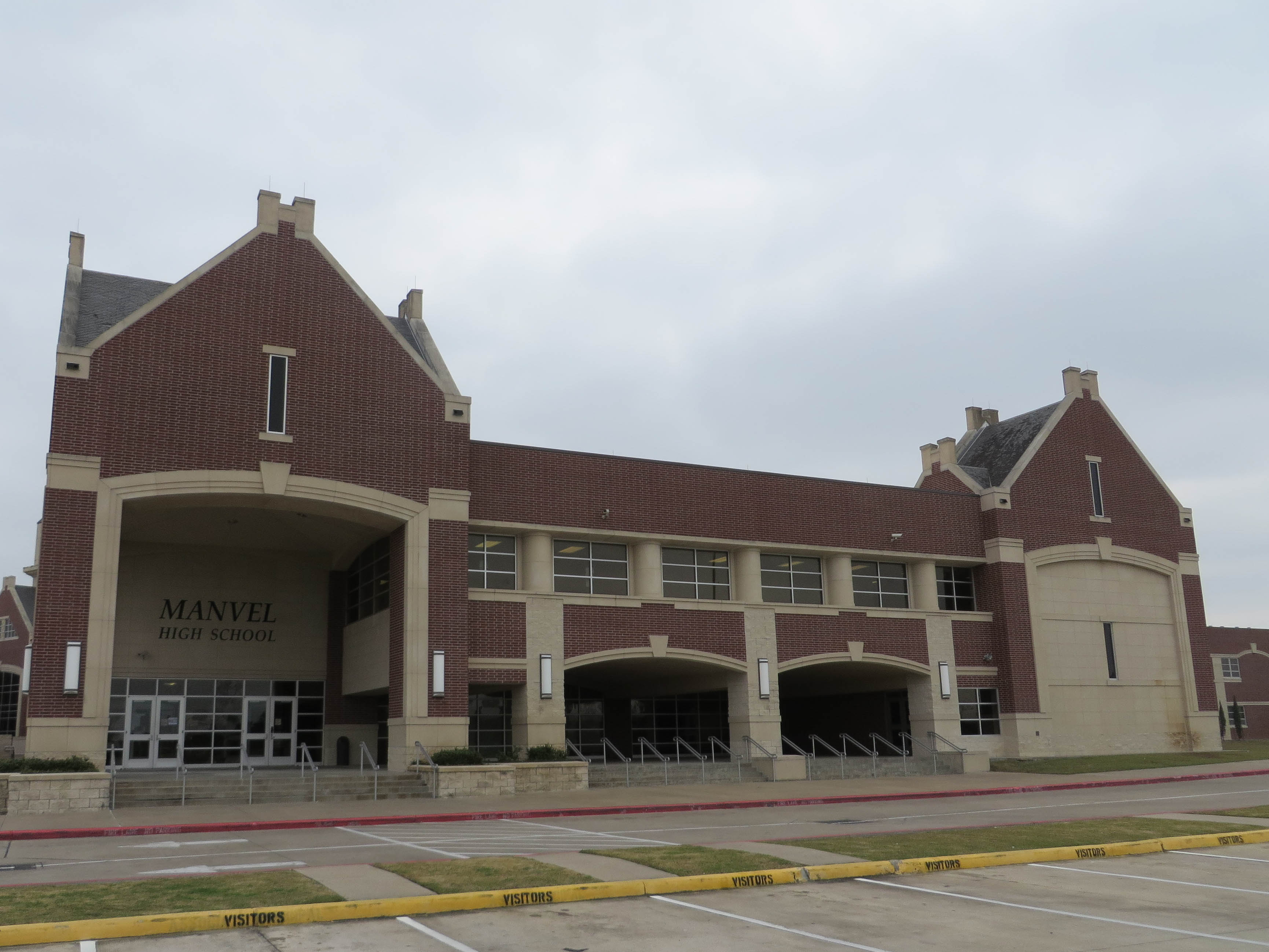
Manvel High School

Alvin Independent School District is a school district based in Alvin, Texas, U.S.

Alvin ISD is a large suburban school district south of Houston which includes the following areas: the majority of Alvin, Manvel, Hillcrest, Iowa Colony, Liverpool, and portions of Pearland. It also serves Amsterdam and some areas with Rosharon postal addresses. Alvin ISD serves Pearland city's rapidly growing western portion of the city including the new large master-planned communities of Shadow Creek Ranch, South Fork, and Southern Trails. Alvin ISD covers 252 square miles (650 km^{2}) of land.

== Finances ==
As of the 2020/21 school year, the appraised valuation of property in the district was $10,805,729,375. The Maintenance tax rate was $1.0052. The I&S Rate is .3925. The tax rate was $1.3977 per $100 of appraised valuation.

== Academic achievement ==
For the 2024-2025 school year, the school district received an overall rating of "B" from the Texas Education Agency. A school district in Texas can receive one of five possible grade ratings from the Texas Education Agency: A (the highest possible ranking), B, C, D, and F (the lowest possible ranking).

Historical district TEA accountability ratings

- 2011: Recognized
- 2010: Exemplary
- 2009: Recognized
- 2008: Recognized
- 2007: Academically Acceptable
- 2006: Academically Acceptable
- 2005: Academically Acceptable
- 2004: Recognized

== District Realignment ==
Beginning with the 2008–2009 school year, Alvin Independent School District was realigned the following way: Sister schools (Alvin Primary School/Alvin Elementary School; Stevenson Primary School/Walt Disney Elementary School; and Mark Twain Primary School/Longfellow Elementary School) became grades PK-2 and 3–5. All other elementary schools were changed to grades PK-5 with 6th grade being transitioned to the Junior High level across the district. The two alternative schools were not affected by this realignment.

In November 2010, a School Boundary Advisory Committee began work on a new plan to realign the school zones to better balance the student populations and accommodate a new elementary school opening in August 2011 and a new junior high opening in 2012.

== Campuses ==
=== High Schools (Grades 9th-12th) ===
Name	City	Year opened	Notes
Alvin High School	Alvin	1894	
Manvel High School	Manvel	2006	
Shadow Creek High School	Pearland	2016	
Iowa Colony High School	Iowa Colony	2022	

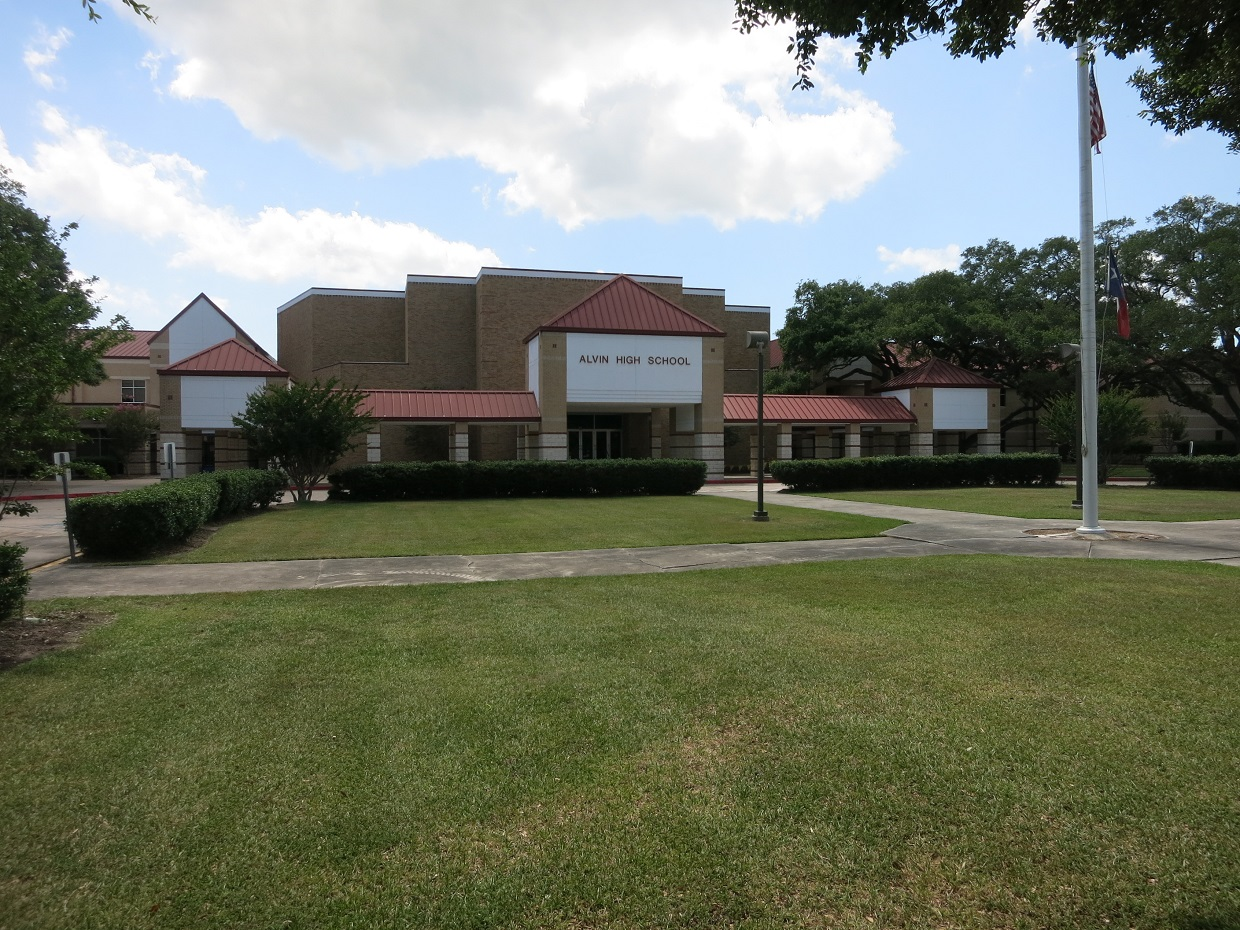
Alvin High School

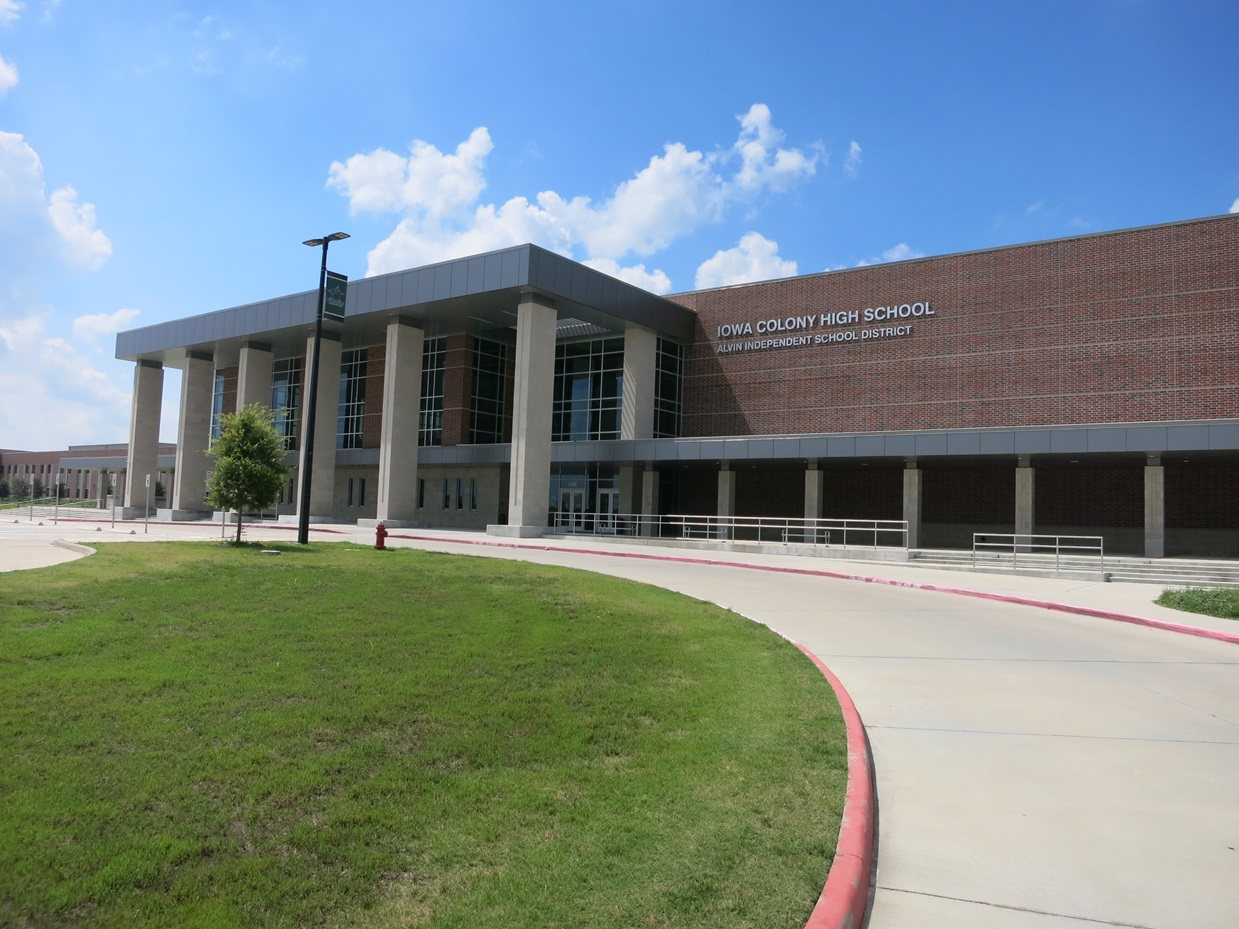
Iowa Colony High School

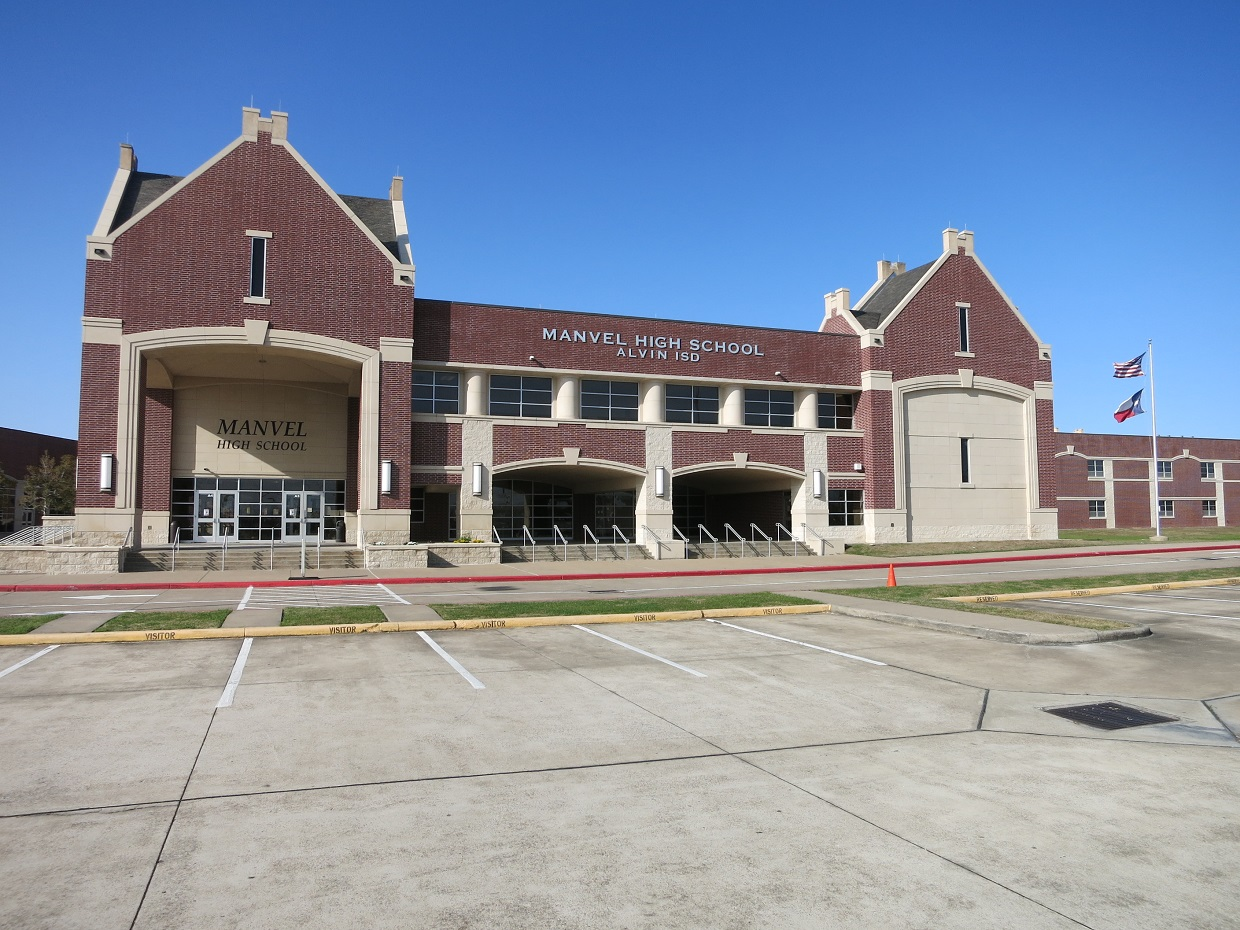
Manvel High School

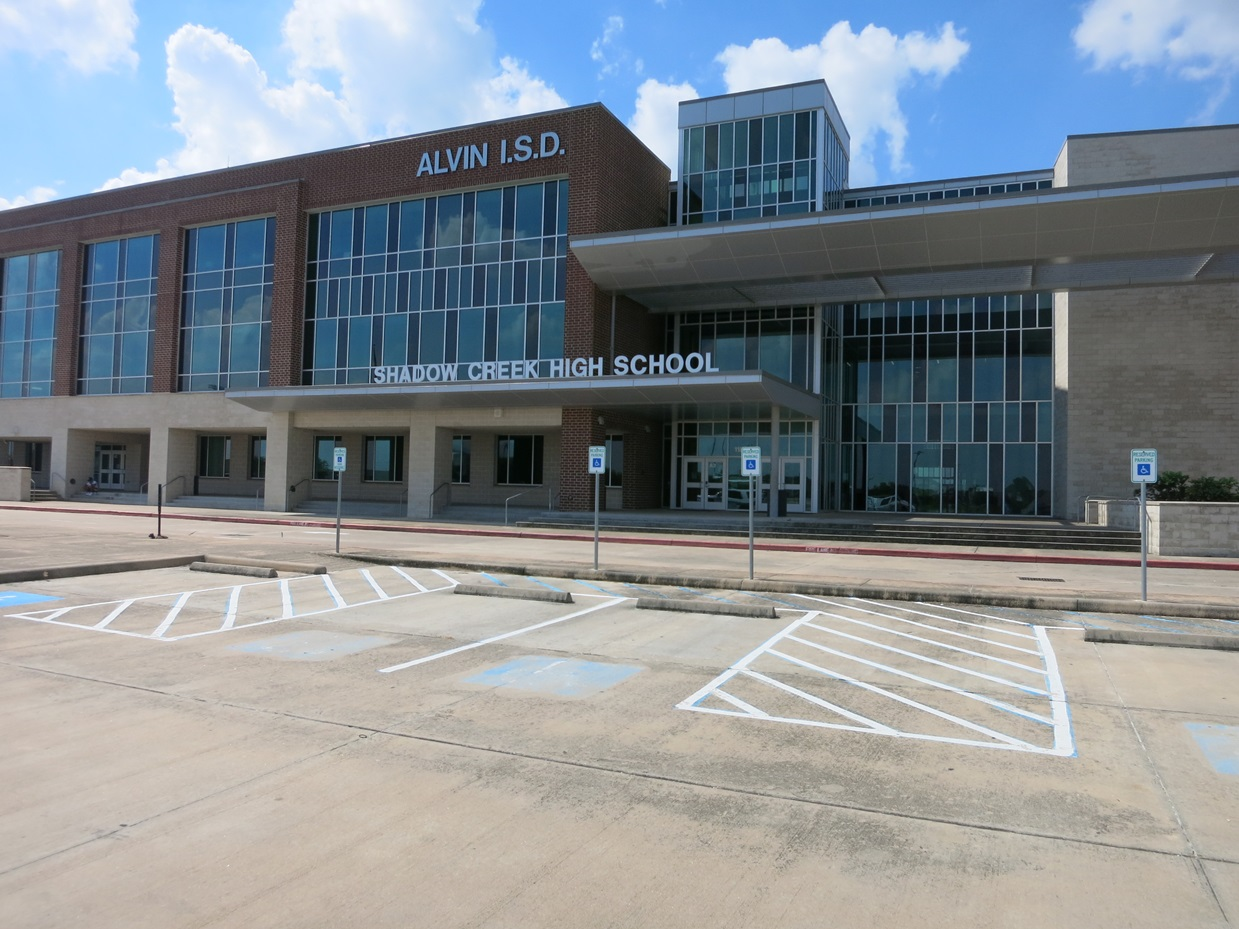
Shadow Creek High School

=== Junior High Schools (Grades 6th-8th) ===
Name	City	Year opened	Notes
Alvin Junior High School	Alvin	1968	
Fairview Junior High School	Alvin	2008	
Grace Ward Harby Junior High School	Alvin	2023	rebuilt Harby Junior High School (1980)
Manvel Junior High School	Manvel	2015	replaced Manvel Junior High School (1972)
Rodeo Palms Junior High School	Manvel	2012	
Nolan Ryan Junior High School	Pearland	2008	
Dr. Ronald E. McNair Junior High School	Pearland	2018	
Jackie Doucet Caffey Junior High School	Manvel	2021	
Iowa Colony Junior High School	Iowa Colony	2024	
New Junior High School	TBD	TBD	2024 Bond

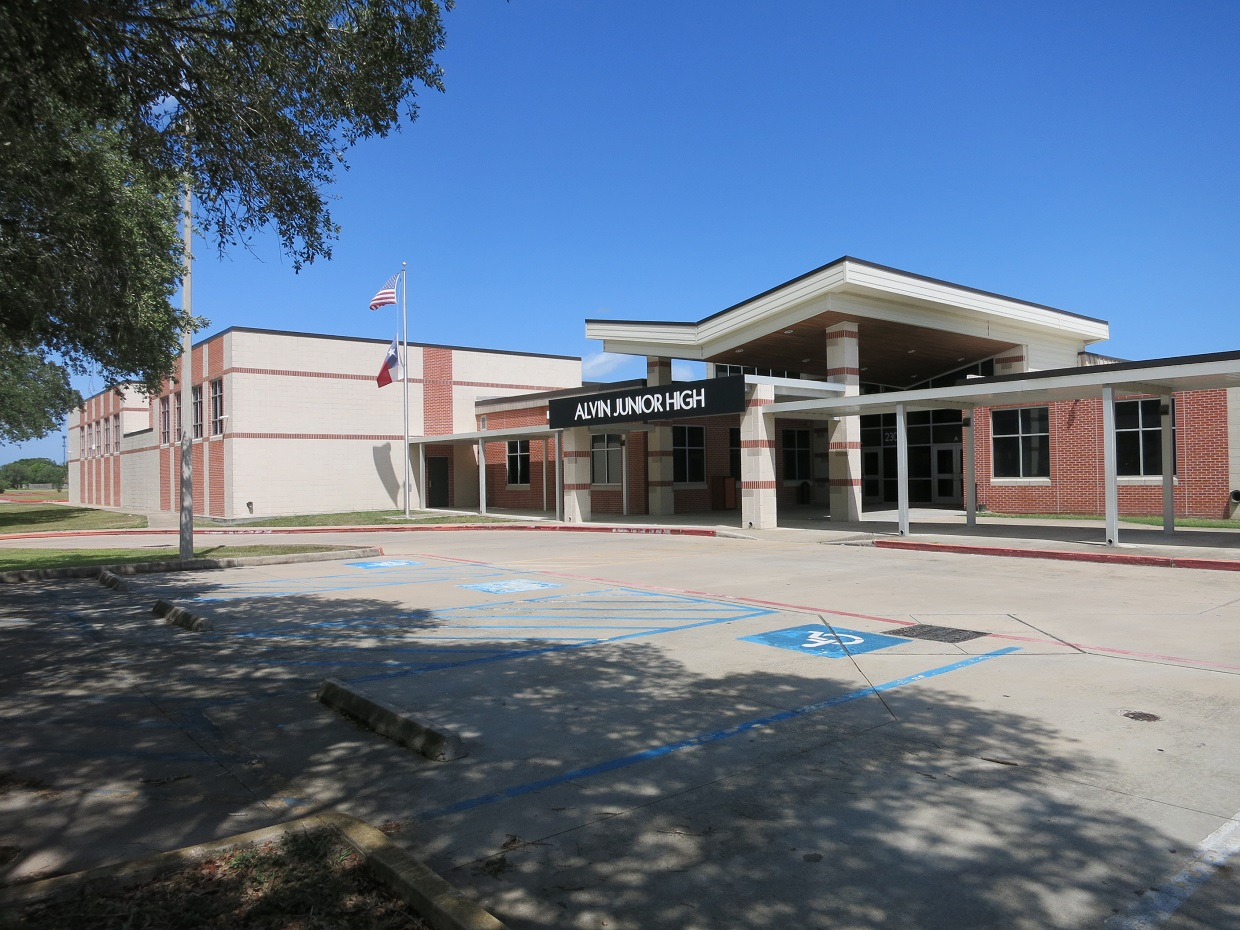
Alvin Junior High School

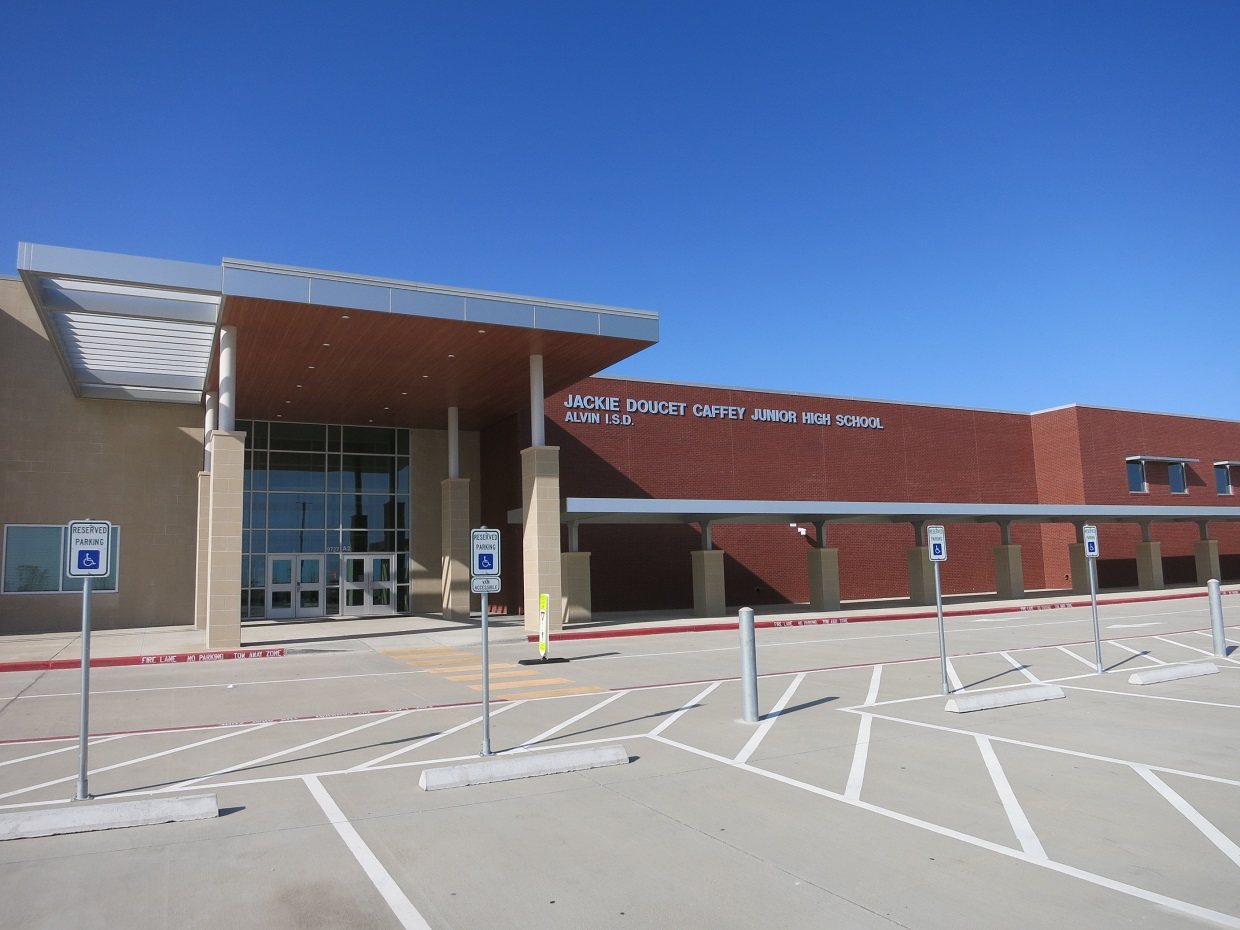
Jackie Doucet Caffey Junior High School

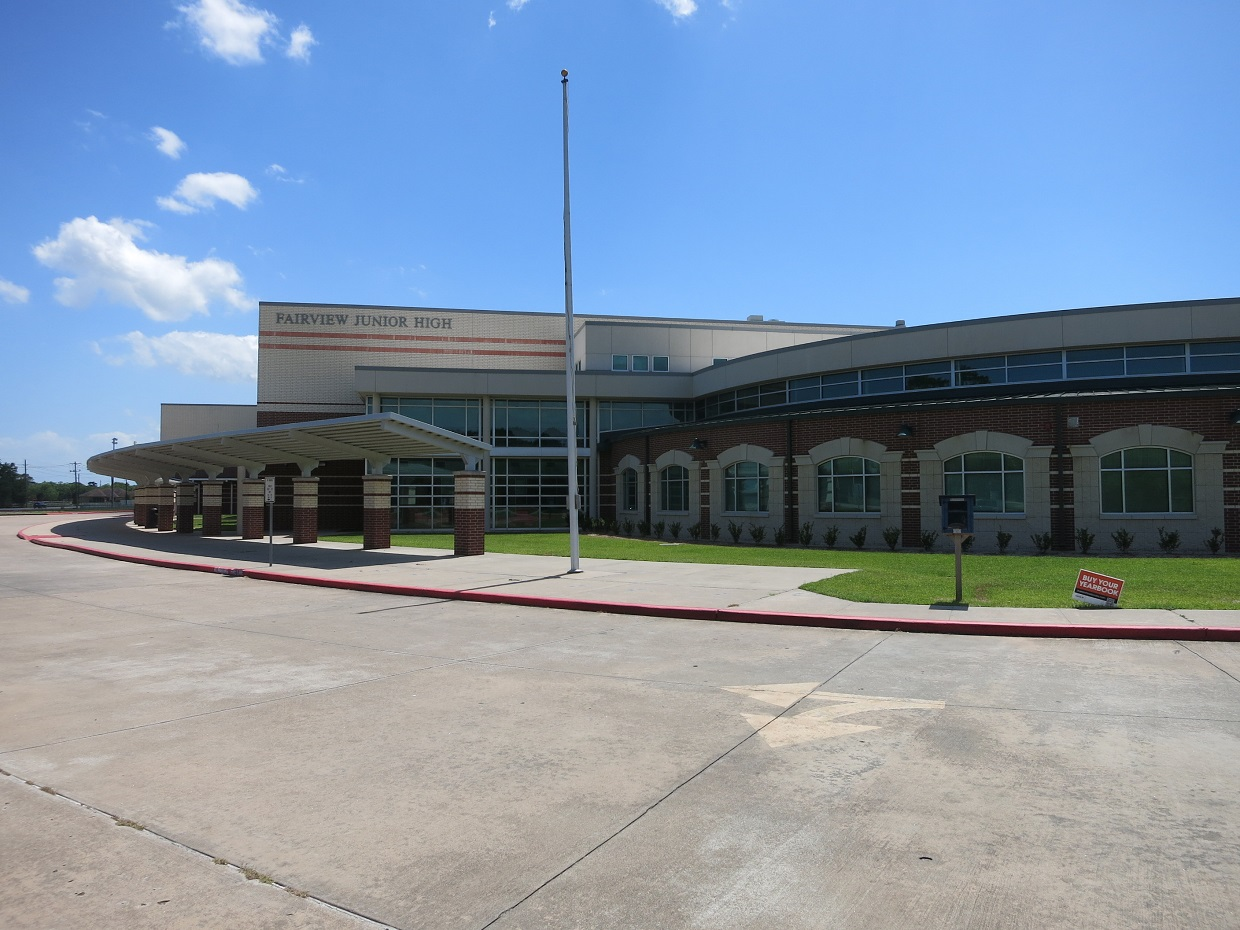
Fairview Junior High School

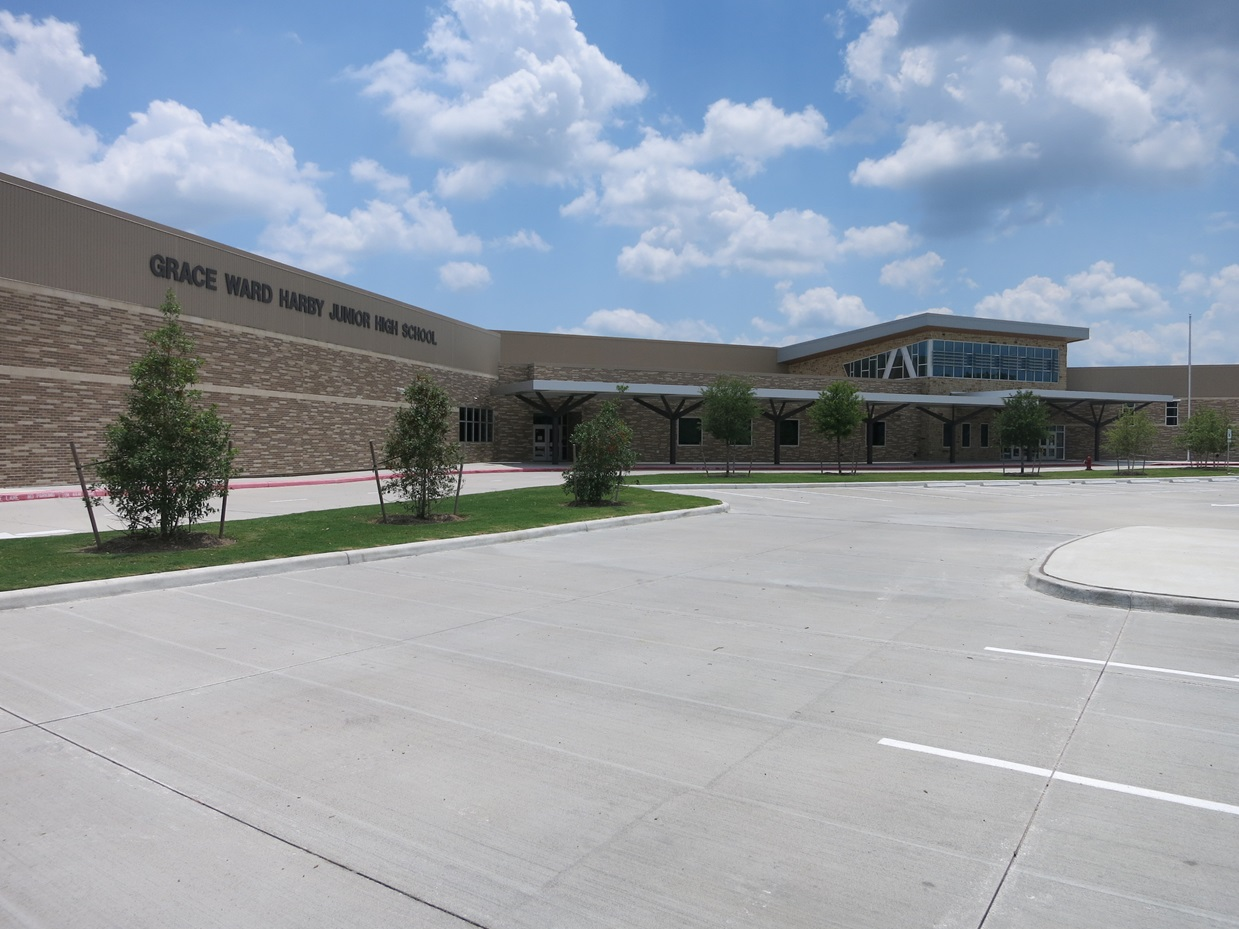
Grace Ward Harby Junior High School

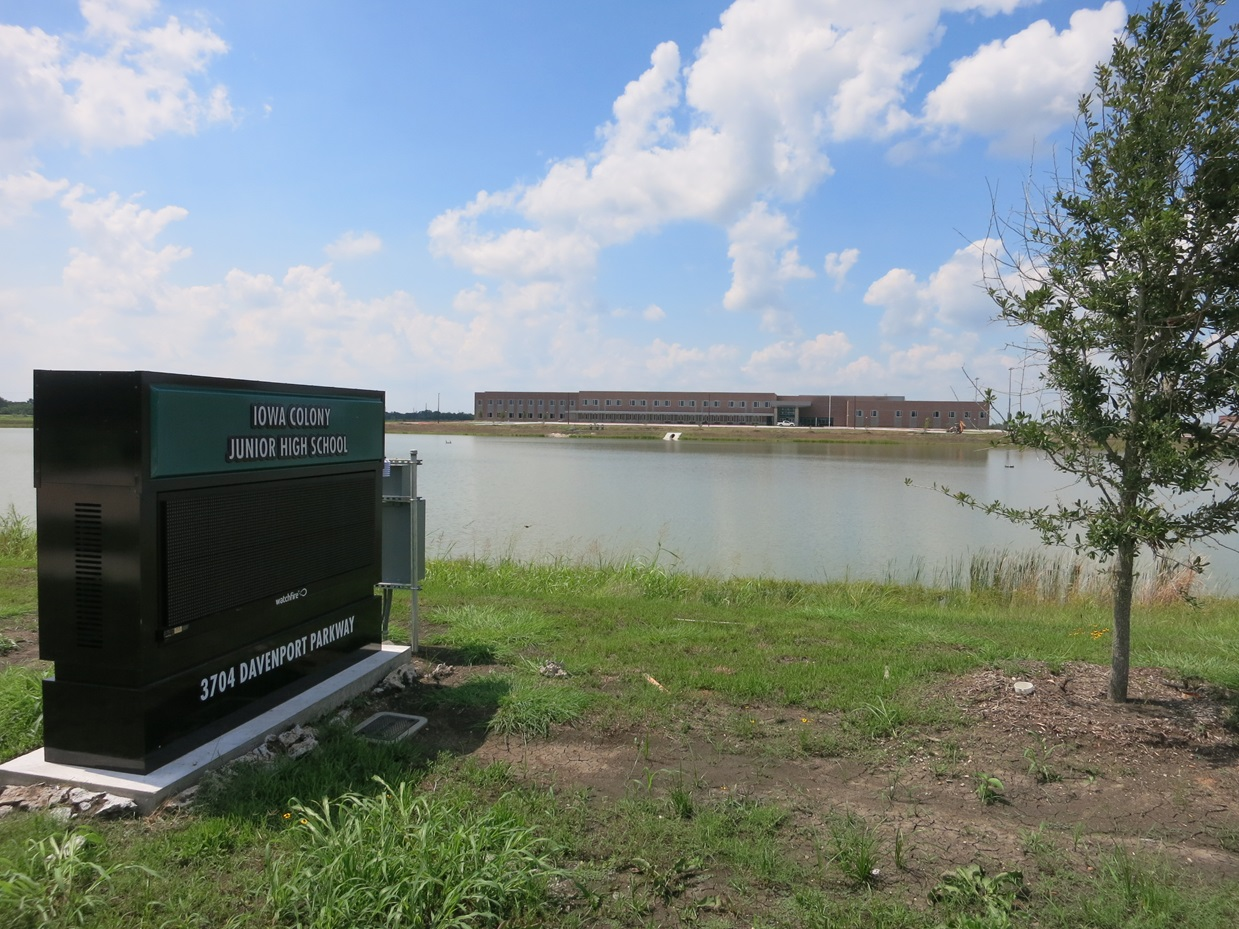
Iowa Colony Junior High School (under constr.)

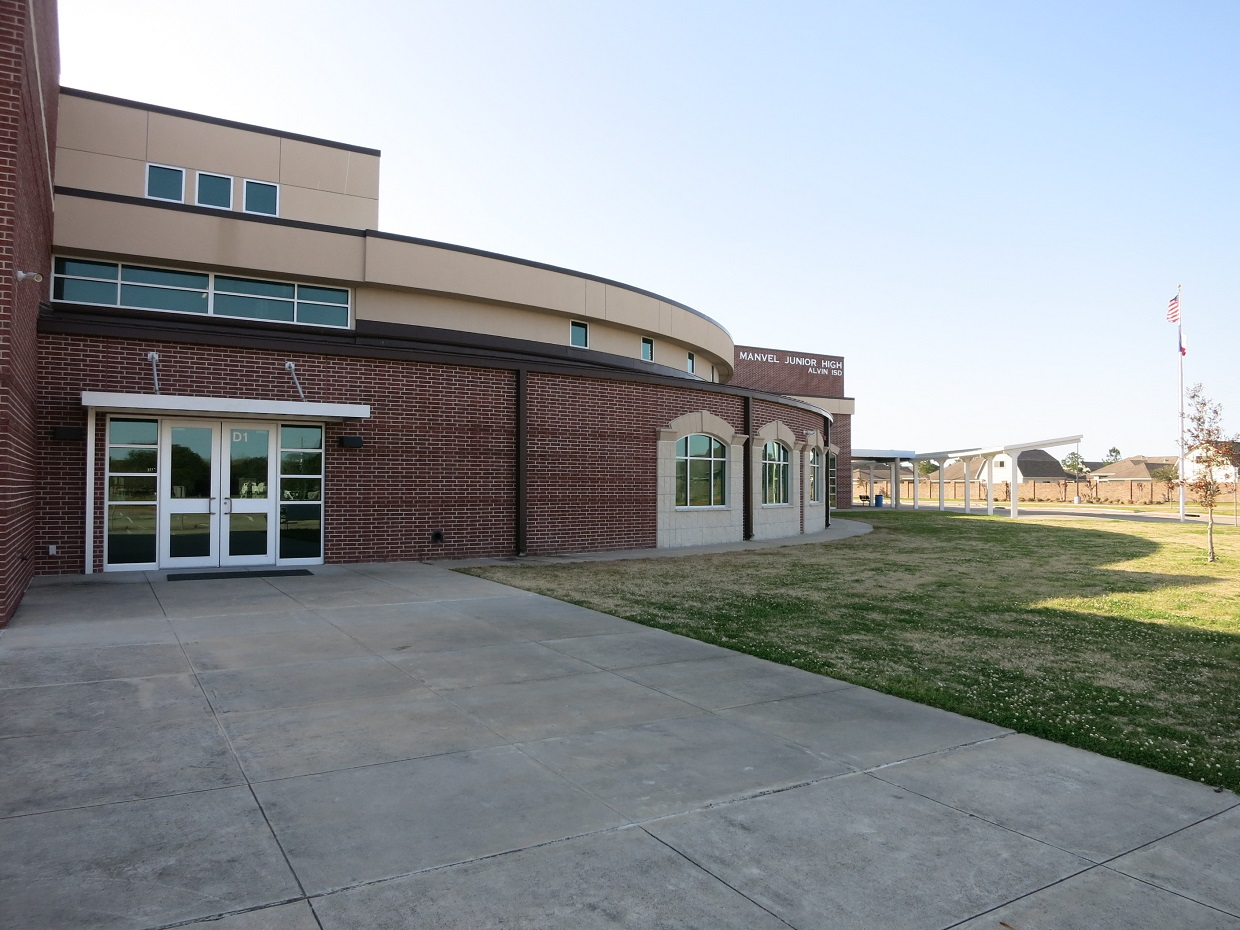
Manvel Junior High School

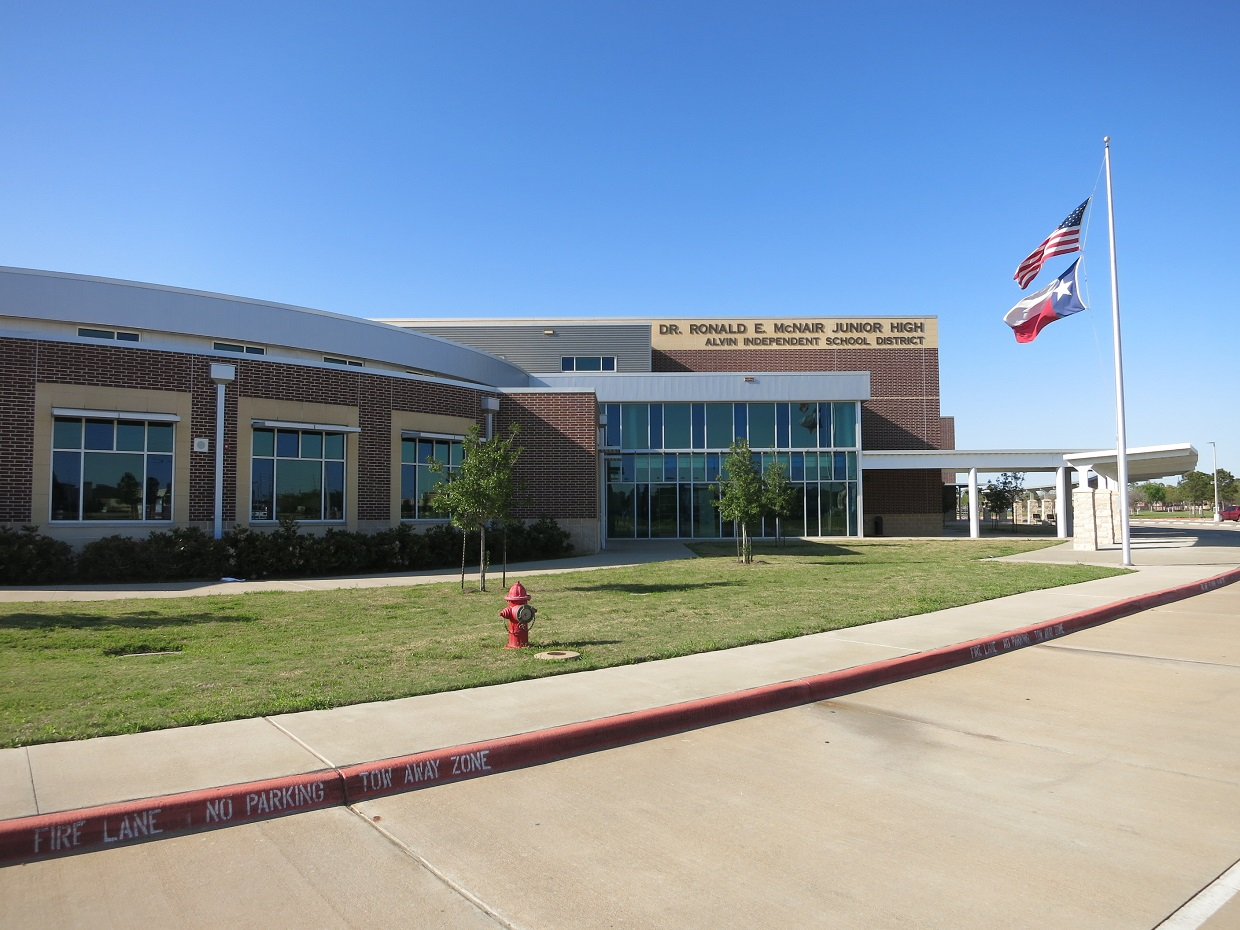
Dr. Ronald E. McNair Junior High School

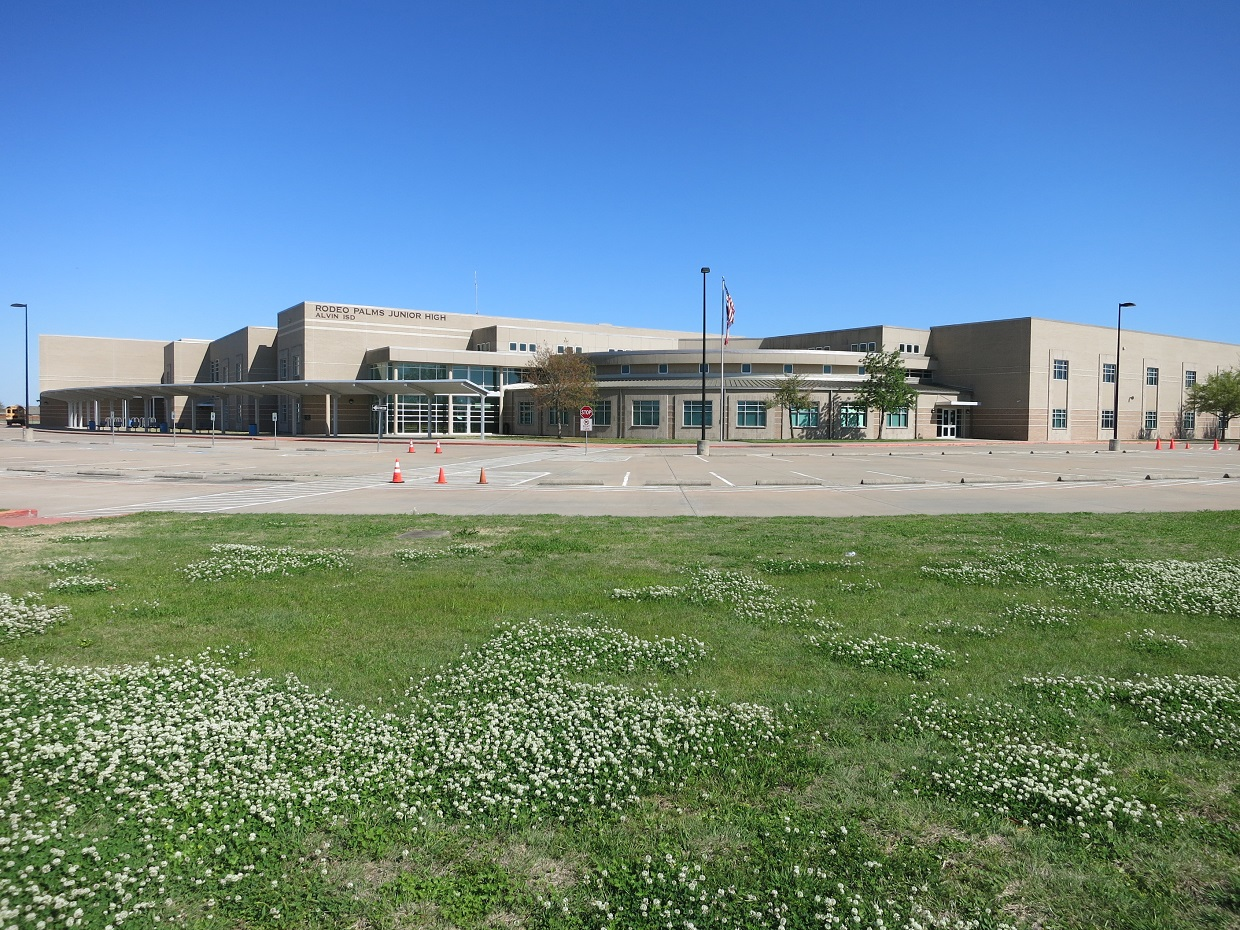
Rodeo Palms Junior High School

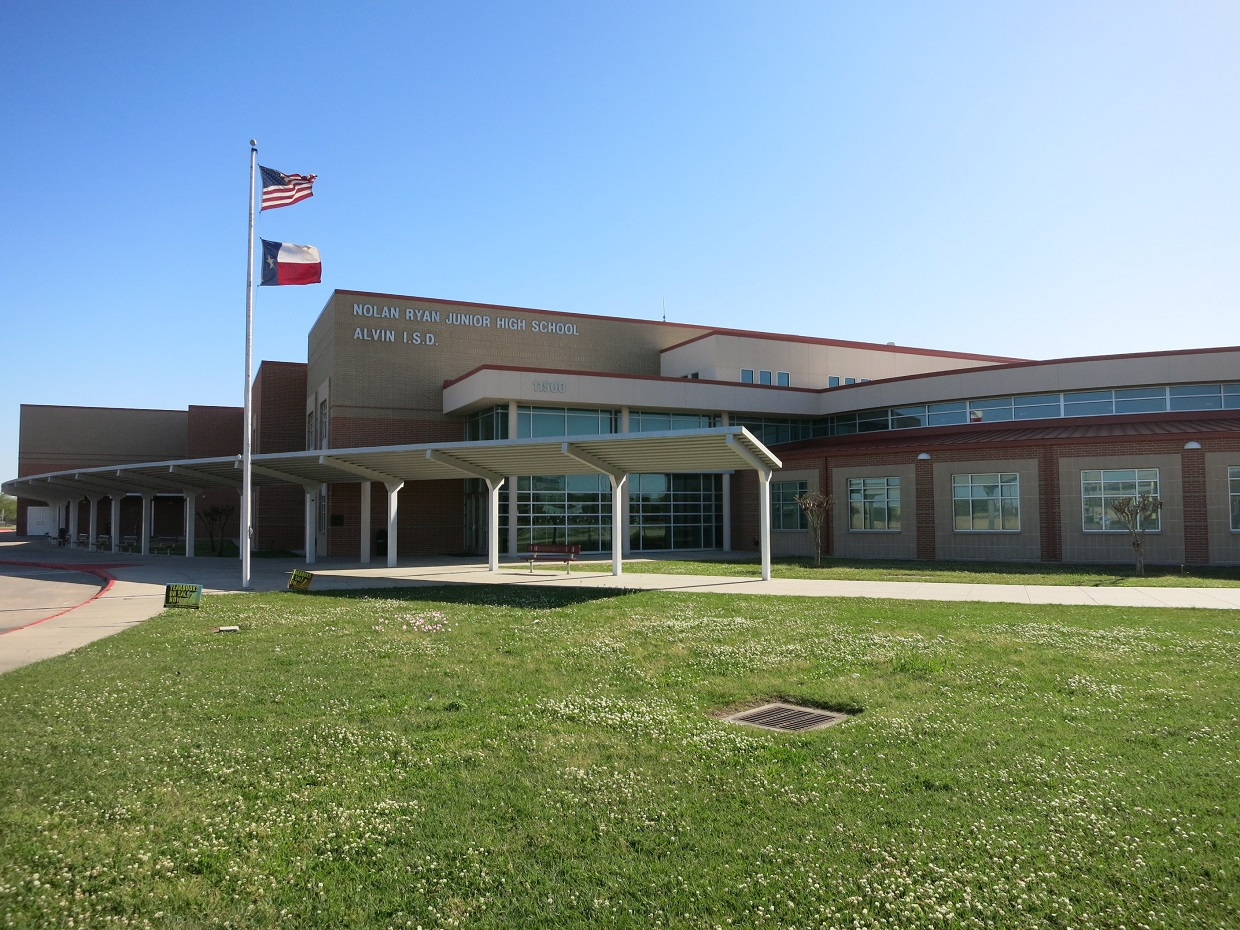
Nolan Ryan Junior High School

=== Elementary Schools (Grades PK-5th or Grades PK-2nd/3rd-5th) ===
Name	City	Year opened	Grades	Notes
Alvin Elementary School	Alvin	2024	PK-5	replaced Alvin Elementary (1974) and Alvin Primary (1979)
Golda Hood-Bobbie Case Elementary School	Alvin	1997	PK-5	
Shirley Dill Brothers Elementary School	Pearland	2017	PK-5	
Walt Disney Elementary School	Alvin	1979	3rd-5th	to be replaced by combined campus per 2024 bond
Dr. James "Red" Duke Elementary School	Manvel	2014	PK-5	
Bill Hasse Elementary School	Alvin	2016	PK-5	replaced Longfellow Elementary (1968)
Laura Ingalls Wilder Elementary School	Pearland	2007	PK-5	
Don Jeter Elementary School	Manvel	2002	PK-5	
Mary Burks Marek Elementary School	Pearland	2004	PK-5	
E.C. Mason Elementary School	Manvel	2021	PK-5	replaced original E.C. Mason Elementary School (1979).
Meridiana Elementary School	Iowa Colony	2016	PK-5	
Melba L. Passmore Elementary School	Alvin	1993	PK-5	
Savannah Lakes Elementary School	Rosharon	2008	PK-5	
Bob and Betty Nelson Elementary	Alvin	2019	PK-5	
Robert Louis Stevenson Primary School	Alvin	1974	PK-2nd	to be replaced by combined campus per 2024 bond
Mark Twain Elementary School	Alvin	2012	PK-5	replaced original Mark Twain Primary School (1964)
Glenn York Elementary School	Pearland	2011	PK-5	
Pomona Elementary School	Manvel	2017	PK-5	
Bel Nafegar Sanchez Elementary School	Rosharon	2019	PK-5	
Delbra Nichols-Wilma Mock Elementary School	Rosharon	2023	PK-5	
Barbara Bennett Elementary School	Manvel	2024	PK-5	
New Elementary School	TBD	TBD	PK-5	2024 Bond
New Elementary School	TBD	TBD	PK-5	2024 Bond

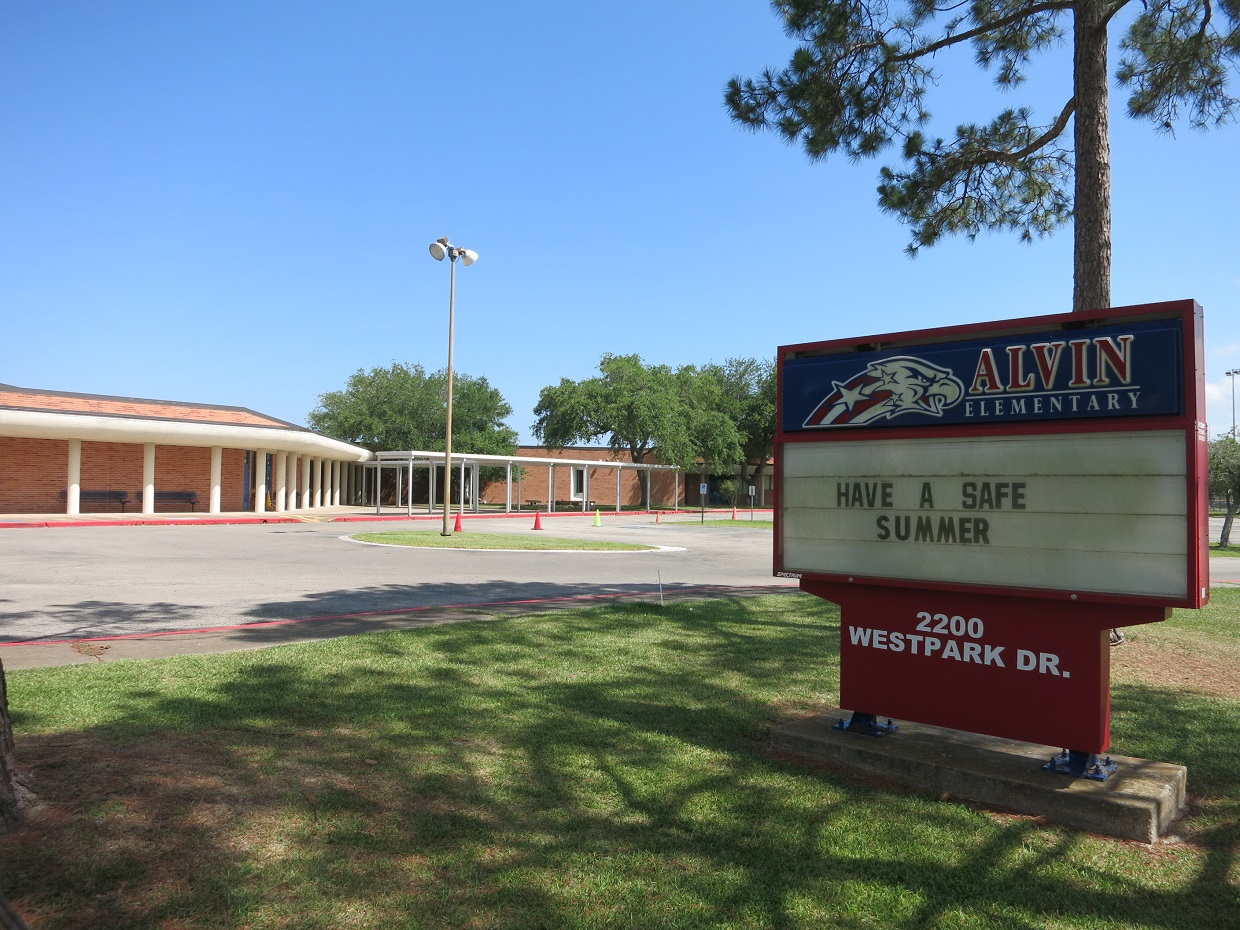
Alvin Elementary School

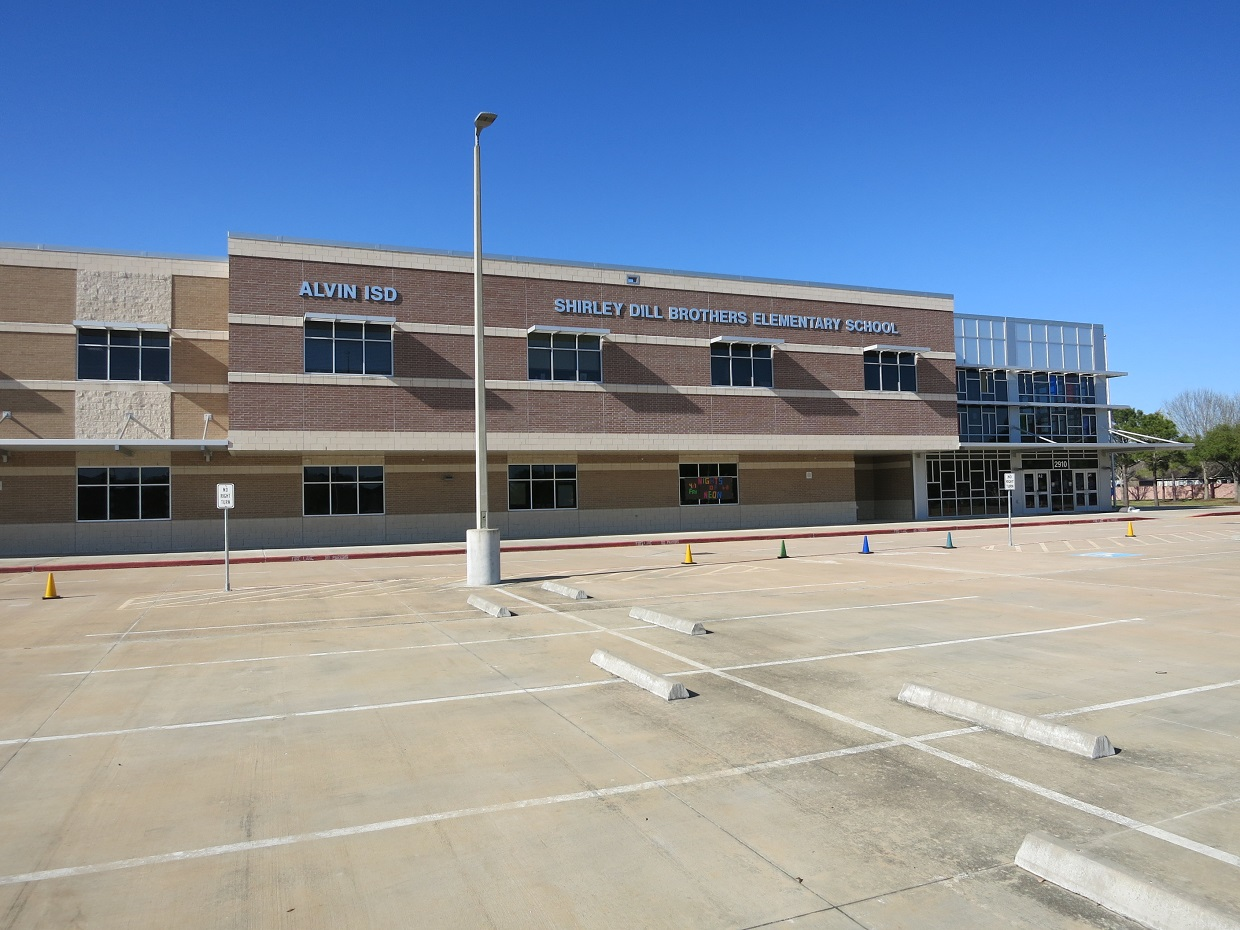
Shirley Dill Brothers Elementary School

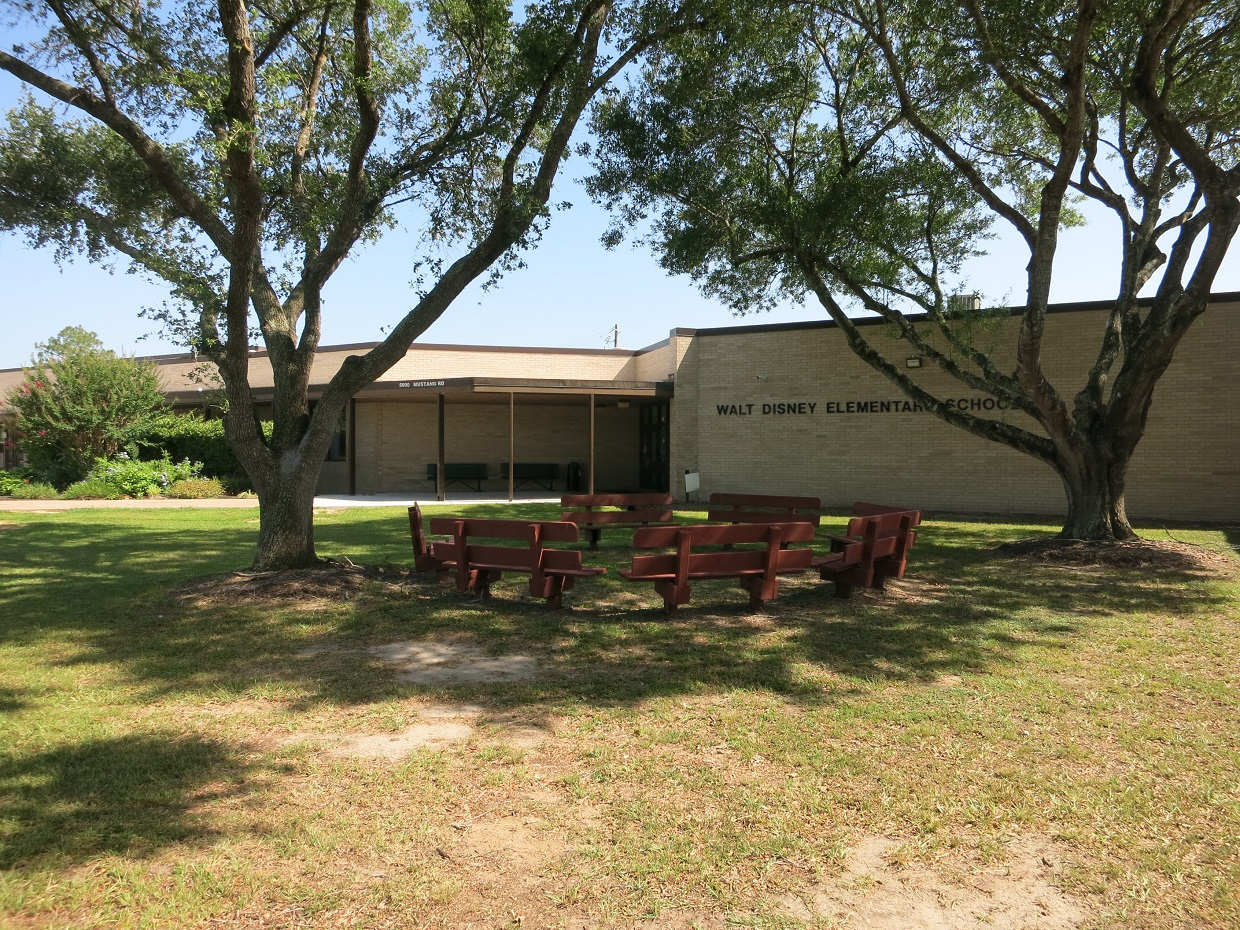
Walt Disney Elementary School

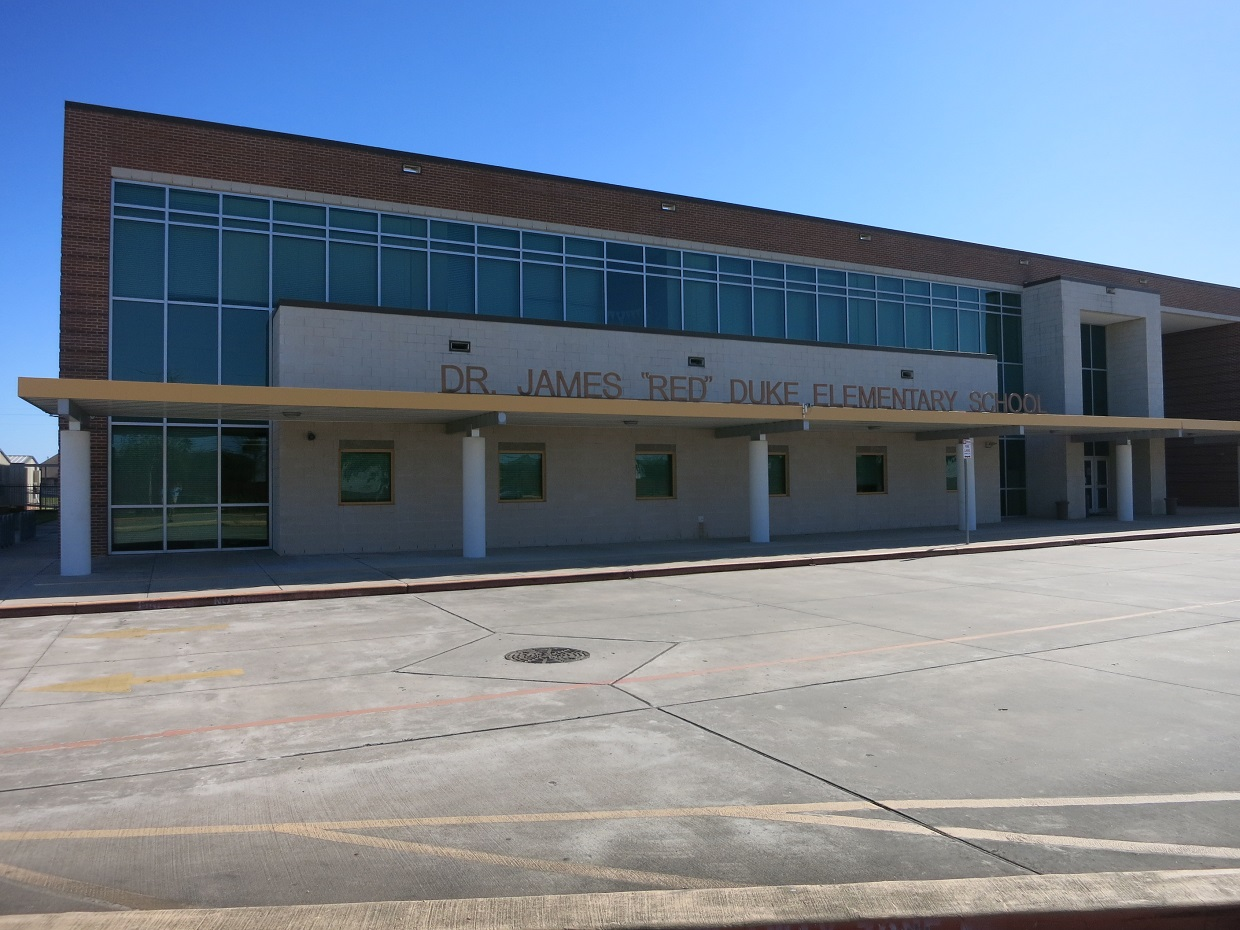
Dr. James "Red" Duke Elementary School

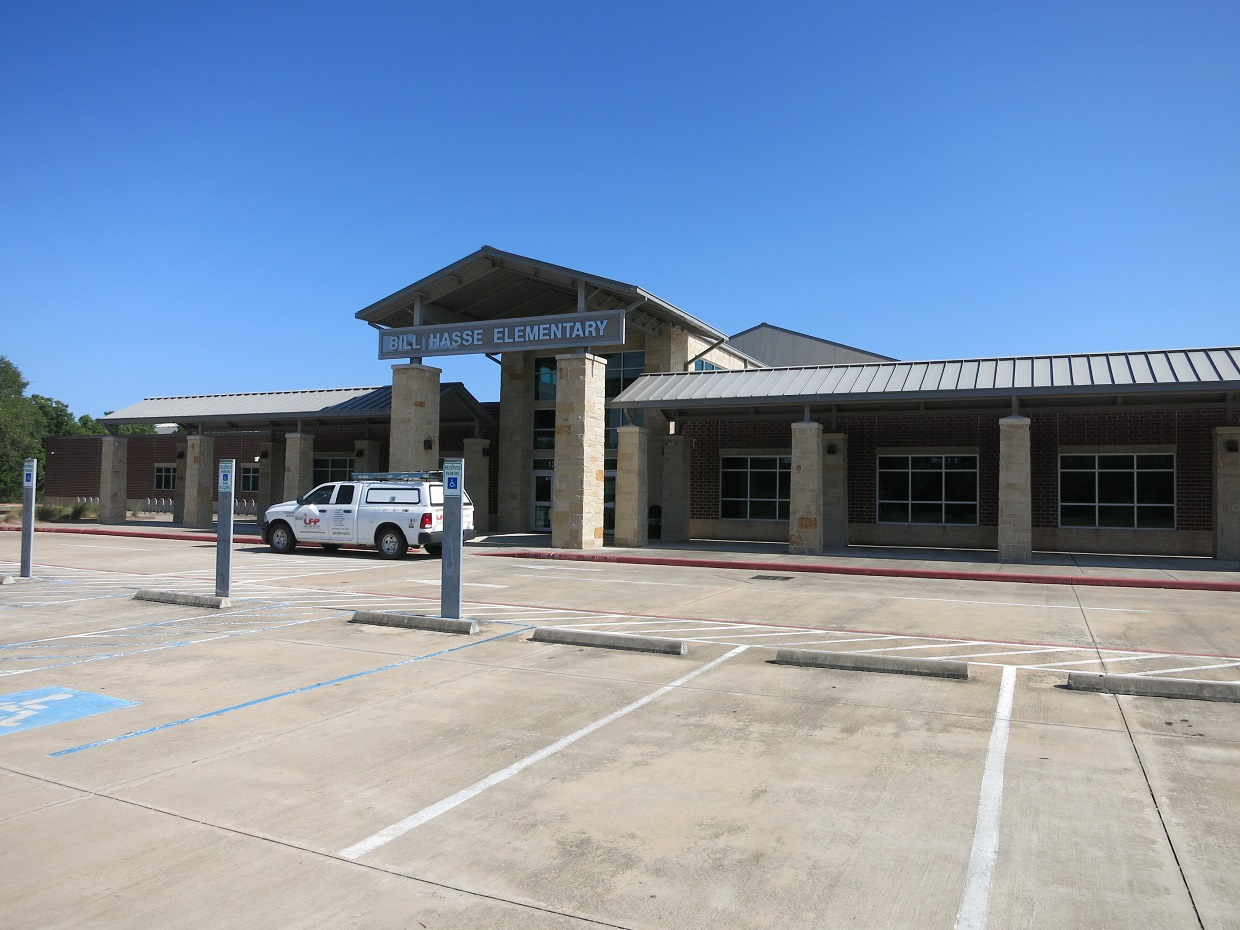
Bill Hasse Elementary School

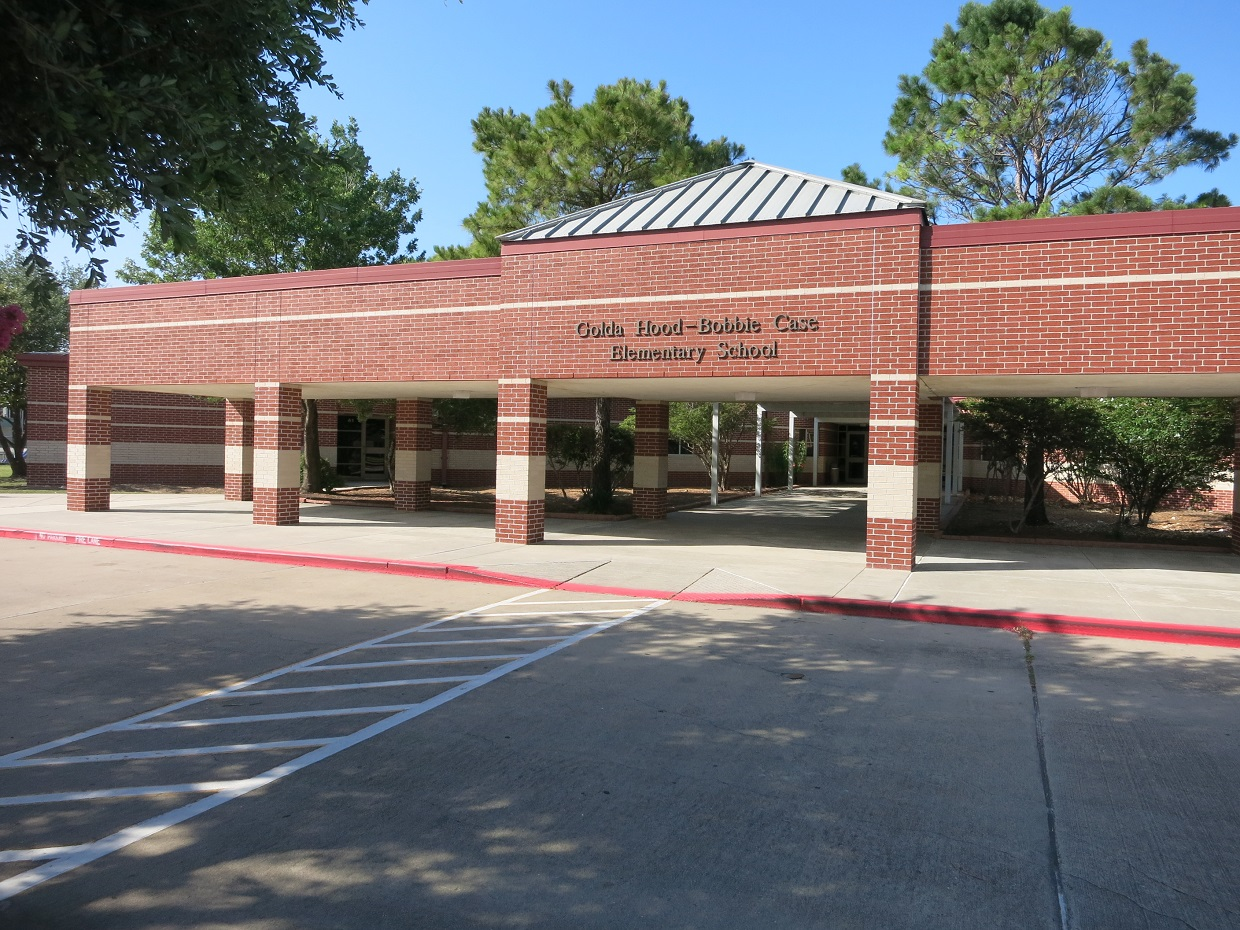
Golda Hood - Bobbie Case Elementary School

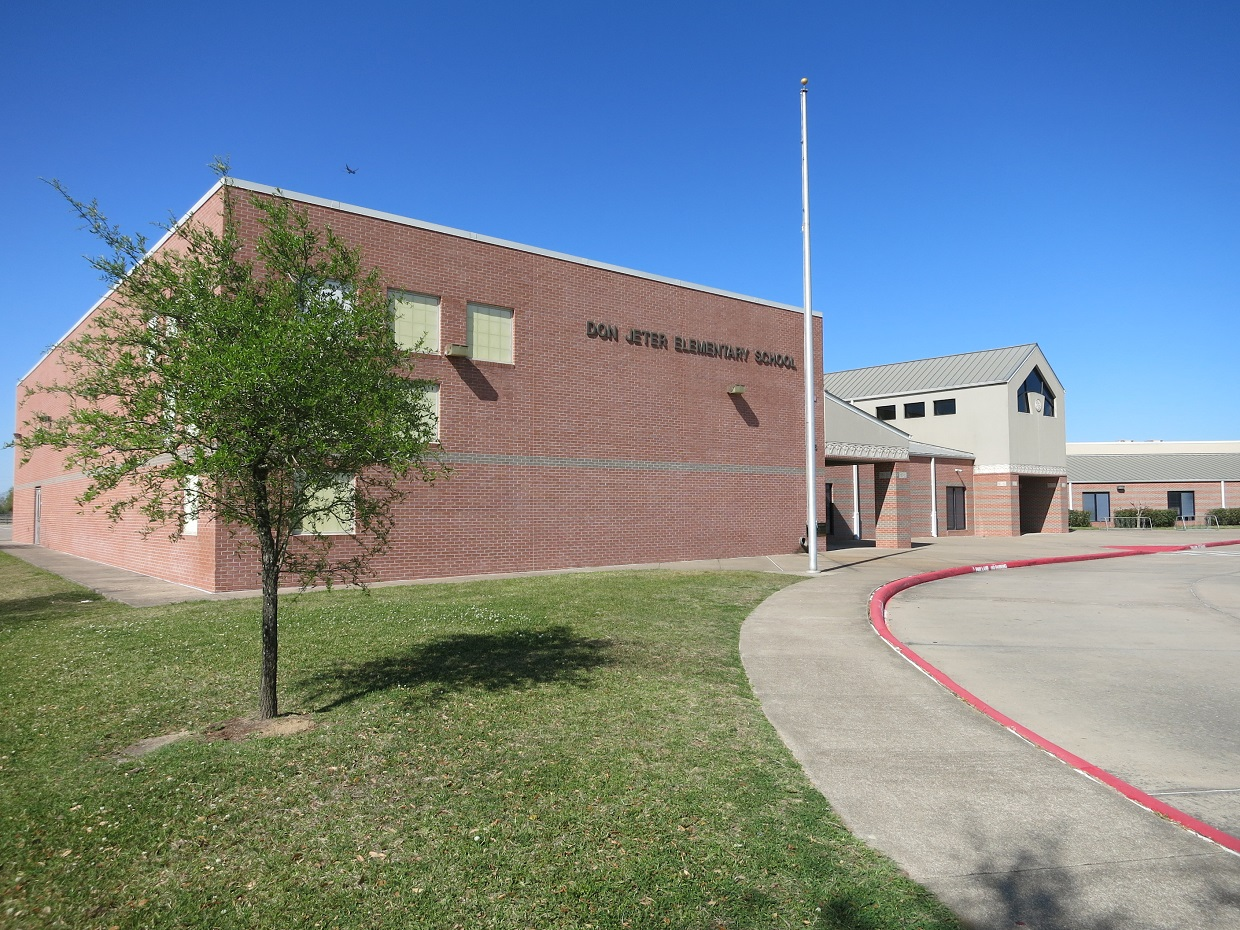
Don Jeter Elementary School

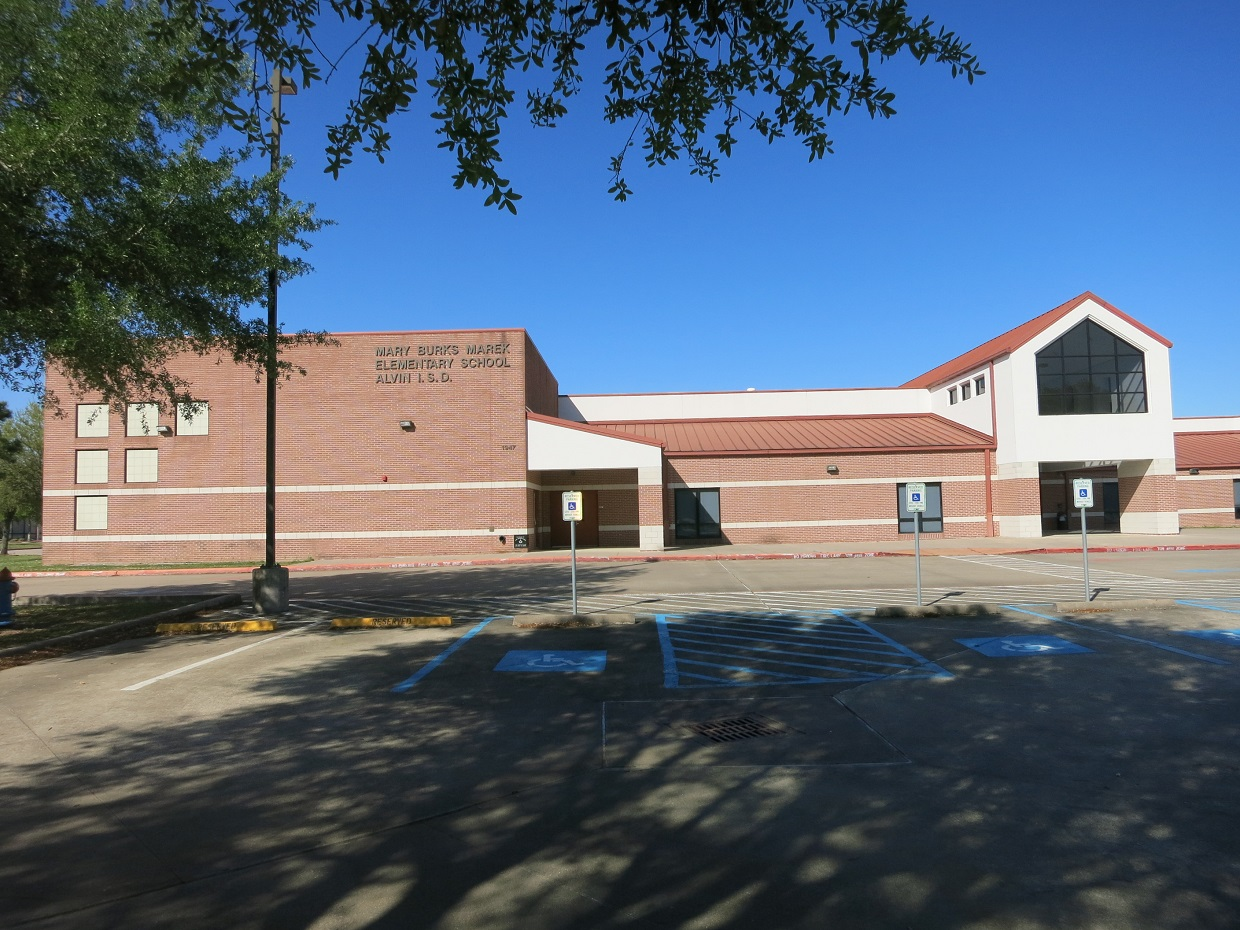
Mary Burks Marek Elementary School

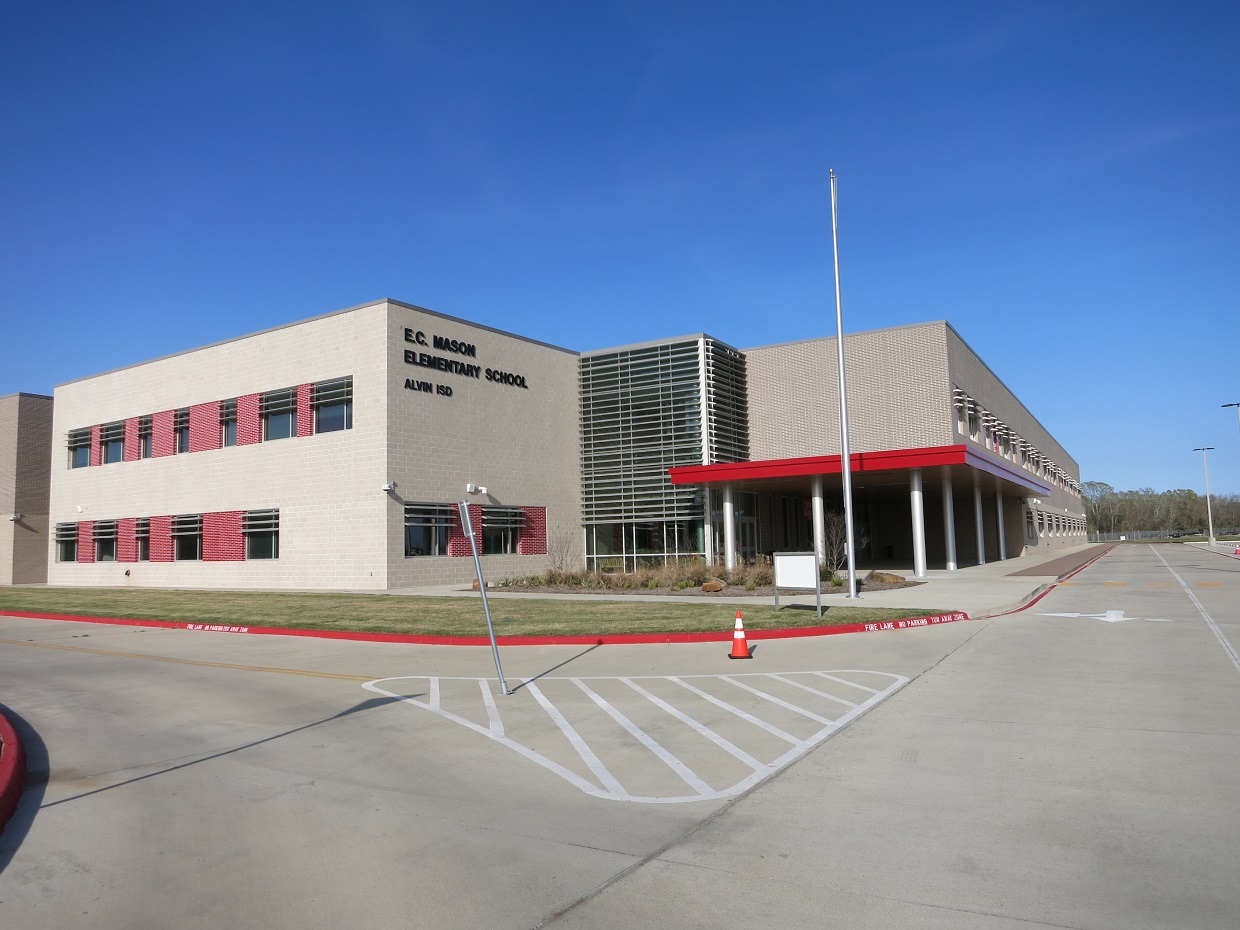
E.C. Mason Elementary School

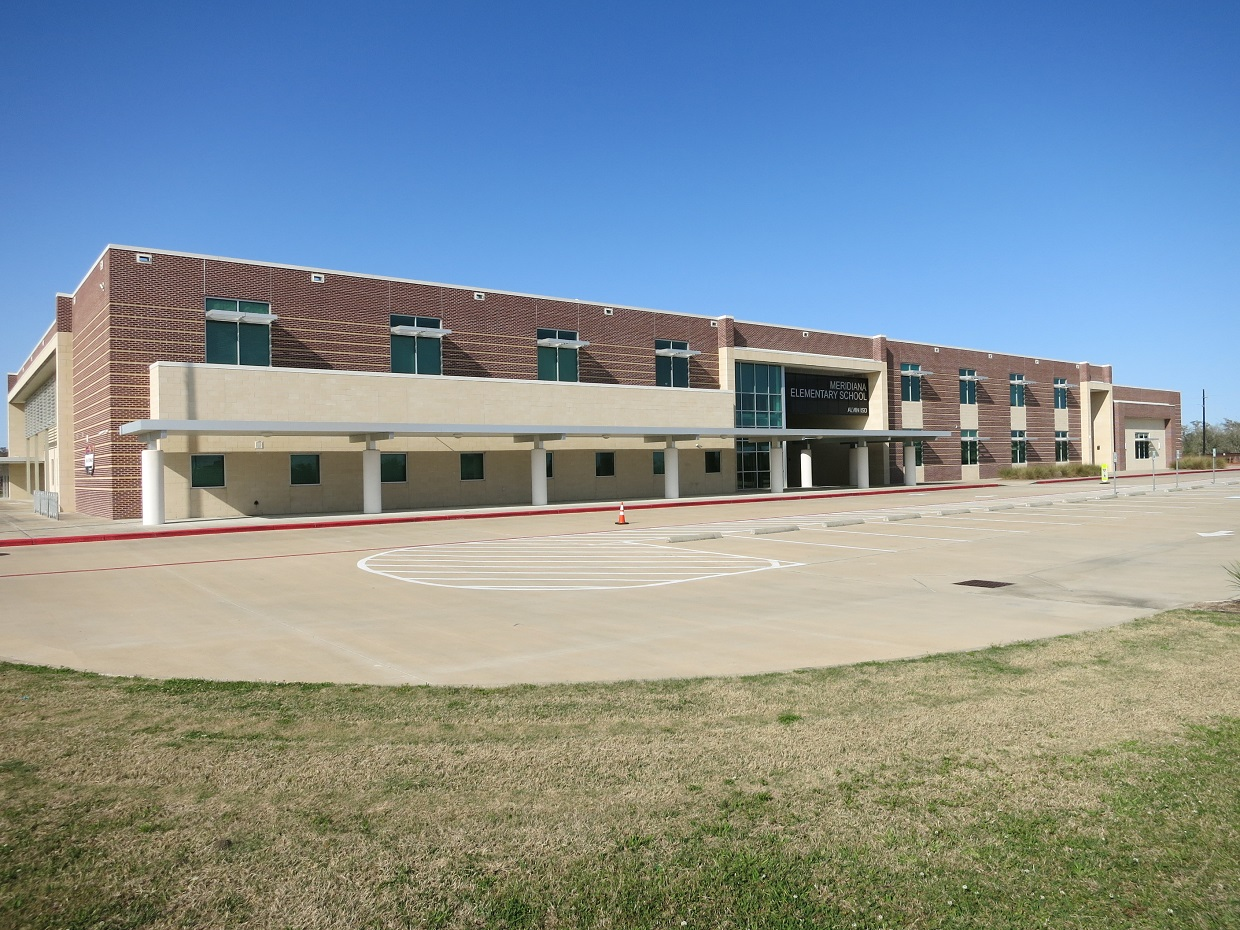
Meridiana Elementary School

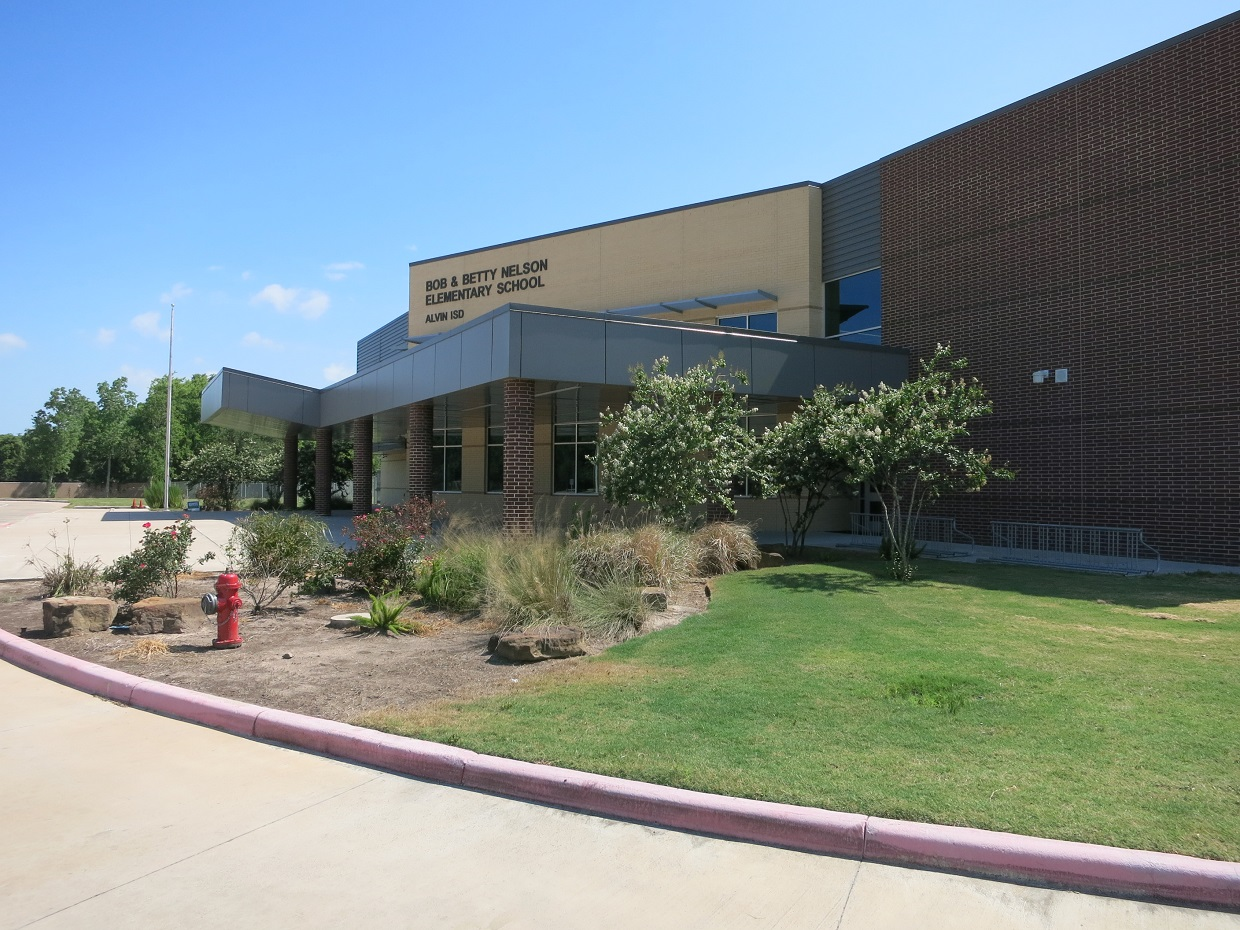
Bob and Betty Nelson Elementary School

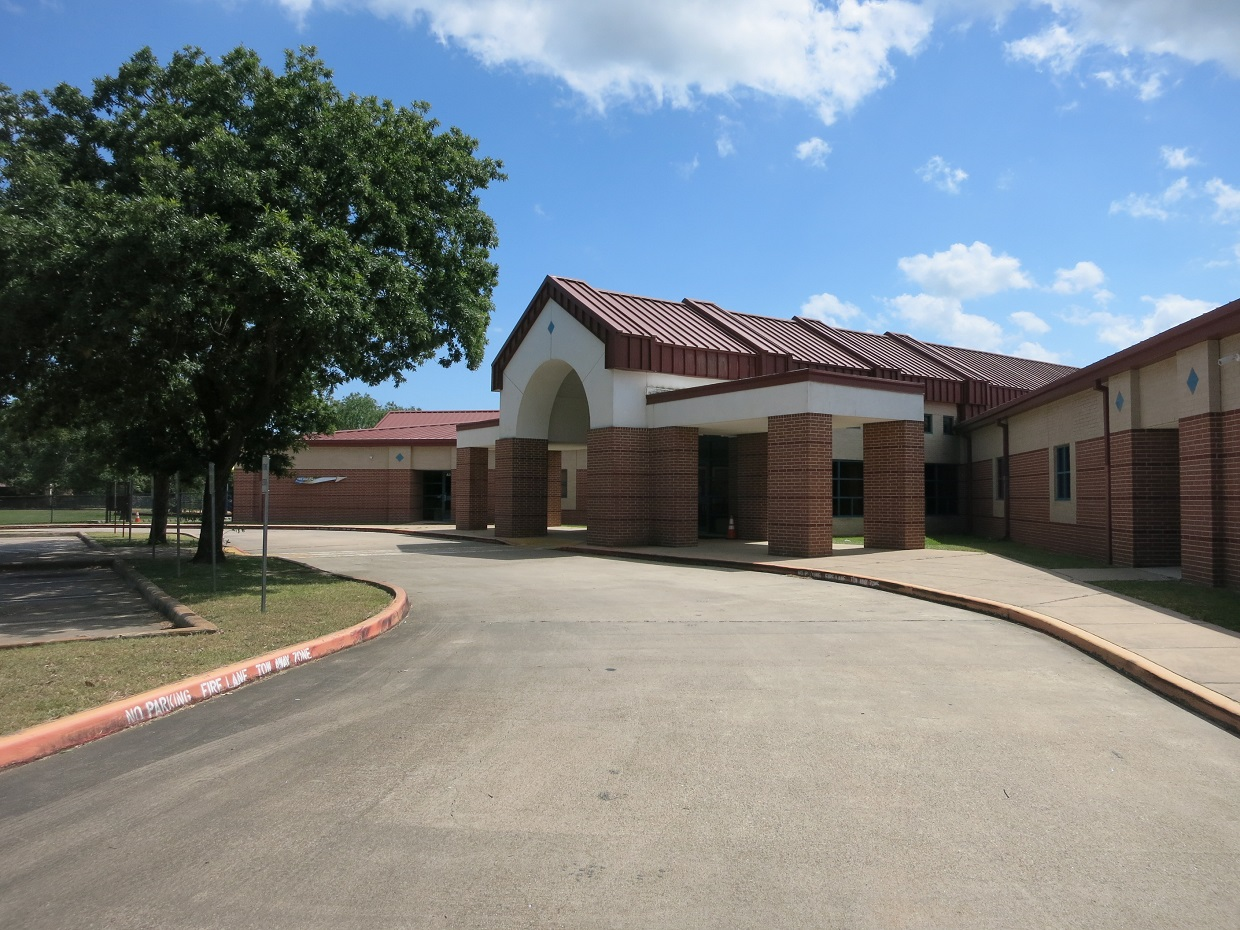
Melba L. Passmore Elementary School

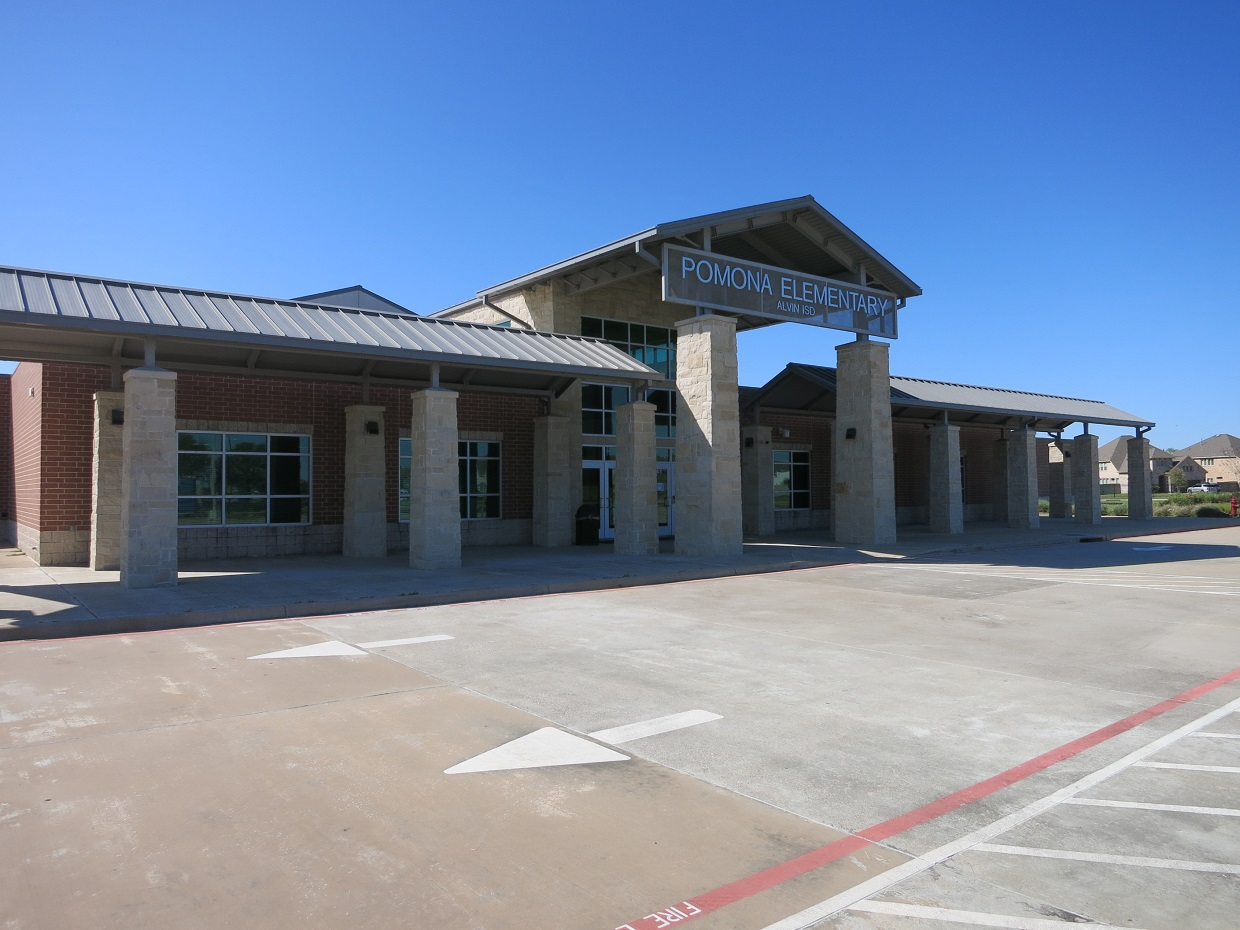
Pomona Elementary School

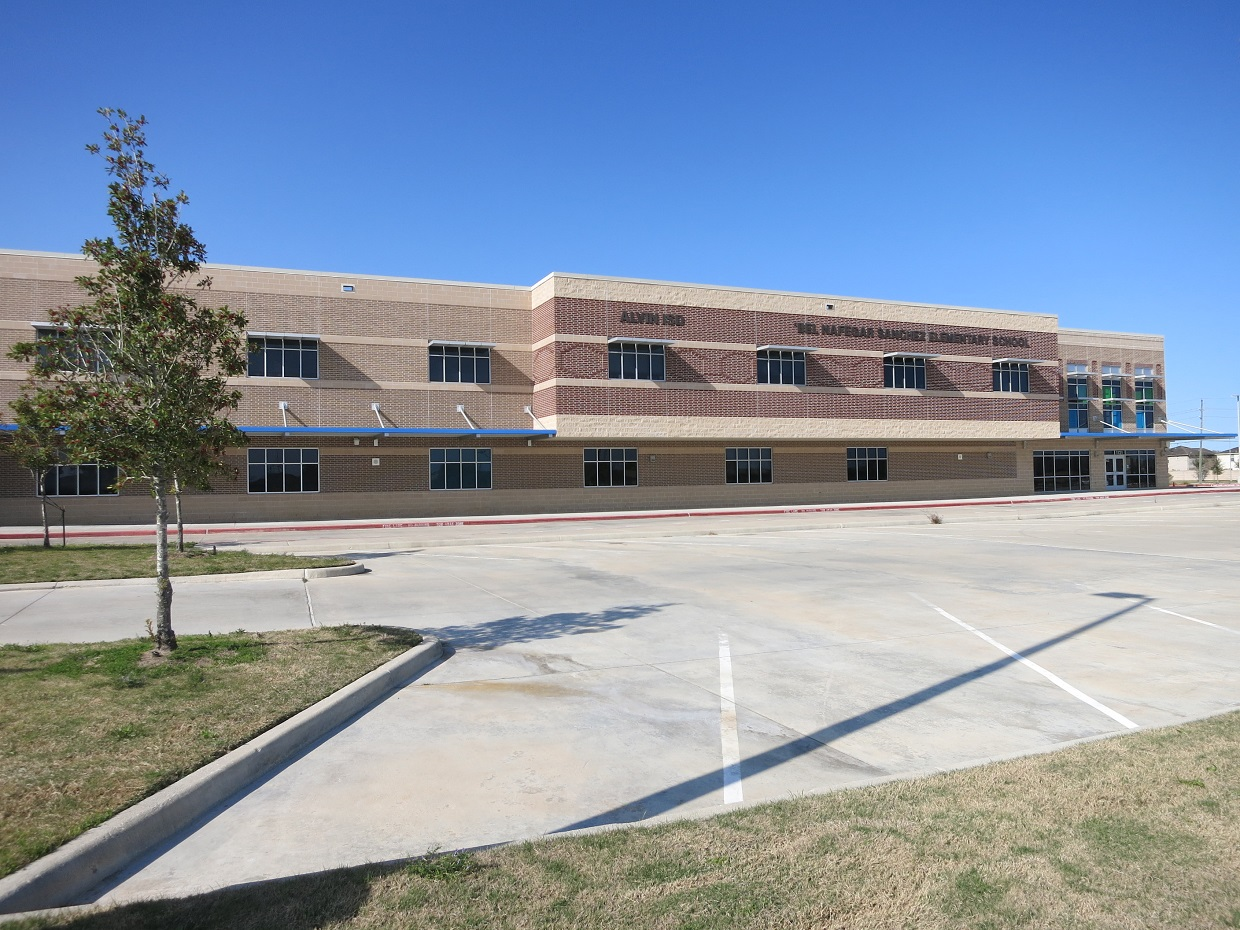
Bel Nafegar Sanchez Elementary School

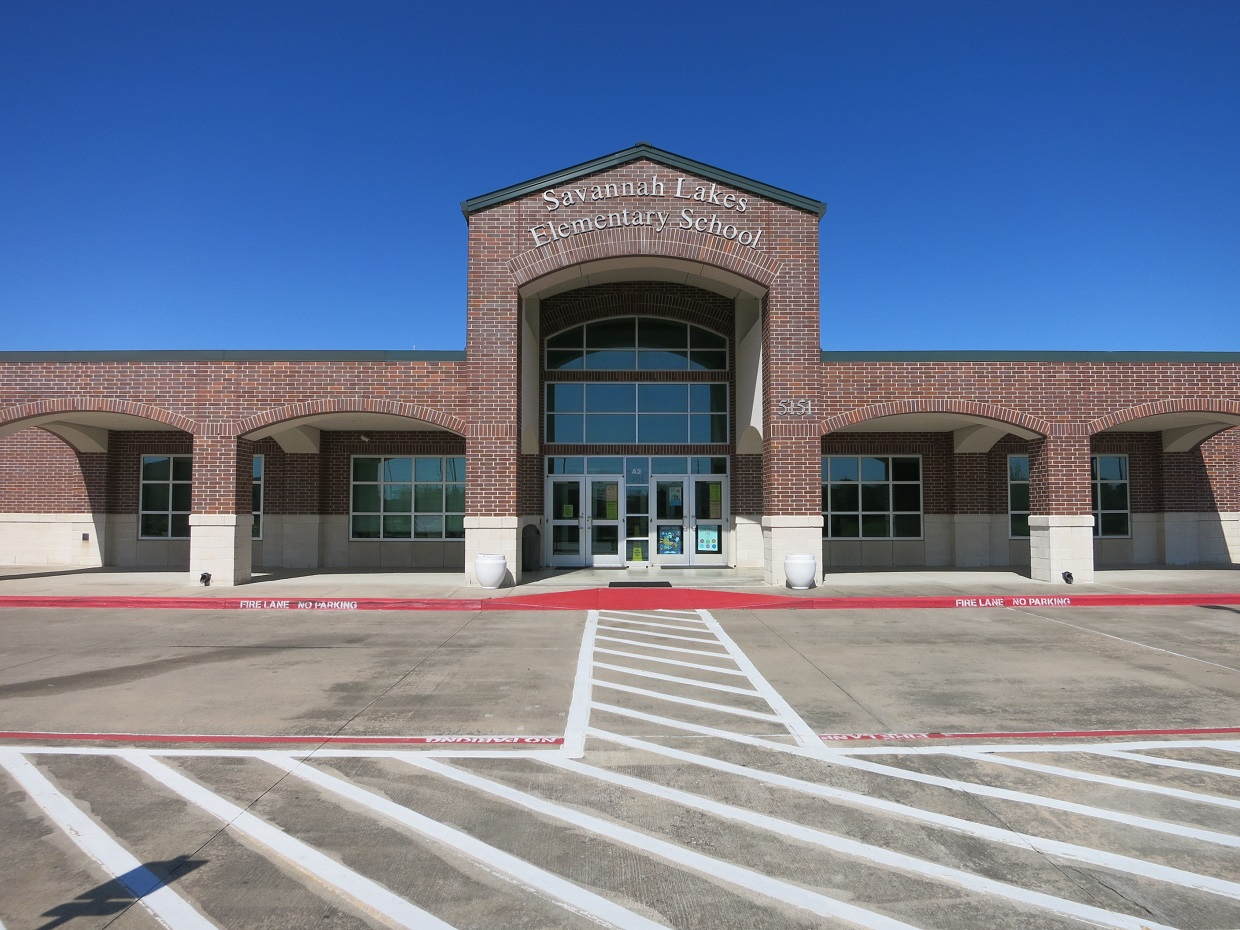
Savannah Lakes Elementary School

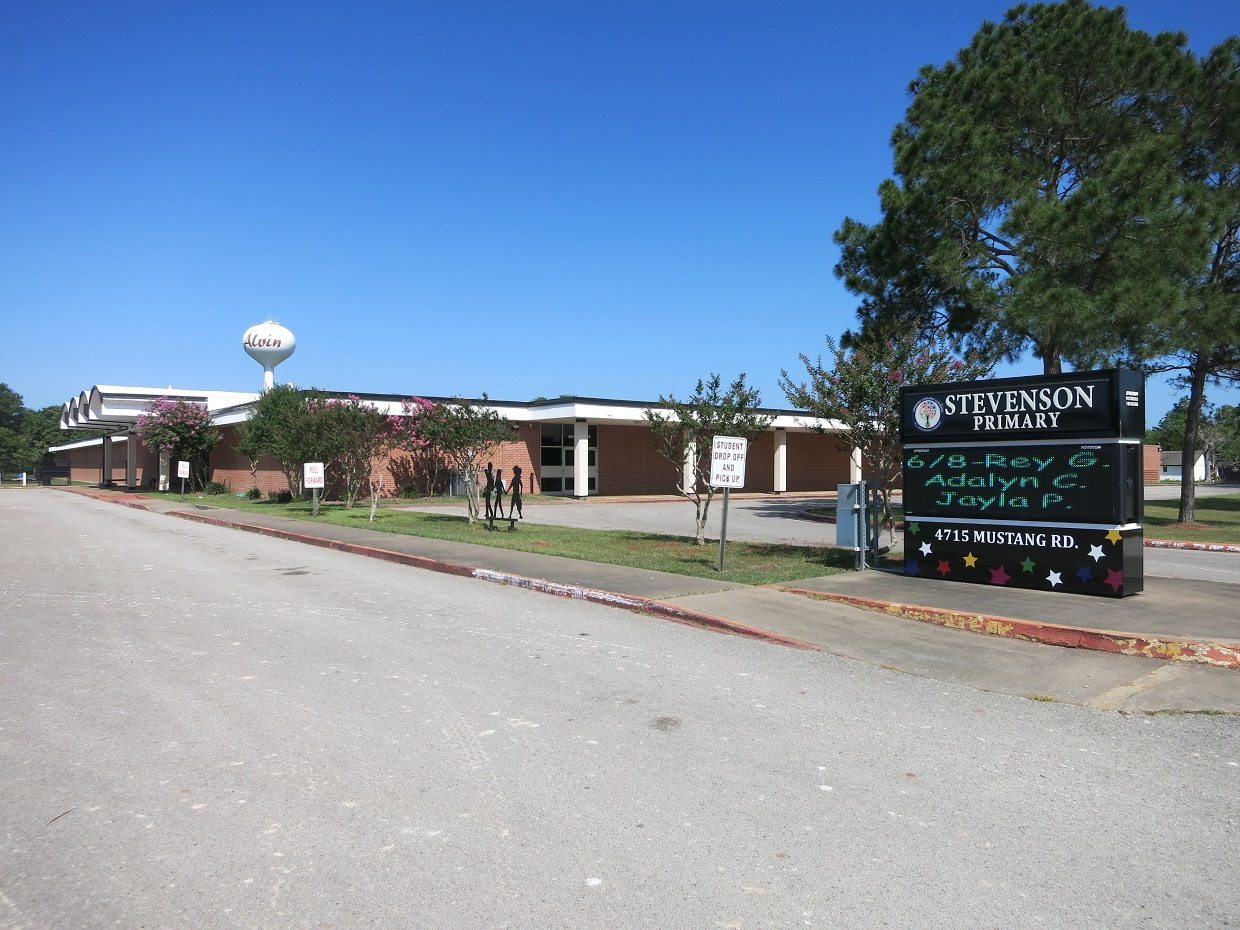
Robert Louis Stevenson Primary School

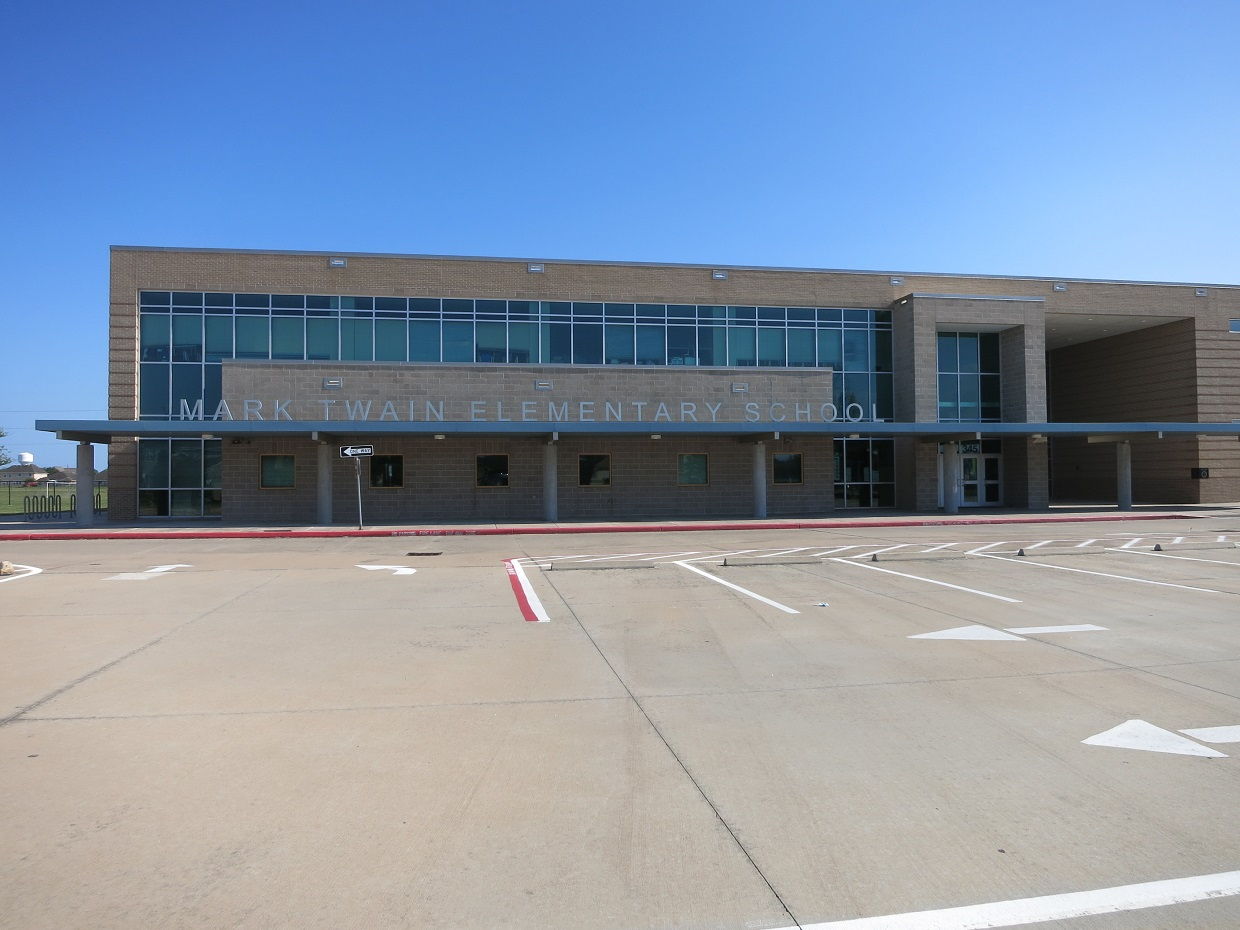
Mark Twain Elementary School

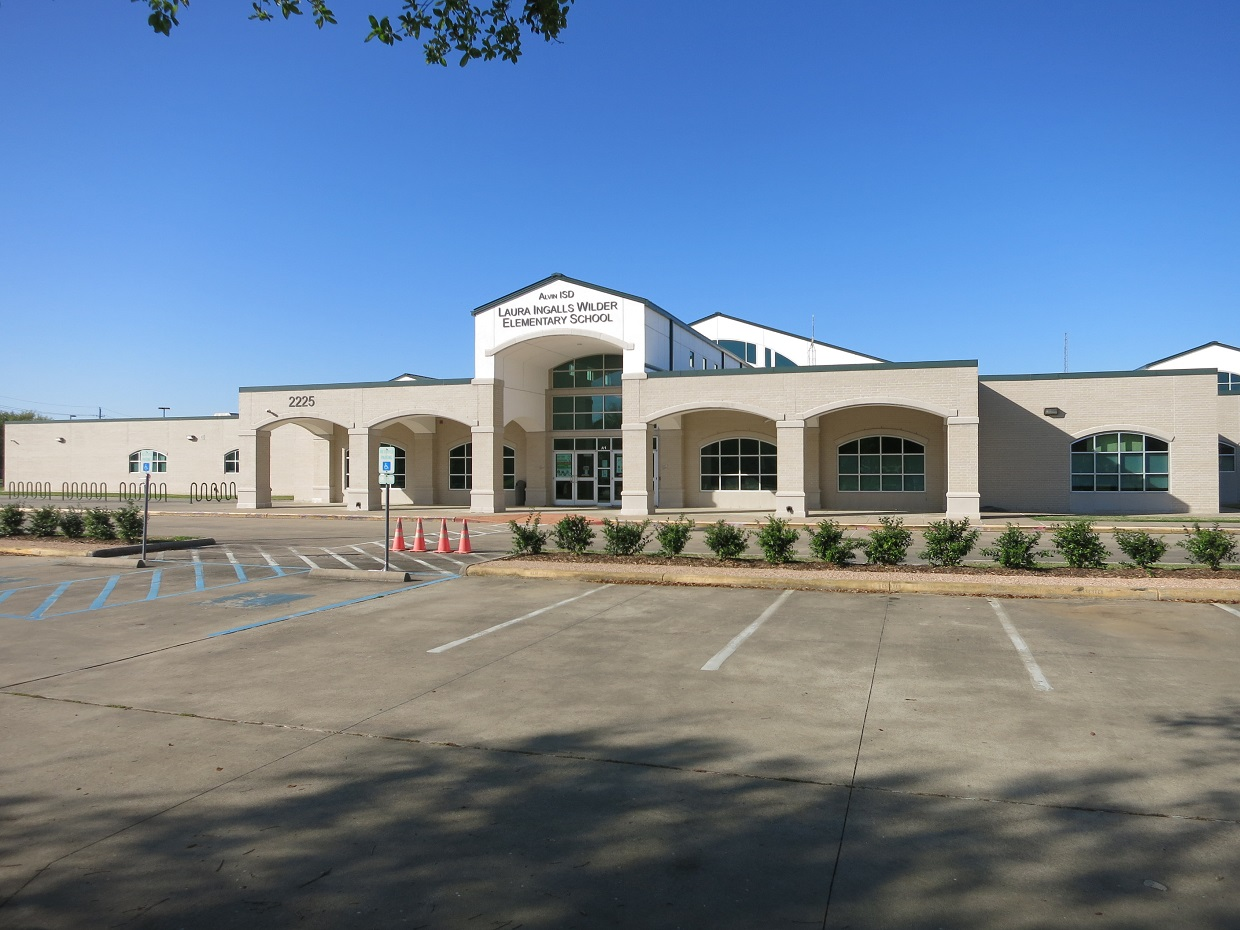
Laura Ingalls Wilder Elementary School

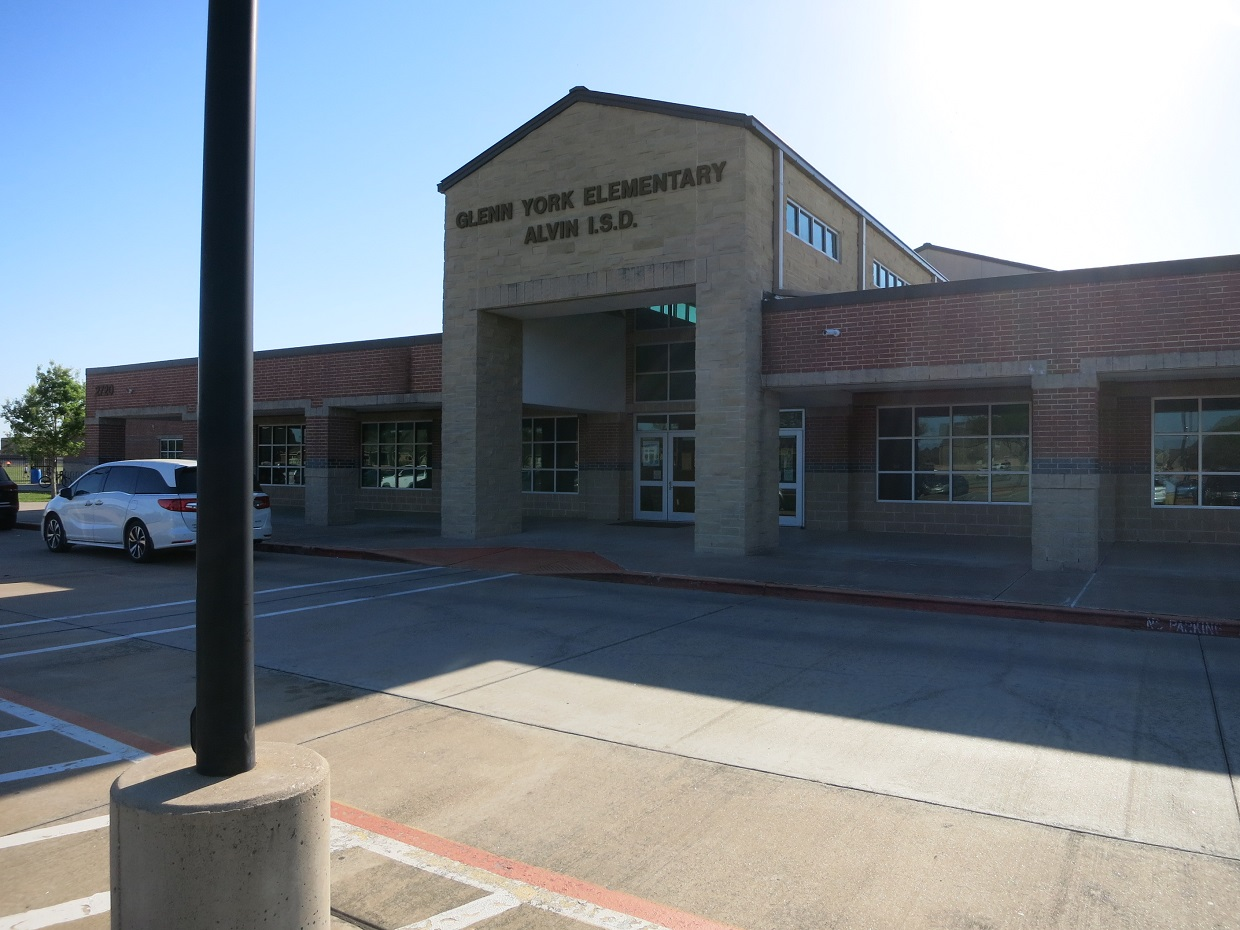
Glenn York Elementary School

=== Alternative Schools ===
Name	City	Year opened	Notes
RISE Academy (formally ASSETS Academy)	Alvin	1994	
ADAPT	Alvin	1992	
J.B. Hensler College and Career Academy	Manvel	2017	

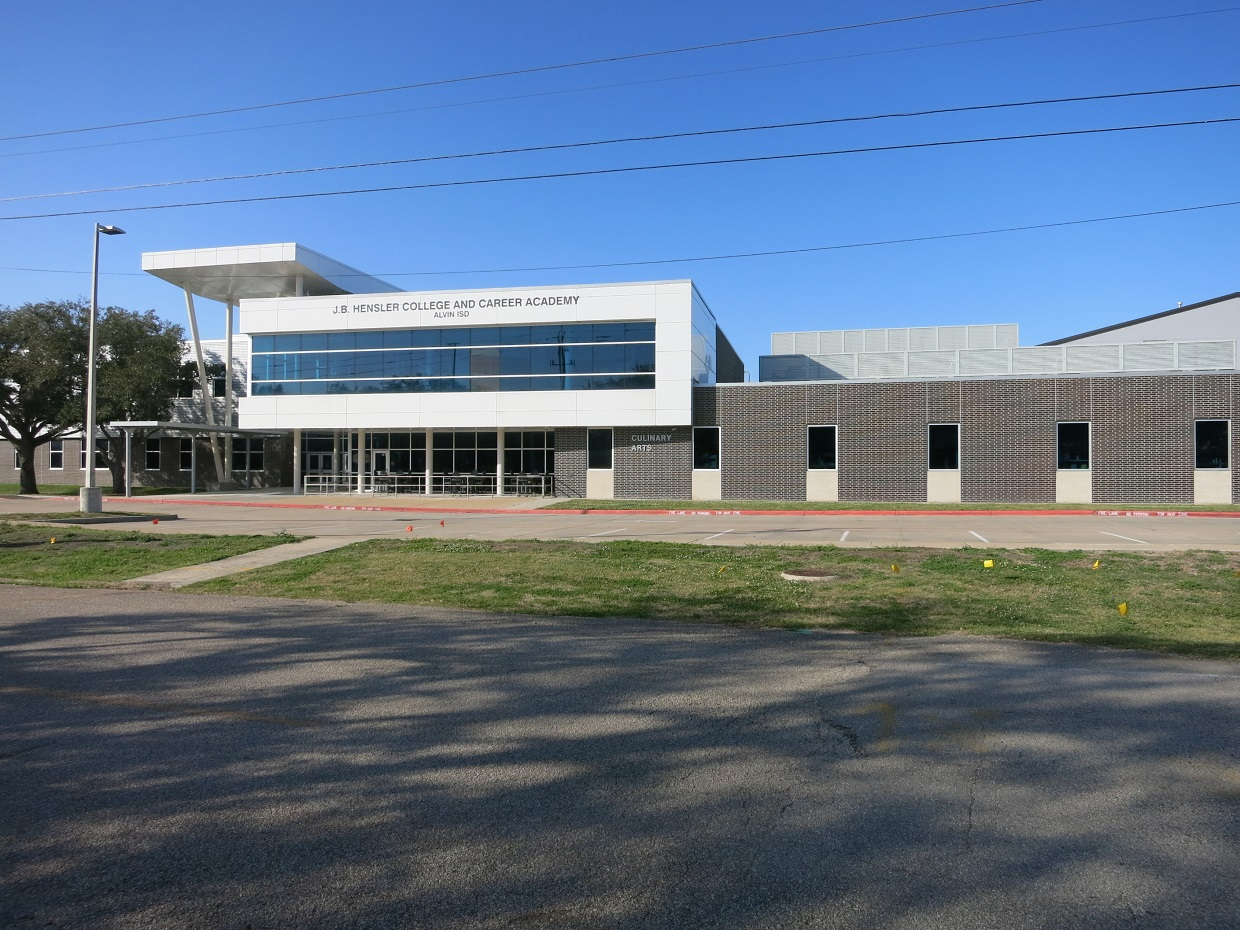
J.B. Hensler College and Career Academy

== See also ==
- List of school districts in Texas
- List of high schools in Texas
