= Austin (surname) =

Name list

Origin
- Origin: Latin
- Region of origin: England

Austin is an English surname, an Old French language contraction of Agustin as Aostin and Austin (regular disappearing of intervocalic [g] from Late Latin to Old French; compare month August: Old French aüst / aoust, French août). Agustin is the popular form of Augustin, equivalent to Augustine.

== Notable people with the surname "Austin" include ==
=== A ===
- Aaron Austin (1745–1829), American judge
- Alana Austin (born 1982), American actress
- Albert Austin (disambiguation), multiple people
- Alex Austin (born 2001), American football player
- Alfred Austin (1835–1913), British poet
- Alfredo López Austin (1936–2021), Mexican historian
- Alice Constance Austin (1862–1930), American architect
- Alicia Austin (born 1942), American author
- Alvin O. Austin (born 1942), American academic administrator
- Amanda Austin (1859–1917), American painter and sculptor
- Andrew Austin (disambiguation), multiple people
- Ann Austin (????–1665), Quaker preacher
- Anne Austin (writer) (1895–??), American writer
- Annie Austin, English academic administrator
- Archibald Austin (1772–1837), American politician
- Arthur Austin (disambiguation), multiple people
- Ato Austin (??–1998), Ghanaian politician
- Austin Austin (1855–1925), Australian politician

=== B ===
- Barry Austin (1968–2021), British heavy man
- Ben Austin (disambiguation), multiple people
- Bernard Austin (disambiguation), multiple people
- Bill Austin (disambiguation), multiple people
- Blake Austin (born 1991), Australian rugby league footballer
- Blessuan Austin (born 1996), American football player
- Bobby Austin (disambiguation), multiple people
- Brady Austin (born 1993), Canadian ice hockey player
- Brenda Austin (born 1981), Argentine politician
- Brent Austin (born 2003), American football player
- Brett Austin (1959–1989), New Zealand swimmer
- Brian Austin (born 1943), Australian politician
- Buddy Austin (1929–1981), American professional wrestler
- Bunny Austin (1906–2000), British tennis player

=== C ===
- Calvin Austin (born 1999), American football player
- Caroline Austin, British molecular biologist
- C. G. Austin (1846–1925), American politician
- Charles Austin (disambiguation), multiple people
- Charlotte Elizabeth Austin (1878–1933), Australian community worker
- Chase Austin (born 1989), American race car driver
- Chris Austin (1964–1991), American singer
- Christopher Austin (born 1968), British conductor
- Chuck Austin, American professional wrestler
- Claire Austin (1918–1994), American musician
- Cliff Austin (born 1960), American football player
- Clyde Austin (1957–2025), American basketball player
- Coco Austin (born 1979), American actress
- Coe Finch Austin (1831–1880), American botanist
- Colin Austin (disambiguation), multiple people
- Craig Austin (born 1979), American basketball player
- Cuba Austin (1906–1961), American drummer

=== D ===
- Dallas Austin (born 1970), American musician
- Dan Austin, English sound engineer
- Daniel Austin (1935–2013), Pakistani brigadier
- Darrell Austin (born 1951), American football player
- Daryl Austin, Australian artist
- David Austin (disambiguation), multiple people
- Dean Austin (born 1970), English footballer
- Debbie Austin (born 1948), American golfer
- Debi Austin (1950–2013), American anti-smoking advocate
- Debra Austin (disambiguation), multiple people
- Denise Austin (disambiguation), multiple people
- Dennis Austin (1947–2023), American software developer
- Derek Austin (1921–2001), British librarian
- Doris Jean Austin (1949–1994), American author and journalist

=== E ===
- Earl Edwin Austin, American criminal
- Eddie Austin (born 1952), Scottish-American soccer player
- Edward Austin (disambiguation), multiple people
- Edith Austin (1867–1953), English tennis player
- Effie Adelaide Payne Austin (1880–1949), American musician
- Elizabeth Austin (disambiguation), multiple people
- Elmer Austin (1949–2023), American basketball player
- Emilio Lozoya Austin (born 1974), Mexican politician
- Emily Austin (journalist) (born 2001), American journalist
- Eric Austin (disambiguation), multiple people
- Ernest Austin (1874–1947), English composer
- Evan Austin (born 1992), American Paralympic swimmer
- Eve Austin, British actress

=== F ===
- Florence Austin (1884–1927), American violinist
- Francis Austin (disambiguation), multiple people
- Frank Austin (disambiguation), multiple people
- Frederick Austin (disambiguation), multiple people

=== G ===
- Gary Austin (1941–2017), American theatre director
- Gene Austin (1900–1972), American singer
- Geoffrey Austin (1837–1902), British army officer
- George Austin (disambiguation), multiple people
- Gerald Austin (disambiguation), multiple people
- Gerry Austin (born 1941), American football official
- Gilbert Austin (1753–1837), Irish author
- Gilbert Austin (rugby league) (1895–1948), English rugby league footballer
- Graeme Austin (born 1952), Australian rules footballer
- Granville Austin (1927–2014), American historian
- Greg Austin (disambiguation), multiple people
- Guerin Austin (born 1980), American television host

=== H ===
- Harold Austin (1877–1943), Barbadian politician and cricketer
- Harold Austin (Australian cricketer) (1903–1981), Australian cricketer
- Harriet Austin (disambiguation), multiple people
- Harry Austin (1892–1968), English cricketer
- Hattie Moseley Austin (1900–1998), American chef
- Hedley Austin (born 1960), South African cricketer
- Helen Austin (disambiguation), multiple people
- Henry Austin (disambiguation), multiple people
- Herbert Austin (1866–1941), British entrepreneur
- Herschel Austin (1911–1974), British politician
- Hise Austin (1950–2019), American football player
- Horace Austin (1831–1905), American politician
- Horatio Thomas Austin (1800–1865), English naval officer
- Hubert Austin (1845–1915), British architect
- Hudson Austin (1938–2022), Grenadian military officer

=== I ===
- Ian Austin (born 1965), British politician
- Ian Austin (cricketer) (born 1966), English cricketer
- Isaac Austin (born 1969), American basketball player
- Isaiah Austin (born 1993), American basketball player
- Ivy Austin (born 1958), American actress

=== J ===
- Jack Austin (disambiguation), multiple people
- Jacquelyn D. Austin (born 1966), American lawyer
- Jake T. Austin (born 1994), American actor
- James Austin (disambiguation), multiple people
- Jane G. Austin (1831–1894), American writer
- Janet Austin (born 1956/1957), Canadian public servant
- Jason Austin, Australian rugby league footballer
- Jean-Herbert Austin (born 1950), Haitian footballer
- Jeff Austin (disambiguation), multiple people
- Jeffery Austin (born 1991), American musician
- Jehannine Austin, Canadian geneticist
- Jennifer Jones Austin (born 1969), American corporate executive
- Jere Austin (1876–1927), American actor
- Jillian Austin (1986-), American psychologist and researcher
- Jim Austin (disambiguation), multiple people
- J. L. Austin (1911–1960), British philosopher
- Joan Austin (1903–1998), British tennis player
- Jock Austin (1938–1990), Australian Indigenous community leader
- Joe Austin, American football player and coach
- John Austin (disambiguation), multiple people
- Johntá Austin (born 1980), American singer-songwriter
- Jonathan Austin (disambiguation), multiple people
- Joy Ford Austin, Guyanese-American philanthropist
- Julian Austin (disambiguation), multiple people
- Julie Austin, British corporate executive
- J. Win Austin, American businessman

=== K ===
- Kaila Austin, American visual artist
- Karen Austin (born 1955), American actress
- Karl Austin (born 1961), English footballer
- Kate Austin (1864–1902), American writer
- Kathi Lynn Austin (born 1960), American human rights activist
- Keith Austin, American politician
- Ken Austin (disambiguation), multiple people
- Kent Austin (born 1963), American football player and coach
- Kevin Austin (disambiguation), multiple people
- Kiera Austin (born 1997), Australian netball player
- Kris Austin (born 1979), Canadian politician
- Kyle Austin (born 1988), American basketball player

=== L ===
- Lana Austin (born 1986), English professional wrestler
- Larry Austin (1930–2018), American composer
- Lawrence Austin (born 1956), Australian boxer
- Leonard B. Austin, American judge
- Les Austin (born 1936), Australian rugby union footballer
- Linda Austin (born 1951), American psychiatrist
- Lisle Austin (1936–2021), Barbadian football executive
- Lloyd Austin (disambiguation), multiple people
- Logan Austin (born 1995), Australian rules footballer
- Lorena Austin, American politician
- Louis Austin (disambiguation), multiple people
- Lovie Austin (1887–1972), American musician
- Lynne Austin (born 1961), American model and actress

=== M ===
- Malcolm Austin (1880–1958), Guyanese cricketer
- Margaret Austin (born 1933), New Zealand politician
- Mario Austin (born 1982), American basketball player
- Margot Austin (1907–1990), American illustrator
- Mark Austin (disambiguation), multiple people
- Marvin Austin (born 1989), American football player
- Mary Austin (disambiguation), multiple people
- Matt Austin (disambiguation), multiple people
- Maurice Austin (1916–1985), Australian army officer
- Mervyn Austin (1913–1991), Australian professor
- Michael Austin (disambiguation), multiple people
- Michele Austin, British actress
- Mick Austin, British artist
- Mike Austin (disambiguation), multiple people
- Miles Austin (born 1984), American football player
- Mitch Austin (born 1991), Australian footballer
- Moffitt Austin (1873–1942), Australian cricketer
- Moses Austin (1761–1821), American businessman

=== N ===
- Nancy Austin (born 1949), American writer
- Ned Austin (1925–2007), American actor
- Neil Austin (disambiguation), multiple people
- Neill Austin (1924–2008), New Zealand politician
- Nigel Austin (born 1970), Australian entrepreneur
- Norvell Austin (born 1958), American professional wrestler

=== O ===
- Ocie Austin (1947–2014), American football player
- Oliver L. Austin (1903–1988), American ornithologist
- Oscar P. Austin (1948–1969), American soldier
- Oscar Phelps Austin (1847–1933), American statistician
- O. V. Austin (1890–1960), American sports coach

=== P ===
- Pam Austin (born 1950), American tennis player
- Pamela Austin (born 1941), American actress
- Pat Austin (born 1964), American drag racer
- Patti Austin (born 1950), American singer-songwriter
- Paul Britten Austin (1922–2005), English author
- Pauline Morrow Austin (1916–2011), American physicist
- Penelope Austin (born 1989), Australian singer-songwriter
- Peter Austin (disambiguation), multiple people
- Philip Austin (disambiguation), multiple people
- PJ Austin (born 2000), American sprinter
- Preston Austin (1827–1908), Welsh clergyman

=== R ===
- Ralph Austin (disambiguation), multiple people
- Ray Austin (disambiguation), multiple people
- Raymond D. Austin, Navajo scholar and judge
- Rebecca Merritt Smith Leonard Austin (1832–1919), American botanist
- Reggie Austin (disambiguation), multiple people
- Reneé Austin (born 1966), American singer-songwriter
- Rex Austin (1931–2022), New Zealand politician
- R. F. E. Austin (1866–1939), British physician
- Richard Austin (disambiguation), multiple people
- Robert Austin (disambiguation), multiple people
- Robin Austin (born 1958), Canadian businessman and politician
- Rod Austin (born 1953), Australian rules footballer
- Rodney Austin (born 1988), American football player
- Rodolph Austin (born 1985), Jamaican footballer
- Roger Austin (born 1940), English Air Force officer
- Ron Austin (1929–2019), Australian gay rights activist
- Roswell M. Austin (1887–1966), American politician
- Roy Austin (born 1939), American ambassador
- Ryan Austin (cricketer) (born 1981), Trinidadian cricketer
- Ryan Austin (footballer) (born 1984), English footballer

=== S ===
- Samuel Austin (disambiguation), multiple people
- Sarah Austin (disambiguation), multiple people
- Sarita Austin, American politician
- Shakira Austin (born 2000), American basketball player
- Shane Austin (born 1989), American football player
- Shawn Austin (born 1996), Canadian singer
- Shayne Austin (born 1978), New Zealand rugby union footballer
- Sherman Austin (born 1983), American anarchist
- Sherrié Austin (born 1970), Australian musician
- Shrone Austin (born 1989), Seychellois swimmer
- Sil Austin (1929–2001), American saxophonist
- Sophie Austin (born 1984), English actress
- Staryl C. Austin (1920–2015), American Air Force general
- Stephen F. Austin (1793–1836), American politician
- Stephen Austin (American football) (born 1934), American football executive
- Steve Austin (disambiguation), multiple people
- Stone Cold Steve Austin (born 1964), American professional wrestler and actor
- Susan Austin, American politician
- Sydney Austin (1866–1932), Australian cricketer

=== T ===
- Tal Austin (1857–1941), New Zealand cricketer and rugby union footballer
- Tavon Austin (born 1990), American football player
- Taylor Austin (born 1990), Canadian bobsledder
- Teri Austin (born 1957), Canadian actress
- Terrence Austin (born 1988), American football player
- Terri Austin (born 1955), American educator and politician
- Terry Austin (disambiguation), multiple people
- Teryl Austin (born 1965), American football coach
- Tex Austin (1886–1938), American rodeo promoter
- Thomas Austin (disambiguation), multiple people
- Tim Austin (boxer) (born 1971), American boxer
- Tim Austin (musician), American musician
- Tje Austin, American singer-songwriter
- Tom Austin (disambiguation), multiple people
- Tracy Austin (born 1962), American tennis player
- Tyler Austin (born 1991), American baseball player

=== V ===
- Valer Austin, American permaculturalist
- Valerie Austin (born 1946), English hypnotherapist
- Vivian Austin (1920–2004), American actress

=== W ===
- Walter W. Austin (1936–2014), American Naval captain
- Wanda Austin (born 1954), American corporate executive
- Ward Austin (1935–1998), Australian disc jockey
- Warren Austin (1877–1962), American ambassador
- Wendy Austin, British journalist
- William Austin (disambiguation), multiple people
- Winifred Austin (1873–1918), British librarian
- Woody Austin (born 1964), American golfer

== Fictional characters ==
- Meg Austin, in the television series JAG
- Steve Austin (character), protagonist of the novel Cyborg and the subsequent television series The Six Million Dollar Man
- Xavier Austin, in the soap opera Home and Away

== See also ==
- General Austin (disambiguation)
- Justice Austin (disambiguation)
- Senator Austin (disambiguation)
