= F. Warren McFarlan =

American educator

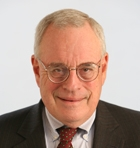
- Education: Harvard University (BA, MBA, DBA)
- Occupation(s): Emeritus Professor, Harvard Business School; Co-Director, Tsinghua University Case Center

F. Warren McFarlan is the T.J. Dermot Dunphy Baker Foundation Professor of Business Administration, and Albert H. Gordon Professor of Business Administration, Emeritus, at Harvard Business School. He is the author of 14 books and over 300 cases and teaching notes in the fields of Information Technology, China, and Social Enterprise.

== Education ==
He received his BA in 1959 from Harvard University (1965) followed by an MBA (1961) and DBA (1965) from Harvard Business School.

== Career ==
=== Harvard Business School ===
McFarlan began his career at Harvard Business School as a research assistant from 1961 to 1962. He then served briefly as research associate before becoming an assistant professor in 1965 and then an associate professor in 1969.

In 1973, shortly after appointment to full professor, along with four colleagues, he established Harvard's International Senior Management Program in Switzerland. After his return in 1975, he became chairman of the Advanced Management Program, a position he held until 1978; and chairman of all executive education programs from 1977 to 1980. He later became senior associate dean and director of research from 1991 to 1995, senior associate dean and director of external relations from 1995 to 2000, and senior associate dean and director of Asia Pacific from 1999 to 2004. He continues to teach in the Harvard Business School Executive Programs for Non-Profit Leaders and board members.

=== Tsinghua University ===
McFarlan served as guest professor and co-director at the Case Development Center at the Tsinghua University School of Economics and Management in Beijing, China from 2009 to 2015

== Awards ==
McFarlan received an honorary doctorate from the University of Turku, Finland in 1989.

== Works ==
=== Books ===
- Can China Lead? Reaching the Limits of Power and Growth' – F. Warren McFarlan, William C. Kirby, Regina M. Abrami (2014)
- Joining a Non-Profit Board: What You Need to Know – F. Warren McFarlan, Marc J. Epstein (2011)
- Chinese General Management: Tsinghua-Harvard Text and Cases – F. Warren McFarlan, Guoqing Chen (2009)
- Corporate Information Strategy and Management: Text and Cases (Seventh Edition) – F. Warren McFarlan, Lynda M. Applegate, Robert D. Austin (2006)
- Seizing Strategic IT Advantage in China – F. Warren McFarlan, Guoqing Chen (2003)
- Creating Business Advantage in the Information Age – F. Warren McFarlan, Lynda M. Applegate, Robert D. Austin (2002) ard Business Review.

=== Publications ===
- Editor (1984) Information Systems Research Challenge, published by the Harvard Business School Press
- Senior Editor, MIS Quarterly (1986–1988)

== Archives and records ==
- F. Warren McFarlan papers at Baker Library Special Collections, Harvard Business School.
