= Robert Austen =

Robert Austen may refer to:

- Robert Austen (1642–1696), MP for Winchelsea
- Robert Austen (c. 1672–1728), MP for Winchelsea and Hastings
- Sir Robert Austen, 1st Baronet (1587–1666), Austen baronet and one-time owner of Hall Place
- Sir Robert Austen, 3rd Baronet (1664–1706), English politician
- Sir Robert Austen, 4th Baronet (1697–1743), MP for New Romney
- Robert Austen (priest) (1723–1792), archdeacon of Cork

== See also ==
- Robert Austin (disambiguation)
- Bobby Austin (disambiguation)
- Robert Alfred Cloyne Godwin-Austen (1808–1884), English geologist
