= Senator Austin =

Senator Austin may refer to:

- C. G. Austin (1846–1925), Washington State Senate
- Henry W. Austin (1864–1947), Illinois State Senate
- Jonathan L. Austin (1748–1826), Massachusetts State Senate
- Warren Austin (1877–1962), U.S. Senator from Vermont from 1931 to 1946
- William H. Austin (1859–1922), Wisconsin State Senate
- William Austin (American writer) (1778–1841), Massachusetts State Senate
