= Robert Austin =

Robert Austin may refer to:

- Robert Austin (explorer) (1825–1905), explorer of Australia
- Robert Austin (artist) (1895–1973), British artist and printmaker
- Robert Austin (Oxford University cricketer) (1871–1958), English cricketer
- Robert Austin (divine) (1592/93–?), Puritan theologian and divine
- Robert Austin (judge), judge of the Supreme Court of New South Wales
- Robert Austin (trade unionist) (1826–1891), British trade unionist
- Robert Hamilton Austin (born 1946), American physicist
- Robert D. Austin (born 1962), innovation and technology management researcher and professor

== See also ==
- Rob Austin (born 1981), English racing driver
- Bobby Austin (disambiguation)
- Robert Austen (disambiguation)
