= Justice Austin =

Justice Austin may refer to:

- Aaron Austin (1745–1829), judge of the Connecticut Supreme Court of Errors
- Benjamin H. Austin (1832–1885), associate justice of the Supreme Court of the Kingdom of Hawaii
- Henry William Austin (1825–1893), chief justice of the Bahamas
- James W. Austin (1829–1895), associate justice of the Supreme Court of the Kingdom of Hawaii
