= General Austin =

General Austin may refer to:

- Fred Thaddeus Austin (1866–1938), U.S. Army major general
- Herbert Henry Austin (1868–1937), British Army brigadier general
- Hudson Austin (1938–2022), Grenadian People's Revolutionary Army general
- Lloyd Austin (born 1953), U.S. Army four-star general
- Richard G. Austin (politician) (born 1948), Adjutant General of Illinois
- Staryl C. Austin (1920–2015), U.S. Air Force brigadier general
