= Charles Austin =

Charles Austin may refer to:

- Charles Austin (lawyer) (1799–1874), English lawyer
- Charles Austin (politician), mayor of Tallahassee, Florida, in 1831
- Charles Austin (comedian) (1878–1944), English music hall comedian
- Charles P. Austin (1883–1948), American painter
- Charles Austin (rugby union) (1892–1980), American rugby union player and coach
- Charles Austin (journalist) (1944–2018), American journalist
- Chuck Austin, American professional wrestler
- Charles Austin (high jumper) (born 1967), American athlete
- Charlie Austin (born 1989), English footballer

== See also ==
- Charles Austen (1779–1852), Royal Naval admiral and brother of Jane Austen, novelist
- Chuck Austen, American comic book writer and artist
