= Henry Austin =

Henry Austin may refer to:

- Henry A. Austin (1833–1911), Canadian merchant and political figure in New Brunswick
- Henry W. Austin Sr. (1828–1889), American businessman and politician
- Henry W. Austin (1864–1947), American politician and businessman
- Henry William Austin (1825–1893), Canadian lawyer and chief justice of the Bahamas
- Henry Austin (Indian politician) (1920–2008), Indian politician and ambassador
- Henry Austin (MP) (fl. 1410–1413), member of parliament for Totnes
- Henry Austin (baseball) (1844–1904), American baseball player
- Bunny Austin (Henry Wilfred Austin, 1906–2000), English tennis player
- Henry Austin (architect) (1804–1891), American architect
- Henry Austin (poet), English poet
- Henry Austin (Texas settler) (1782–1852)
- Henry Adrian Austin (born 1972), Barbadian cricketer
- Henry Fitzherbert Austin (1874–1957), Barbadian cricketer
- Henry de Bruno Austin (1791–1869), English property developer

== See also ==
- Harry Austin (1892–1968), English cricketer
- Henry Austen (disambiguation)
