= Harriet Austin =

Harriet Austin may refer to:

- Harriet Austin (rower) (born 1988), New Zealand rower
- Harriet Bunker Austin (1843–1904), American author
- Harriet N. Austin (1826–1891), American physician
