= Ray Austin =

Ray or Raymond Austin may refer to:

- W. Ray Austin (1888–1962), American pharmacist and member of the New York State Assembly
- Raymond Austin (baseball) (fl. 1930–1932), Negro league baseball player
- Ray Austin (director) (1932–2023), British television director and stuntman
- Raymond D. Austin, American Navajo scholar and judge
- Ray Austin (boxer) (born 1970), American professional boxer
- Ray Austin (American football) (born 1974), American football player
