= Thomas Austin =

Thomas Austin may refer to:

- Thomas Austin (pastoralist) (1815–1871), English settler who introduced rabbits into Australia
- Thomas Austin (American football) (born 1986), former American football center
- Thomas Austin (cricketer) (1857–1941), New Zealand cricketer
- Thomas Austin (Ohio politician), American politician from Ohio
- Thomas Austin (civil servant) (1887–1976), British civil servant of the Indian civil service
- Tom Austin (politician) (1923–2002), Australian politician
- Thomas E. Austin, American engineer serving as 13th Architect of the Capitol
- Thomas Austin (field hockey) (born 2007), Scottish field hockey player

== See also ==
- Thomas Austen (1775–1859), British soldier and MP for West Kent
- Austin Thomas (1939–2018), Aruban fencer
