= Henry Austen =

Henry Austen may refer to:

- Henry Thomas Austen (1771–1850), one-time militia officer, then clergyman, brother of Jane Austen
- Henry Haversham Godwin-Austen (1834–1923), English topographer, geologist and surveyor
- Henry Austen, brother-in-law of Charles Dickens and co-worker of Edwin Chadwick

== See also ==
- Henry Austin (disambiguation)
