= Edward Austin =

Edward Austin may refer to:

- Edward Austin (cricketer) (1847–1891), English cricketer
- Edward Austin (politician) (1875–1940), Australian politician
- Edward Oramel Austin (1825–1909) American pioneer
- Ed Austin (1926–2011), American attorney and politician
- Ned Austin (1925–2007), American actor
- Edward Austin Kent (1854–1912), American architect
- Edward Austin Sheldon (1823–1897), American educator
