= Samuel Austin =

Samuel Austin may refer to:

- Samuel Austin (artist) (1796–1834), English painter
- Samuel Austin (poet) or Samuel Austin the elder, English religious poet
- Samuel Austin the younger (died c. 1665), poetical writer
- Samuel Austin (soldier) (1829–1903), recipient of the New Zealand Cross
- Sam Austin (born 1996), English footballer
