= Helen Austin =

Helen Austin may refer to:

- Helen Cloud Austin, American social worker
- Helen Elsie Austin (1908–2004), American lawyer and diplomat
- Helen Vickroy Austin (1829–1921), American journalist and horticulturist
