= Frank Austin =

Frank Austin may refer to:

- Frank Austin (footballer) (1933–2004), English footballer
- Frankie Austin (1917–1960), Panamanian baseball player
- Frank Austin and the Frost brothers
- Frank P. Austin (1937–2002), interior designer and antique dealer
- Frank Austin (actor) (1877–1954), American actor
- Frank Austin (artist) (1937–2017), Navajo American painter and textile artist
- Frank Lyman Austin (1874–1942), American architect
- Frank Austin, pseudonym for Max Brand (Frederick Schiller Faust, 1892–1944)

== See also ==
- Francis Austin (disambiguation)
- Francis Austen (1774–1865), Royal Navy officer
