= Ben Austin (disambiguation) =

Ben Austin (born 1980) is an Australian athlete.

Benjamin or Ben Austin may also refer to:

- Ben Austin (sailor) (born 1982), Australian sailor
- Benjamin Fish Austin (1850–1933), Canadian educator, Methodist minister, and spiritualist
- Benjamin H. Austin (1832–1885), Justice of the Territorial Supreme Court of Hawaii

== See also ==
- Benjamin Austen, see Austen Henry Layard
