= Gerald Austin (disambiguation) =

Gerald, Gerry, or Jerry Austin may refer to:

== Sportspeople ==
- Gerald Austin (born 1941), former American football official in the National Football League
- Gerald Austin (cricketer) (1875–1959), New Zealand cricketer
- Gerry Austin (soccer), manager of Fredericksburg Lady Gunners

== Others ==
- Gerry Austin, fictional character in the film Goodbye Pork Pie
- Jerry Austin of Cannonball (TV series)
- Jerry Austin (actor) in Saratoga Trunk
- Jerry Austin, namesake of Austin Valley, Antarctica
