= Stephen Austin (disambiguation) =

Stephen F. Austin (1793–1836) was an American empresario known as the "Father of Texas."

Stephen Austin or Steven Austin may also refer to:

== People ==
- Stephen Austin (American football), former NFL executive
- Steven Kent Austin, American actor, film producer and director

== Schools ==
- Stephen F. Austin State University, a university in Texas
- Stephen F. Austin Elementary School, Fort Worth
- Stephen F. Austin High School (Houston)
- Stephen F. Austin High School (Austin, Texas)
- Stephen F. Austin High School (Fort Bend County, Texas)
- Stephen F. Austin High School (El Paso, Texas)

== See also ==
- Austin Stevens (born 1950), South African-born Australian naturalist, documentarian and author
- Steve Austin (disambiguation)
