= Elizabeth Austin =

Elizabeth Austin may refer to:

- Elizabeth Austin (writer) (born 1958), American writer
- Elizabeth Austin (soprano) (c. 1800–?), English opera singer and actress
- Elizabeth R. Austin (born 1938), American organist and composer
- Elizabeth Austin (Australian pioneer) (1821–1910), Australian pioneer and philanthropist
- Elizabeth Jean Austin (born 1964), CEO and founder of WeatherExtreme Ltd.
- Beth Austin, a character in This Woman Is Dangerous
