= Frederick Austin (disambiguation) =

Frederick Austin (1902–1990) was a British painter.

Frederick Austin may also refer to:

- Fred Thaddeus Austin (1866–1938), American military officer
- Frederic Austin (1872–1952), English baritone singer
