= Michael Austin =

Michael Austin may refer to:

- Michael W. Austin (born 1969), American philosopher
- Michael Phillip Austin, Australian environmentalist
- Michael Allen Austin (born 1965), American illustrator
- Michael Austin (writer) (born 1966), American academic and critic of Mormon literature
- Mick Austin, British artist
- Michael Austin (politician) (1855–1916), Member of Parliament for West Limerick
- Sir Michael Austin (1927–1995), 5th Baronet, of the Austin baronets
- Michael Austin (singer)
- Michael Austin (screenwriter), see Academy Award for Best Writing
- Michael Austin (journalist) (born 1995), conservative columnist/reporter with The Western Journal

== See also ==
- Mike Austin (disambiguation)
- Michael Austen (born 1964), South African cricketer
