= Jeff Austin =

Jeff(ery) or Geoff(rey) Austin may refer to:

- Jeff Austin (musician) (1974–2019), American musician
- Jeff Austin (baseball) (born 1976), American Major League Baseball pitcher
- Jeff Austin (tennis) (born 1951), American former tennis player
- Geoffrey Austin (1837–1902), English Army officer and cricketer
- Jeffery Austin (born 1991), American musician

== See also ==
- Geoff Austen (born 1953), Australian rules footballer
