= Arthur Austin =

Arthur Austin may refer to:

- Arthur W. Austin (1807–1884), American attorney and government official
- Arthur Austin (cricketer) (1873–1962), Guyanese cricketer
- Arthur O. Austin (1879–1964), American electrical engineer and inventor.
- Arthur E. Austin (1891–1976), member of the Wisconsin State Assembly
- Arthur Everett Austin Jr. (1900–1957), director of the Wadsworth Atheneum
- Arthur Austin (water polo) (1902–1962), American water polo player
