= Valer Austin =

Permaculturalist in Arizona

Valer Clark Austin is a permaculturalist involved with desert greening. Based in southern Arizona, she is known for promoting ecological restoration through water conservation and holistic land management.

Valer is a graduate of Hollins University, from which she received the Hollins Distinguished Alumnae Award in June 2012.

Valer later married to Josiah Austin. The Austin’s have invested time and resources into the restoration of the watersheds in the Sonoran Desert region for the purposes of maintaining free open spaces and promotion of biodiversity. Their restoration efforts began with a 40-mile stretch which encompassed the El Coronado and Bar Boot Ranches. Acknowledging their important efforts, they began to grow their operation for the restoration of wetlands on a broader scale, such as, the borderland regions between the United States and Mexico.

In the 1990s, the couple founded the Cuenca Los Ojos Foundation, which translates to "Watershed of the Springs", based at their El Coronado Ranch. The foundation encompassed various educators, scientists, ranchers in the area, and government agencies to restore and maintain the grasslands in the area, as well as, restore the habitats and biodiversity

Notable Achievements include:

- Protection of over 130,000 acres in Mexico
- Construction of 50 large gabions, 40,000 loose rock dams and 1000+ berms in Mexico and the United States
- Restoration of the Coues Deer and Gould’s turkey in the Chiricahua Mountains, Arizona
- Restoration of 5,000 acres of grasslands in Mexico with native vegetation

Their work has been recognized by the United States Fish and Wildlife Service and the United States Geological Survey. as well as The Nature Conservancy. In addition, Austin has served on the advisory board for the Borderlands Research Institute for Natural Resource Management at Sul Ross State University, located in the Big Bend region of West Texas. In 2008, Valer and Josiah Austin were awarded the landowner stewardship award for their work at El Coronado Ranch. In 2021, Austin was recognized for her distinguished contributions to her field globally, while cultivating Tucson’s sense of place will be honored at the Museum of Contemporary Art Tucson’s 2021 Gala and Local Genius Awards

== See also ==
- Boulder Gardens
- Al Baydha Project
