= Hancock, Vermont =

- Town
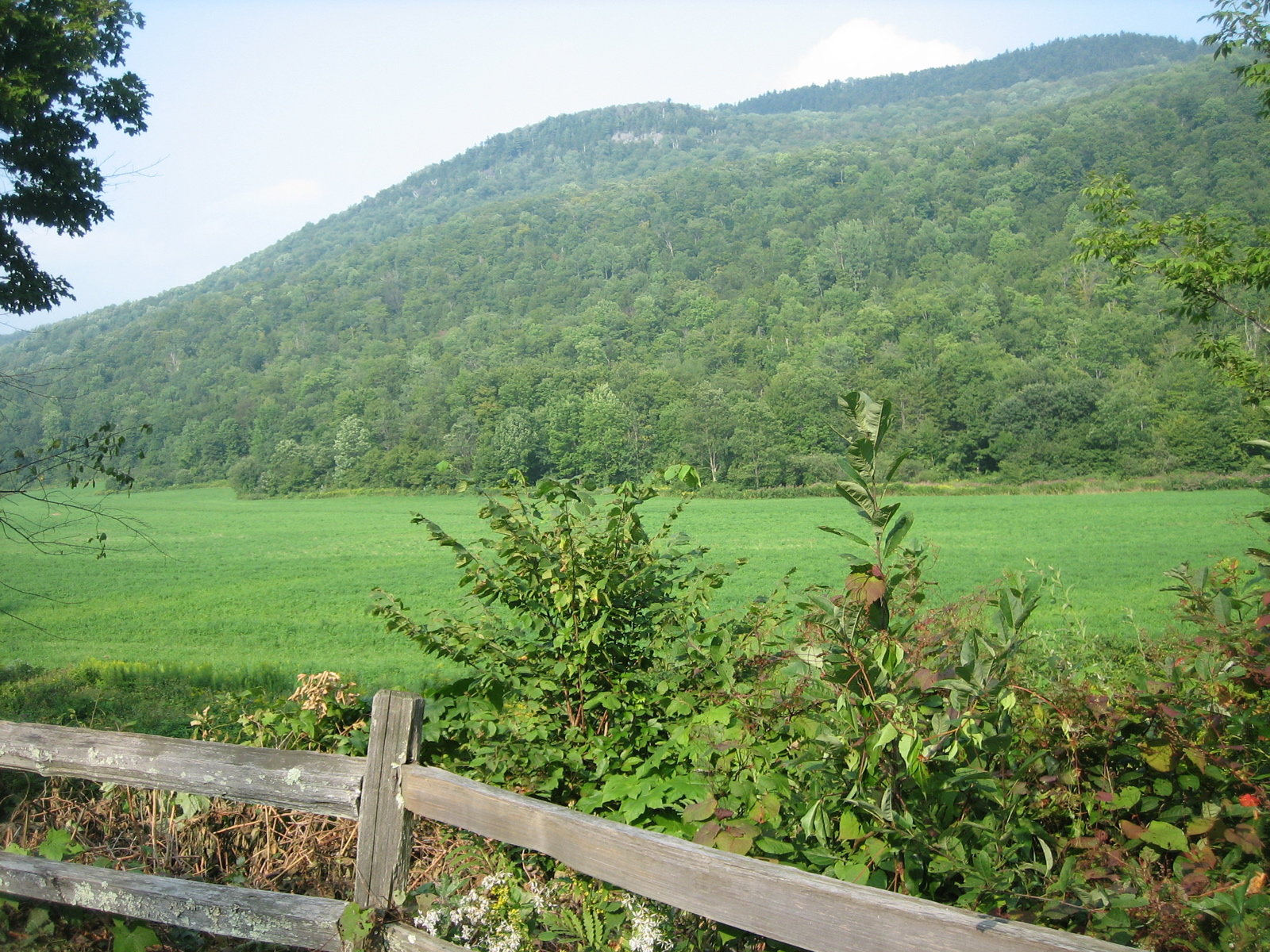
- Hancock Overlook

- Location in Addison County and the state of Vermont
- Coordinates: 43°53′35″N 72°54′27″W
- Country: United States
- State: Vermont
- County: Addison

Area
  - Total: 38.1 sq mi (98.8 km^{2})
  - Land: 38.0 sq mi (98.5 km^{2})
  - Water: 0.12 sq mi (0.3 km^{2})
- Elevation: 2,031 ft (619 m)

Population (2020)
  - Total: 359
  - Density: 9.3/sq mi (3.6/km^{2})
- Time zone: UTC-5 (Eastern (EST))
  - Summer (DST): UTC-4 (EDT)
- ZIP code: 05748
- Area code: 802
- FIPS code: 50-31525
- GNIS feature ID: 1462114
- Website: www.hancockvt.org

Hancock is a town in Addison County, Vermont, United States. The town was named for John Hancock. The population was 359 at the 2020 census. Hancock is home to the Middlebury College Snow Bowl and contains Middlebury Gap through the Green Mountains.

Hancock was one of thirteen Vermont towns isolated by flooding caused by Hurricane Irene in 2011.

== Geography ==
Hancock is located in eastern Addison County, extending from the crest of the Green Mountains in the west to the valley of the White River in the east. The village of Hancock lies along the White River at the confluence of the Hancock Branch from Middlebury Gap. Vermont Route 100 leads north-south through the town, following the White River, leading north into Granville and Warren, and south into Rochester and Stockbridge. Vermont Route 125 leaves Route 100 in Hancock village and leads west, across Middlebury Gap (elevation 2,144 ft or 653 m) into Ripton and Middlebury. The Middlebury College Snow Bowl, a downhill ski area, is on the western side of Middlebury Gap. The Long Trail follows the crest of the Green Mountains in the western part of Hancock, crossing the summit of Worth Mountain (3,234 ft or 986 m) and reaching the summit of Boyce Mountain (3,323 ft or 1,013 m) a few feet north of the town boundary in Ripton. Texas Falls is a scenic waterfall on Hancock Branch that can be reached by road and has a Green Mountain National Forest recreation area nearby.

According to the United States Census Bureau, Hancock has a total area of 38.1 square miles (98.8 km^{2}), of which 38.0 square miles (98.5 km^{2}) is land and 0.12 square miles (0.3 km^{2}), or 0.28%, is water.

== Demographics ==
Historical population
Census	Pop.	Note	%±
1790	56		—
1800	149		166.1%
1810	311		108.7%
1820	442		42.1%
1830	472		6.8%
1840	455		−3.6%
1850	430		−5.5%
1860	448		4.2%
1870	430		−4.0%
1880	382		−11.2%
1890	283		−25.9%
1900	253		−10.6%
1910	287		13.4%
1920	300		4.5%
1930	303		1.0%
1940	371		22.4%
1950	391		5.4%
1960	323		−17.4%
1970	283		−12.4%
1980	334		18.0%
1990	340		1.8%
2000	382		12.4%
2010	323		−15.4%
2020	359		11.1%
U.S. Decennial Census

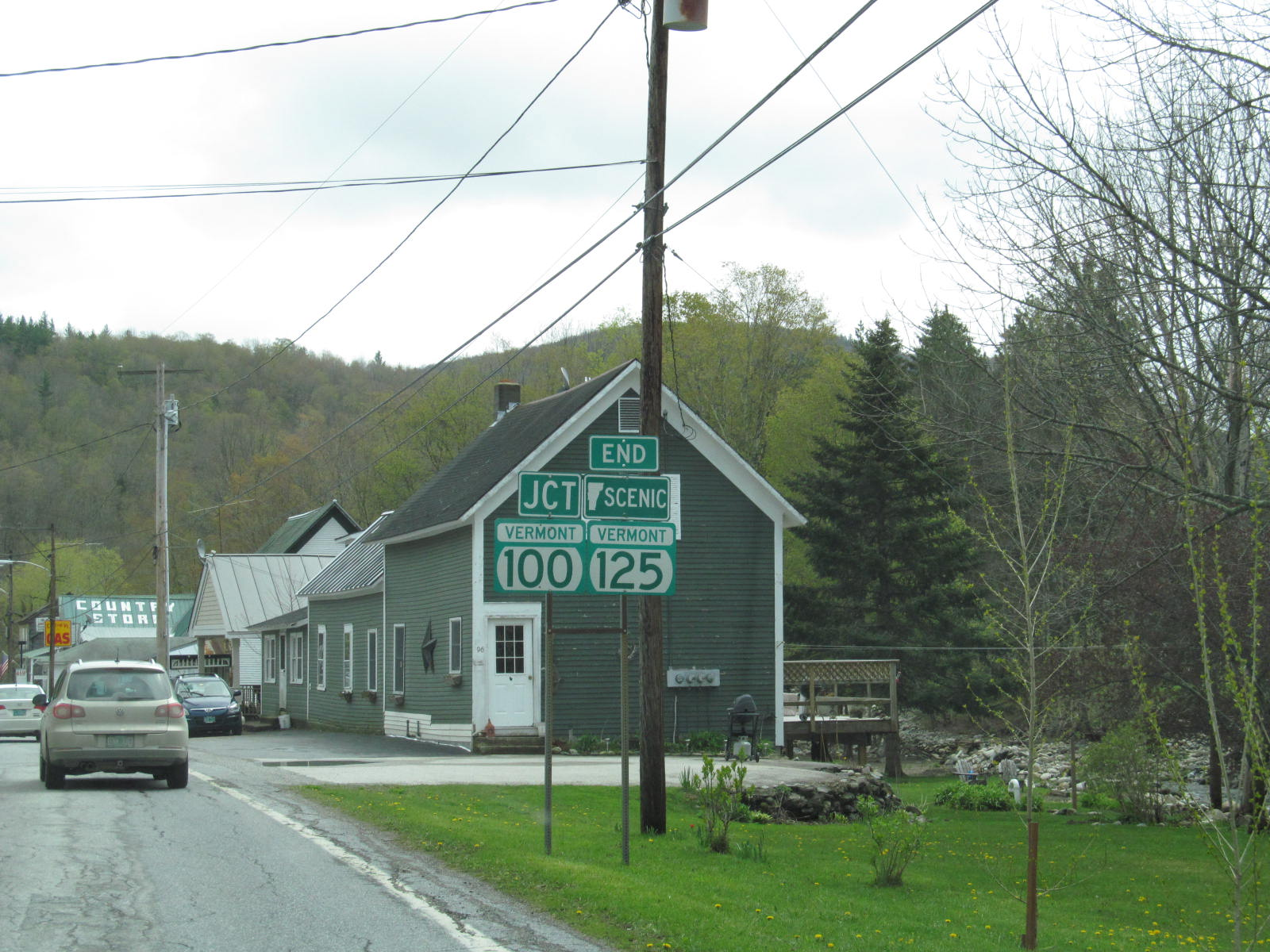
Junction of VT 125 and VT 100 at Hancock village

As of the census of 2000, there were 382 people, 164 households, and 112 families residing in the town. The population density was 9.9 people per square mile (3.8/km^{2}). There were 214 housing units at an average density of 5.6 per square mile (2.1/km^{2}). The racial makeup of the town was 96.60% White, 0.52% Native American, 0.79% Asian, 0.52% from other races, and 1.57% from two or more races. Hispanic or Latino of any race were 0.79% of the population.

There were 164 households, out of which 27.4% had children under the age of 18 living with them, 54.9% were married couples living together, 7.3% had a female householder with no husband present, and 31.1% were non-families. 28.0% of all households were made up of individuals, and 10.4% had someone living alone who was 65 years of age or older. The average household size was 2.33 and the average family size was 2.77.

In the town, the age distribution of the population shows 20.9% under the age of 18, 7.3% from 18 to 24, 27.0% from 25 to 44, 29.3% from 45 to 64, and 15.4% who were 65 years of age or older. The median age was 42 years. For every 100 females, there were 114.6 males. For every 100 females age 18 and over, there were 108.3 males.

The median income for a household in the town was $29,583, and the median income for a family was $40,000. Males had a median income of $24,531 versus $21,875 for females. The per capita income for the town was $16,255. About 6.6% of families and 8.4% of the population were below the poverty line, including 10.4% of those under age 18 and 7.8% of those age 65 or over.

Hancock is home to Camp Killooleet, which adds roughly 150 people to the population every summer.

== Notable people ==
- Fred Thaddeus Austin, United States Army major general, born and raised in Hancock
- Jeremiah Ingalls, composer, lived in Hancock
- Rebecca Hammond Lard, poet, lived in Hancock
