= David Austin =

David Austin may refer to:

- David C. H. Austin (1926–2018), rose breeder and author
- David J. C. Austin (1958–2026), rose breeder and businessman
- David Austin (American football), former head football coach for Middlebury College
- David Austin (cartoonist) (1935–2005), who worked for The Guardian and Private Eye
- David Austin (singer) (born 1962), British singer

== See also ==
- David Austen, English cricketer
