= Richard Austin =

Richard or Rick Austin may refer to:

== Law and politics ==
- Richard W. Austin (1857–1919), United States Representative for Tennessee
- Richard B. Austin (1901–1977), United States federal judge
- Richard H. Austin (1913–2001), African American politician, Secretary of State of Michigan
- Richard G. Austin (politician) (born 1948), politician from Illinois
- Rick Austin (politician) (born 1966), Georgia State Representative

== Sports ==
- Richard G. Austin (weightlifter) (1931–2020), American weightlifter
- Rick Austin (baseball) (born 1946), American baseball player
- Richard Austin (cricketer) (1954–2015), West Indian cricketer

== Others ==
- Richard Austin (colonist) (1598–1645), came to Massachusetts colony on Bevis in 1638
- Richard Austin (punchcutter) (1756–1832), British punchcutter
- Richard Austin (conductor) (1903–1989), British orchestra conductor
- Richard Cartwright Austin (born 1934), American writer and environmental theologian
- Victor Milán (1954–2018), American science fiction writer, used the pseudonym Richard Austin
