= Elizabeth Jean Austin =

American physicist

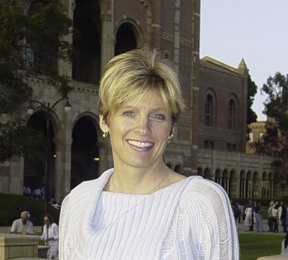
- Born: Elizabeth Jean Williams; May 1964 (age 60); New York, New York, U.S.
- Occupation: Atmospheric physicist
- Years active: 1994–present
- Employer: WeatherExtreme Ltd.
- Spouse: Alan Austin
- Children: 1
- Father: Patrick Williams

Elizabeth Austin is CEO and Founder of WeatherExtreme Ltd., a research and consulting firm.

== Biography ==
Austin founded WeatherExtreme Ltd. in 1994. She has held professor/research positions at the Desert Research Institute, Inc. and Sierra Nevada College, a four-year, private college in Incline Village, Nevada. She currently holds a Professorship at the University of Nevada, Reno’s Atmospheric Sciences Department. Austin has been an active member of the National Weather Association for many years, she is an active member of the American Meteorological Society (AMS), has served on many AMS Committees and was Chair of the Board of the Certified Consulting Meteorologists (CCM). She is currently a member of the AMS Executive Council and President of the Association of Certified Meteorologists.

== Career ==
Austin is the recipient of a Fulbright Senior Specialist award at the Laboratoire de Physique de l’Atmosphère, CNRS, Universitè de La Rèunion, Rèunion Island, France and the distinguished teaching award at the four-year Sierra Nevada College in Incline Village Nevada. She is the chief scientist for the Perlan Project to fly a manned glider to 100,000 feet. Her areas of specialty include forensic meteorology, aviation meteorology, mountain weather, mesoscale atmospheric modeling, cloud and ice physics, education, and stratospheric mountain waves. Austin has appeared on-air all over the world (Germany, China, New Zealand, France, Australia and the United States), lectured and taught courses and seminars on weather and climate all over the world.

Austin’s forensic meteorology experience has ranged from civil to criminal cases including a double-murder, death-penalty case; to State and Federal cases; to foreign court cases. She has worked on well over 1,500 cases ranging from aviation, wildfires, auto accidents, agriculture, kite-surfing, boating, equipment malfunctions, avalanches, skiing accidents, and tornadoes.

=== Author ===
Austin’s book, Treading on Thin Air, was released (April 25, 2016), and is published by Pegasus Books.

== Awards and honors ==
- American Meteorological Society Fellow (elected July 2017): Fellows shall have made outstanding contributions to the atmospheric or related oceanic or hydrologic sciences or their applications during a substantial period of time. New Fellows are elected from not more than two-tenths of one percent of all AMS members
- Fulbright Senior Specialist, Laboratoire de Physique de l’Atmosphère, CNRS, Universitè de La Rèunion, Rèunion Island, France (May 5–25, 2003)
- United Nations Development Program Invited Speaker, International Skiing Industry Cooperation Forum, Harbin City, People’s Republic of China (December 2001)
- Certified Consulting Meteorologist (#572), American Meteorological Society
- Distinguished Teaching Award, Sierra Nevada College (1996–97)
- First Place, Peter B. Wagner Memorial Scholarship, Atmospheric Sci. Center, Desert Research Institute
- Excellence in Teaching, Sierra Nevada College, Elected Member

=== Professional activities ===
- American Meteorological Society Executive Council Elected Member (January 2018-January 2020
- American Meteorological Society Council Elected Member (January 2017-January 2020)
- President, National Council of Industrial Meteorologists (NCIM), January 2017 – January 2019.
- President-Elect, National Council of Industrial Meteorologists-Association of Certified Meteorologists (NCIM-ACM), June 2015 – January 2019
- WeatherExtreme Ltd. named a NOAA-Weather Ready Nation Ambassador, 2014 – Present.
- Member of advisory committee for Thishan D. Karandana G., Ph.D. Candidate, Atmospheric Sciences Department, University of Nevada, Reno., 2017 – Present.
- Member of advisory committee s for Master’s and Ph.D. Students at the University of Nevada, Reno, Atmospheric Science Department and the University of California, Berkeley, School of Journalism.
- Chair of the Board of Certified Consulting Meteorologists (BCCM), American Meteorological Society, January 2012 – January 2013.
- Board of Certified Consulting Meteorologists (BCCM), American Meteorological Society, Jan. 11, 2009 – January 2013.
- Chair & Organizer, American Meteorological Society Annual Meeting Short Course on Forensic Meteorology, AMS Annual Meeting, January 22, 2012.
- Chair, American Meteorological Society Annual Meeting Session ‘Urban High-Impact Weather Forecasting’, January 14, 2009.
- Mountain Meteorology Committee Member, Feb. 1, 2003-Jan. 31, 2006 (American Meteorological Soc.)
- National Research Council & National Academies: Board on Atmospheric Sciences & Climate, Weather Research for Surface Transportation (elected member March 2003-March 2004)
- Continuing Education Committee Member, Jan. 11, 2004-Jan. 31, 2007 (American Meteorological Soc.)
- American Meteorological Society, Elected Member
- National Council of Industrial Meteorologists, Elected Member
- Research Article Peer Reviewer for: Journal of Applied Meteorology
- Regional Editor: Weather Watch Magazine (1996-1997)
- Research proposal and grant Peer Reviewer for the Australian Research Council
- Sigma Xi, The Scientific Research Society, Elected Full Member
- American Geophysical Union, Member
- National Weather Association, Member

== Filmography ==
Austin appeared in The Weather Channel Documentary: Dead of Winter: The Donner Party (2015).

== Personal life ==
Austin currently resides in Incline Village, Lake Tahoe, Nevada, with her husband, former helicopter and jet pilot, photographer and filmmaker, Alan Austin and their son. She is the daughter of Award-winning film composer, Patrick Williams
