= Florence Austin =

American violinist

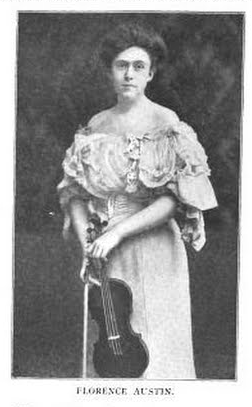
- Austin from a 1908 publication

Background information
- Born: March 11, 1884; Galesburg, Michigan
- Died: September 1, 1927 (aged 43); Fairchild, Wisconsin
- Genres: Classical
- Occupation(s): Concert performer, violin teacher
- Instrument: Violin

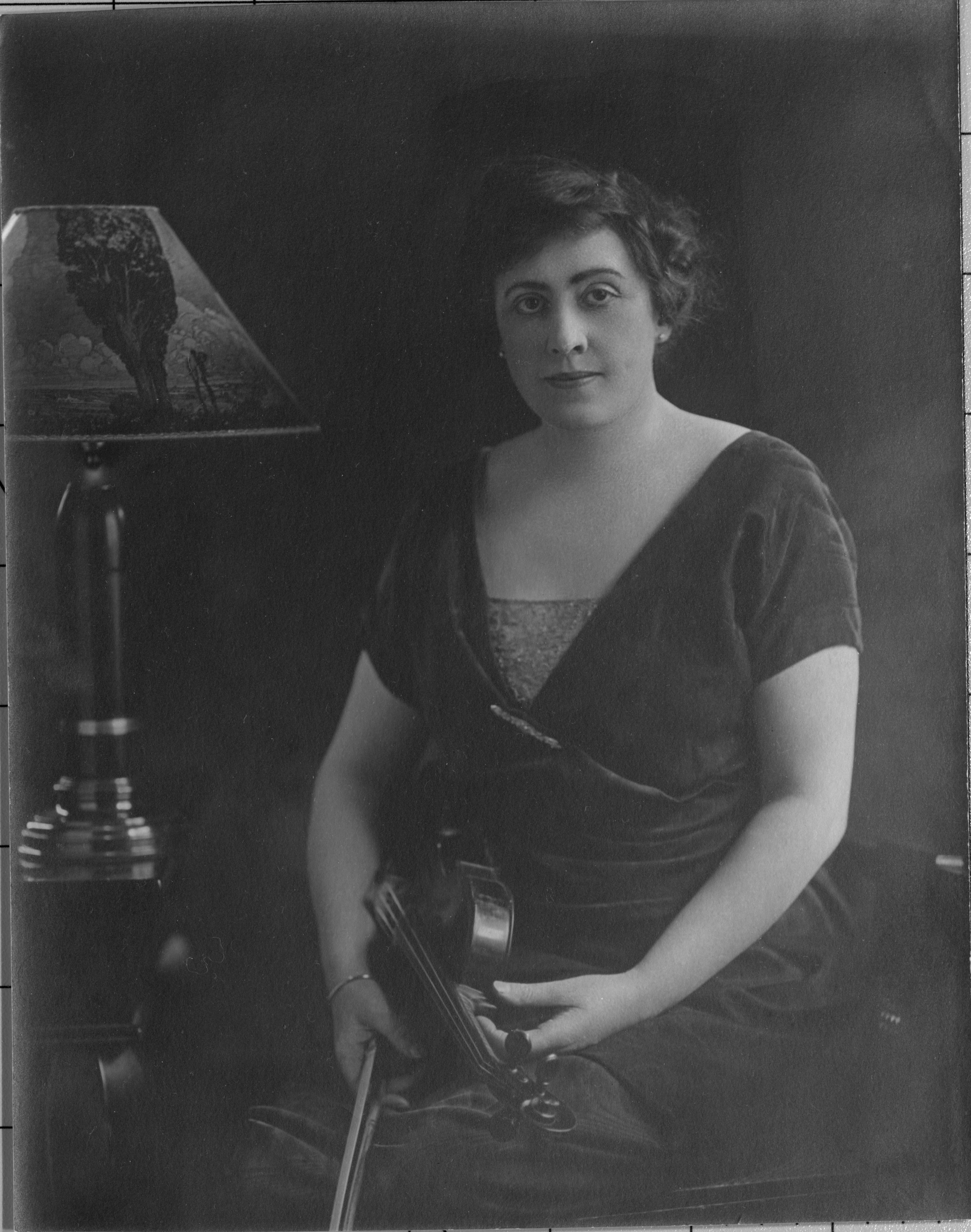
Austin in 1925

Florence Austin (March 11, 1884 – September 1, 1927) was an American violinist.

== Early life and education ==
Austin was born in Galesburg, Michigan, the daughter of Edward Eldee Austin and Ella J. Austin. Her father was a surgeon and medical school professor; her sister Marion became an organist and composer under the name M. Austin Dunn.

Austin began studying the violin in Minneapolis at age seven, and went to New York at age 14. There, she studied for several years under Henry Schradieck (1846–1918) and Camilla Urso (1840–1902). She concluded her musical studies under Ovide Musin (1854–1929), with whom she went abroad to enter the Royal Conservatory at Liège (Belgium), under his instruction. The following year she received the first prize in the violin contest with the largest number of competitors in the history of that institute. She received the medal from Eugène Ysaÿe, who was one of the judges.

== Career ==
After her graduation from the Liège Conservatory, she made a successful European debut, followed by performances throughout the United States, including as a member of the Women's String Quartet. She made a coast-to-coast tour in 1910 and 1911. In 1914, she played to acclaim at the Maine Music Festival; later in 1914, she gave a recital at New York's Aeolian Hall. She made another Western tour for the 1916-1917 concert season. In 1920, she toured in a trio with a soprano and a pianist, sponsored by the National Society for Broader Education. Her sister sometimes accompanied her on piano. In 1922, after the sisters performed together in Minneapolis, a reviewer noted Florence Austin's "large and beautiful tone, artistic phrasing, and ample technic".

She was selected by Ovide Musin to serve at the head of the violin department of the “Musin Virtuoso School” of Newark. Her students gave a recital at Aeolian Hall in 1908.

== Personal life ==
Austin died in 1927 in a railroad accident in Fairchild, Wisconsin, aged 43 years.
