= Albert Austin (disambiguation) =

Albert Austin (1881–1953) was a British-American actor.

Albert Austin may also refer to:

- Albert E. Austin (1877–1942), American politician
- Albert "Pompey" Austin (1846–1889), Australian footballer
- Albert William Austin (1857–1934), Canadian businessman and golfer
