= Ken Austin =

Ken Austin may refer to:

- Ken Austin (cricketer) (1908–2004), Rhodesian cricketer
- Ken Austin (inventor) (born 1957), chairman of Inview Technology Ltd
- Ken Austin (basketball) (born 1961), American basketball player
- Ken Austin (politician) (1915–1986), Australian politician
- Kenneth Darrell Austin (born 1951), former professional American football offensive lineman

== See also ==
- Kenneth Austen (born c. 1941), British armed robber and prison breaker
