= Valerie Austin =

British hypnotherapist (born 1946)

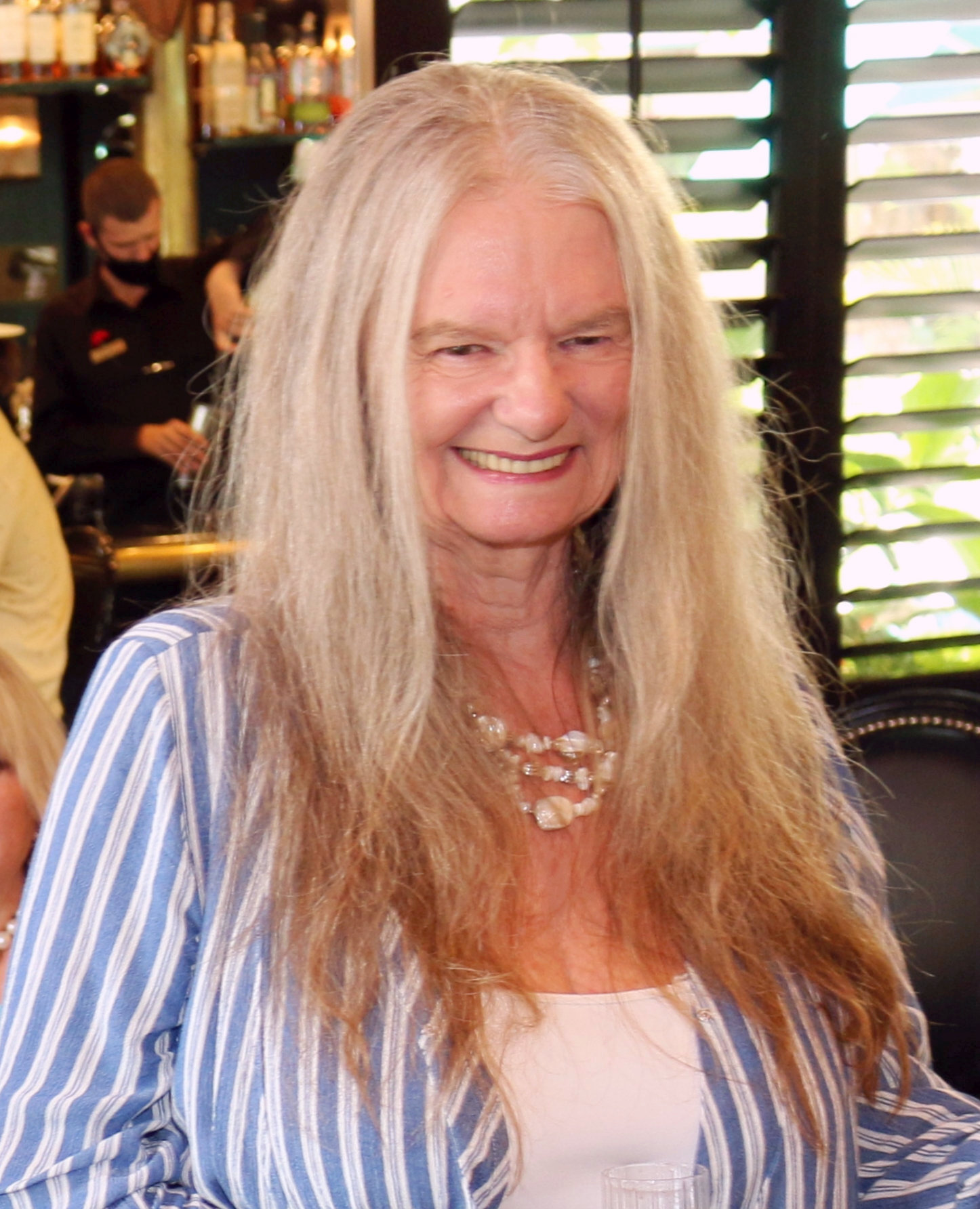
- Born: 10 August 1946 (age 80); Blackpool, Lancashire, England
- Known for: Originated first Stop Smoking in One Hour programme

Valerie Austin (born in Blackpool, Lancashire) is an English hypnotherapist, trainer, lecturer, author and journalist.

== Hypnotherapy career ==
A near-fatal accident on a motorway left Austin with hysterical amnesia (severe memory loss).

While in Los Angeles she was invited to join a course on hypnosis by Hollywood hypnotist Gil Boyne. He was hypnotising her in front of the class when his secretary dashed in and said President Ronald Reagan had been shot. At this point Valerie had just regained her memory.

However, during one of her trips back to the UK a number of family deaths, including her mother's accidents and trauma triggered her memory loss again. She forgot she was married, did not return to the US or her husband and spent the next four years with a return of her memory problems. Some years later she regained her memory for the second time with hypnosis and then started to take a greater interest in the subject.

She took a course in hypnotherapy, and built a career of over 30 years.

Austin opened her Harley Street practice in 1989. She was the UK's first celebrity hypnotherapist overcome many different addictions, phobias, obsessions and bad habits.

Austin was the first hypnotherapist to coin the term Stop Smoking in One Hour with the programme she developed in 1989. She claims a 95% success rate for her programme.

Austin developed her own technique, The Austin Technique, to treat conditions including weight loss, relationship issues and stress.

Austin and her husband, James Pool practise and teach medical hypnosis. Austin and Pool, trained with surgeon Dr Jack Stanley Gibson, who used hypnosis in over 3,000 operations. Austin also practices Nth Phase, a very deep trance akin to hibernation, in which the body needs two breaths a minute.

Austin has used her previous experience as a successful salesperson with hypnosis to establish herself as a motivational psychologist to promote productivity in sales forces and reduce stress.

Austin has trained hypnotherapists in her techniques since 1990.

She taught a seven-day course at the University Kebangsaan, Malaysia. The Health Minister of Malaysia, Datuk Lee Kim Sai, presented graduates with their certificates.

Since 1990 Austin has appeared regularly in both the tabloid and broadsheet British national press and lifestyle magazines including The Mirror, Daily Express, The Evening Standard, The Guardian., The Telegraph, CityAm, New Woman, Cheshire Life and CityWealth Magazine. Her work has also gained international press coverage.

== Publications ==
Austin has written eight self hypnosis books:

- Self Hypnosis, Thorsons: 1992. ISBN 0-7225-2924-4
- Slim While You Sleep, Blake Publishing: 1995. ISBN 1-85782-110-6
- Hypnosex, Thorsons: 1996. ISBN 0-7225-3335-7
- Free Yourself From Fear, Thorsons: 1998. ISBN 0-7225-3553-8
- Stop Smoking in One Hour, Berita Publishing Sdn Bhd (part of the New Straits Times Group): 1997 ISBN 967-969-468-2
- Stop Smoking in One Hour, Blake Publishing: 2000. ISBN 1-85782-441-5
- Self Hypnosis, Hay House: 2015. ISBN 1-78180-499-0
- Self-Hypnosis Made Easy, Hay House: 2018. ISBN 1-78817-246-9

== Personal life ==
She is married to James Pool.
