= Kyle Austin =

American professional basketball player

Kyle Armani Austin (born Oct 18, 1988) is an American professional basketball player currently playing for Club Nacional de Basketball of the Uruguayan Basketball League. He played collegiately at USC and then transferred to UC Riverside. This American basketballer stands at 6 ft 8 in (203 cm) and weighs 200 pounds (91 kg).

== Early life and high school ==
Austin was born to parents Carol Austin and Greg Ware in Pasadena, California. Austin attended Pasadena high school where he went on to be San Gabriel valley player of the year in consecutive seasons. He led his team to the CIF division 2 championship game where they lost in the final to Compton Dominguez. Austin received state player of the year honors becoming one of only two players to do so on the losing team.

== College career ==
Austin signed to University of Southern California where he was given a scholarship made available due to the tragic death of then USC point guard Ryan Francis.

=== UC Riverside ===
Austin then played for UC Riverside.

== Professional career ==
- 2019–present: Uruguay Uruguayan Basketball League – Club Nacional de Basketball
- 2016–2019: Argentine Liga Nacional de Básquet – Hispano Americano de Rio Gallegos
- 2015–16: Italy A2 – Casalpusterlengo
- 2014–15: Italy A2 – Latina Basket
- 2013–14: Italy A2 – Bawer Matera
- 2013: Mexico CIBACOPA – Mineros de Cananea
- 2012–13: Hungary DivA – Kormend
- 2012: Hungary DivA – Jaszberenyi
- 2011: Sweden Basketligan – Boras
- 2011: Évreux – France
- 2011: Belgium – Pepinsteer
- 2010–11: Portual LPB – Vitoria
- 2010: Spain LEB Gold – Palencia

== Awards and honors ==
- Eurobasket Honorable Mention All Italian League 2014
- Eurobasket Hungary Forward of the year 2013
- First Team All Big West 2010
- First Team All Big West 2009
