= George Austin =

George Austin may refer to:

- George Austin (gardener) (fl. 1780), English gardener
- George Austin (priest) (1931–2019), English Anglican priest
- George J. Austin (c. 1881–1930), American military officer, educator

== See also ==
- George Austen (disambiguation)
