= Les Austin =

- Born: Leslie Raymond Austin; 5 December 1936

Rugby union career
- Position: prop
International career
Years	Team	Apps	(Points)
1963	Wallabies	1	(0)

Leslie Raymond Austin (born 5 December 1936) was a rugby union player who represented Australia.

Austin, a prop, claimed 1 international rugby cap for Australia.
