= James Austin =

James Austin may refer to:

== Sports ==
- Jim Austin (baseball) (born 1963), former baseball pitcher
- Jim Austin (rugby league), New Zealand rugby league player
- James Austin (judoka) (born 1983), English judoka
- James Austin (American football) (1913–1995), American football player
- Jimmy Austin (1879–1965), British-American baseball player and coach

== Others ==
- James Austin (businessman) (1813–1897), Canadian businessman in Toronto
- James Austin (musician) (born 1937), American trumpeter and pedagogue
- James Austin (photographer) (born 1940), Australian fine-art and architectural photographer
- James E.B. Austin (1803–1829), Texan settler and brother of Stephen F. Austin, "The Father of Texas"
- James H. Austin, American neurologist, Zen Buddhist, and writer
- James Murdoch Austin (1915–2000), New Zealand-American meteorologist and mathematician
- James T. Austin (1784–1870), 22nd Massachusetts Attorney General
- James W. Austin (1829–1895), Justice of the Supreme Court of the Kingdom of Hawaii
