= Colin Austin =

Colin Austin may refer to:

- Colin Austin (Moldflow) (born 1940), British-born Australian engineer, the founder of Moldflow
- Colin François Lloyd Austin (1941–2010), Australian-born British scholar of ancient Greek authors
