= Robert Austen (priest) =

Irish archdeacon (1723–1792)

Robert Austen (11 July 1723; Cork – 10 November 1792; Cork) was Archdeacon of Cork from 1785 until his death.

Austen was educated at Trinity College, Dublin. He was the incumbent at Athnowen and a prebendary of Cork Cathedral.
