= Kevin Austin =

Kevin Austin may refer to:

- Kevin Austin (footballer) (1973–2018), Trinidad and Tobago footballer
- Kevin Austin Jr. (born 2000), American football wide receiver
