= Preston Austin =

Welsh cricketer, clergyman, and barrister

Preston Austen
Personal information
- Full name: Preston Bruce Austin
- Born: 27 July 1827; Llwydcoed, Glamorgan, Wales
- Died: 7 July 1908 (aged 80); Barbados

Domestic team information
- Years: Team
- 1848: Cambridge University

Career statistics
Competition	First-class
Matches	1
Runs scored	6
Batting average	3.00
100s/50s	0/0
Top score	6
Catches/stumpings	0/–
- Source: Cricinfo, 25 April 2014

Preston Bruce Austin (9 December 1827 – 7 July 1908) was a Welsh clergyman, barrister and cricketer.

== Life ==
He was the third of the family of ten, and second son, of the Rev. Wiltshire Stanton Austin, and brother of Francis Austin. Born at Llwydcoed, Glamorgan, Austin made one first-class cricket appearance for Cambridge University while undertaking studies there. His only appearance came against the Gentlemen of Kent at the St Lawrence Ground in 1848, scoring 6 runs in the match. He later moved to the British West Indies, while living there he stood as an umpire in one first-class cricket match in 1897.

Having attended Trinity Hall, Cambridge, Austin was ordained as a deacon in 1851. After spending time in Germany, he moved to Demerara in British Guiana, during which he was the assistant master of Queen's College, Georgetown, a college which played an important role in establishing cricket in British Guiana. He later moved to Barbados, founding the St. John the Baptist Church in St. James Parish on the island, of which he was rector from 1860 until 1865. Austin later opposed the plans of Barbados governor John Pope Hennessy for a federation of the Windward Islands, which would result in Barbados' self-government. He travelled to London to present a petition of opposition to the Colonial Office. He was the rector of Saint Philip from 1875 to 1880, after which he returned to England having left the church 'under a cloud'. He spent the following twenty years in England, where he was the rector of All Hallows Lombard Street. His wife died in 1900 and he returned to live with one of his sons back in Barbados, where he died in on 7 July 1908. He was buried at St. John the Baptist Church, his grave marked as 'the Founder'. In addition to being a clergyman, Austin was also a barrister.

== Family ==
Austin married on 9 December 1854, in the Cathedral Church of Saint Michael and All Angels, Barbados, Anna Eliza Griffith, daughter of Richard S. Griffith M.D. of Barbados.
