= Philip Austin =

Philip Austin may refer to:

- Philip E. Austin (born 1942), President of the University of Connecticut
- Philip Austin (Gaelic footballer) (born 1986), Irish Gaelic football player
- Phil Austin (1941–2015), comedian and writer

== See also ==
- Phillip Austin (born 1969), British murderer
