= Jonathan Austin =

Jonathan Austin may refer to:

- Jonathan L. Austin (1748–1826), Massachusetts revolutionary, diplomat and politician
- Jonathan Austin (Hawaii official) (1830–1892), Cabinet minister, Kingdom of Hawaii
- Jonathan Luke Austin, political sociologist
