= Richard Cartwright Austin =

American writer/environmental theologian

Richard Cartwright Austin (born 1934 in Cleveland, Ohio) is an American writer and environmental theologian.

== Gaining experience ==
=== Early life ===
Austin was raised in Washington, DC, in a politically active family. He received a Bachelor of Arts from Swarthmore College in 1956, a Master of Divinity from Union Theological Seminary in 1959, and a Doctor of the Science of Theology from San Francisco Theological Seminary in 1975.

=== Pastor and teacher ===
Austin served a five-church Presbyterian parish in a rural mining area of Pennsylvania, then served as associate pastor of the Georgetown Presbyterian Church in Washington DC. In 1966, he was appointed Director of the West Virginia Mountain Project, his denomination's largest Appalachian mission, in the Big Coal River Valley of West Virginia. From 1975 until his retirement in 1999, Austin had a special ministry in Environmental Theology with the Presbyterian Church. His base was a mountain farm in southwestern Virginia, near Dungannon.

In the 1970s and 1980s, Austin spoke to Protestant, Catholic, Evangelical and Eastern Orthodox groups across the United States, and trained young ministers in environmental awareness through the ecumenical Appalachian Ministries Educational Resource Center in Berea, Kentucky. For this work Austin was honored in 1999 by Wilson College with a Doctor of Humane Letters degree.

=== Advocating ===
Austin based his early books on his experiences among Appalachian people advocating against strip mining for coal. Al Gore wrote about Austin's experiences in Earth in the Balance:

Believers are called upon to remember that even as they "till" the earth they must also "keep" it. This has long been clear to ... Richard Cartwright Austin, for example, a Presbyterian minister working among the poor in Appalachia, [who] reports on his experience in trying to stop irresponsible strip mining: "I learned early on from my years as a pastor in Appalachia ... that the only defense those mountains have from exploitation by the energy conglomerates' bulldozers is the poor, isolated people who live in those hollows, who care so deeply that they would fight for that land."

Austin led a campaign to abolish strip mining in West Virginia in 1971, then co-chaired the national coalition Citizens to Abolish Strip Mining that lobbied U.S. Congress to pass anti-strip-mining legislation. President Jimmy Carter signed the Surface Mining Control and Reclamation Act in 1977.

From 1977 to 1982, Austin turned his attention to a more local issue. American Electric Power planned to build America's largest pumped-storage hydroelectric facility at Brumley Gap in southwestern Virginia. Austin led the Coalition of American Electric Consumers that forced American Electric Power to withdraw its plans.

=== Family ===
Austin is married to Anne Leibig, a gestalt psychotherapist. He has three sons from a previous marriage, and six grandchildren.

== Writing career ==
=== Environmental theology ===
Between 1987 and 1990, Austin's four-book series, Environmental Theology, was published by John Knox Press and Creekside Press. Baptized into Wilderness explores the spirituality of John Muir. Beauty of the Lord draws from the American theologian Jonathan Edwards to propose an understanding of beauty that is relational rather than aesthetic, and that strengthens our experiences of God with experiences of nature. Hope for the Land explores Biblical texts that affirm human responsibility to liberate land from oppression. Reclaiming America proposes land reform, civil rights for natural life and new approaches to agriculture.

The author Chris Bolgiano summarized Austin's philosophy in Living in the Appalachian Forest:

Dick therefore sought to rearrange some of the building blocks of Christianity and fashion a Christian perspective of nature that would both strengthen the faith and enhance its moral beauty. Environmental ethics, he believed, would spring from the relationship that natural beauty engenders in those who perceive it. The observer and the object considered beautiful are no longer detached from each other but engage in a potentially meaningful relationship.

=== Moral imagination ===
Austin's second series, Moral Imagination in Industrial Culture, draws upon his family history to explore Christian responses to the challenges of industrialization during the past two centuries. Books in the series include Building Utopia: Erecting Russia's First Modern City, East of Cleveland, Dreams and Depression, and The Measure of All Things. In addition, Austin edited two other books as part of the series: Letters from the Pacific, a Combat Chaplain in World War II and Give God a Flower.
