= Mark Austin =

Mark Austin may refer to:

- Mark Austin (journalist) (born 1958), British journalist
- Mark Austin (footballer) (born 1989), Australian rules footballer
- Mark Austin (composer) (born 1958), New Zealand composer and musical director
