= Terry Austin =

Terry Austin may refer to:

- Terry Austin (footballer) (born 1954), English footballer
- Terry Austin (comics) (born 1952), American comic book artist
- Terry Austin (politician) (born 1955), American politician from Virginia

== See also ==
- Terrence Austin, American football player
