= Steve Austin (disambiguation) =

Stone Cold Steve Austin (born 1964) is an American actor and retired professional wrestler.

Steve Austin may also refer to:

- Steve Austin (character), the title character from Cyborg and The Six Million Dollar Man
- Steve Austin (runner) (born 1951), Australian long distance runner
- Steve Austin (dog trainer), Australian dog trainer
- Steve Austin (born 1966), member of the rock band Today is the Day

== See also ==
- Stephen Austin (disambiguation)
