= Denise Austin (disambiguation) =

Denise Austin (born 1957) is an American fitness expert.

Denise Austin may also refer to:

- Denise A. Austin (born 1969), Australian Pentecostal historian
- Denise Weston Austin (1925–1997), Northern Irish zookeeper
