= Debra Austin =

Debra Austin may refer to:

- Debra Austin (dancer) (born 1955), American ballet dancer
- Debra D. Austin, professor at Florida State University
- Debra Marshall (born 1960), American actress and retired professional wrestling valet, and former wife of Steve Austin
