= Lloyd Austin (disambiguation) =

Lloyd Austin may refer to:

- Lloyd Austin (born 1953), former American military general and 28th United States Secretary of Defense
- Lloyd James Austin (1915–1994), Australian linguist and literary scholar
- Colin François Lloyd Austin (1941–2010), British scholar
