= Jason Austin =

Australian rugby league footballer

Personal information
- Full name: Jason Austin

Playing information
- Position: Second-row, Prop
Club
Years	Team	Pld	T	G	FG	P
1992	North Sydney	1	0	0	0	0
1996	Western Suburbs	1	0	0	0	0
	Total	2	0	0	0	0
- Source: As of 21 December 2022

Jason Austin is an Australian former professional rugby league footballer who played in the 1990s. He played for Western Suburbs and North Sydney in the NSWRL/ARL competition.

== Playing career ==
Austin made his first grade debut for North Sydney in round 22 of the 1992 NSWRL season against Balmain at North Sydney Oval where the game finished in a 14-14 draw. In 1996, Austin played one further first grade game which was for Western Suburbs in the opening round of the 1996 ARL season against Illawarra. Austin played from the bench in Western Suburbs 17-8 victory at WIN Stadium.
