= Michael Phillip Austin =

Australian environmentalist

Michael Phillip Austin is Divisional Fellow of Sustainable Ecosystems at CSIRO in Canberra. He was elected as a Foreign Member of the Linnean Society of London in 1997, and received the Gold Medal from the Ecological Society of Australia in 1995.
