= David Austin (American football) =

American football coach

Biographical details
- Education: Dartmouth College (1904)

Coaching career (HC unless noted)
- 1903–1904: Middlebury
- 1907–1908: Middlebury

Head coaching record
- Overall: 5–11–1

David S. Austin was an American college football coach. He served as the head football coach at Middlebury College from 1903 to 1904 and 1907 to 1908, compiling a record of 9–15–2. A member of Dartmouth College, class of 1904, Austin spent a month at Middlebury in October 1903 coaching the football team.

== Head coaching record ==
Year	Team	Overall	Conference	Standing	Bowl/playoffs
Middlebury (Independent) (1903–1904)
1903	Middlebury	2–3–1			
1904	Middlebury	1–3			
Middlebury (Independent) (1907–1908)
1907	Middlebury	3–3–1			
1908	Middlebury	2–6			
Middlebury:		9–15–2			
Total:		9–15–2			
