= William Austin (American writer) =

American author and lawyer

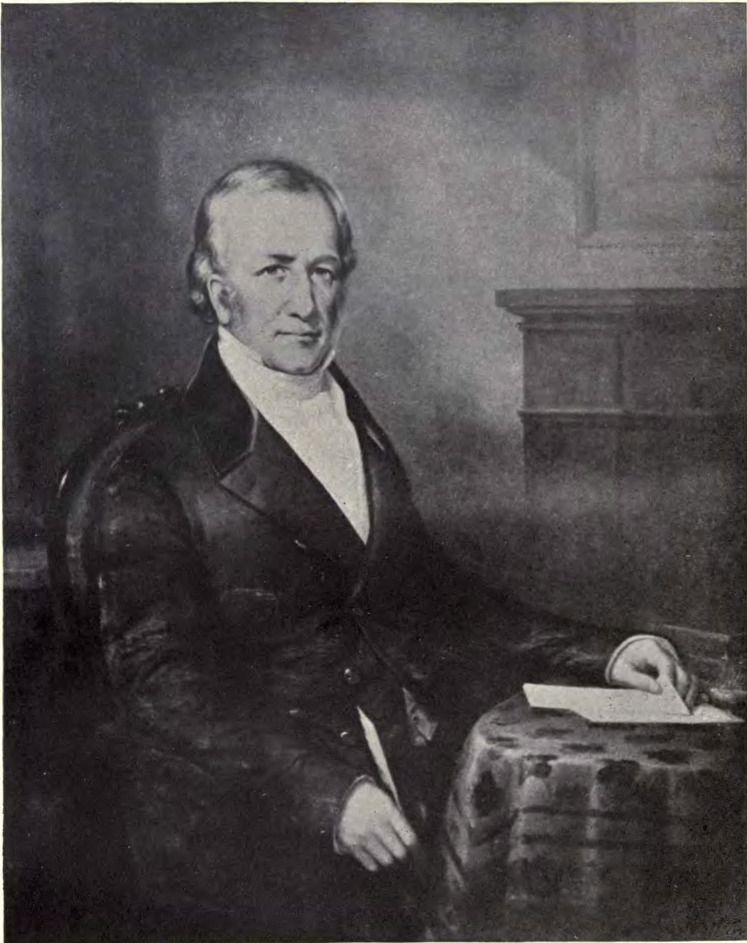
- portrait by Henry Cheever Pratt
- Born: March 2, 1778
- Died: June 27, 1841 (aged 63)
- Occupation: Politician, writer

William Austin (March 2, 1778 – June 27, 1841) was an American author and lawyer, most notable as the creator of the Peter Rugg stories published in the periodical New England Galaxy during 1824–27. Austin's stories, constructed as long letters signed with the name Jonathan Dunwell, presented the Rugg story as a long-standing New England legend, about a strong and obstinate man who got lost in a thunderstorm in 1770 and wandered the roads ever afterwards.

== Biography ==
Austin was born in 1778 in Lunenburg, Massachusetts, where his family had fled after the British burned down their house in Charlestown during the Battle of Bunker Hill. He was educated at Harvard College and Lincoln's Inn, London. He married twice, fought one duel with pistols, and had fourteen children, including Arthur W. Austin and James W. Austin.

As a young man he served as Unitarian chaplain aboard the USS Constitution from about March 1, 1799. He resigned about August 27, 1800. After the Constitution captured a French ship, the salvage proceedings brought Austin $200 and the acquaintance of Alexander Hamilton, who helped the young man begin his legal studies in London. While studying at Lincoln's Inn, Austin produced a lively series of "Letters from London", describing the politics and personalities during the age of Pitt and Fox. Back in America, Austin was active in local politics in the Boston area, serving in the state senate as a representative of Middlesex during the early 1820s.

Although he was a frequent contributor to local periodicals on subjects ranging from Unitarian theology to chemistry to legal history, nothing else he wrote had the popularity of Peter Rugg: The Missing Man (1824) and its sequels. In 1882, his son, James Walker Austin, gathered the three Peter Rugg stories into a single volume. In 1925, Austin's grandson Walter Austin reissued the Rugg tales, this time with a biographical sketch, in the volume William Austin: the Creator of Peter Rugg.

== Influence ==
The stories were so popular and convincing they were accepted as a recounting of actual legend. Austin's original fiction was ignored, and Peter Rugg became used as a character of popular New England ghost tales. The Rugg stories are said to have influenced Nathaniel Hawthorne (who read them contemporaneously as a college student) and Herman Melville, among others.

Professor Thomas Wentworth Higginson of Harvard, writing in 1908, described Austin as "A Precursor to Hawthorne" (essay title), resembling the younger writer not only in "penumbral" sense of dread, but in his preferred era:

The time to which Rugg's career dates back is that borderland of which Hawthorne was so fond, between the colonial and the modern period; and the old localities, dates, costumes, and even coins are all introduced in a way to remind us of [Hawthorne].
