= Arthur W. Austin =

American attorney and government official

- Born: 16 March 1807; Milton
- Died: 26 July 1884 (aged 77); Charlestown
- Occupation: Lawyer, writer
- Parent(s): William Austin

Arthur Williams Austin (March 16, 1807 – July 26, 1884) was an American attorney and government official who served as Collector of Customs for the Port of Boston.

== Early life ==
Austin was born on March 16, 1807, in Charlestown, Massachusetts. He was the eldest child of author and attorney William Austin and his first wife, Charlotte Williams. He graduated from Harvard College in 1825 and studied law under his father and Eli K. Price.

== Legal career ==
Austin was admitted to the bar in 1828. He managed the trusts of a number of large estates, including the estates of Samuel Bradstreet, David Devens, and the heirs of John Hancock. He stopped practicing law full time in 1839.

== Government service ==
From 1829 to 1839, Austin was the postmaster of Charlestown. In 1835, Austin was elected to the Charlestown Board of Selectmen and the 28-year-old was selected by his fellow members to serve as chairman. Austin helped lead the city in the aftermath of The Ursuline Convent riots and in 1836 reorganized the city's fire department. Around 1849, Austin moved to West Roxbury and was a leader in the movement to have the community secede from Roxbury. In 1851, Austin was elected to West Roxbury's first board of selectmen and served until 1859. In 1854 and 1856 he was an unsuccessful candidate for the United States House of Representatives seat in Massachusetts's 3rd congressional district. From 1857 to 1860, Austin served as Collector of Customs for the Port of Boston. In 1874 he was a member of a commission that revised Boston's charter.

== Personal life ==
Around 1874, Austin moved to Milton, Massachusetts. His residence in West Roxbury was purchased by the city of Boston and used as a poor farm and is now part of Franklin Park. Austin was married twice. He married Sarah C. Williams on May 29, 1834. She died on August 23, 1836. Arthur married Ellen M. Willard on May 11, 1848. They had four children

- Florence Austin (born c. 1848)
- Percy Austin (born William Percy Austin and legally changed in 1874) (1850–1877), attorney
- Henry Austin (1858–1912), poet, journalist, and follower of Edward Bellamy's Nationalist movement
- Mary Austin (born 1860)

Austin was a stanch Democrat and a Confederate sympathizer. He defended slavery as a "political necessity". William Gilmore Simms and his children visited Austin at his home.

Austin died on July 26, 1884, at his home in Milton. He directed that the interest on his estate belong to his daughter Mary throughout her life and then the entire sum was to go to the University of Virginia. Although Austin had no ties to the school or the state, he was an admirer of its founder – Thomas Jefferson. The school received around $400,000 from Austin's estate.

Government offices
Preceded by Charles H. Peaslee	Collector of Customs for the Port of Boston; 1857–1860	Succeeded by James Scollay Whitney
