= Sarah Austin =

Sarah Austin may refer to:

- Sarah Austin (entrepreneur) (born c. 1986), entrepreneur and video journalist
- Sarah Austin (translator) (1793–1867), English translator of German texts
