= Boulder Gardens =

Boulder Gardens (also known as Garth's Boulder Gardens) is an eco-retreat located in Yucca Valley, California. Designed and built by permaculturist Garth Bowles, it has become a destination for environmentalists, yoga classes, and outdoor enthusiasts.

In 1981, Bowles purchased some 640 acres of high desert, located near Joshua Tree National Park. Since then, he has slowly added desert-adapted plants, as well as small ponds among the boulders and hills of his retreat. He also was inspired to name the road leading to and through his property, "Gods Way Love".

Boulder Gardens has become a popular spot for campers, and includes a small visitor cabin as well.
