= Mike Austin =

Mike Austin may refer to:

- Mike Austin (golfer) (1910–2005), English-American golfer
- Mike Austin (swimmer) (born 1943), American swimmer
- Mike Austin (rugby union) (born 2000), English rugby union player

== See also ==
- Michael Austin (disambiguation)
