= Greg Austin =

Greg Austin may refer to:

- Greg Austin (rugby) (born 1963), Australian rugby league and union player
- Greg Austin (actor) (born 1992), British actor
- Greg Austin (American football) (born 1983), American football player
