= Caroline Austin =

British molecular biologist

Caroline Ann Austin
- Education: University of London
- Occupation: Molecular biologist
- Known for: Human DNA topoisomerase enzymes

Caroline Ann Austin is a British molecular biologist known for her work on human DNA topoisomerase enzymes. She is a Professor Emerita at Newcastle University.

== Education and career ==
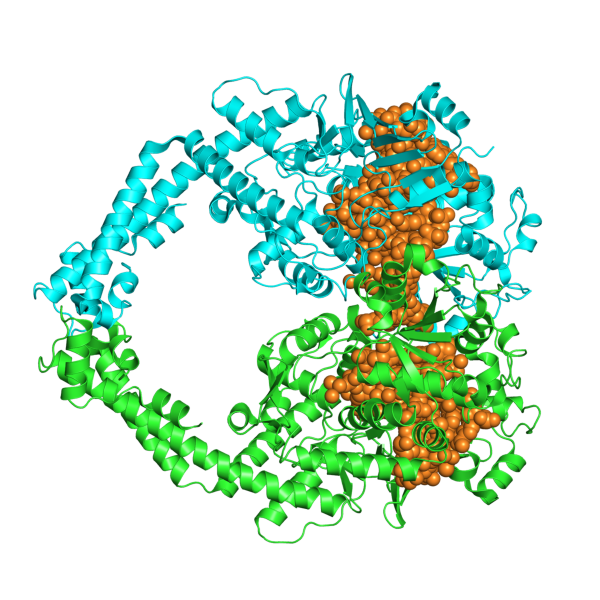
DNA topoisomerase IIbeta

Caroline Austin attended Penzance Grammar School for Girls and then the University of London. She gained her first degree in biochemistry from Chelsea College, University of London. Her PhD is from University College London, studying cytochrome P450s. She carried out postdoctoral research at Harvard University and at St George's, University of London. In 1993, she joined Newcastle University, initially as a lecturer in biochemistry and genetics, and was a professor there from 2005 - 2025. In 2025 she became a Professor Emerita.

She served on the British Society for Cell Biology committee (2011–17) and has been a council member of the Royal Society of Biology since 2017. She was on the Medical Research Council non-clinical career development panel (2013–17). She has co-organised three EMBO workshops (2015, 2017 and 2023). Between 2020 and 2023 she ran an international online seminar series for the topoisomerase research community.

== Research ==
Caroline Austin's published research focuses on human DNA topoisomerase II. She was a co-discoverer of DNA topoisomerase IIbeta (TOP2B). Her most-cited article, Caroline Austin, KL Marsh. "Eukaryotic DNA topoisomerase IIβ" in BioEssays 20 (3), 215–226 (1998) has been cited 351 times (as of June 2025) according to Google Scholar.
