= Louis Austin (disambiguation) =

Louis Austin (1898–1971) was an American journalist, civic leader and social activist.

Louis Austin may also refer to:

- Louis Daly Irving Austin (1877–1967), New Zealand pianist
- Louis Frederic Austin (1852–1905), British journalist
- Louis Winslow Austin (1867–1932), American physicist
- Louis Tomlinson, born Louis Troy Austin, English singer-songwriter

== See also ==
- Louie Austen, Austrian crooner
