= Harriet Bunker Austin =

American author (1843–1904)

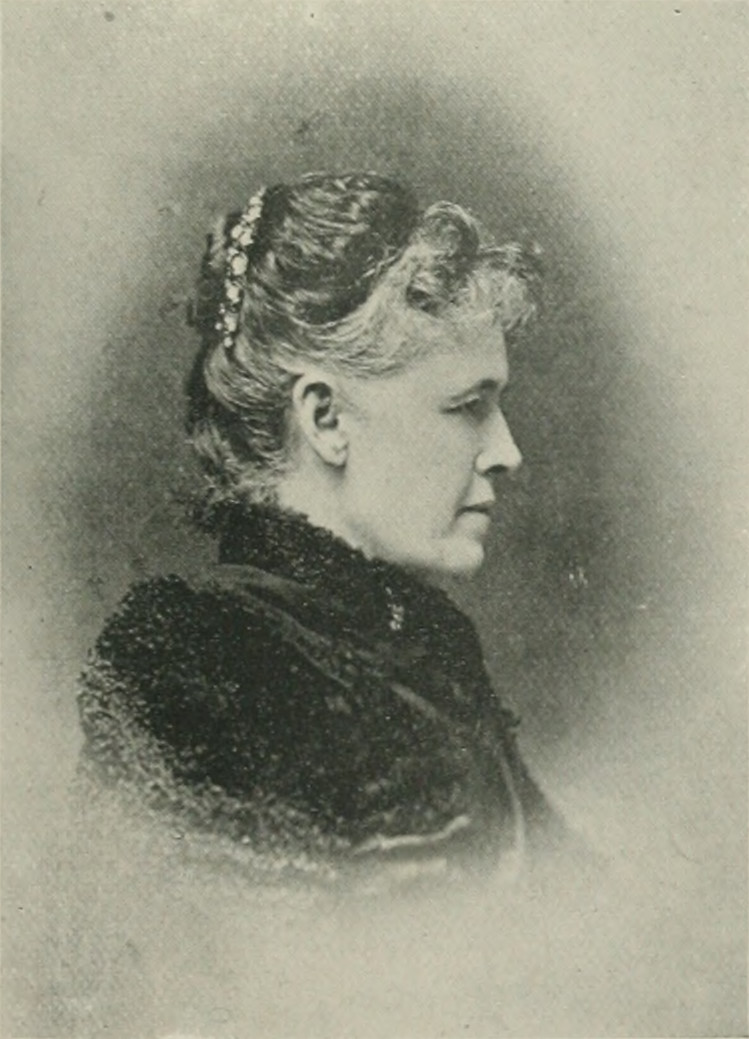
Harriet Bunker Austin

Harriet Melissa Bunker Austin (December 29, 1843 – June 26, 1904) was an American author.

== Early life ==
Harriet Melissa Bunker Austin was born in Erie, Pennsylvania, on December 29, 1843, the daughter of John F. Bunker, descending from New England stock. Her great-grandfather, Benjamin Bunker, was a soldier of the Revolution, and was killed in the battle of Bunker Hill. The hill from which the battle was named comprised part of the Bunker estate, owned by her grandfather, Josiah Bunker. On her mother's side she was related to Amos Bronson Alcott and Lyman Beecher.

When quite young, she moved with her parents to Woodstock, Illinois. Her education was received in the Woodstock high school and Dr. Todd's Female Seminary.

== Career ==
She was a prolific writer, many of her poems became popular after being set to music. Her poems on the National Magazine were reprinted in The Brook Reporter, The Evening Herald, The Rockford Chronicle, Cortland Register, The Madisonian, The Liberty Vindicator, The North Platte Semi-Weekly Tribune, The Allentown Democrat, The Pulaski County Democrat, The Baldwin Times and the Wilcox Progressive Era. She always took an active interest in the advancement of women and the promotion of social reforms.

== Personal life ==
At the close of her seminary life she married William Bainbridge Austin (1832–1899), a prosperous merchant. They were pioneers of McHenry County, Illinois, and they had the following children: Helen Leonore Austin (1859–1880), George Albion Austin (1862–1863), Florence Edith Austin (1864–1910), Harold Austin (1872–1874), Gertrude L. Shackell (1877–1930), Edward W. Austin. Gertrude Austin Shackell ran the Hillcrest Hotel in Woodstock.

She died on June 26, 1904, and is buried at Oakland Cemetery, Wodstock, Illinois.
