= Samuel Austin (poet) =

English religious poet

Samuel Austin, the elder (fl. 1629), was an English religious poet.

== Early life ==
He was the son of Thomas Austin, Esq., of Lostwithiel, Cornwall. He entered Exeter College, Oxford, in 1623, at the age of seventeen, took the degree of B.A. in 1627, and that of M.A. in 1630, "about which time, being numbered with the Levites," he "was beneficed in his own country" (Wood, Athen. Oxon. ed. Bliss, ii. 499).

== Urania ==
At Oxford he spent much time in composing a long poem on scriptural subjects, which was published in 1629 under the title of Austin's Urania, or the Heavenly Muse.

In the dedication to Dr. Prideaux, rector of Exeter College, the author describes the difficulties under which the book was written:

If you knew but the paines i have suffer'd in travell hereof, how many precious houres and dayes I have detain'd from those sports and vanities which are common to others; yea, how much time I have stolne from my other private studies (which lay of necessitie on mee in this place), and sacred them only to this...in briefe, what heavy and hard conflicts, and what a tedious travell I have had (as God knowes) in the producing of it, I dare promise my selfe it would make your yielding heart e'en bleed to thinke on't....But now (thankes bee to my God) I have at length finished it.

The poem is dedicated to "my ever honoured friends, those most refined wits and favourers of most exquisite learning, Mr. M. Drayton, Mr. Will. Browne, and my most ingenious kinsman, Mr. Andrew Pollexfen." This refers to Michael Drayton, author of Poly-Olbion, and William Browne, who wrote Britannia's Pastorals, and implores them to neglect the rural Pan and sing the praises of Divine Providence.

Book 1 of Urania describes the Fall of Man, and Book 2 deals with the Redemption. The work shows the influence of Britannia's Pastorals.
