= Charlotte Elizabeth Austin =

Australian community leader (1878–1933)

- Born: Charlotte Fullerton; 4 June 1878; Dubbo, New South Wales, Australia
- Died: 21 November 1933 (aged 55); St Lawrence Private Hospital, Chatswood, New South Wales
- Resting place: Congregational section of the Field of Mars cemetery
- Other name: Lottie
- Education: Rivière College, Woollahra; University of Sydney (B.A., 1902; M.A., 1905)
- Occupation: Community leader
- Spouse: Alfred Herbert Austin

Charlotte Elizabeth Austin (née Fullerton; 4 June 1878 – 21 November 1933) was an Australian community worker. Born on 4 June 1878 to George Fullerton and Georgina Sarah, née Clarke in Dubbo, New South Wales, her early schooling was at Rivière College in Woollahra. She later attended the University of Sydney and graduated with first-class honours in History and English under the supervision of noted historian George Arnold Wood. Lottie was actively involved in education and community organisations across Sydney and Queensland, contributing to church, youth, and women’s groups. She held leadership roles in the London Missionary Society, the Girl Guides’ Association, and the Young Women’s Christian Association.

== Community work ==
Charlotte taught at schools in both Sydney and Queensland. She participated in parish activities, leading reading circles, Bible study groups, and providing guidance to young people.

She was involved with the London Missionary Society, serving as president of the New South Wales Ladies’ Auxiliary from 1911 to 1917 and later as secretary in 1928.

While living in Queensland, she worked with the Girl Guides’ Association as commissioner for the Western Moreton district. She also participated in the Congregational Women’s Guild and women’s meetings at the annual assemblies of the Congregational Union.

She was a founding member of the national Young Women’s Christian Association (YWCA), formed in 1907, later serving on its board. She presided over the national conventions in 1919 and 1922. In 1913, she published Outline Sketch of the Young Women’s Christian Associations in Australasia.

In 1916, she temporarily left the national board to become general secretary of the Sydney YWCA branch, a position she held until her husband’s return from the war. While in Ipswich, she served as vice-president of the Brisbane branch and chaired the finance committee. After visiting North America to study YWCA operations, she resigned from the national board and returned as general secretary of the Sydney branch in August 1928.

== Published works ==
- Austin, Charlotte Elizabeth; National Young Women's Christian Association of Australasia (1913). Outline sketch of the Young Women's Christian associations of Australasia. National Board of the Young Women's Christian Associations of Australasia – via National Library of Australia.

== Personal life ==
During her time at university, Charlotte became involved with the Australasian Student Christian Union, where she met Alfred Herbert Austin. Charlotte and Alfred married on 21 March 1903 Randwick Presbyterian Church and soon moved to South Australia, where Alfred took up a position as Congregational minister in Gawler. After marriage the couple moved to South Australia where Alfred began as a Congregational minister, and in 1905 moved back to Sydney, where her husband became the pastor of Mosman Congregational Church. Between 1916 and 1917, Alfred served as a senior chaplain on troopships before being appointed to the church in Ipswich, Queensland. In 1924, the couple travelled overseas and, upon returning, settled in Hunters Hill, Sydney, where Alfred continued his ministry until his death on 30 December 1930. The couple did not have any children.
