= Julian Austin =

Julian Austin may refer to:

- Julian Austin (field hockey) (born 1949), retired Canadian field hockey player
- Julian Austin (musician) (born 1963), Canadian musician
