= Harold Austin (Australian cricketer) =

Australian cricketer

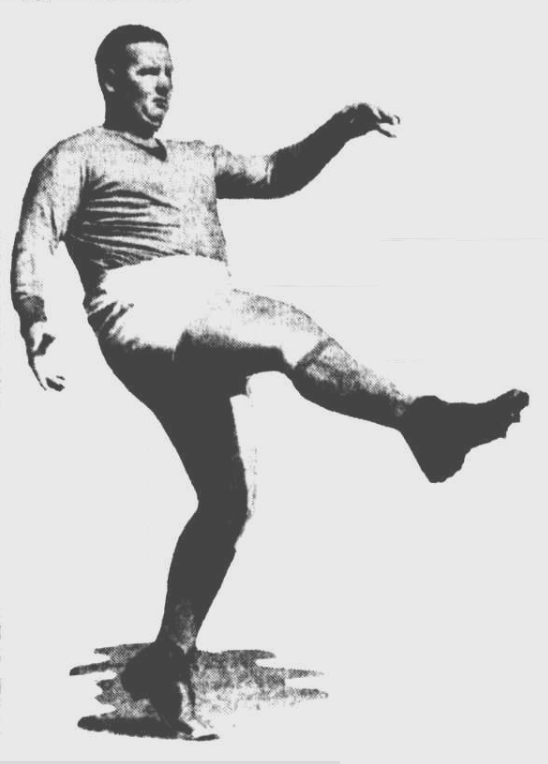

Personal information
- Full name: Harold McPherson Austin
- Born: 8 March 1903; Skipton, Victoria, Australia
- Died: 31 July 1981 (aged 78); Timboon, Victoria, Australia
- Batting: Right-handed
- Bowling: Right-arm leg break

Domestic team information
- Years: Team
- 1924: Cambridge University
- 1924/25: Victoria
- Source: Cricinfo, 21 November 2015

Harold Austin (8 March 1903 – 31 July 1981) was an Australian cricketer. He played six first-class cricket matches for Victoria in 1924–25 and 11 matches for Cambridge University in England in 1924.
