= Mary Austin =

Mary Austin may refer to:

== People ==
- Mary Brown Austin (1768–1824), mother of Texan pioneer Stephen F. Austin
- Mary Hunter Austin (1868–1934), American writer of fiction and non-fiction
- Mary Therese Austin (d. 1889), American theater critic; tennis club founder
- Mary V. Austin (1900–1986), Australian community worker and political activist
- Mary Austin (heiress) (born 1951), closest friend and common-law wife of British singer-songwriter Freddie Mercury
- Mary Austin, wife of Brewster Kahle and co-founder of the Kahle/Austin Foundation
- Mary Austin, pseudonym of American science fiction writer Jane Rice
- Mary-Austin Klein (born 1964), American landscape painter

== Other ==
- Mount Mary Austin, mountain in California's Sierra Nevada range

== See also ==
- Mary Austin Holley (1784–1846), American historical writer
