= Ralph Austin =

Ralph Austin may refer to:

- Ralph Austin Bard (1884–1975), American businessmen and Navy veteran
- Ralph Austen (c. 1612–1676), English writer
