= Bernard Austin =

Bernard Austin may refer to:

- Bernard L. Austin (1902–1979), admiral of the U.S. Navy
- Bernard Austin (politician) (1896–1959), American lawyer and politician from New York
