= Andrew Austin =

Andrew Austin can refer to:

- Andrew Austin (cricketer) (born 1997), Irish cricketer
- Andrew Austin (sport shooter) (born 1956), British sport shooter
