= Matt Austin =

Matt or Matthew Austin may refer to:

- Matt Austin (actor) (born 1978), Canadian actor
- Matt Austin (footballer) (born 1989), Brisbane Lions player
