= Tom Austin =

Tom Austin may refer to:

- Tom Austin (baseball), baseball coach
- Tom Austin (musician), drummer with The Royal Teens
- Tom Austin (politician) (1923–2002), Australian politician

== See also ==
- Tom Austen (born 1987), English actor
