= Charles Austin (journalist) =

American journalist

Charles Austin (November 22, 1944 – April 10, 2018) was an American journalist who worked for WBZ-TV from 1968 to 2000. He was one of the first African-Americans to appear on local news in Boston.

== Early life ==
Austin was born in Worcester, Massachusetts on November 22, 1944. He was the youngest of four children born to Marion Austin. His father Charles Bray Austin of Montgomery, Alabama, came home from WWII with injuries which left him with severe brain trauma; he subsequently died in 1969 in a Veterans Hospital in Bedford, Massachusetts without ever meeting his son.

Austin graduated from Ayer High School in 1962 and attended the New England Conservatory of Music before dropping out to sing full-time. He opened for Bill Cosby at The Bitter End and sang on the same card as Nina Simone. In 1965, while performing in St. Thomas he met his future wife, Linda, a Upstate New York native who was on vacation. The two married in 1967. Austin was drafted into the United States Army during the Vietnam War and was stationed in North Carolina.

== Journalism ==
In 1968, Austin was discharged and returned to Boston. He was hired by WBZ as a film processor. He moved to an on-camera position as a sports anchor, becoming one of the first African-Americans to appear on local news in Boston. He left the sports desk to become a general assignment reporter. Austin covered the Charles Stuart and John Salvi cases, the abduction and murder of Sarah Pryor, the liver transplant of infant Jamie Fiske, and the 1980s famine in Sudan. He retired from WBZ on November 22, 2000.

== Personal life ==
Charles and Linda Austin were one of Boston's most public interracial couples. They had three daughters. Their youngest has Down syndrome and Austin was inducted into the Massachusetts Special Olympics Hall of Fame for his work with that organization.

On June 9, 1994, Austin suffered a mild stroke that slurred his speech and partially paralyzed him and a brain aneurysm that required surgery. He returned to work after therapy. On May 2, 1995, he was diagnosed with prostate cancer. He reported on his health issues on-air to raise awareness of the diseases.

The Austins resided in Lexington, Massachusetts and spent their later years in South Dartmouth, Massachusetts. Austin died on April 10, 2018 from kidney failure.
