= Helen Cloud Austin =

American social worker

Helen Cloud Austin (May 2, 1925-February 23, 2016) was a social worker and advocate for mental health patients and their families.

A resident of San Antonio, Texas since the early 1960s, Austin began her career in social work after earning both Bachelor of Arts and Master of Science degrees from the Raymond A. Kent School of Social Work at the University of Louisville in Kentucky. She was only the second black student to attend the Raymond A. Kent School of Social Work. While there, she was mentored by Martin Luther King Jr.

After graduating, she worked as a social worker at Cook County Psychiatric Hospital in Chicago. She then moved to Cincinnati, where she worked at Longview State Hospital. She began her career there as a caseworker, then became the Director of Inpatient Services and, finally, the Chief of Inpatient Services.

In 1962, her husband's job brought them to San Antonio. While she initially faced discrimination when trying to obtain employment at the San Antonio State Hospital, in 1965 she became their first African-American Chief of Social Services. During her time there, she established numerous programs to help the mentally ill and their families gain understanding and acceptance. She has been the recipient of numerous awards, including the National Association of Social Workers' National Social Worker of the Year Award for 1984.
