= Robert Austin (divine) =

Robert Austin (born 1592 or 1593), was a puritan theologian and divine.

In 1644, Austin published a tract in the quarto format, entitled Allegiance not impeached, viz. by the Parliament's taking up of Arms (though against the King's Personall Commands) for the just Defence of the Kings Person, Crown, and Dignity, the Laws of the Land, Liberties of the Subject, &c. In an address to the reader, the author protests that he had lost much by siding with the Parliament; that he had been actuated solely by motives of patriotism in publishing his views to the world; and that he looked forward to the time when the king would "return in safety, and his throne be established in judgment and in justice". Edward Vallance suggests the book is notable for its "sheer argumentative audacity rather than its actual influence".

In 1647 Austin published The Parliaments Rules and Directions concerning Sacramental Knowledge drawn into Questions and Answers, a duodecimo of eight leaves.
