= Gerald Austin (cricketer) =

New Zealand cricketer

Personal information
- Full name: Gerald George Austin
- Born: 14 March 1875; Dunedin, New Zealand
- Died: 14 October 1959 (aged 84); Dunedin, New Zealand
- Role: All-rounder
- Relatives: Tal Austin (brother)

Domestic team information
- Years: Team
- 1896/97–1912/13: Otago

Career statistics
Competition	First-class
Matches	29
Runs scored	771
Batting average	14.54
100s/50s	0/5
Top score	64
Balls bowled	2,085
Wickets	40
Bowling average	24.00
5 wickets in innings	1
10 wickets in match	0
Best bowling	5/156
Catches/stumpings	22/–
- Source: Cricinfo, 14 January 2021

Gerald George Austin (14 March 1875 – 14 October 1959) was a New Zealand cricketer. He played 29 first-class matches for Otago between 1896 and 1913.

== Cricket career ==
Gerry Austin was born in Dunedin and educated at Otago Boys' High School. He was the youngest of four brothers who played for the Carisbrook Cricket Club in Dunedin in the late 19th century. He played his first first-class match in January 1897.

Austin top-scored in each innings with 35 and 52 in Otago's match against the Melbourne Cricket Club in March 1900. He made a record score for Otago when he scored 182 (in two and a half hours) against Southland in 1903–04. In the 1910-11 senior club cricket season in Dunedin, Austin scored four of the 21 centuries, but he was unavailable to play for Otago owing to work commitments.

He made his highest first-class score of 64 against Canterbury in the Plunket Shield in 1911–12, adding 170 for the second wicket with Cyril Hopkins. Until the 1920s he was one of only three players to score 1000 runs for Otago. He was still playing senior cricket in his fifties, captaining Carisbrook in the Dunedin competition in 1926–27.

The New Zealand cricket historian Tom Reese said Austin was "a very stylish batsman, and decidedly unfortunate in missing selection for New Zealand". He added, however, that Austin's results were disappointing for so capable a player, and suggested that perhaps nerves got the better of him in big cricket.

== Later life ==
In May 1942 Austin was appointed national general manager of Kempthorne, Prosser and Company's New Zealand Drug Company.

He married in April 1921. His wife died in January 1927. He died in October 1959, aged 84.
