= Lynda Applegate =

American economist

- Born: Lynda McDonald Applegate

Academic work
- Institutions: Harvard Business School

Lynda McDonald Applegate is an American economist, currently the Baker Foundation Professor at Harvard Business School.

== Selected publications ==
- Applegate, Lynda M., Robert D. Austin, and Deborah Soule (2009). Instructor's Manual to Accompany Corporate Information Strategy and Management: Text and Cases. 8th ed. McGraw-Hill.
