= Graeme Austin =

Australian rules footballer, born 1952

Personal information
- Born: 1 June 1952 (age 74)
- Original team: Orbost

Playing career^{1}
Years	Club	Games (Goals)
1970–1974	Footscray	50 (17)
- ^{1} Playing statistics correct to the end of 1974.

Graeme Austin (born 1 June 1952) is a former Australian rules footballer in the Victorian Football League (VFL). He played with Footscray, mostly as a midfielder. He was recruited from Orbost, Victoria which was at the time part of Footscray's very productive Gippsland zone. His playing measurements were 178 cm and 68.5 kg.

Austin took five seasons with Footscray to reach 50 senior games, indicating that he was never consistently part of their best 20 players. In fact he spent a few seasons in Footscray's reserves before debuting in 1970. He was not a part of the Footscray's team that reached the elimination final in 1974.

Russell and Main describe Austin as "a handy rover".
