= Charles P. Austin =

American painter

- Born: 1883
- Died: March 17, 1948 (aged 64–65); Santa Monica, California, U.S.
- Occupation: Painter

Charles P. Austin (1883-March 17, 1948) was an American painter who specialized in depictions of Spanish missions in California. He painted murals in St. Peter's Italian Church in Los Angeles and Our Lady of Mount Carmel Church in Montecito, California, and decorations at the Mission San Juan Capistrano in San Juan Capistrano.
