= Frank P. Austin =

Frank Parker Austin (December 30, 1937 – November 20, 2002) was an interior designer and antique dealer who decorated the Playboy Mansion for Hugh Hefner.

A native of Montclair, New Jersey, Austin earned a degree in design from the University of Cincinnati where he was a charter member of the Gamma Beta chapter of Phi Kappa Tau fraternity. He worked briefly in Scottsdale, Arizona, before settling in Los Angeles in 1960. His first design firm, with Bill Lane, was Austin-Lane, with a showroom on La Cienega Boulevard in Los Angeles.

In 1969, he formed F.P. Austin & Co., adding an antique shop to his design business. In 1993, he founded Hampshire House Fabrics & Furniture to market his original designs. His advice to his celebrity clients included the suggestion that they study fashion magazines to help decide what they wanted in color and design.

Austin helped locate the property to build Hugh Hefner's Playboy Mansion and designed the original decor. His clients also included Diana Ross, A&M Records co-founder Jerry Moss, Phil Silvers, Conrad Hilton, Jr., Polly Bergen, Herb Alpert and David Geffen, he also designed the interiors of Cher's Malibu and Benedict Canyon houses that were designed by Edward Grenzbach.
