= Oscar Phelps Austin =

American statistician (1847–1933)

Professor Oscar Phelps Austin
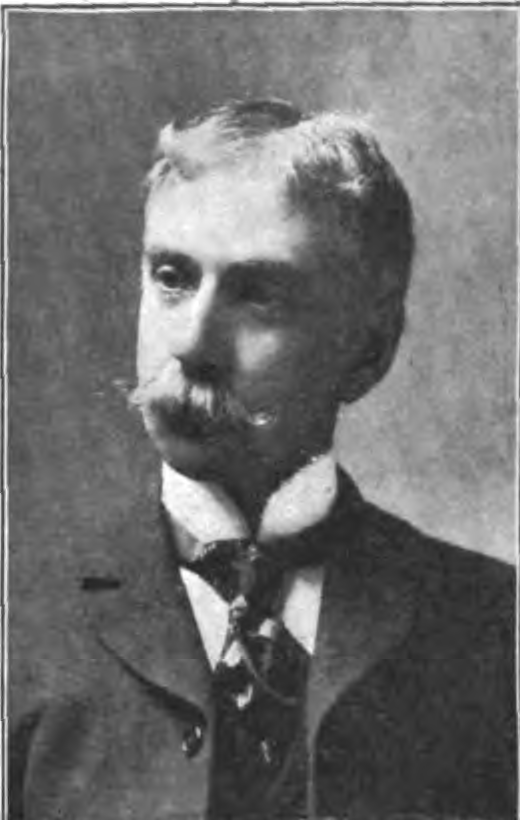
- Born: 27 July 1847; Newark, Kendall, Illinois, United States
- Died: 6 January 1933 (aged 85); Bronx, New York, United States
- Resting place: Fairview Memorial Park and Mausoleum
- Occupation: Statistician
- Spouse: Anna May Richardson
- Children: Florence May Austin
- Parents: Benjamin Austin (father); Emeline Phelps (mother)

Oscar Phelps Austin (27 July 1847 – 6 January 1933) was an American statistician. The earlier years of his life were spent in journalism, and he served as reporter, editor, and correspondent.

== Life and career ==
=== Early life ===
Austin was born in Newark, Illinois, to Benjamin Austin, a farmer and state legislator of Nebraska and Emeline Phelps. Toward the end of the Civil War, Oscar served in the Union Army.

=== Education ===
Austin never received an education above the basic education available to males at the time. On June 11, 1913, George Washington University awarded him a Master of Arts.

=== Career ===
Austin moved to Chicago in 1871 to start his journalism career. By 1873, he moved to Cincinnati and continued his journalism career there until 1881. To further his writing career, he moved to Washington D. C., where he became a correspondent for Metropolitan dailies. He helped edit campaign documents for the Republican National Committee.

While living in Washington, D. C., Austin applied for a patent. Patent number US429079, was for the "Process of Resurfacing Phonograph-Blanks". This patent was approved and later cited by another inventor when patenting a similar technique for records.

Austin was appointed chief of the Bureau of Statistics of the Department of Commerce and Labor on May 9, 1897 by President William McKinley. McKinley had noticed, while Austin was a newspaperman, that his news stories always contain figures. When the Bureau of Statistics was merged into the Bureau of Foreign and Domestic Commerce in 1912, Austin became its assistant chief.

From 1903 to 1914, Austin was a professor of commerce and statistics at George Washington University. He then became statistician of the foreign trade department of the National City Bank in New York City. He wrote about the commerce of nations and continents, comparisons of colonial systems, and national debts.

=== Marriage and children ===
While in Cincinnati, Austin meet and married Anna May Richardson (21 May 1854 - 10 June 1938), daughter of John Richardson and Mercy Maria Ames. Oscar and Anna had one daughter.

- Florence May Austin (10 December 1875 - 8 February 1942). Florence never married.

== Published works ==
- Uncle Sam's Secrets: A Story of National Affairs for the Youth of the Nation, 1897
- ... Uncle Sam's Soldiers: A Story of the War with Spain, 1898
- Colonial Systems of the World, 1899
- Commercial South and Central America, 1899
- Great Canals of the World, 1899
- Commercial Africa, 1900
- Submarine Telegraphs of the World, 1900
- Colonial Administration, 1901
- Commercial Alaska, 1901
- Commercial China, 1903
- Commercial Japan, 1903
- Historical Map of the United States, 1903
- Commercial India, 1904
- Steps in the Expansion of Our Territory, 1904
- Commercial Prize of the Orient, 1905
- Annual Review of the Foreign Commerce of the United States, 1913
- Economics of World Trade, 1916
- Trading with the Far East, 1920
- Course in Foreign Trade, Volumes 1-12
- Studies on the World's Commerce
- Steps on the Expansion of Our Territory
- Trading with Our Neighbors in the Caribbean
- Uncle Sam's Boy at War: An American Boy Sees the European War
- Uncle Sam's Children: A Story of Life in the Philippines

== Elections of Memberships ==
- Academy of Political and Social Science
- American Association for the Advancement of Science
- International Colonial Institute
- International Union of Comparative Jurisprudence and Political Economy
- Washington Economic Society
- Secretary of The National Geographic Society
- Associate Editor of The National Geographic Society

== Sources ==
- Open Library listing for Austin
