= Neil Austin =

Neil Austin may refer to:

- Neil Austin (footballer) (born 1983), English footballer
- Neil Austin (lighting designer), English lighting designer

== See also ==
- Neill Austin (1924–2008), New Zealand politician
