= Reggie Austin =

Reggie Austin may refer to:

- Reggie Austin (American football) (born 1977), former American football player
- Reggie Austin (actor) (born 1979), American actor
