= Peter Austin =

Peter Austin may refer:

- Peter Austin (brewer) (1921–2014), British brewer
- Peter Austin (linguist), Australian linguist
