= Francis Austin =

Francis Austin may refer to:

- Francis Austin (priest) (1829–1905), Anglo-Guyanese clergyman
- Sir Francis Murray Austin (1881–1953), Royal Navy officer
- Francis Austin (cricketer) (1882–1938), Barbadian cricketer
- Francis B. Austin House, a historic house in Boston, Massachusetts

== See also ==
- Francis Austen (1774–1865), Royal Navy officer
- Frank Austin (disambiguation)
