= Henry Austin (poet) =

English poet

Henry Austin (17th century) was an English poet postulated by Alexander Balloch Grosart as author of The Scourge of Venus, or the Wanton Lady. With the Rare Birth of Adonis. The Second Impression, corrected and enlarged, by H. A. (1614). Grosart's identification in the Dictionary of National Biography depended on a remark about "Austin" by Thomas Heywood. The modern Oxford Dictionary of National Biography notes that this identification rested on a confusion of works by Ovid (The Scourge of Venus is taken from Metamorphoses, not the Ars amatoria and the Remedia amoris which Heywood meant). It also states that later editors did not accept Grosart's view of the identity of "H. A.".

== See also ==
- Apocryphal biographies in the Dictionary of National Biography
