= Fred Thaddeus Austin =

United States Army general

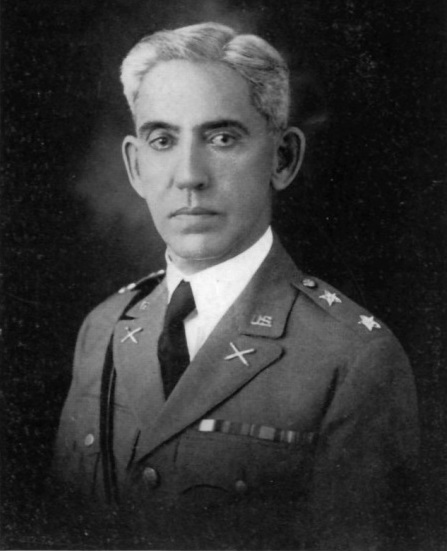
- Frontispiece of the March–April 1928 edition of the Field Artillery Journal
- Born: December 28, 1866; Hancock, Vermont, US
- Died: February 26, 1938 (aged 71); Washington, DC, US
- Burial place: Arlington National Cemetery
- Spouse: Lenore Harrison (m. 1909, d. 1973)
- Military career
- Allegiance: United States
- Branch: United States Army
- Service years: 1898–1930
- Rank: Major General
- Service number: 0-888
- Unit: United States Army Field Artillery Branch
- Commands: 346th Field Artillery Regiment; 350th Field Artillery Regiment; 156th Field Artillery Brigade; 167th Field Artillery Brigade; Field Artillery Replacement Depot, Camp Zachary Taylor, Kentucky; United States Army Field Artillery School; Chief of Field Artillery
- Conflicts: Spanish–American War; World War I
- Awards: U.S. Army Distinguished Service Medal

Fred Thaddeus Austin (December 28, 1866 – February 26, 1938) was an American military officer who attained the rank of major general as the United States Army's Chief of Field Artillery.

== Early life ==
Austin was born in Hancock, Vermont, the son of Julius Tilden Austin and Manora (Keith) Austin. He graduated from high school in Rochester, Vermont, and then attended Norwich University. He graduated with a Bachelor of Science degree in 1888, and a Master of Science in 1894. In 1896, Austin received his qualification as a civil engineer.

== Early career ==
Austin served in the 1st Regiment of the Vermont National Guard from 1888 to 1894; a musician, he advanced from private to sergeant to drum major before moving to Massachusetts.

Austin practiced architecture in Brockton and Boston, Massachusetts, from 1889 to 1898. From 1894 to 1898 he served in the 5th Regiment of the Massachusetts National Guard, first as a drum major, and later as the regimental sergeant major.

== Spanish–American War ==
He volunteered to serve in the United States Army for the Spanish–American War. When the 5th Massachusetts was activated for federal service, Austin was commissioned as a first lieutenant and appointed as regimental adjutant. He joined the regular Army after the war; appointed a first lieutenant in the 46th United States Volunteer Infantry on August 17, 1899, he transferred to the Artillery Corps on August 22, 1901. He served in the Artillery Corps for the rest of his career.

== Continued career ==
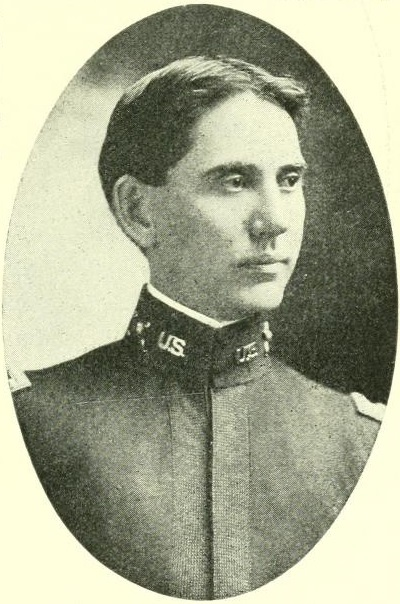
Austin as a captain in 1911

Austin served primarily in the 3rd Field Artillery, and commanded Battery C from 1909 to 1910, and Battery E from 1910 to 1911.

== World War I ==
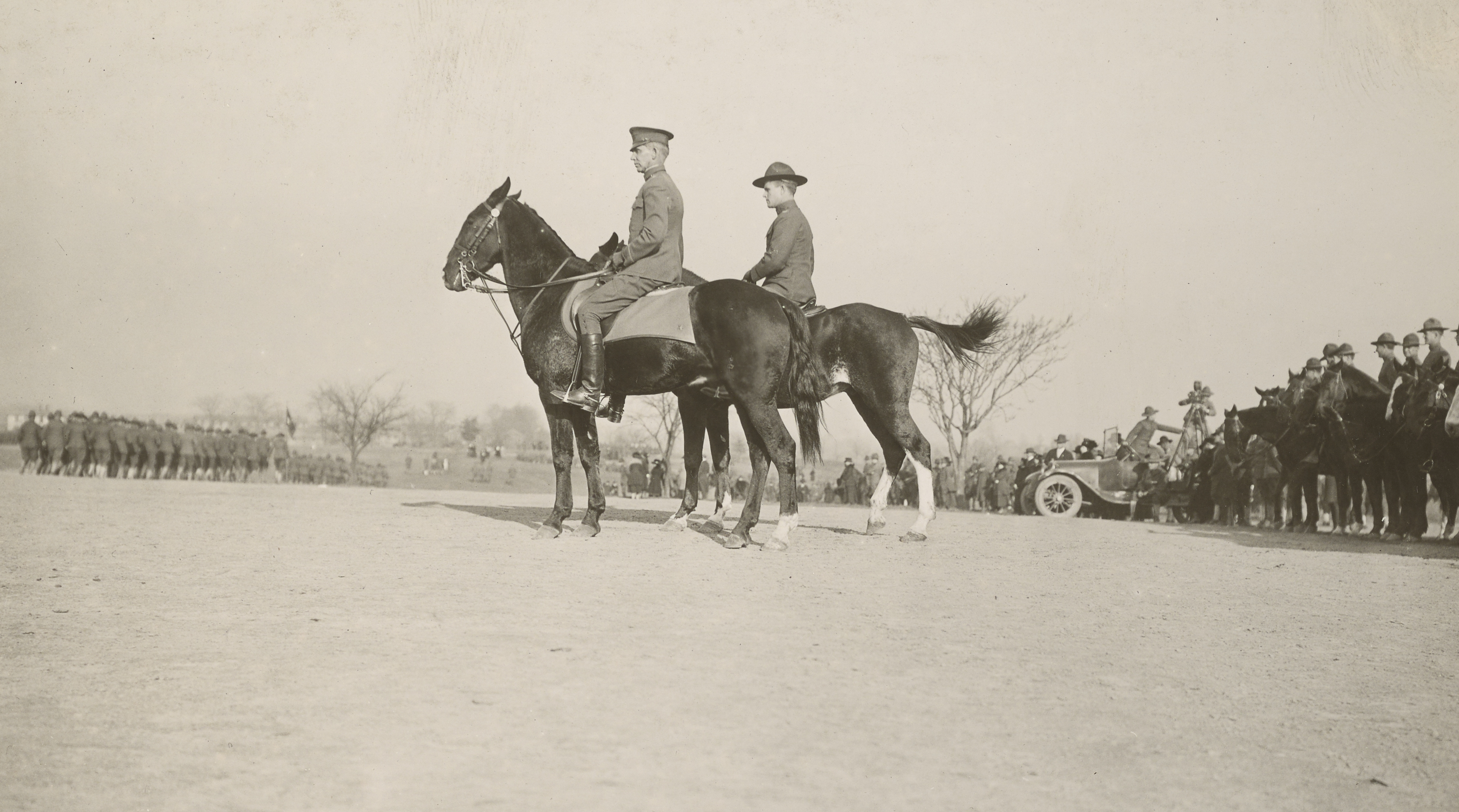
Brigadier General Fred T. Austin reviewing troops at Camp Taylor, Kentucky, December 5, 1918.

During World War I, Austin commanded the 346th Field Artillery Regiment, 350th Field Artillery Regiment, 156th Field Artillery Brigade, 167th Field Artillery Brigade, and the Field Artillery Replacement Depot at Camp Zachary Taylor, Kentucky. On April 18, 1918, he was promoted to temporary brigadier general, and he received the Army Distinguished Service Medal to recognize his superior wartime service. The citation for the medal reads:

The President of the United States of America, authorized by Act of Congress, July 9, 1918, takes pleasure in presenting the Army Distinguished Service Medal to Brigadier General Fred T. Austin, United States Army, for exceptionally meritorious and distinguished services to the Government of the United States, in a duty of great responsibility during World War I, in command of Camp Zachary Taylor, Kentucky, and particularly during the period that said camp was subject to a severe epidemic of influenza.

After World War I, Austin became the director of the Field Artillery School at Fort Sill, in Oklahoma, after which he served in the Inspector General's Department. Austin became a major general in 1927, and succeeded William J. Snow as Chief of Field Artillery. He served as Chief from December 20, 1927, to February 15, 1930.

== Death and burial ==
Austin died in Washington, D.C., on February 26, 1938, and was buried in Arlington National Cemetery.

== Family ==
In 1909, Austin married Lenore Harrison of San Antonio. They were the parents of a son, Gordon Harrison Austin (1913–2010), a career officer in the United States Air Force who was a veteran of World War II and attained the rank of major general.

== Sources ==
- Ellis, William Arba (1911). Norwich University, 1819–1911; Her History, Her Graduates, Her Roll of Honor. Vol. 3. Montpelier, VT: Capital City Press. p. 229.
- Davis, Henry Blaine Jr. Generals in Khaki. Raleigh, NC: Pentland Press, 1998. ISBN 1571970886 OCLC 231779136
- Marquis Who's Who, Inc. Who Was Who in American History, the Military. Chicago: Marquis Who's Who, 1975. ISBN 0837932017 OCLC 657162692
