= Bobby Austin =

Bobby Austin may refer to:

- Bobby Austin (musician) (1933–2002), American country musician.
- Bobby William Austin (born 1944), American sociologist, lecturer, and writer

== See also ==
- Robert Austin (disambiguation)
- Rob Austin (born 1981), English racing driver
