= Geoffrey Austin =

Personal information
- Full name: Geoffrey Lewis Austin
- Born: 11 September 1837; Canterbury, Kent
- Died: 29 May 1902 (aged 64); Chelsea, London

Domestic team information
- Years: Team
- 1861–1868: Kent

Career statistics
| Competition | First-class |
|---|---|
| Matches | 3 |
| Runs scored | 64 |
| Batting average | 10.66 |
| 100s/50s | 0/0 |
| Top score | 23 |
| Catches/stumpings | 1/– |
- Source: CricInfo, 4 January 2012

Geoffrey Lewis Austin (11 September 1837 – 29 May 1902) was a British Army officer, cricket administrator and cricketer.

== Early life ==
Austin was born at Canterbury in Kent, the youngest son of George and Eliza Austin. His father worked as a solicitor and was High Seneschal of Canterbury Cathedral. Austin was educated at The King's School in the city and lived in the Cathedral precincts throughout his life.

== Cricket ==
A keen sportsman, Austin was described as "a capital shot, an expert angler and an enthusiastic and successful golfer". He played in three first-class cricket matches, two for Kent, and one for the Gentlemen of Kent.

Austin is more notable as the second manager of Canterbury Cricket Week, taking over the role from William de Chair Baker. He was a "popular" manager of the week, at the time an important social event, and served on the Kent Committee for a number of years.

== Military service ==
He joined the Rifle Brigade and was commissioned as an ensign in April 1855 before being promoted to lieutenant later the same year. He served throughout the Indian Mutiny of 1857 and saw action at the Siege of Cawnpore, the Siege of Lucknow and at the capture of Calpee with Ross' Camel Corps. He was promoted to captain in 1863 and resigned from the regular army with this rank, joining the Royal East Kent Mounted Rifles, a reserve unit.

== Family ==
Austin did not marry and lived with his sister and two nieces in the Cathedral precinct at Canterbury. He died at Cheyne Gardens in Chelsea in May 1902 aged 64 leaving an estate worth more than £25,000.

== Bibliography ==
- Carlaw, Derek (2020). Kent County Cricketers, A to Z: Part One (1806–1914) (PDF). Cardiff: ACS.
