= Robert D. Austin =

Danish academic (born 1962)

- Born: 1962 (age 63–64)
- Education: Swarthmore College; Northwestern University; Carnegie Mellon University
- Occupation: Technology management researcher

Robert Daniel Austin (born 1962) is an innovation and technology management researcher and professor at Ivey Business School. He is best known for pedagogical innovations in the teaching of technology management, for his "artful making" research, which examines business innovation through the lens of art practice, and for his research documenting the neurodiversity employment movement.

== Biography ==
Austin received bachelor's degrees in English Literature and Engineering from Swarthmore College in 1984, a master’s in Industrial Engineering and Management Science from Northwestern University in 1986, and a Ph.D. in Management and Decision Sciences from Carnegie Mellon University (CMU) in 1995 under the supervision of Patrick Larkey. His doctoral thesis was the recipient of the Herbert A. Simon Doctoral Dissertation Award for Behavioral Research in the Administrative Sciences.

From 1997 to 2009, Austin was a professor of business administration at Harvard Business School, working primarily in the area of Technology and Operations Management. He joined the Copenhagen Business School (CBS) faculty in 2007. He has also spent time as a manager at the Ford Motor Company (1986-1995), a member of the executive team of a startup subsidiary of Novell (1999-2000), the CEO of an executive education foundation (2010-2011), and dean of the faculty of business administration at the University of New Brunswick at Fredericton (2011-2013). He moved to Ivey in 2016.

He is the (co)author of more than 100 published articles, cases, and notes, and ten books.

== Selected publications ==
- Austin, Robert D. Measuring and Managing Performance in Organizations, New York: Dorset House, 1996.
- Austin, Robert D. and Lee Devin. Artful Making: What Managers Need to Know About How Artists Work, Upper Saddle River, NJ: Financial Times Prentice Hall, 2003.
- Austin, Robert D., Nolan, Richard L. and Shannon O'Donnell, Adventures of an IT Leader, Harvard Business Review Press, 2009.
- Austin, Robert D., Devin, Lee, and Erin E. Sullivan, "Accidental Innovation: Supporting Valuable Unpredictability in Creative Process,” Organization Science, September/October 2012 vol. 23 no. 5, 1505-1522.
- Austin, Robert D. and Thorkil Sonne, "The Dandelion Principle: Redesigning Work for the Innovation Economy," MIT Sloan Management Review, Summer 2014.
- Austin, Robert D. and Gary Pisano, "Neurodiversity as a Competitive Advantage," Harvard Business Review, May-June 2017.
- Austin, Robert D. and Helen Lang, "The DAO Hack: A Blockchain Dilemma," Ivey Publishing, 2020.
