= Tal Austin =

New Zealand cricketer

- Born: Thomas Talbert Leon Austin; 9 March 1857 Melbourne, Colony of Victoria
- Died: 11 February 1941 (aged 83) Russell, New Zealand
- School: Otago Boys' High School
- Notable relative: Gerald Austin (brother)
- Occupation(s): Warehouseman, orchardist

Rugby union career
- Position: Forward
Provincial / State sides
Years	Team	Apps	(Points)
1879–1883	Otago	5	
- Cricket career

Cricket information
- Role: All-rounder

Domestic team information
- Years: Team
- 1877/78–1888/89: Otago

Career statistics
Competition	First-class
Matches	9
Runs scored	186
Batting average	12.40
100s/50s	0/0
Top score	36
Balls bowled	862
Wickets	17
Bowling average	17.82
5 wickets in innings	1
10 wickets in match	0
Best bowling	6/63
Catches/stumpings	5/–
- Source: CricketArchive, 29 January 2021

Thomas Talbert Leon Austin (9 March 1857 – 11 February 1941), commonly known as Tal Austin, was a New Zealand cricketer and rugby union player. He played nine first-class cricket matches for the Otago cricket team, including one as captain, between 1878 and 1889, and made five appearances for the Otago rugby union team between 1879 and 1883.

== Biography ==
Born in Melbourne, Victoria, on 9 March 1857, Austin was from a well-known cricketing family in Dunedin. Along with his three brothers—Gerry, Ernest James ("Tern"), and Bob—he was a member of the Carisbrook cricket club in Dunedin for many years from the early 1870s. He moved with his family to Dunedin while a young boy, but was sent to school in Hobart, Tasmania, before completing his education at Otago Boys' High School.

Remembered as a "fine all-round player", Austin made his cricketing debut for Otago playing against the touring England side in 1877. The following year, he was a member of the Otago XXII that played out a draw against the visiting Australian team at the Caledonian Ground. During a career that stretched over 12 seasons from 1877/78 to 1888/89, Austin played nine first-class matches for Otago, scoring a total of 186 runs, at an average of 12.40 and with a high score of 36. As a bowler, he took 17 wickets, with an average of 17.82 and best bowling figures of 6 for 63. In the field, he took five catches. Austin captained the Otago side in one first-class match, against Canterbury at Carisbrook in the 1885/86 season, and played as wicket-keeper in the first innings of a first-class game against Canterbury in 1883/84, taking three catches.

Austin was a member of the Dunedin Rugby Football Club, and played five matches as a forward for the Otago provincial team from 1879 to 1883.

On 15 November 1893, Austin married Clara Bertha Westwood at St Mark's Church, in the Auckland suburb of Remuera. After working as a warehouseman in Dunedin, Auckland, Wellington and Christchurch for many years, in 1911 Austin took up a 20-acre (8 ha) block at Tasman, between Māpua and Motueka, and planted 15 acres (6 ha) of apple and pear trees in the first year. He was the inaugural president of the Hills Fruitgrowers' Union, and a founding member and secretary of the Bluffs Fruitgrowers' Company Limited.

Austin died at his daughter's home in Russell on 11 February 1941, and he was buried at Russell Cemetery. His wife, Clara, died in 1954.
