= C. G. Austin =

American politician

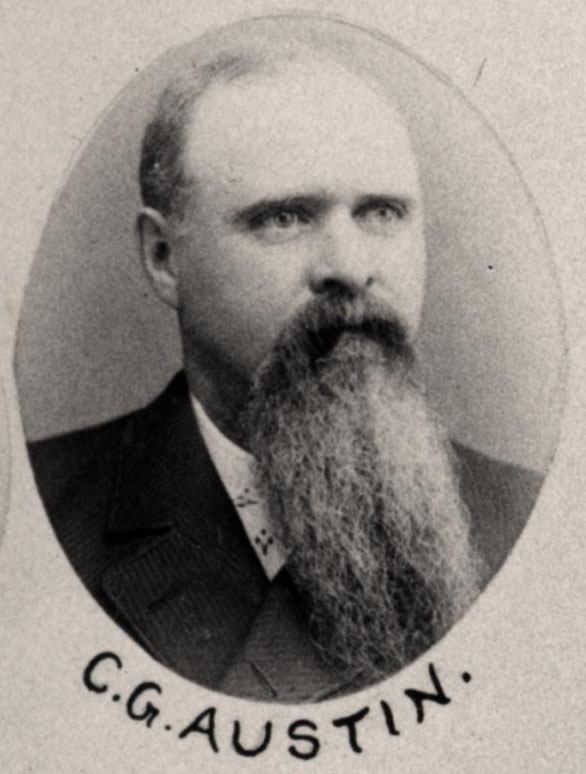
- Austin in 1891

Member of the Washington State Senate
- In office 1889–1891 (6th district); 1891–1893 (8th district)

Personal details
- Born: March 18, 1846 Avon, Ohio, United States
- Died: October 21, 1925 (aged 79) Seattle, Washington, United States
- Party: Republican

Charles G. Austin (March 18, 1846 – October 21, 1925) was an American politician in the state of Washington. He was a Republican and served in the Washington State Senate from 1889 to 1893.
