= Harry Austin =

English cricketer (1892–1968)

Personal information
- Born: 17 April 1892; Moseley, Birmingham, England
- Died: 29 August 1968 (aged 76); Canterbury, Kent, England
- Batting: Left-handed
- Bowling: Slow left arm orthodox

Domestic team information
- Years: Team
- 1919: Warwickshire
- 1928: Worcestershire
- First-class debut: 6 June 1919; Worcestershire v Surrey
- Last First-class: 24 August 1928; Worcestershire v Somerset

Career statistics
Competition	FC
Matches	6
Runs scored	67
Batting average	8.37
100s/50s	0/0
Top score	13
Balls bowled	598
Wickets	3
Bowling average	96.66
5 wickets in innings	0
10 wickets in match	0
Best bowling	1-41
Catches/stumpings	3/–
- Source: cricketarchive.com, 2 April 2008

Harry Austin (17 April 1892 – 29 August 1968) was an English cricketer who played six first-class matches between the wars: four for Warwickshire in 1919, and two for Worcestershire in 1928. He had little success with either bat or ball, though the last of his three wickets (and his only wicket for Worcestershire) was that of Somerset captain and England Test player Jack White.
