= Aaron Austin =

American judge (1745–1829)

Aaron Austin (August 25, 1745 – July 15, 1829) was an associate justice of the Connecticut Supreme Court of Errors (now known as the Connecticut Supreme Court) from 1794 to 1807.

Born in Hartford, Connecticut, Austin "served in the War of the Revolution in the following services: as Captain in the 18th Militia Regiment 1778; Paymaster 1780", and received a pension under an 1818 act of Congress. He was appointed to the state supreme court in 1794, and served until the court was abolished in favor of a new, expanded court in 1807.

Austin died in New Hartford, Connecticut, at the age of 83.

Political offices
Preceded by Asher Miller	Justice of the Connecticut Supreme Court; 1794–1807	Succeeded by Court abolished
