= Staryl C. Austin =

United States Air Force general

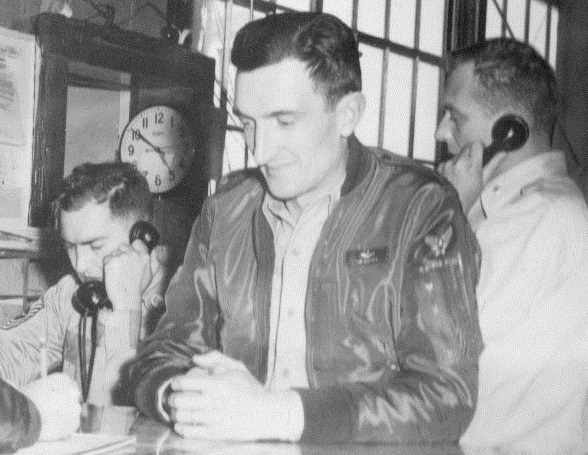
- Lieutenant Colonel Austin at Gowen Field operations center in Idaho, 1954
- Born: September 16, 1920; Condon, Oregon, United States
- Died: January 1, 2015 (aged 94); Salem, Oregon, United States
- Burial place: Willamette National Cemetery
- Spouse: Jacqueline Judd Austin
- Relatives: Steven and Andrew (sons)
- Military career
- Allegiance: United States
- Branch: United States Air Force
- Service years: 1942–81
- Rank: Brigadier general
- Commands: 125th Fighter Squadron and 142nd Fighter Interceptor Group
- Conflicts: World War II
- Awards: Order of the Sword, Air Force Distinguished Service Medal, Legion of Merit, Air Medal with seven oak leaf clusters, and the European-African-Middle Eastern Campaign Medal with four battle stars
- Other work: Director of the Oregon Department of Veterans' Affairs, 1981–84

Staryl Chester Austin, Jr. (September 16, 1920 – January 1, 2015) was a brigadier general in the United States Air Force. He was a P-47 pilot during World War II. He later joined the Oregon Air National Guard. Austin commanded the 142nd Fighter Group and was Assistant Adjutant General of Oregon. After leaving military service, he served as the director of the Oregon Department of Veterans' Affairs. He is a member of the Oregon Aviation Hall of Honor.

== Early life ==
Austin was born in Condon, Oregon, on September 16, 1920. His family lived in a number of Oregon towns while he was growing up. As a result, he attended school in Bend, Albany, and Salem. Austin graduated from Salem High School in 1938. After graduation, he went to work in his father's automobile painting business.

== World War II ==
Austin enlisted in the Army Air Corps in 1942. He qualified as an Aviation Cadet and was assigned to a pilot training unit at Spence Field in Georgia. After completing basic pilot training, he went on to P-47 transition training in Richmond, Virginia. Upon graduation, Austin was assigned as a P-47 instructor pilot at Dover, Delaware. A year later, he joined the 410th Fighter Squadron, part of the 373rd Fighter Group in Belgium.

Austin stayed with the 373rd Fighter Group through the end of the war. The unit's main mission was to help Allied ground force advance by destroying German army ground targets. During his time in European theatre, Austin completed 58 combat missions in Belgium, France, and Germany.

In an interview for Northwest Senior News in 2005, Austin said his missions had not involved aerial combats known as dogfights. "We were normally below 10,000 feet," he said, "... strafing anything that moved, trucks or trains, whatever was trying to get supplies to German troops." Counting himself lucky, he recalled a near miss involving 88mm flak from the Germans "that went up close to the nose of my plane... " After the war ended in Europe, Austin returned to the United States with the 373rd Fighter Group to refit and prepare to join the war in the Pacific. Austin was on leave from his unit when Japan surrendered, ending the war in the Pacific.

During the course of World War II, Austin was awarded the Air Medal with seven oak leaf clusters, the European-African-Middle East Campaign Medal with four battle stars, and the Belgian Fourragere.

== Postwar service ==
After the war, Austin attended college in Tulsa, Oklahoma. At college he majored in aeronautical engineering. He also joined the Oklahoma Air National Guard. He was a major when his unit was activated in October 1950. Austin was the commander of the 125th Fighter Squadron, when the unit flew Republic F-84 aircraft across the Atlantic Ocean to Europe in 1952.

In 1953, Austin returned to Oregon and joined the Oregon Air National Guard. He served as an air officer in the 142nd Fighter Interceptor Group, flying F-86 aircraft out of Portland, Oregon. Austin eventually became the unit's commander. In 1955, Austin flew his F-86 in an air race between Ontario, California, and Detroit, Michigan, competing for the Air National Guard's Earl T. Ricks Memorial Trophy.

In 1963, Austin was appointed as Oregon's Assistant Adjutant General and promoted to brigadier general. In 1971, after seeking the legal opinion of Lee Johnson, the Oregon attorney general, Austin denied use of the Pendleton, Oregon, armory for a convention of the Oregon Elks Association on grounds of racial discrimination. Since the Elks would not accept black people as members, renting the federally assisted armory to the association would violate the Civil Rights Act of 1964 and probably state law as well, Johnson told Austin.

On October 30, 1981, Austin was presented with the Order of the Sword. The award recognizes military leaders who made a significant contribution to the Air Force enlisted corps during their career. He retired from the Air National Guard in December 1981. After his retirement, Austin and Colonel John H. Barden, an executive officer in the same unit, were honored by a military review and flyover at Portland Air Base. Each had served in the military for 37 years. During his Air Force service, Austin was awarded the Air Force Distinguished Service Medal, Legion of Merit, and eight Air Medals as well as with various campaign medals.

== Later life ==
Later in 1981, Oregon Governor Vic Atiyeh appointed Austin director of the Oregon Department of Veterans' Affairs (ODVA), in which capacity he served through 1984. One of Austin's tasks at ODVA was to oversee a $5 billion home and farm loan program that had run into financial difficulty. Some of his budget-balancing efforts, such as raising interest rates on variable-rate loans, met with resistance and in some cases lawsuits. Supporters, including the governor and state treasurer, gave him credit for taking unpopular steps to improve the program's fiscal condition. An Associated Press article in 1984 described Austin's tenure at ODVA as "four turbulent years in one of the state government's most visible hotseats."

After retiring from ODVA, Austin worked as a volunteer serving on the Governor's Veterans' Advisory Committee and the board of directors for the Veterans Care Centers of Oregon. He lobbied the state legislature on behalf of Oregon veterans, and he assisted the Boy Scouts at the administrative level. In 2003, Austin was among the dignitaries who presided at the opening of the new Major General Donald N. Anderson Readiness Center in Salem. In 2005, Oregon Governor Ted Kulongoski presented Austin with a special Governor's Commendation Award, recognizing over 60 years of public service.

At the time of his 2005 interview with Northwest Senior News, he was national vice president of the P-47 Thunderbolt Pilots' Association. In 2007, he was inducted into the Oregon Aviation Hall of Honor. The induction ceremony was held at the Evergreen Aviation and Space Museum in McMinnville, Oregon. He died in Salem on January 1, 2015, at the age of 94.

== See also ==
- 142nd Fighter Wing
