= Ned Austin =

American actor (1925–2007)

- Born: April 29, 1925
- Died: February 10, 2007 (aged 81)
- Occupation(s): Film, stage, television actor

Ned Payne Austin (April 29, 1925 – February 10, 2007) was an American character actor; he was also a member of the Screen Actors Guild and AFTRA.

Austin was in several films, including Annie Hall and The Happy Ending, and some regional movies and industrial films. He played the bridgemaster in Stephen King's directorial debut, Maximum Overdrive, where he introduced the phrase, "Can't you see we've got a situation here?!". After two seasons of summer stock in Surry, Maine, Austin starred as Daniel Boone for the first three years (1952–1954) of Horn in the West in Boone, North Carolina and then moved to Denver, Colorado, where he appeared in about forty stage productions, in various theatre companies.

His television credits include several children's shows and parts in Movin' On, Alias Smith and Jones, Route 66, and a CBS movie of the week, Company of Killers, as well as numerous commercials.

Austin's son, Sam Austin, starred in the Disney film Mountain Born in 1970, shot in Telluride, Colorado. Sam wrote the title song and became one of the youngest members of ASCAP at the age of 12.

In 1972, Austin returned to Boone, North Carolina to live, and he continued to act in community theatre productions and in regionally produced films. He lived there for the remaining 35 years of his life, and died peacefully, in the house in which he was born.
