= Benjamin H. Austin =

American judge (1832–1885)

Second Associate Justice of the Supreme Court of the Kingdom of Hawaii
- In office November 7, 1881 – July 5, 1885
- Preceded by: Albert Francis Judd
- Succeeded by: Edward Preston

Personal details
- Born: Benjamin Hale Austin; January 10, 1832 Saratoga Springs, New York, U.S.
- Died: July 5, 1885 (aged 53) Nuʻuanu Valley, Honolulu, Hawaiian Kingdom
- Relatives: Jonathan Austin (brother)

Benjamin Hale Austin (January 10, 1832 – July 5, 1885) was an American lawyer who served as a justice of the Supreme Court of the Kingdom of Hawaii from November 7, 1881, until his death on July 5, 1885. A lawyer in Buffalo, New York, he moved to Hawaii for his health and sat on the court despite a chronic illness that left him in constant pain.

== Early life and career ==
Austin was born in Saratoga Springs, New York, in 1832, and moved to Buffalo when he was five years old. As a child he developed acute rheumatism which eventually became chronic. He attended law school in Poughkeepsie, practiced law in Buffalo alongside his father at the firm Austin & Austin, and served for a time in the New York State Legislature.

== Hawaii ==
Austin traveled to Honolulu in 1876 in an attempt to improve his health. He found the climate amenable and, after a brief return to Buffalo, he moved to the islands permanently in 1879. In 1881 he was appointed Second Associate Justice of the Supreme Court of Hawaii. He was described by journalists as a studious and impartial judge and continued to sit on cases until a few days before his death.

== Death ==
Austin died in Nuʻuanu Valley on July 5, 1885. The Kingdom of Hawaii declared a day of mourning, closing government offices and flying flags at half-mast in his honor. His funeral was attended by King Kalākaua, Princesses Liliʻuokalani and Likelike, and Governor John Owen Dominis among other dignitaries. Edward Preston was appointed to succeed him on the Supreme Court.

== Personal life ==
Austin was married and had two children, Marion (who attended Vassar College) and George. He had two brothers (one of whom was the lawyer Jonathan Austin) and a sister.

Political offices
| Preceded by Albert Francis Judd | Justice of the Supreme Court of the Kingdom of Hawaii; 1881–1885 | Succeeded by Edward Preston |
