= Raymond D. Austin =

Navajo scholar and judge

Raymond Darrel Austin is Diné (Navajo) scholar and former Associate Justice for the Supreme Court of the Navajo Nation, where he presided over the case of Navajo Nation v. Russell Means. Since 2016, he is a professor in the Department of Applied Indigenous Studies at Northern Arizona University. Austin has practiced law in both the U.S. and tribal courts systems, and has published extensively on Federal Indian Law and Policy.

== Education ==
Austin received his B.S. degree in psychology from Arizona State University in 1979. He attended the University of New Mexico School of Law, where he earned his J.D. in 1983. He received a Ph.D. in American Indian Studies (Law and Policy Concentration) from the University of Arizona in 2007.

== Career ==
In 1982, he was clerk for the Chief Justice at the New Mexico Supreme Court. After completing law school in 1983, he became an attorney at the Navajo-Hopi Legal Services (Navajo Nation). In 1985, Austin became an associate justice at the Navajo Nation Supreme Court where he served for sixteen years. Meanwhile, he was also a lecturer at the National American Indian Justice Center from 1986 to 1990 and a judge pro tempore at the Arizona Court of Appeals (Division I) from 1993 to 1994. In addition, he was also a visiting professor of law in Stanford Law School, University of Utah College of Law, and Arizona state University College of Law.

In 2001, Austin left the Navajo Nation Supreme Court and became a teaching and research assistant in the University of Arizona College of Law for six years. During this time period, he was also a visiting professor of law in Harvard Law School and the University of Extremadura Law School. In 2005, he became a solicitor at the Pascua Yaqui Tribe Court of Appeals as well as an adjunct professor of law at the University of Arizona College of Law, both for two years. From 2006 to 2016, he became a SJD dissertation committee at the University of Arizona College of Law. In addition, from 2007 to 2016, he was also a dissertation committee at the University of Arizona and served as a professor of practice (law) at the University of Arizona College of Law. Meanwhile, Austin was a faculty member of the Tribal Executive Education Seminars and January in Tucson Program which is an Indigenous Peoples Law and Policy Program and Native Nations Institute at the University of Arizona College of Law. In 2009, he also became an affiliate faculty member at the American Indian Studies Department in the University of Arizona. In 2010, he was a visiting lecturer of law at the University of Turin and in 2015, he became a visiting lecturer of law (Dean's lecture series) at the University of Ottawa Law School. From 2016 to present, Austin is a professor at Northern Arizona University in the Department of Applied Indigenous Studies.

== Selected works ==
=== Books ===
Austin's book, Navajo Courts and Navajo Common Law A Tradition of Tribal Self-Governance, was published in November 2009. The book covers Navajo Nation court system and includes detailed case studies of the application of Navajo customary law. In 2010, a book review of Austin's book was published by the University of Oklahoma College of Law and included in the American Indian Law Review.
