= Felipe Enrique Neri, Baron de Bastrop =

Dutch businessman, fraudster, and land developer in Texas

Felipe Enrique Neri Baron de Bastrop
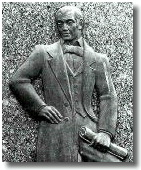
- Monument of Baron de Bastrop in Bastrop County, Texas.
- Born: Philip Hendrik Nering Bögel; November 23, 1759; Paramaribo, Surinam
- Died: February 27, 1827 (aged 67); Saltillo, Mexico
- Resting place: Saltillo
- Known for: Louisiana land development Texas colonization partnership with Stephen F. Austin
- Spouse: Georgine Wolfelina Françoise Lycklama à Nijeholt
- Children: Five
- Parent(s): Conraed Laurens Nering Bögel, Maria Jacoba Kraayvanger

Felipe Enrique Neri (born Philip Hendrik Nering Bögel; November 23, 1759 in Paramaribo, Surinam – 23 February 1827) was a Dutch businessman and land owner known for his assistance in the Anglo-American settlement of Texas.

== Early life and family ==
Philip Hendrik Nering Bögel was the son of the lawyer Coenraed Laurens Nering Bögel from Terborg and Maria Jacoba Kraayvanger from Surinam who married in 1754. In 1764, the family moved to the Netherlands. He married Lady Georgine Wolfelina Françoise Lycklama à Nijeholt in Oldeboorn, on April 28, 1782. They settled in Leeuwarden, where Neri was appointed as a tax collector. The couple had five children.

== Flight to North America ==
In 1793 Nering was accused of using tax funds for personal gain. The province put a reward of 1,000 ducats on his head. Via Hamburg - using the pseudonym Bastrop - Philip arrived in Philadelphia with wife and children before the end of the year. On June 21, 1796, he contracted with Francisco Luis Héctor de Carondelet to settle wheat farming families on his grant. In Spanish Louisiana Neri introduced himself as a Dutch nobleman, Baron de Bastrop who had fled the country because of the French invasion. People believed his false identity, and Bastrop was soon engaged in many land deals where he made a fortune but later went broke. According to the American Guide to Louisiana, the Baron de Bastrop grant "was later to associate the names Aaron Burr, Edward Livingston, and Stephen Girard with the region."

1860 survey of Louisiana showing "rejected claim of the Baron de Bastrop"

He received permission from Spain to form a colony in the Ouachita River valley. His contract with Spanish colonial governor Francisco Luis Héctor de Carondelet provided for European settlement of 850,000 acres on the Ouachita. Although ninety-nine colonists settled in the area, the project was halted when Louisiana realized its government treasury did not have enough funds to see the colonization to fruition. Around 1800 they lived in Frederick County, Maryland; before 1804 his wife and daughters returned to the Netherlands. Around 1806 he lived in San Antonio, Texas.

== Career in Texas ==
When Louisiana's sale from France to the United States was finalized, he moved to Texas and received a permit to establish a colony between Bexar and the Trinity River. He moved to San Antonio in 1806, where he posed as a loyal subject who strongly opposed the sale of Louisiana to the USA. In 1810 he was appointed second alcalde, (mayor or chief judicial official), of the Spanish town.

In 1820, Neri met with Moses Austin, whose request to bring Anglo-American settlers into Texas had recently been rejected. He had been acquainted with Moses Austin, having formerly shared the hospitality of a roadhouse in then-Spanish Missouri with Moses 20 years before he came to Texas. Neri used his influence to help Moses Austin, and later Stephen F. Austin obtain grants to bring Anglo-American settlers into Texas, later to be called the Old Three Hundred.

In 1820, Neri was chosen to be commissioner of colonization for Stephen F. Austin's colony. In 1823, he was elected to the provincial deputation of San Antonio, and later the Legislature of Coahuila y Tejas in 1824. Until his death on February 23, 1827, he served the legislature. At the end of his life he lived in Saltillo. He did not leave enough money for his burial, so other legislative members paid for it. In his will, he left land to his wife and children in the Netherlands. Years later, his true identity was revealed.

== Legacy ==
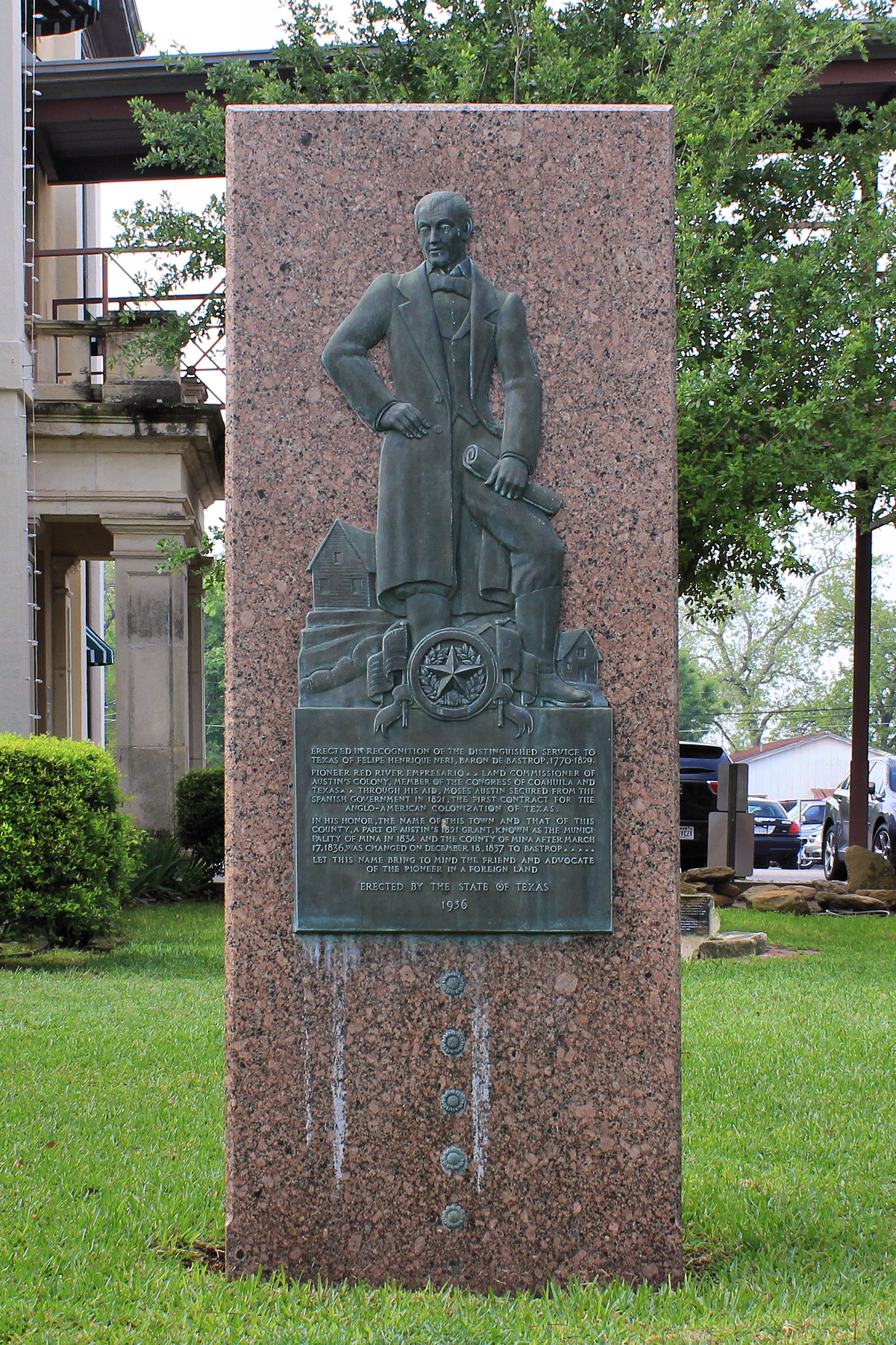
Monument to Neri erected for the 1936 Texas Centennial in Bastrop.

Neri was a very important and influential person in the colonization of Texas. Without him, Texas might have never been populated with Anglo-American settlers.

The following places are all named after him:

- Bastrop, Louisiana
- Bastrop County, Texas
- Bastrop, Texas
- De Bastrop Township, Ashley County, Arkansas

== Sources ==
- Moore, Richard W. Bastrop, Baron de, Handbook of Texas Online.
- The Baron de Bastrop, The Institute of Texan Cultures
- Rogers, Tex; American History, The Old 300, Electric Scotland
- Bastrop, Lone Star Internet
- Felipe Henique Neri Baron de Bastrop, Flickr.com
