= Bevis (ship) =

The Bevis, also known as the Bevis of Hampton, was a merchant sailing ship that brought "Emigrants" from England to New England in 1638, this at a time when thousands of Puritans left England seeking freedom of religious practice.

== Details ==
The Ship Master was named Robert Batten. One voyage in May of 1638 carried 61 settlers from Southampton, England, leaving before 12 May 1638 in which they were “some Dayes gone to sea”, to "Newengland", all one word. The ship's passenger destinations included: Newbury, Weymouth, Wells, Maine, Newport, Salisbury, and Charlestown.

No verified details of this merchant ship, its age or fate is known other than "Beuis(t) of Hampton of CL. Tons". This translates to “Bevis of Hampton, 150 tons.” The (t) was actually a footnote reference symbol in the form of a Latin cross (✝️). The “burthen” or capacity of cargo of the Bevis was 150 tons.

Many of the three masted merchant ships traveling across the Atlantic Ocean about this same time period were in the 450 to 650 ton range.

The cargo or “goods” were certified (not loaded) on 12 May 1638. Yet the ship had been “some Dayes gone to sea” by 2 May 1638. The shippers of the goods were Richard Dumer & Co. Henry Byles & Co.

The exact date of departure is often not known since departures often coincided with the daylight outgoing or “ebb” tide. This being anywhere from a few hours to more than a day after clearance was given to leave port. Some have cited 16 May 1638 and 12 May 1638 as the departure date, but without proof. Again, they had been “some Dayes gone to sea” by 2 May 1638.

“They landed probably at Boston (the point of all but a handful of Bay Colony arrivals) in June or July 1638 (the average ocean crossing took five to eight weeks.”

She completed the voyage to the Americas because her passengers arrived and took up residence there. Her fate thereafter is unknown.

== Passengers ==
SOUTHAMPTON.--- The list of the names of Passeng. Intended to shipe themsleues,
In the Beuis(t) of Hampton of CL. Tonnes, Robert Batten Mr for Newengland,
And thus by vertue of the Lord Treasurers warrant of the second of May
w'th was after the restrayat and they some Dayes gone to sea
Before the Kinges Mat'es Proelamacon Came boto South'uon.

(Copied from passenger image.)

The 61 documented Bevis passengers enumerated or attested to on 2 May 1638 were mostly Puritans, leaving England for the New World driven by the quest for religious freedom at a time when England was moving toward ardent Catholicism. Scholar David B. Gracy, II, notes that some in the hierarchy of the King of England noticed the Bevis was almost entirely composed of Puritans and agents of the Kingdom sought to prevent the ship from setting sail in May 1638, but alas failed to prevent the sailing.

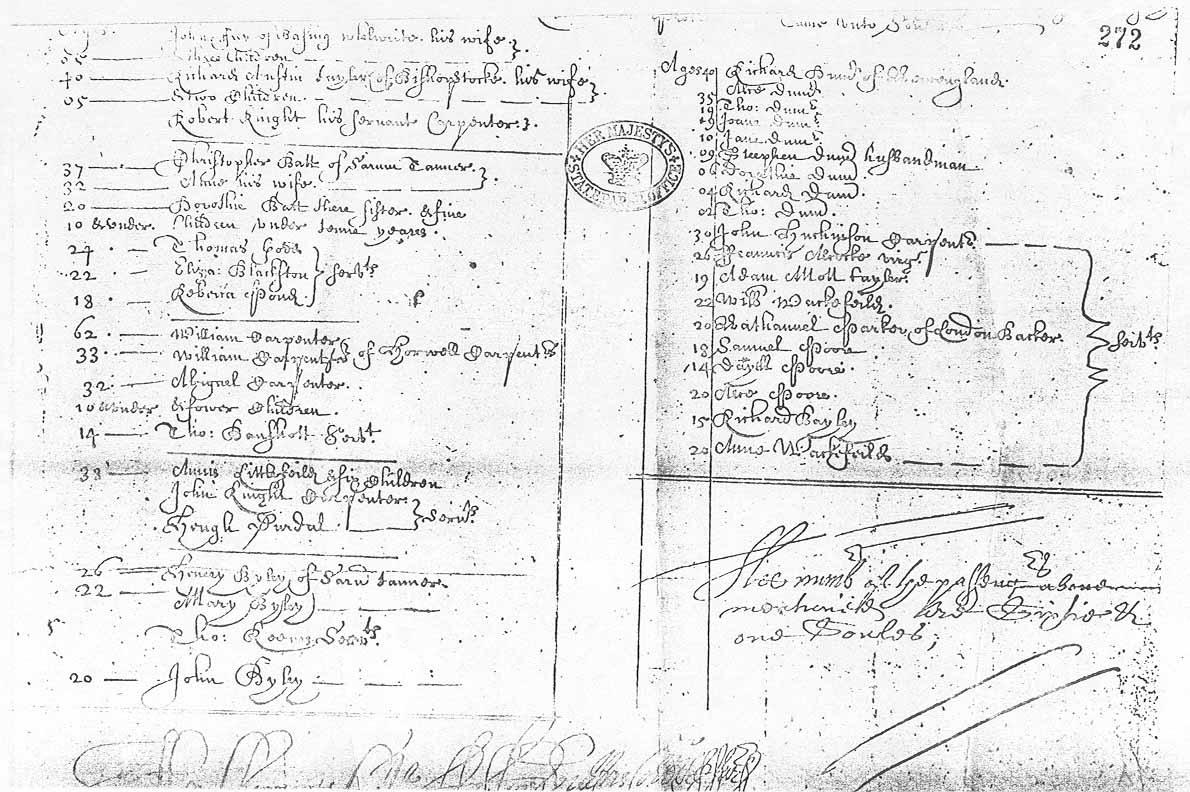
The passenger list portion of the archive papers regarding the Bevis from May 1638.

A listing of passengers from the passenger image include;

Ffrey John of Basing, Whelwrite, wife and 3 children
Austin Richard of Bishopstocke 40, Taylor, his wife and 2 children
Knight Robert 37, Carpenter Servant to R. Austin
Batt Christopher of Sarcum, 37, Tanner
Batt Anna 32, Christopher's wife
Batt Dorothis Batt 20, Christopher's sister
Batt children, 5 under 10 years
Good Thomas 24, Batt Servant
Blackston Eliza 22, Batt Servant
Pond Rebecca,18, Batt Servant
Carpenter William of Horwell /Wherwell 62, carpenter
Carpenter William Jr. of Horwell 33, carpenter
Carpenter Abigael 32
Carpenter children, 4 10 or under
Banshott Tho 14, Carpenter servant
Littlefield Annis 38
Littlefield children, 6
Knight John, carpenter and Littlefield servant
Durdal Hough, Littlefield servant
Byley Henery of Saru 26, tanner
Byley Mary 22
Reemes Tho, Byley servant (aka Thomas Reeves, the Byley servant)
Byley John 20, Byley servant
Dumr Richard of New England 40 (aka Richard Dummer – Dumr is the abbreviation of Dummer, the r is written in superscript in the image.)
Dumr Alice 35
Dumr Tho 19
Dumr Joane 19
Dumr Jane 10
Dumr Steephen, husbandman
Dumr Dorothie 6
Dumr Richard 4
Dumr Tho 2
Hutchinson John 30, carpenter, servant
Alcocke Francis 26, servant
Mott Adam 19, Taylor, servant
Wackefeild Will. 22, servant
Parker Nathaunel 20, servant of London Backer
Poore Samuel 18, servant
Poore Da'yell 14, servant
Poore Alce 20, servant
Bayley Richard 15, servant
Wackefeild Anna 20, Servant

The nomb'r of passeng'rs aboue mentioned are Sixtie and one Soules.
Tho: Wurfres Coll. And Sear' Hen: Champante Cust's. D. Dingley Compt'r
[Endorsement.]----Southotn, 1628. The sert. And list of the Passeng'rs names gone for New England in the Bevis of Hampton, in May 1638.

(Copied from passenger image.)

== Notable passengers and comments on them ==
Richard Austin, whose descendants of the same surname name would include Moses Austin, Stephen F. Austin, and Emily Austin Perry who collectively are credited with settling the State of Texas.

William Carpenter from Shalbourne whose Rehoboth Carpenter family descendants included many politicians, generals, admirals and an astronaut.

Richard Dummer, who had previously emigrated in 1632 as an organizer of and investor in the failed Plough Company (Lygonia Providence). Dummer had returned to Hampshire, England, about 1637 and, as a Bevis passenger, was bringing relatives back to New England with him. The following excerpt is from Eugene Cole Zubrinsky's online sketch of "William2 Carpenter of Rehoboth" which indicates an indirect connection between Dummer and the Carpenters:

"The Bevis passenger list describes William2 and his father as “of Horwell,” that is, Whorwell (now Wherwell), in Horwell Hundred, Hampshire, about 15 miles south-south-east of Shalbourne. Wherwell, which had a tradition of religious dissent—at least two of its vicars, Stephen Bachiler (1587–1605) and his probable brother-in-law John Bate (1605–1633), were nonconformists—lies on a straight line from Shalbourne to the Bevis’s port of departure, at Southampton. (Another Bevis passenger in 1638 was Richard Dummer, who, with kinsman Bachiler, had been a partner in the Plough Company, which had recruited dissenters for migration to New England in 1631 and 1632.) It is clear from the chronology of Carpenter records at Shalbourne that the family was at Wherwell for a few months at most. It is indeed possible that they paused there only long enough to obtain from sympathetic authorities the certificates of conformity (one for each man) that customs officials would require for the Carpenters to leave England and from which the residence recorded for them on the passenger list was probably copied (TAG 70:193–94, 195n14; NEHGR 14:336; Old Hampshire Maps; see also “Focus on the Planter,” GMN 15, no. 4)."

Frances Alcock Hutchins, who was later among those arrested for witchcraft.

== See also ==
See the link: https://www.packrat-pro.com/ships/bevis.htm for the Bevis Passenger list on line.
