= Henry Austin (Texas settler) =

Texas settler (1781–1852)

- Born: January 31, 1782; New Haven, Connecticut, U.S.
- Died: January 23, 1852 (aged 70); Galveston, Texas, U.S.
- Resting place: Episcopal Cemetery, Galveston
- Occupations: Sailor, merchant, steamboat operator, settler
- Known for: Piloting the first steamboat in Texas
- Spouse: Mary Tailer (m. 1814)
- Children: 6
- Parent(s): Elijah Austin; Esther Phelps Austin
- Relatives: Mary Austin Holley (sister); Moses Austin (uncle); Stephen F. Austin (cousin); Emily Austin Perry (cousin); James Elijah Brown Austin (cousin)

Henry Austin (January 31, 1782– January 23, 1852) was a sailor and Texas settler.

== Early life ==
Austin was born in New Haven, Connecticut to Elijah and Esther (Phelps) Austin. He joined the merchant marine at the age of twelve, first as a cabin boy on a ship bound for China. He had five brothers and two sisters. One of his sisters was Mary Austin Holley.

Elijah Austin was a ship owner, a captain, and a shop keeper. He died of yellow fever in New York in 1794. After the family learned that the estate was insolvent, Henry, at the age of fourteen, joined the crew of Captain Daniel Greene and embarked on a round-the-world tour on board the Neptune.

== Career ==
Austin was a merchant in New Haven and New York City between 1805 and 1825, but by his own omission, some of those early business ventures were failures. Austin traveled to Missouri in 1806 and met with his uncle, Moses Austin, for whom he would serve as his eastern agent for the next decade.

In 1824, Austin received an invitation from Stephen F. Austin to settle and establish a business in his Texas colony. While not immediately taking up the offer, Henry did sail to other parts of Mexico in 1825, where he attempted various businesses.

Henry Austin piloted the first steamboat in Texas. Upon the urging of this cousin, Stephen F. Austin, Henry sought business opportunities in Mexican Texas as early as 1824. In addition to settling people along the Texas coast, he established business in other parts of Mexico, including Veracruz. Austin acquired a new steamboat, the Ariel, which he plied on the Rio Grande River starting in 1829. After failing to run profitably there, he moved Ariel to the Brazos River. However, Austin struck a sandbar piloting the mouth of the Brazos, and the ship was never again in a state of good repair. Austin was the first to pilot three major waterways from Gulf Coast Texas and learned about their fluctuations, along with the problems at their mouths.

== Personal life ==
Austin married Mary Tailer in 1814. They had three daughters and three sons.

== Death ==
Austin lived in Galveston from December 1845 until his death in Galveston on 23 January 1852. He is buried at the Episcopal Cemetery in Galveston.

== See also ==
- Moses Austin, his uncle
- Stephen F. Austin, his cousin
- Mary Austin Holley, his sister
- Emily Austin Perry, his cousin
- James Elijah Brown Austin, his cousin
- Old Three Hundred, the first families of Austin's colony

== Bibliography ==
- Hall, Andrew W. (2012). The Galveston–Houston Packet: Steamboats on Buffalo Bayou. Charleston, SC: History Press. ISBN 978-1-60949-591-6.
- Hogan, William Ransom (1937). "The Life of Henry Austin". Southwestern Historical Quarterly. 37 (3): 185–214.
- Lee, Rebecca Smith (1962). Mary Austin Holley: A Biography. Austin: University of Texas Press.
