= Sally Scull =

Early white settler in Texas

Sally Skull
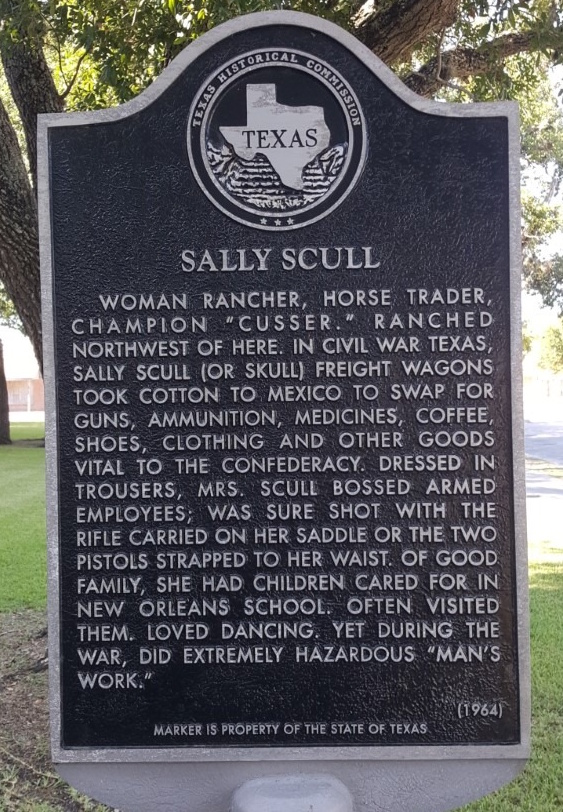
- State Historical Marker at Refugio, Texas.
- Born: Sarah Jane Newman c. 1818; Pennsylvania
- Disappeared: 1866
- Monuments: Refugio, Texas, Texas State Historical Marker.
- Other name: Sally Scull
- Years active: 1833-1866
- Era: Republic of Texas, American Civil War, Antebellum.
- Known for: Texas Legend
- Spouses: Jesse Robinson, 1833-1847; George H. Scull, 1847-1849; John Doyle, 1852-1855; Isaiah Wadkins, 1855-1858; Christoph Horsdorff, 1860-1866
- Children: Nancy Robinson; Alfred Robinson
- Father: Joseph Newman
- Family: Newman-Rabb

Sally Skull (born Sarah Jane Newman, c. 1818 – 1866) was the daughter of Rachel Rabb Newman and Joseph Newman, and arrived in Spanish Texas with the first settlers in Stephen F. Austin's colony in the early 1820s. She gained notoriety for her prowess in husbandry, skill in horse trading, marksmanship with the two pistols she carried, commanding language, and for transporting cotton and essential goods for the Confederacy. Skull owned and operated a successful horse ranch, where she employed ethnically Mexican men as ranch hands and teamsters for her caravan and horse wrangling ventures to South Texas and Northern Mexico, Skull was also reported to speak Spanish as well as a native speaker. Skull's livelihood took her well outside of typically female occupations for the time, which was considered "man's work".

== Early life ==
Sarah Jane Newman was born c. 1818 in Pennsylvania to parents Joseph Newman and Rachel Rabb Newman.

Skull's family moved from Pennsylvania down towards Texas, from the Arkansas Territory to modern-day East Oklahoma, until Skull's family joined Rachel's father, William Rabb, in the Spanish Province of Texas in 1820.

The combined Rabb and Newman families were among the earliest settlers in Moses and Stephen F. Austin's Texas Colony.

Rabb received the largest grant in the Texas colony, which encompassed present-day La Grange, Texas, in Fayette County, which was given in exchange for WIlliam Rabb's commitment to build a gristmill and sawmill on the Colorado River.

Of the combined Rabb and Newman family, five heads of family received land grants in Austin's Colony: William Rabb, his three sons Andrew Rabb, John Rabb and Thomas J. Rabb, and his son-in-law Joseph Newman.

== Marriage to Jesse Robinson ==
Skull's father died in early 1831, which may have prompted Skull into early maturity and marriage.

Skull married Jesse Robinson at the age of sixteen on October 13, 1833, where they resided on Robinson's grant in DeWitt's Colony on the San Marcos River near the town of Gonzales, Texas.

Robinson had migrated to Texas in 1822, and in the spring of 1823 joined a volunteer company, which were the predecessors of the Texas Rangers, which had formed to protect the settlers of Austin's Colony from Native American Tribes such as the Comanches.

In 1824, Robinson and several other company members rescued the Rabb and Newman families from one-hundred-and-eighty Waco and Tawakoni Native American Indians who had surrounded their properties, slaughtered their livestock and set fire to their crops; this interaction was likely Robinson and Skull's introduction, when Robinson was twenty-four and Skull only six or seven years old.

Robinson was one of Sam Houston's elite company members, and as such he served during the Texas Revolutionary War and was present for the Battle of San Jacinto. According to legend, Robinson fired the shot that struck and killed the cannoneer manning the center of Santa Anna's army line.

During the following summer of 1836, Robinson served in Captain Lockhart's spy company of mounted volunteers, later he saw service again in August, 1841 under Captain January, and again in September, 1842, where he participated in the Woll Campaign. under Captain Zumwalt.

Skull and Robinson were married from 1833 to 1847, which ended in divorce. The pair had two children together, Nancy (Robinson) Barber and Alfred Robinson Nancy was born January 10, 1824, and married Ben Barber, they had two children. Alfred was a Texas Ranger who was in active service during the American Civil War, he married Sarah Ann Latham and the pair had six children together.
