= Vince's Bridge =

Wooden bridge in Texas, destroyed 1836

Coordinates: 29.7193351°N 95.220145°W

Vince's Bridge was a wooden bridge constructed by Allen Vince over Vince Bayou near Houston, Texas. Its destruction by the Texan Army Rangering Company played a critical role during the April 1836 Battle of San Jacinto in the decisive defeat of the Mexican Army, which effectively ended the Texas Revolution. Located on the most likely possible route of escape for General Antonio López de Santa Anna and his column of the Mexican army, the burning of Vince's Bridge helped prevent his soldiers from reaching the safety of nearby reinforcements.

There has been considerable confusion over Vince's Bridge ever since the Battle of San Jacinto. Different accounts from that time disagreed about where the bridge was located and who actually destroyed it. This confusion was partly because two brothers, William and Allen Vince, owned lands near each other, which were crossed by two separate streams, Vince's Bayou and Sims Bayou.

William Vince owned property along Buffalo Bayou and named a nearby stream Vince’s Bayou. He built a bridge over this stream to make it easier to move across his land. His brother, Allen, owned land adjacent to William's but never built anything significant there. He chose instead to live in William’s cabin and use William's bridge.

Historical documents and narratives mainly confirm that the bridge destroyed during the battle was indeed on Vince's Bayou, part of William's property. General Sam Houston, the leader of the Texian forces, ordered the destruction of this bridge not to stop reinforcements but to prevent the Mexican army from escaping, effectively trapping them.

The destruction of Vince’s Bridge was crucial strategically. Once the bridge was destroyed, the retreating Mexican troops were forced into a narrow area where they had to either surrender or try to escape by swimming across the swollen bayou, which was nearly impossible. This strategic move played a significant role in Texas winning its independence from Mexico, as it led to the capture of General Santa Anna.

The bridge appears on the reverse of the state Seal of Texas.

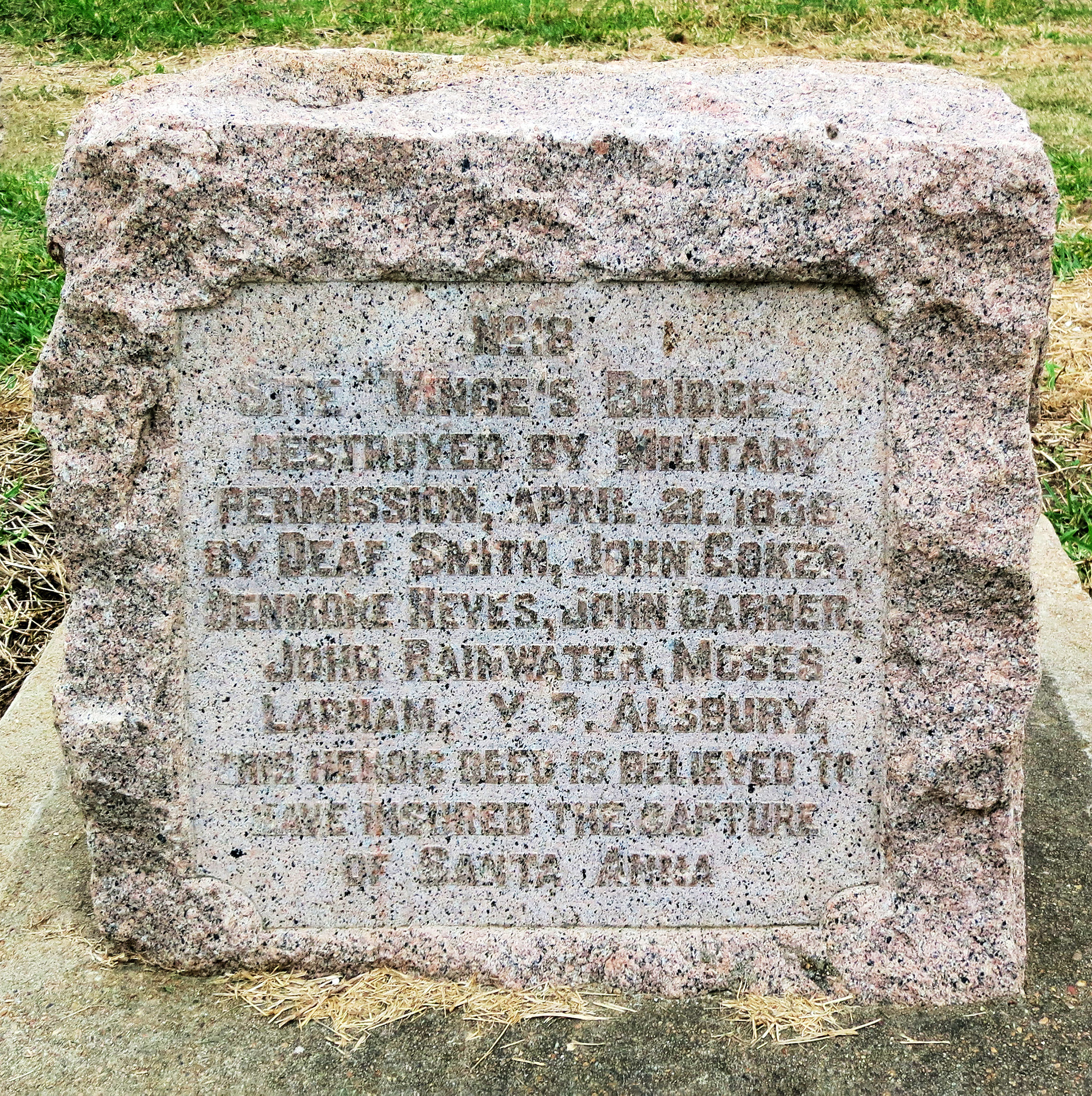
Vince's Bridge marker

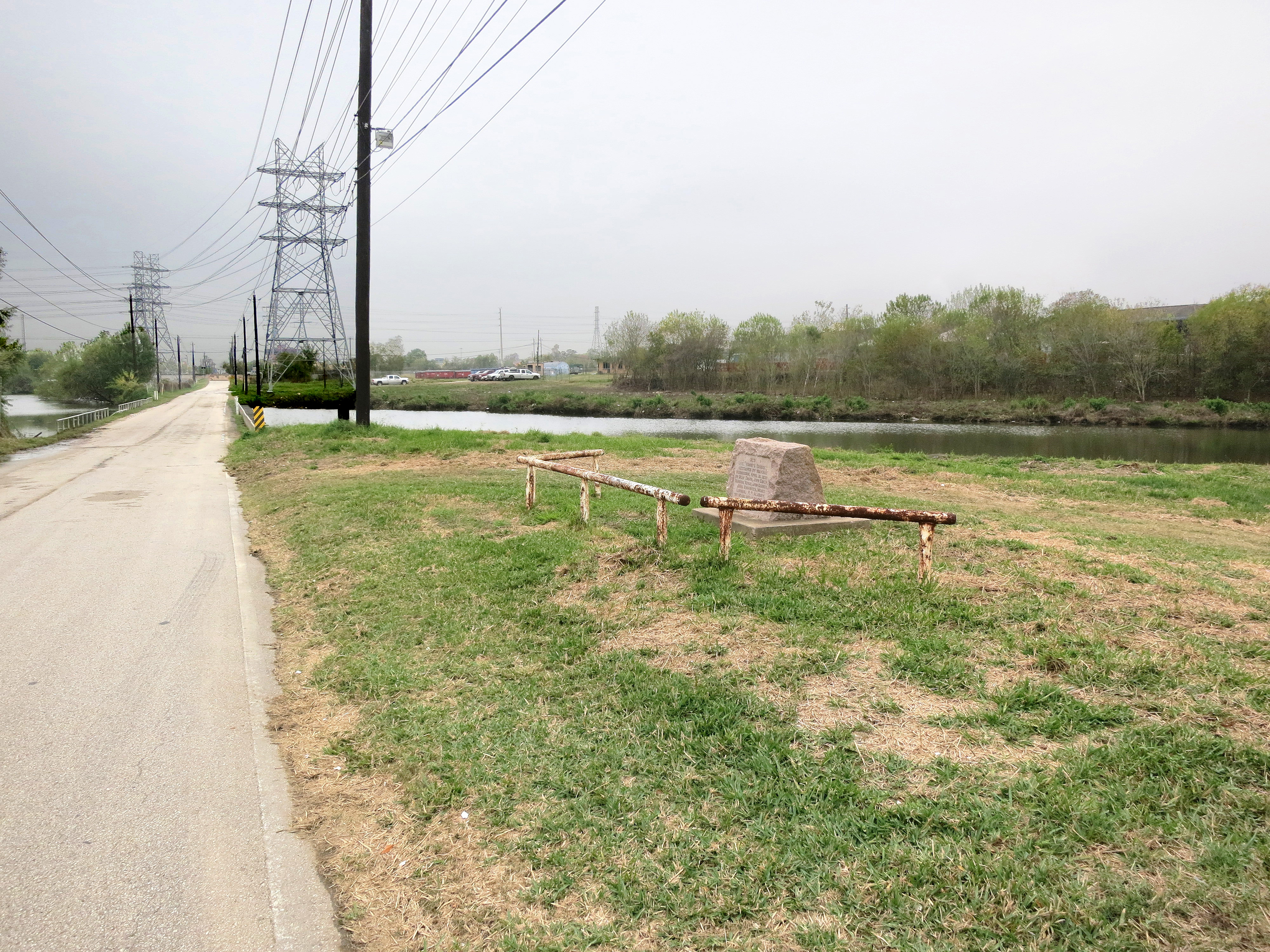
Vince's Bridge Historical Marker with Vince's Bayou in the distance
