= Sylvanus Castleman =

Sylvanus Castleman is one of Stephen F. Austin's Old Three Hundred settlers who received one of the first land grants in the colony of Texas. His land was the first of the 297 grants from Austin, which he received on July 7, 1824.

Castleman arrived in Texas from Missouri in 1821. His land grant was located near La Grange, TX along the Colorado river.

His exact date is not known, though it is believed that he committed suicide. Researchers know that he died prior to March 10, 1832, as his wife Elizabeth Castleman posted notice in the Telegraph and Texas Register on July 8, 1840, that his estate would be presented before probate. In 1841 she was granted 800 acres of his land from his estate.

A clue to Sylvanus's death comes from an article in the July 1956 Lavaca County Tribune where A. Rabb gave information from the "Papers of Mirabeau Bonaparte Lamar, vol. IV, part 1, p 216 that, "Sylvanus Castleman obtained the first head rights in Austin's Colony. It was located on the West side of the Colorado near LaGrange. He later moved to land on the Brazos about 10 to 12 miles above San Felipe on the West side where he became deranged and committed suicide. He was esteemed one of the best of men."

== Family ==
- Castleman's son Jacob served under Sam Houston at the Battle of San Jacinto. He is buried alongside his mother in a family cemetery near Flatonia, TX.
- The Casselman River in Pennsylvania was named for his grandfather Jacob Casselman.
- His daughter LaVania married John Crownover, a descendant of another member of the Old Three Hundred. According to Texas State History, Crowover himself applied for a land grant from Austin.
