= Joseph Newman (Texas settler) =

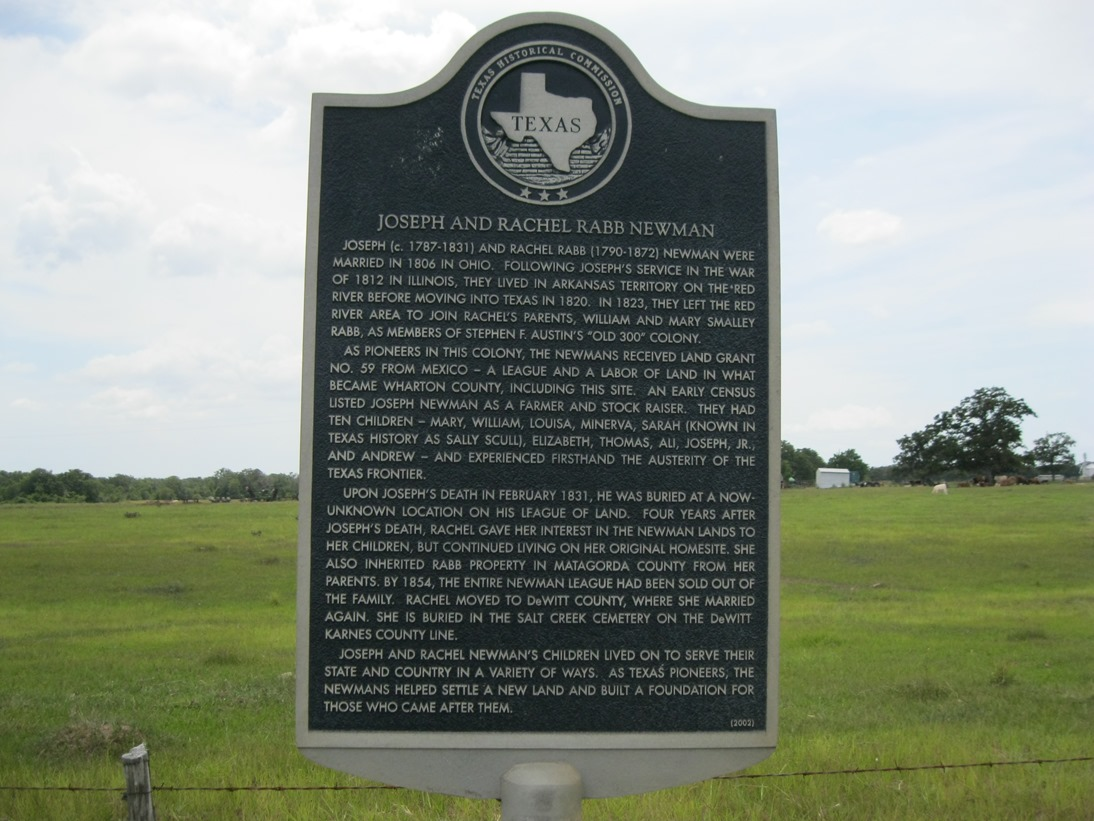
- Texas state historical marker at Newman land grant
- Born: c. 1787
- Died: 1831; Wharton County, Texas
- Spouse: Rachel Rabb Newman
- Children: Mary, William, Eliza, Minerva, Sally, Elizabeth, Thomas, Ali, Joseph Jr. and Andrew
- Relatives: William Rabb (Father-in-law) John Rabb (Brother-in-law) Thomas J. Rabb (Brother-in-law) Andrew Rabb (Brother-in-law)
- Family: Newman-Rabb

Joseph Newman (c. 1787–1831) moved to Texas and became one of Stephen F. Austin's Old Three Hundred colonists. In 1806, he married Rachel Rabb in Ohio. Their family, which eventually expanded to include ten children, moved first to Illinois Territory and by 1820 was living along the Red River in Spanish Texas. In 1824, the Newmans and Rabbs moved to a land grant in modern-day Wharton County, Texas where they farmed and ranched. Joseph died in 1831 but his wife lived until 1872.

== Early life and migration ==
Joseph Newman was born around 1787. On June 21, 1806, then 19-year-old Joseph married 16-year-old Rachel Rabb in Warren County, Ohio. The family later migrated to Illinois Territory where Joseph did military service in the War of 1812. Again the Newmans moved, this time to Arkansas Territory, where they lived along the Red River.

In 1820, the families crossed to the south side of the river and lived in the Jonesborough settlement. The authorities in Miller County, Arkansas tried to collect taxes from the residents of Jonesborough. Believing themselves to be living in Spanish Texas, about 80 settlers petitioned the Spanish governor, asking him to appoint an alcalde to govern them. If this was not possible the petition requested that the settlers be allowed to elect their own officials. The document became known as the Joseph Newman Memorial.

== Austin's colony ==
In 1823, the Newmans traveled to join Rachel's parents William Rabb and Mary Smalley Rabb in Stephen F. Austin's Colony. They were given Land Grant 59 in Mexican Texas on August 10, 1824. The grant included one sitio in what is now Wharton County and one labore in modern-day Austin County. The larger sitio or league encompassed 4,428 acres while the labore was only 177 acres. The Newman's league was located northwest of Wharton, Texas on the east side of the Colorado River. Their labore was located near San Felipe. An adjoining league along the Colorado belonged to Rachel's brother Andrew Rabb.

An early census recorded that Newman farmed and tended livestock. He was not destined to live long on his new land. On February 15, 1831 he signed a will that left his property to his wife and their ten children. Their offspring were Mary, William, Eliza, Minerva, Sally, Elizabeth, Thomas, Ali, Joseph Jr. and Andrew. Of these, the three youngest sons were born in Austin's Colony. The dying Newman appointed Andrew Rabb executor and Rachel executrix of his will. His will also asked that he be buried in the family cemetery on his property. The location of Newman's grave is unknown. Rachel deeded all her property to her children four years after her husband's death, but she kept living in her original home. She also inherited property in Matagorda County from her parents. In 1854, none of the original Newman league belonged to family members, so Rachel moved to Dewitt County where she remarried. She died in 1872 and was buried in the Salt Creek cemetery. Newman's daughter Sally led a very colorful life and was supposed to have gunned down several men.
