= Mary Austin Holley =

American writer

- Born: Mary Phelps Austin; October 30, 1784
- Died: August 2, 1846 (aged 61)
- Resting place: New Orleans
- Occupations: Historian, travel writer
- Spouse: Horace Holley
- Relatives: Stephen F. Austin (cousin); Moses Austin (uncle)

Mary Austin Holley (1784–1846) was an American historical writer best known as the author of the first known English-language history of Texas, Texas (1833), expanded in 1836 into History of Texas. She was a cousin of Stephen F. Austin, who arranged for Holley to receive a land grant on Galveston Bay. Although Holley visited Texas five times (in 1831, 1835, 1838, 1840, and 1843), she was never able to afford to move there.

== Early life ==
Mary Phelps Austin was born on 30 October 1784 in New Haven, Connecticut, to Elijah Austin (1751–1794) and Esther Phelps Austin. She grew up in a large family, which included three older brothers, three younger brothers, and a younger sister. One of her older brothers was Henry Austin (Texas settler).

Elijah Austin was a veteran of the American Revolution, joining the Governor's Foot Guard Company on behalf of the American colonists. He was a merchant and a shipowner. At least one of his vessels delivered to his shop at the New Haven wharf a shipment of Chinese porcelain, silk, spices, and tea. Elijah died of yellow fever in 1794 before Mary's tenth birthday. In addition, one of Elijah's ships had crashed, and the loss was great enough to leave his estate insolvent.

Timothy and Jennett Phelps adopted Mary shortly after Elijah's death. Timothy, Mary's maternal uncle, was a successful businessman, serving as a director for a bank and an insurance company. Jennett was just twenty-one years old when Mary came to live with them. Mary chose to remain in the home of her uncle and aunt even after her mother remarried about two years later. She attended local schools, with her greatest interests being literature, writing, and music.

In 1804, Stephen F. Austin moved from Missouri Territory to live with the Phelpses; Mary's eleven-year-old cousin had grown up in the frontier west before his father sent him to New Haven for an education. Mary was engaged that year to Horace Holley, a seminary student and aspiring minister, and they were married on 1 January 1805.

== Activism ==
Austin moved to join her husband in Lexington, Kentucky, while he served as the president of Transylvania University. She was troubled by the "barren literary climate" and began to work on the university's grounds. After her husband resigned from his position, she wrote the first book published in English on Texas. She continued to promote the annexation of Texas, Mexican-American relations, and the arts.

== Minister's wife ==
For the first few months of their marriage, the Holleys lived in his father's home in Salisbury, Connecticut, while he researched, wrote, and delivered sermons as a guest at a local church. The Holleys returned to New Haven in the summer while they both awaited news about his assignment to a congregation. He accepted the suggestion of the president of the Yale Seminary and took the position as minister of a church at Greenfield Hill in Fairfield County, Connecticut. Horace had taught school in addition to his pastoral duties. He left Fairfield County to go on a preaching tour of New England while Mary returned to New Haven. While on tour, Horace accepted a position as pastor of the South End Church on Hollis Street in Boston. Mary was pregnant and gave birth to their first child, Harriette Williman Holley.
