= Allen Vince =

Allen Vince (c. 1785–1849) was one of Stephen F. Austin's Old Three Hundred.
