= Nannie Webb Curtis =

American temperance activist, lecturer (1861–1920)

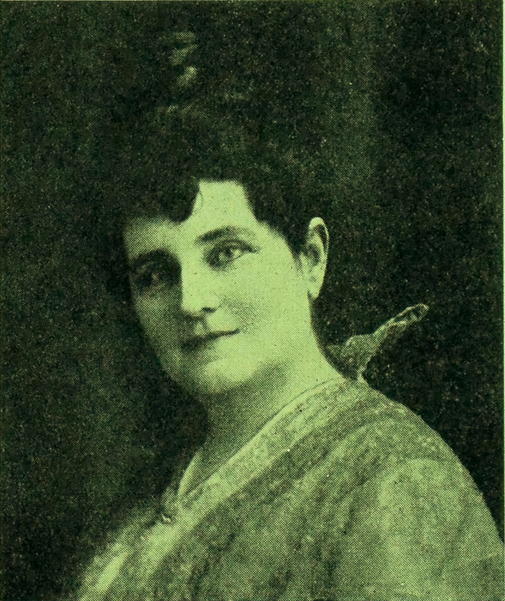
- Born: Nannie Austin; June 22, 1861; Hardin County, Tennessee, U.S.
- Died: March 29, 1920 (aged 58); Dallas, Texas, U.S.
- Resting place: Oakland Cemetery, Dallas
- Education: North Texas Female College
- Occupations: lecturer; activist; clubwoman; writer; editor
- Spouses: W. J. Webb (m. 1881; died 1890); I. S. Curtis (m. 1893; died 1915)
- Children: 4 sons
- Relatives: Stephen F. Austin; Moses Austin
- Writing career
- Language: English
- Genres: essays; articles
- Subject: temperance

Nannie Webb Curtis (née, Austin; after first marriage, Webb; after second marriage, Curtis; June 22, 1861 - March 29, 1920) was an American lecturer and temperance activist, widely-known as a clubwoman. She wrote essays on the topic and edited a magazine. She served as National vice-president of Woman's Christian Temperance Union (WCTU), sat on the National Executive Committee, and was also on the Official Board of the National WCTU, the lawmaking body of organization. Her father having been a Methoidist minister, she made her living lecturing as a pulpit orator on the topics of prohibition and woman suffrage on behalf of the National WCTU, Chautauqua, and the lyceum circuits. Frequently characterized as being "bigger than her state", Curtis was a patriot and a speaker of national fame.

== Early life and education ==
Nannie Austin was born in Hardin County, Tennessee, June 22, 1861. (Note: Cherrington (1924) records Nannie's place of birth as Hardin County, Texas.) Her parents were Rev. D. J. and Julia Ann (Couch) Austin. On her paternal side, her great-grandfather was Benjamin A. Austin, an uncle of Stephen F. Austin. Moses Austin was also a distant relative.

From her childhood, Curtis was bent on temperance reform. The Rev. Atticus Webb, in The Union Signal for April 8, 1920, related that Curtis' father, a prosperous merchant, included a large number of barrels of liquor in his stock, and that one day, during her father's absence, Curtis turned on the faucets of all the casks in the cellar, and allowed the contents to run to waste. When her father remonstrated with and threatened to whip her, she replied that if he did she would burn the liquor up the next time.

She was brought to Texas in her early girlhood by her parents who settled in Bivins, Texas.

Coming info the world during that period when the South was struggling back from the devastation of civil war, Curtis was early inured to the lessons of effort, which developed in her a never-dying determination to contend for the right against the wrong regardless of popularity or public opinion.

She received her early education in the public schools of Mississippi.

== Career ==
From 1879 to 1894, with intervals at home, Curtis taught in various schools.

In 1881, she married W. J. Webb (d. 1890) while residing in Texarkana, Texas later moving to Sherman, Texas. They had four sons, W. Earl Webb, Roy Orson Webb, Clyde Lee Webb, and one dying in infancy. The family moved to California for the husband's health, but he died there in 1890, and they family returned to Texas the following year. She married secondly, in 1893, I. S. Curtis (d. 1915), of Texarkana. When her sons reached the graded schools, she realized that her education was not sufficient to stand side by side with the education of her boys. With a desire for greater knowledge along academic lines, she entered the North Texas Female College (now Kidd-Key College), Sherman, Texas, for a two-year course in oratory, at the same time her boys went away to school.

From this place, in 1900, she was called to the platform as State Organizer of the Texas Woman's Christian Temperance Union. Having completed the course in oratory, she was elected in 1906 to the Board of National lecturers of the WCTU of America. She became national organizer and lecturer, WCTU, in 1907. In 1910, while living in Sherman, she was elected president of the Texas WCTU and continued in office to her death. Curtis also served as National vice-president, WCTU, as well as State superintendent of temperance in the International Sunday-School Association for Texas.

Curtis lead in every major city campaign in the South against the liquor traffic, as well as the State campaigns North, West and South, having toured every Southern State that voted on this question. On these tours she was given the sobriquet, "the Henry Clay of her sex", and also, "the silver-tongued orator of Dixie". She took part in campaigns in Alabama, Florida, Kentucky, Louisiana, and Virginia, as well as in her own State of Texas.

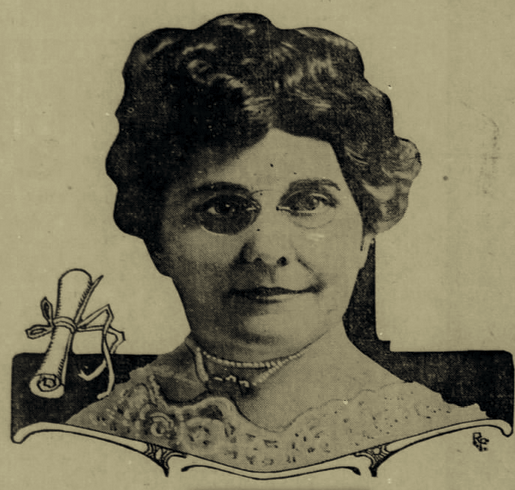
1915

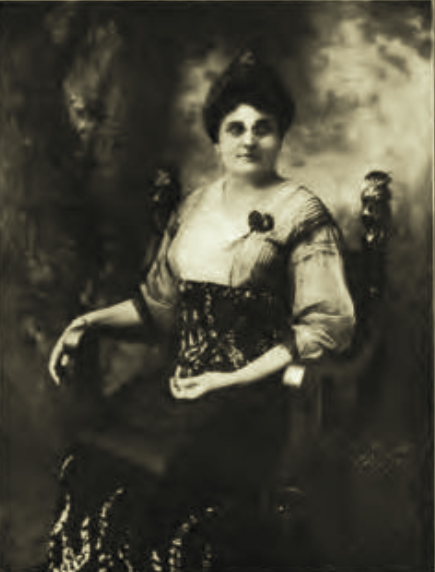
1917

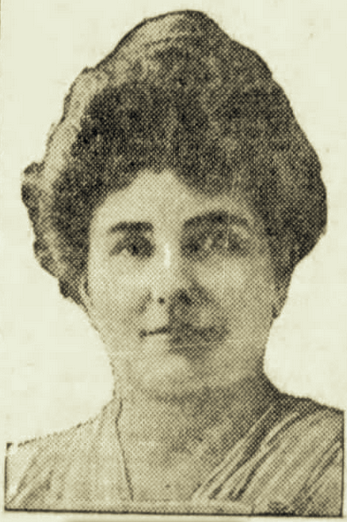
1920

In 1912, she was called to the Chautauqua work, and there she was called "the queen of the Southern platform". For four consecutive years, she spent her summers with the National Lincoln Chautauquas. Her second widowing occurred in 1915. That year, now residing in Waco, Texas, Curtis was unanimously re-elected president of the Texas WCTU, at the 39th annual convention of that organization in Houston. At that convention, she was also appointed as a delegate to the National Anti-Saloon Convention to be held at Atlantic City, New Jersey. She refused many Chautauqua offers for 1917, because she felt that Texas needed her, but her Chautauqua Association succeeded in securing her for 1918. She was a member of the International Lyceum Association, lecturing on "Woman, Her Progress and Future" and "The Country's Greatest Need".

Curtis was made a member of the Sociological Conference, Nashville, Tennessee, 1912, and was appointed each year a delegate to the Southern Sociological Congress. She was asked to take a place on the Child Welfare Commission of Texas. She occupied many places of honor by appointment as recognition of her ability and her work for social, political and moral reforms. She took an active part in promoting the cause of Woman Suffrage woman suffrage.

When Oklahoma was preparing itself for Statehood, Curtis was invited to address its constitutional convention on the subject of Statewide prohibition of the liquor traffic, and as a result of her address before that body, Statewide prohibition was written into the Constitution of that State. When America entered World War I, she served on the National Council of Defense.

As a young woman, Curtis wrote and read temperance essays and pushed local campaigns in the schools of Mississippi. Later in life, she was the editor of the Texas White Ribbon, the official organ of the Texas WCTU, in Austin, Texas, and a collaborator on the Red Back medical journal, in the same city. She was also a contributor of articles to many periodicals in the US.

== Personal life ==
After her second marriage, she converted from the Baptist faith to the Methodist Church.

By 1918, having caught a severe cold, Curtis had fallen ill and was living in a sanitarium in Waco.

Nannie Curtis died at the home of her son, Roy, in Dallas, Texas, March 29, 1920, after a lingering illness of three months. Burial was in Oakland Cemetery, Dallas. On June 15, 1920, the Texas Senate, by a rising vote, adopted a resolution giving its "expression of appreciation and loss by reason of the death of this noble woman".
