= Richard Austin (colonist) =

- Born: 1598; Titchfield, Hampshire, England
- Died: 1645 (aged 46–47); Charlestown, Massachusetts Bay Colony, British America
- Known for: Ancestor of the Austin family
- Children: 2
- Parent(s): Richard Austin Sr., Annis

Richard Austin (1598–1645) was an early Puritan colonist who landed in Boston Harbor, Massachusetts on 16 May 1638 on board a ship called the Bevis. He was the immigrant paternal English ancestor and great-great-great-grandfather of Stephen F. Austin, empresario, considered the "father of Texas" and founder of Texas.

== Early life ==
Richard (Jr.) was born in 1598 to Richard Austin (Sr.) and his wife Annis (of unknown maiden surname) in Bishopstoke, Hampshire, England, and died in 1645 in Charlestown, Suffolk, Massachusetts. Richard (Jr.) was buried in Watertown, Massachusetts.

== Settlement in the colonies ==
Richard Austin is the immigrant ancestor of a family named "Austin" that prospered, ultimately settling parts of Missouri and Texas; noteworthy descendants include Stephen F. Austin, Moses Austin, Emily Austin Perry, Guy Morrison Bryan, Moses Austin Bryan and Stephen Samuel Perry. Richard settled in Charlestown, Massachusetts. There are few references to Richard Austin, but in 1651, Richard Austin or a descendant by the same name held some public offices in Charlestown.

Puritan religious conviction resulted in Richard Austin's decision to leave England for New England. Shortly after arrival, Richard's brother-in-law, Edmund Littlefield (who married Agnes Austin), "broke from his congregation" to then settle in Exeter in New Hampshire.

The ship manifest for the Bevis listed Richard Austin as a tailor from "Bishopstocke" (also known as Bishop Stoke), traveling with his wife and two children.

Most information about Richard is derived from genealogical research. Austin records go back to Kent, England in 1522. The Richard Austin who arrived on the Bevis is the son of another Richard Austin—who is the son of (Stephen or William ?) Austin, born November 17, 1557, in Tenterden, Kent, England, and his wife Margaret Wrigley, born in the same town on May 1, 1550.

== Personal life ==
He married Elizabeth "Betsy" Littlefield in 1630 at Hampshire, England. and they had 2 sons, whose name on the passenger list were not stated. They are believed to be Richard and Anthony, although there is no real documentation to show that the Anthony listed below was their son, that is, outside of having the surname of Austin:

- Richard Austin, III born November 15, 1632, in Bishopstoke, Hampshire, England, and died August 15, 1703, in Charlestown, Suffolk, Massachusetts.
- Anthony Austin was born 1636 in Bishopstoke, Hampshire, England, and died August 22, 1708, in Suffield, Hampshire, Massachusetts.
