= Old Three Hundred =

Group of settlers in the Republic of Texas

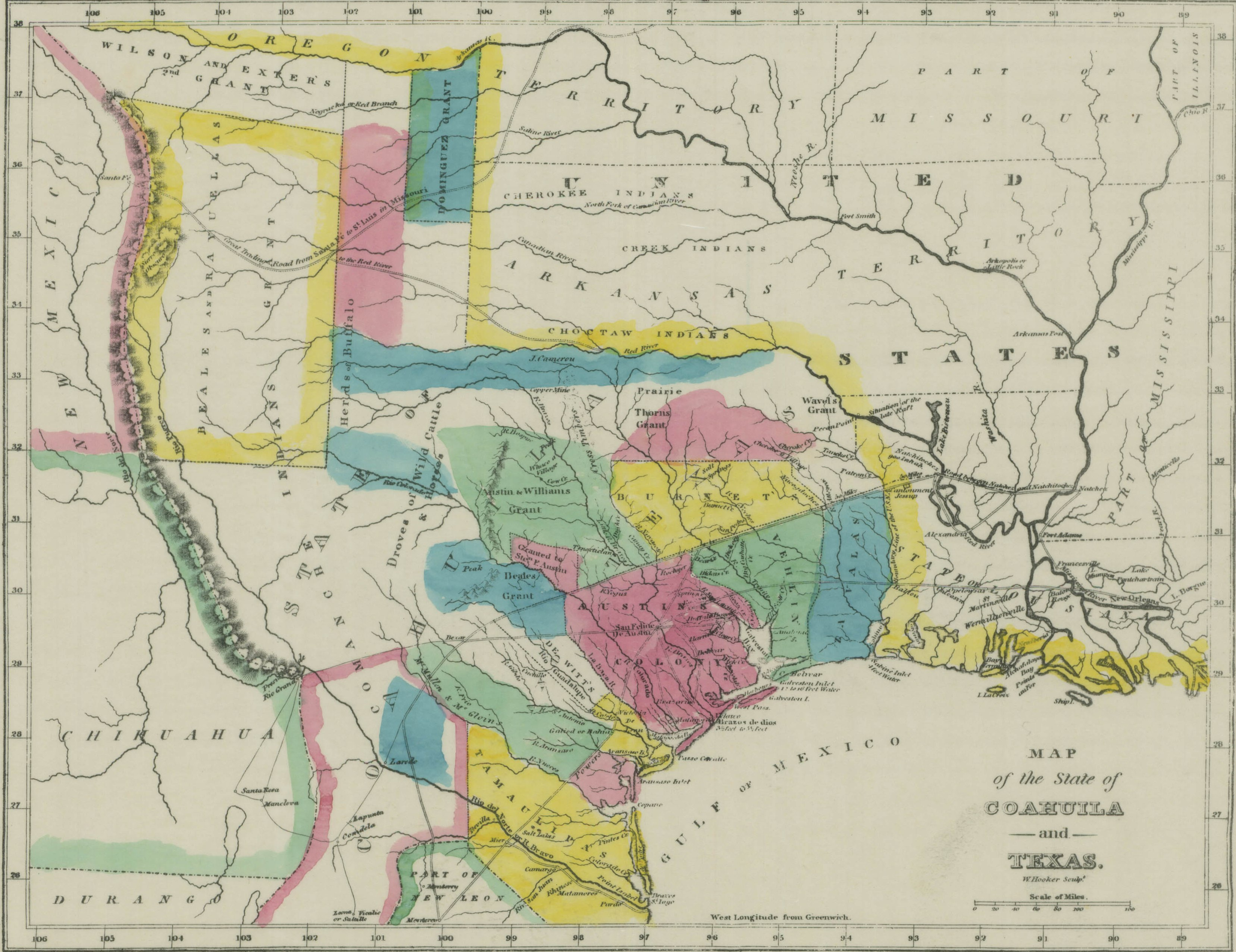
An 1833 map of Coahuila and Texas: Austin's colony is the large pink area in the southeast.

The "Old Three Hundred" were 297 grantees who purchased 307 parcels of land from Stephen Fuller Austin in Mexican Texas. Each grantee was head of a household, or in some cases, a partnership of unmarried men. Austin was an American approved in 1822 by Mexico as an empresario for this effort, after the nation had gained independence from Spain. By 1825, the colony had a population of 1,790.

The colony encompassed an area that ran from the Gulf of Mexico on the south, to near present-day Jones Creek in Brazoria County, Brenham in Washington County, Navasota in Grimes County, and La Grange in Fayette County. It was the first official colony of Anglo-American settlers in Mexico.

== Implementation ==
American Moses Austin was authorized as an empresario by Joaquín de Arredondo of Spain to create a colony of Americans in Texas, which was lightly populated, as a bulwark against the native Comanche people. Before this plan could be implemented, Moses Austin died in Missouri in 1821. That same year, Mexico gained independence from Spain.

Stephen F. Austin carried out his father's plan to settle the untamed region. At the end of the summer of 1821, a small group of Anglo-American settlers and he crossed into Texas. Before he reached San Antonio to meet with the governor, the group learned that Mexico had gained its independence from Spain. Texas was now a Mexican province rather than a Spanish one. Governor Martinez assured Austin that the new Mexican government would honor Spain's contract.

Austin returned to Louisiana to recruit settlers. He offered land at 12 cents per acre, which was 10% of what comparable acreage sold for in the United States. The settlers were required to satisfy conditions imposed by Mexican colonization law and Austin's own regulations:

- They had to be Catholic.
- They had to be of good moral character.
- They had to improve the land (usually by adding structures).
- They had to cultivate the land within two years, or forfeit it.

Settlers would pay no customs duties for seven years and would not be subject to taxation for 10 years. In return, they were expected to become Mexican citizens.

In March 1822, Austin learned that the new Mexican government had not ratified his father's land grant from Spain. He had to travel to Mexico City, 1,200 miles (1,931 km) away, to get permission for his colony. There, he discovered that the Mexican government was dedicated to equal rights for all races and opposed to slavery. (It abolished slavery in 1829.) Austin considered legal slavery critical to the success of his colony, so he spent a year in Mexico City lobbying against antislavery legislation. In 1823, he reached a compromise with the government of Agustín de Iturbide to allow slavery in Texas, with restrictions.

The 1823 Imperial Colonization Law of Mexico allowed an empresario to receive a land grant within the Mexican province of Texas. The empresario and a commissioner appointed by the governor were authorized to distribute land to settlers and issue titles in the name of the Mexican government. Only one contract was ultimately approved under this legislation: the first contract granted to Stephen F. Austin.

== Establishment ==
Between 1823 and 1825, Austin granted 297 titles under this contract. Each head of household received a minimum of 177 acres or 4,428 acres depending on whether they intended to farm or raise livestock. The grant could be increased for large families or those wishing to establish a new industry, but the lands would be forfeited if they were not cultivated within two years.

The settlers who received their titles under Stephen's first contract, known today as the Old Three Hundred, made up the first organized, approved group of Anglo-American immigrants from the United States to Texas. The new land titles were located in an area where no Spanish or Mexican settlements had existed. It covered land between the Brazos and the Colorado Rivers, from the Gulf Coast to the San Antonio Road.

The capital of this new colony was San Felipe de Austin. This is now known as San Felipe in Austin County.

== Growth ==
When Austin began advertising his colony, he received a great deal of interest. He was selective in his choice of colonists, which set it apart from others of the time. Austin chose settlers who he believed would be appropriately industrious. Overall, Austin chose people who belonged to a higher economic class than most immigrants, and all brought some property with them. All but four of the men could read and write. This relatively high level of literacy had a great influence on the future of the colony. According to historian William C. Davis, because the colonists were literate, they "absorbed and spread the knowledge and news always essential to uniting people to a common purpose".

Although Mexican law required immigrants to be Catholic, most of Austin's settlers were Protestant. Many chafed at being ruled by Catholics. Virtually all were of British ancestry. One-quarter of the families brought enslaved African Americans with them. Jared Groce brought 90 slaves, having had large plantations in the Southeast.

== List ==
Lester G. Bugbee in his article "The Old Three Hundred", published in The Quarterly of the Texas State Historical Association (October 1897), identifies the head of each of the Old Three Hundred families who received a land grant in Austin's colony. They were:

Head of household	Born	Died	Family as of March 1826	Notes	Refs	
Elijah Allcorn	1771	1844	Wife, five children and two servants.			
Martin Allen	1780	1837	Wife, nine children			
Abraham Alley	1803	1862	Wife, five children	Brother of John, Rawson, Thomas and William Alley		
John C. Alley		1822		Brother of Abraham, Thomas, Rawson and William Alley.		
Rawson Alley	1793	1833	Single	Brother of Abraham, John, Thomas and William Alley		
Thomas Alley		1826	Single	Brother of Abraham, John, Rawson and William Alley		
William Alley	1800	August 15, 1869	Single	Brother of Abraham, John, Rawson and Thomas Alley		
Charles Alsbury			Single	Brother of Harvey and Horace Alsbury. Died about 1828.		
Harvey Alsbury			Wife	Brother of Charles and Horace Alsbury		
Horace Alsbury	1805	June 1847	Single; later married Juana Navarro			
Thomas Alsbury	1773		Wife and two daughters	Father of Charles, Harvey and Horace Alsbury. Wife Leah Catlett Alsbury. Daughters Leah Ann and Marion B. Served in the War of 1812. Died August 1826.		
Simeon Asa Anderson			Wife, three children, one slave			
John Andrews		February 1838	Wife, two children, one servant			
William Andrews		1840	Wife, five children, two slaves	Daughter married Randal Jones in 1824.		
Samuel Angier	August 26, 1792			In 1829, married fellow colonist Pamelia Pickett		
James E.B. Austin	October 3, 1803	August 14, 1829		Helped put down the Fredonian Rebellion. Brother of Stephen F. Austin.		
John Austin	March 17, 1801	August 11, 1833				
Stephen F. Austin	November 3, 1793	December 27, 1836				
James B. Baily	November 13, 1797	September 30, 1835	5 wives and 18 children			
Daniel E. Balis						
William Baratt						
Thomas Barnet						
Thomas Hudson Barron	1796	1874	2 wives 22 children			
Mills M. Battle						
Benjamin Beason	1786	1837	wife Elizabeth "Betsy" & children Lydia, Collins, Nepsey, Abel, Edward (Leander), Benjamin; one hired hand, seven servants; horses, mules, cattle, and farming utensils	In 1822, Beason (originally Beeson) began operating a ferry across the Colorado River. Beason also established a gristmill, gin, and a sawmill; his wife operated a boarding house. The settlement became known as Beason's Ferry or Beason's Crossing, later the site of the Texas Army camp under General Sam Houston. Following the Battle of the Alamo, Santa Anna's army headed for San Jacinto, and Sam Houston ordered that Beason's Crossing be burned during the Runaway Scrape. Beason's Crossing was officially renamed Columbus after the population returned In 1837. See Columbus, Texas.		
Charles Belknap						
Josiah H. Bell	August 22, 1791					
Thomas B. Bell			Wife Prudencio, three children	Donated the land on which Bellville was founded in 1846		
M. Berry						
Isaac Best	1774	1837	Wife Mary Margaret (Wilkins), and some of their nine children.	After spending his early years in Pennsylvania and Kentucky, Best and his wife left Garrard County, Kentucky, and moved to Montgomery County in southern Missouri in 1808. There he built a mill and an outpost known as Best's Fort, which served as a refuge from Indian attacks during the War of 1812. The family and several slaves moved to Texas in 1824. On August 19 of that year, Best received title to a sitio ["site", in Spanish] east of the Brazos River in what is now Waller County. He increased his landholdings and built a home near the site of present Pattison. The 1826 census described Best as a farmer and stock raiser between forty and fifty years of age. His household consisted of his wife, three sons, two daughters, and four slaves. Best may have lived at San Felipe in 1833, when William B. Travis issued a subpoena for him as a witness in a case against Isaac Clower. Best died near Pattison in 1837. On August 21, 1974, the Texas Historical Commission dedicated a marker to him on Farm Road 1458 1½ miles west of Pattison."		
Jacob Betts						
Francis Biggam						
William Bloodgood						
Thomas Boatwright						
Thomas Borden						
Caleb R. Bostwick						
John T. Bowman						
Edward R. Bradley						
John Bradley						
Thomas Bradley						
Charles Breen						
Patrick Brias						
William B. Bridges	1795	April 4, 1853				
David Bright						
Enoch Brinson						
Bluford Brooks						
Robert Brotherington						
George Brown						
John Brown						
William S. Brown						
Aylett C. Buckner						
Pumphrey Brunet						
Jesse Burnam	1792	1883				
Micajah Byrd						
Morris A. Callihan						
Alexander Calvit	1784	1836				
David Carpenter						
William C. Carson						
Samuel Carter						
Jesse H. Cartwright						
Thomas Cartwright						
Sylvenus Castleman						
Samuel Chance						
Horatio Chriesman						
John C. Clark						
Antony R. Clarke						
Merit M. Coats						
John P. Coles						
James Russell Cook	1812	1843	Single			
John Cooke						
William Cooper						
Robert Cooper			5 children			
John Crownover			1 son	Married to Elizabeth Chesney, son John Chesney Crownover born 1799 in Pennsylvania		
James Cummings						
John Cummings						
Rebecca Cummins						
William Cummings						
James (Jack) Cummins	c. 1773	1849				
James Curtis, Sr.						
James Curtis, Jr.						
Hinton Curtis						
Samuel Davidson						
Thomas Davis						
D. Deckrow						
Charles Demos						
Peter Demos						
William B. Dewees	Sep. 8th, 1799	Apr. 14th, 1878				
John Dickinson						
Nicholas Dillard						
Thomas Marshall Duke	1785	24 May 1867	Married 3 times. 3rd wife, Jane Mason Wilkins McCormick Duke. 6 children; Mary Francis, Charlotte Jane, Thomoas Marshall, Jr., John Marshall, Stephen Austin, Alice Imogin	Died, Hynes Bay, Refugio County, Texas during the yellow fever epidemic of 1867-Certified by Witnesses: Wm. Andrews, G. Seelingson, F. Hunt. Source: Daily Ranchero, September 1, 1867.		
George Duty						
Joseph Duty	March 6, 1801 (Gallatin, TN)	September 11, 1855 (Webberville, TX)				
Clement C. Dyer						
Thomas Earle						
G.E. Edwards						
John Elam						
Robert Elder						
Charles Falenash						
David Fenter						
James Fisher						
David Fitzgerald		1832	Widowed with one son and daughter.	The plot of land now sits in modern Fort Bend County. Fitzgerald died in 1832 and willed the land to his daughter Sarah. She would later sell the entire property to Johnathan Dawson Waters.		
Isaiah Flanakin						
Elisha Flowers						
Isaac Foster						
John Foster		1837	2 sons			
Randolph Foster						
James Frazier						
Churchill Fulshear						
Charles Garret						
Samuel Gates						
William Gates						
Freeman George	1780	1834	Wife, 8 sons	Freeman George received 1 sitios land between San Bernard and Bay Prairie (Matagorda County) and 1 labor of land located Brazos East side opposite San Felipe (Waller County). According to the Handbook of Texas Online, he was given a league and a labor of land (see above) which is known as Matagorda and Waller counties on July 7, 1824. Also one of the original patentees in the vicinity of Old Ocean, Texas, in southwestern Brazoria Co.		
Preston Gilbert						
Sarah Gilbert	1750	1841				
Daniel Gilleland						
Chester S. Gorbet						
Michael Gouldrich						
Thomas Gray						
Jared E. Groce	1782	1836	90 slaves			
Robert Guthrie						
John Haddan						
Samuel C. Hady						
George B. Hall						
John W. Hall						
W. J. Hall						
David Hamilton						
Abner Harris						
David Harris						
John Richardson Harris						
William Harris						
William J. Harris						
George Harrison						
William Harvey						
Thomas S. Haynes						
James Hensley						
Alexander Hodge	1757	1836		Historical marker erected at Hodge's Bend Cemetery in Fort Bend County (1975), where Alexander Hodge's grave is located.		
Francis Holland						
William Holland						
Kinchen Holliman						
James Hope						
C.S. Hudson						
George Huff						
John Huff						
Isaac Hughes						
Eli Hunter						
Johnson Calhoun Hunter	May 22, 1787	May 29, 1855	Wife: Mary Martha Harbert; Children as of March 1826: Robert Hancock Hunter, John Calhoun Hunter, Harriet Harbert Hunter, Thomas Jefferson Hunter, Thaddeus Warsaw Hunter, Messina Hunter, Martha Hunter	Education: Dr. Johnson Hunter, earned a Medical Diploma around 1805. Dr. Johnson & Martha raised 10 children, four girls and six boys. He received a title to a sitio (roughly 4600 acres where La Porte and Morgan's Point, TX are now located) of land from the Mexican government in 1824. In 1826, he sold Hunter's Point (peninsula between Galveston & San Jacinto Bays, now known as Morgans Point and La Porte and relocated to Fort Bend County, where he built a home that served as a Richmond area landmark for fifty years, currently Pecan Grove. In 1855, a five-acre tract of land was donated by Dr. Johnson Hunter on the R.H. Hunter survey and was called the Frost Institute. The institute was organized by Dr. Johnson Hunters' son-in-law. Frost Institute was located approximately six miles north of Richmond. Dr. Hunter was buried in the family cemetery, known as the Brick Church Graveyard.		
John Iiams [sic]				This may be John Williams.		
Ira Ingram	1788	1837				
Seth Ingram						
John Irons	1786	1842	Wife Polly(Baker) Irons and son Elisha B. Irons born in 1826	Settled outside Monaville, Tx near Irons Creek.		
Samuel Isaacks						
Alexander Jackson						
Humphrey Jackson						
Isaac Jackson						
Thomas Jamison						
Henry W. Johnson						
Henry Jones						
James W. Jones						
Oliver Jones						
R. Jones						
Imla Keep						
John C. Keller						
John Kelly						
Samuel Kennedy						
Alfred Kennon						
James Kerr						
Peter Kerr						
William Kerr						
William Kincheloe						
William Kingston						
James Knight						
Abner Kuykendall	1777	1834		Brother of Robert and Joseph, father of Barzillia. Commanded the militia of Austin's colony, murdered by Joseph Clayton.		
Barzillai Kuykendall				Son of Abner Kuykendall		
Joseph Kuykendall						
Robert Kuykendall						
Hosea H. League						
Joel Leakey						
Benjamin Linsey						
John Little						
Jane H. Wilkinson Long	1798	1880		aka. "the Mother of Texas". Widow of filibuster James Long (1793-1822).		
James Lynch						
Nathanael Lynch						
John McCroskey						
Arthur McCormick						
David McCormick						
John McCormick						
Thomas McCoy						
Aechilles McFarlan						
John McFarlan						
Thomas F. McKinney	1801	1873		Father of the Texas Navy		
Hugh McKinsey						
A.W. McClain	1797	1895				
James McNair						
Daniel McNeel						
George W. McNeel						
John McNeel						
John G. McNeel						
Pleasant D. McNeel						
Sterling McNeel						
Elizabeth McNutt						
William McWilliams						
Shubael Marsh						
Wily Martin	1776	1842				
William Mathis						
David H. Milburn						
Samuel Miller						
Samuel R. Miller						
Simon Miller						
James D. Millican						
Robert Millican						
William Millican						
Joseph Mims		1844	Wife Sarah, two sons, one daughter, and four slaves			
Asa Mitchell						
John L. Monks						
John H. Moore	Aug. 13, 1800	Dec. 02, 1880	Single	Indian fighter, builder of Moore's Fort, and leader at the Battle of Gonzales. Married Eliza Cummins, daughter of Jack Cummins listed above.		
Luke Moore						
Moses Morrison						
William Morton						
David Mouser						
James Nelson						
Joseph Newman	c. 1787	1831	Wife Rachel Rabb, 10 children: Mary, William, Eliza, Minerva, Sally, Elizabeth, Thomas, Ali, Joseph Jr. and Andrew.	Son-in-law to William Rabb, and Brother in-law to John Rabb, Andrew Rabb and Thomas J. Rabb, he ranched and farmed a sitio near Bonus, Texas.		Texas State Historical Marker on Farm to Market Road 102 southeast of Bonus, Texas.
Charles Isaac Nidever						
M.B. Nuckols						
James Orrick						
Nathan Osborn						
William Parks						
Joshua Parker						
William Parker						
Isaac Pennington						
George S. Pentecost						
Freeman Pettus						
William A. Pettus						
John Petty						
J.C. Peyton						
James A.E. Phelps						
I.B. Phillips						
Zeno Philips						
Pamelia Picket						
Joseph H. Polley						
Peter Powell						
William Prater						
Pleasant Pruitt						
William Pryor	c. 1775	1833	Wife Betsy Trammell, 6 children	His death was recorded as 9 Sept 1833 in the diary of William B. Travis. Pryor's will states he was from Botetourt County, Virginia He disowned his only son Trammell J Pryor.		
Andrew Rabb				Son of William Rabb, Brother-in-law to Joseph Newman, Brother of Thomas J. Rabb and John Rabb.		
John Rabb				Son of William Rabb, Brother-in-law to Joseph Newman, Brother of Thomas J. Rabb and Andrew Rabb.		
Thomas J. Rabb				Son of William Rabb, Brother-in-law to Joseph Newman, Brother of John Rabb and Andrew Rabb.		
William Rabb				Father to Andrew Rabb, John Rabb and Thomas J. Rabb, Father-in-law to Joseph Newman.		
William Raleigh						
L. Ramey						
David Randon						
John Randon						
Frederic H. Rankin						
Amos Rawls						
Benjamin Rawls						
Daniel Rawls						
Stephen Richardson						
Elijah Roark	1782	1829	Son: Leo Andrew Elijah Roark and Wife: Cynthia Elijah Fisher			
Earle Robbins						
William Robbins						
Andrew Roberts		1844	Wife Sally, four daughters, and one son			
Noel F. Roberts	C. 1786	C. 1843	Harriet Pryor			
William Roberts	1813	Jul 1849	Elizabeth Pryor			
Edward Robertson						
Andrew Robinson Sr.		1852	Wife Nancy and two children	First settler		Texas Historical Marker for Andrew Robinson Sr.
George Robinson						
James Ross						
June Salmeron						
Joseph San Pierre						
Robert Scobey						
Marvin Scheick						
James Scott						
William Scott						
William Selkirk	1792	1830	2 children	Helped found Matagorda and served as militia captain.		
David Shelby						
Daniel Shipman	NC 20 Feb 1801	Goliad County Texas 4 Mar 1881		Son of Moses Shipman		
Moses Shipman	1774 NC	1 Jan 1838 Ft. Bend, TX	Mary Robinson, ten children	Father of Daniel Shipman		
Bartlet Sims						
George Washington Singleton				Related to Charla Kaye Moore Sisk		
Philip Singleton				Daughter Mary King married John D. Taylor November 19, 1838		
Christian Smith						
Cornelius Smith						
John Smith						
William Smeathers	1767	1837				
Gabriel S. Snider						
Albert L. Sojourner						
Nancy Spencer						
Adam Stafford						
William Stafford	1780	1840				
Thomas Stevens						
Owen H. Stout						
John Strange						
Walter Sutherland						
Elemelech Swearingen	1805	1887	Last family of the Old 300; replaced a family who withdrew their application.			Historical marker for Elemelech Swearingen
David Tally						
John D. Taylor				Married Mary King Singleton, daughter of Philip Singleton, November 19, 1838; they had two children Jeanette Susan 1841–1915 and Isabell 1842–1925		
George Teel						
Ezekiel Thomas						
Jacob Thomas						
Jesse Thompson						
Thomas J. Tone						
James F. Tong	1783	July 29, 1827	Elizabeth Thompson, 1 Child- Harriet E. Tong (1817–1884)	Father- William H. Tong (1756–1848) Revolutionary Way Minuteman in Maryland, fought at Bradywine and Germantown with George Washington. William Tong, 2 wives and 26 children		
Samuel Toy						
John Trobough						
Elizabeth Piemmons Tumlinson	1778	1829	Wife of John Jackson Tumlinson who was killed by Waco Indians while crossing the Guadalupe river			
James Tumlinson						
Isaac Vandorn						
Martin Varner						
Allen Vince						
Richard Vince						
Robert Vince						
William Vince						
James Walker	1756	1837				
Thomas Walker						
Caleb Wallice						
Francis F. Wells						
Amy White						
Joseph White						
Reuben White						
Walter C. White						
William White						
Boland Whitesides						
Henry Whitesides						
James Whitesides						
William Whitesides						
Nathaniel Whiting						
William Whitlock						
Elias R. Wightman	1792	1841	Married Mary Sherwood Wightman in 1828	Helped found Matagorda and surveyed Austin's colony.		
Jane Wilkins	1787	c. 1848				
George I. Williams						
Henry Williams						
John Williams						
John R. Williams				Built "The Old Place" along Clear Creek, which eventually became the oldest remaining structure in Harris County, Texas. It is now part of Houston's Sam Houston Park		
Robert H. Williams						
Samuel M. Williams						
Solomon Williams						
Thomas Williams						
Zadock Woods aka Zaduck	1773	1842	Wife Minerva Cottle Woods	Served in the battle of Gonzales, the battle of Concepción, the Grass Fight and the Runaway Scrape. Colonist of Texas, Zadock Woods was one of the "Old Three Hundred" who established a colony area with land purchased from Stephen F. Austin. A veteran of the War of 1812, he served in the battle of Gonzales, the battle of Concepción, the Grass Fight and the Runaway Scrape. His homestead was a fortified inn, known as Fort Woods, built to provide protection from Indian attacks on the colonists. He was the oldest man killed in the "Dawson expedition" September 1842.		Memorial Stone erected by the State of Texas 1936 at the site of Woods Fort

== Bibliography ==
- Cantrell, Gregg (2001), Stephen F. Austin, empresario of Texas, New Haven: Yale University Press, ISBN 978-0-300-09093-2
- Davis, William C. (2006), Lone Star Rising, College Station, TX: Texas A&M University Press, ISBN 978-1-58544-532-5 originally published 2004 by New York: Free Press
- Edmondson, J.R. (2000), The Alamo Story-From History to Current Conflicts, Plano, TX: Republic of Texas Press, ISBN 1-55622-678-0
- Greaser, Galen (1999), "Foreword", Austin's Old Three Hundred: The First Anglo Colony in Texas, Austin, TX: Eakin Press, ISBN 1-57168-291-0
- Hatch, Thom (1999), Encyclopedia of the Alamo and the Texas revolution, Jefferson, N.C.: McFarland, ISBN 978-0-7864-0593-0
