= James E.B. Austin =

American settler (1803–1829)

Coat of Arms of James E.B. Austin

James Elijah Brown Austin (October 3, 1803 – August 14, 1829) was an American settler and brother of empresario Stephen F. Austin, "The Father of Texas." Counted also as one of the Old Three Hundred, he is listed in Spanish and Mexican records as "Santiago E.B. Austin". James and Stephen F. Austin are both brothers of Emily Margaret Brown Austin.

Born in Missouri, James attended high school in Washington, Connecticut before joining Stephen in Texas in December, 1821. Three years later, having established residence, he was granted title to three leagues west of the Brazos River, including Eagle Nest and Manor lakes; a labor in west Brazoria County; and another labor in Waller County. He went back to Missouri in May 1824 to bring his mother Maria Brown Austin and sister Emily down to Texas but returned the next year without them.

James entered into a partnership with John Austin to participate in the coasting trade and retail, opening a store together in Brazoria, Texas. He lobbied in Saltillo, the capital of Coahuila and Texas, for the continuance of slavery and succeeded in protecting the ownership of settlers already established. He returned from the capital with 300 Spanish horses. With his brother, he opposed the Fredonian Rebellion of 1827.

James married Eliza Martha Westall March 20, 1828. He named his son Stephen F. Austin Jr. James died on August 14, 1829 in New Orleans of yellow fever.

== Sources ==
- Charles A. Bacarisse: James Elijah Brown Austin from the Handbook of Texas Online. Retrieved 1 February 2010.
- Jones, Marie Beth (1982), Peach Point Plantation: The First 150 Years, Texian Press, ISBN 0-9630042-0-4
