= Moses Austin =

American businessman and Spanish empressario

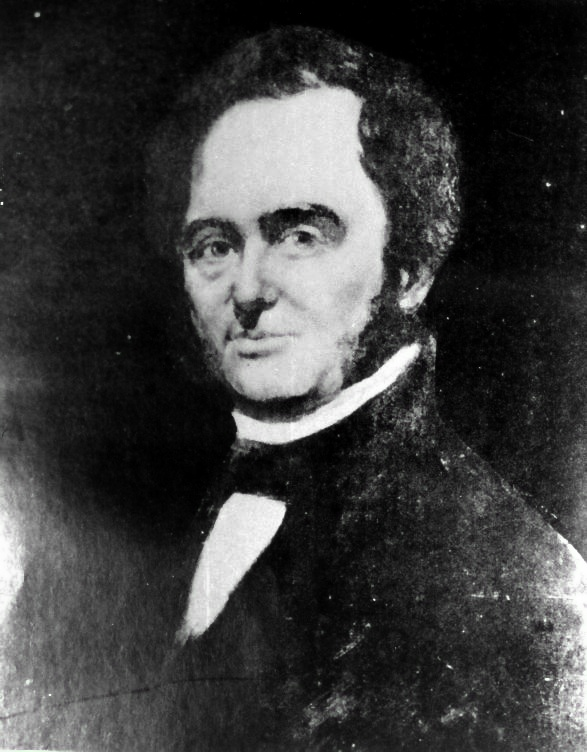
- Portrait of Moses Austin
- Born: October 4, 1761; Durham, Connecticut, Connecticut Colony
- Died: June 10, 1821 (aged 59); Missouri Territory, United States
- Occupations: Businessman, empresario
- Known for: Being awarded the first land grant to settle Anglo-Americans in Spanish Texas
- Spouse: Mary Brown Austin
- Children: Stephen F. Austin, Emily Austin Perry, James Elijah Brown Austin
- Relatives: Nannie Webb Curtis, Henry Austin

Moses Austin (October 4, 1761 – June 10, 1821) was an American businessman and pioneer who played a large part in the development of the lead industry in the early United States, especially in southwest Virginia and Missouri. He was the father of Stephen F. Austin, one of the earliest American settlers of Texas, which was at the time part of Mexico.

After receiving a land grant from the Spanish Crown in 1820, Moses Austin planned to be the first to establish an American settlement in Spanish Texas, but he died before his dream was realized. On his deathbed, he pleaded with his son to fulfill his dream to colonize Texas. Stephen led the large group of settlers from Missouri who colonized the northern reaches of then-sovereign Mexico in 1825, and in time, the settlers demanded autonomy and later won independence from Mexico under President Antonio López de Santa Anna, thereby establishing the Republic of Texas.

== Biography ==
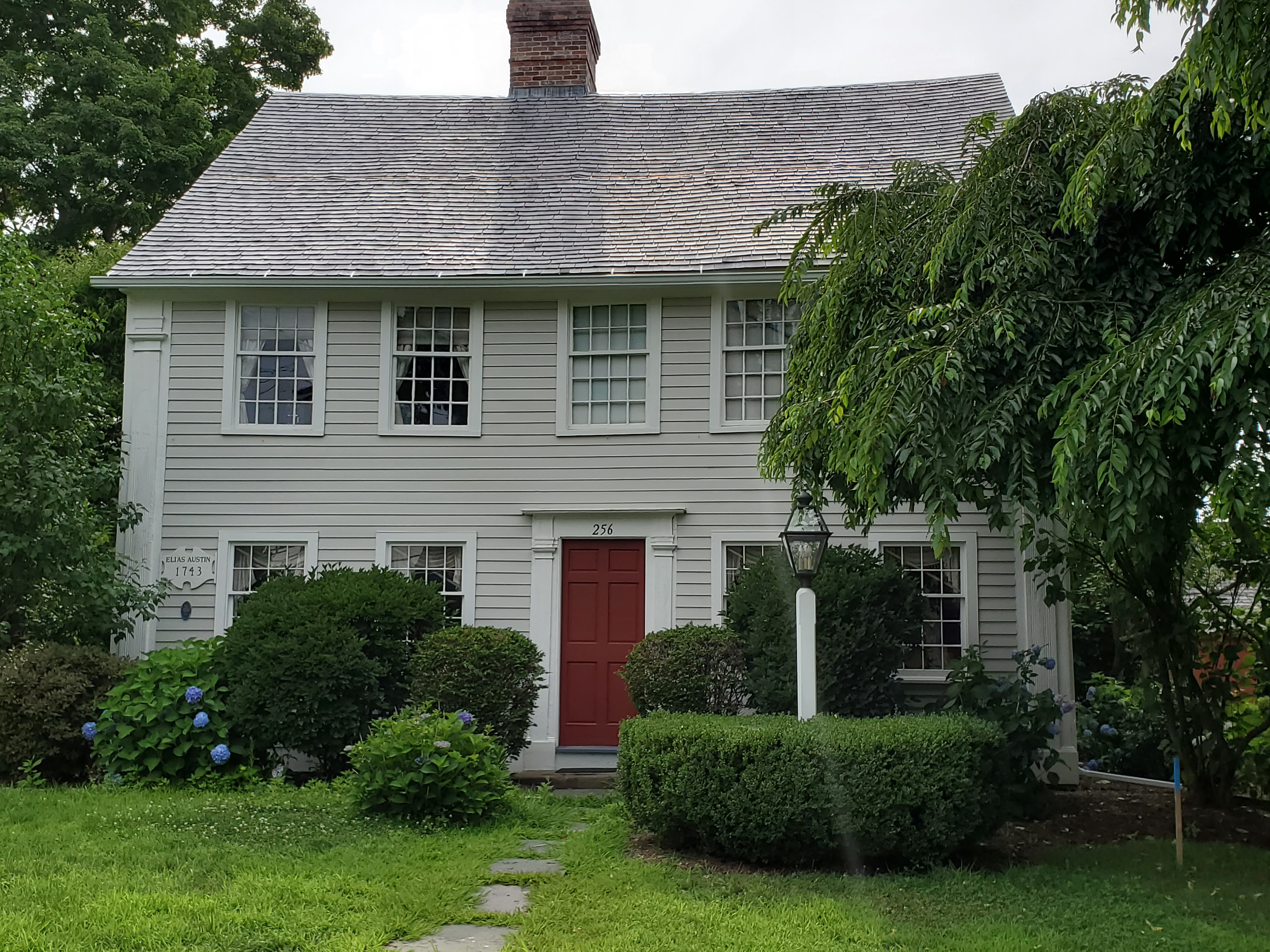
Elias Austin House in Durham, Connecticut, birthplace of Moses Austin, July 2020

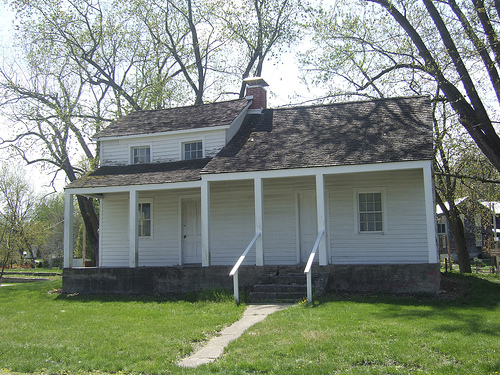
Moses Austin house in Ste. Genevieve, Missouri, April 2007

Moses Austin was born October 4, 1761, to Elias Austin and Eunice Phelps Austin in Durham, Connecticut. He is a descendant of Richard Austin on his paternal side.

In 1784, he moved to Philadelphia to enter the dry goods business with his brother, Stephen. He then moved to Richmond, Virginia, to open a second dry goods store. In 1785, he married into the affluent iron mining family of Mary Brown, who then became known as Mary Brown Austin. The Austins' first two children, Anna Maria (born 1787) and Eliza Fuller (born 1790), died in infancy. A son born in 1793 was named Stephen Fuller Austin in honor of his father's brother and his mother's great uncle. Their daughter Emily Austin followed in 1795, and their fifth child, James Elijah Brown Austin, was born in 1803.

Austin sought to start his own mining business in southwestern Virginia, and in 1789 he traveled there to look at a lead mine. Moses saw potential in the site and by 1791 his family had joined him in what is now Wythe County. Moses and his brother Stephen and several other partners and individuals industrialized the area. Several smelters, furnaces, commissaries, blacksmith shops, liveries, and mills were established. The tiny village around the mines became known as "Austinville", and Moses came to be known as the "Lead King".

The Austin brothers soon incurred debts, causing the collapse of the company. After the Virginia lead business failed, Moses skipped out to avoid imprisonment and the consequences of debt, which was then customary for debtors in the U.S. under traditional English law (now being developed for U.S. federal and state codes), and looked toward the rich lead deposits in Missouri, then a part of upper Spanish Louisiana. In December 1797, Austin and a companion traveled to investigate the Spanish mines. Stephen remained behind to salvage the Virginia business, creating a rift between the two brothers that would last for much of the rest of their lives. The state of Virginia seized much of the property Moses owned and broke up the various operations, which were later purchased from the state at great discounts by Thomas Jackson and his partners — they would later build the Jackson Ferry Shot Tower, one of the few extant shot towers in United States, at this location.

In 1798, the Spanish colonial government granted to Moses one league of land (4,428 acres) to undertake lead mining operations. In return he swore allegiance to the Spanish Crown and stated he would settle some families in Missouri. Travelling to Missouri, Austin worked with Francois Valle to identify his claims and to learn the practices of lead mining in Missouri. Valle and other French colonizers had long used enslaved African Americans and enslaved Native Americans to mine, and Austin immediately took to these practices. In 1798, the year of his arrival in Missouri, he purchased at least one enslaved man. Moses greatly expanded the use of enslaved men and women in running mining operations in Missouri. Enslaved African American men were used for the hard, difficult labor of digging the lead ore and processing it. Enslaved boys were forced to man the carts that carried ore from the pits to the smelters. Enslaved women and girls were used to prepare food for the enslaved men who worked the mines, pits, and smelting operations.

In 1803, Missouri came under the jurisdiction of the United States as part of the Louisiana Purchase. Austin became founder and principal stockholder in the Bank of St. Louis, but the bank failed in the Panic of 1819, causing him to lose his entire fortune. He again sought help from Spain. In 1820, Austin traveled to the Presidio San Antonio de Béxar in Spanish Texas and presented a plan to colonize Texas with Anglo-Americans to Governor Antonio María Martínez. In 1821, the governor asked Austin's friend, Erasmo Seguín, to give him the news that he had been awarded a land grant and permission to settle three hundred families in Texas. On Austin's return trip, he became ill, and he died in June 1821, shortly after arriving back in Missouri. His son Stephen F. Austin carried out his colonization plan several years later, and led the three hundred families to what became the first Anglo-American settlement in Texas.

In 1885, the legality of Austin's Spanish property claims were settled posthumously by the U.S. Supreme Court in Bryan v. Kennett.

== Family ==
Moses Austin had many relatives who helped settle Texas, including Stephen F. Austin and Emily Austin Perry (daughter), Moses Austin Bryan (grandson), and others. His nephew Henry Austin, later a Texas settler, acted as Moses Austin's eastern agent for roughly a decade beginning in 1806.

Moses Austin should be distinguished from his grandson Moses Austin Bryan. James Bryan was his first son-in-law; James F. Perry was his second son-in-law. The Missouri State Archives reflect that Moses Austin lived in a mansion called Durham Hall, named for his birth town of Durham, Connecticut.

== Settlement in Texas ==
=== Motivation to settle ===
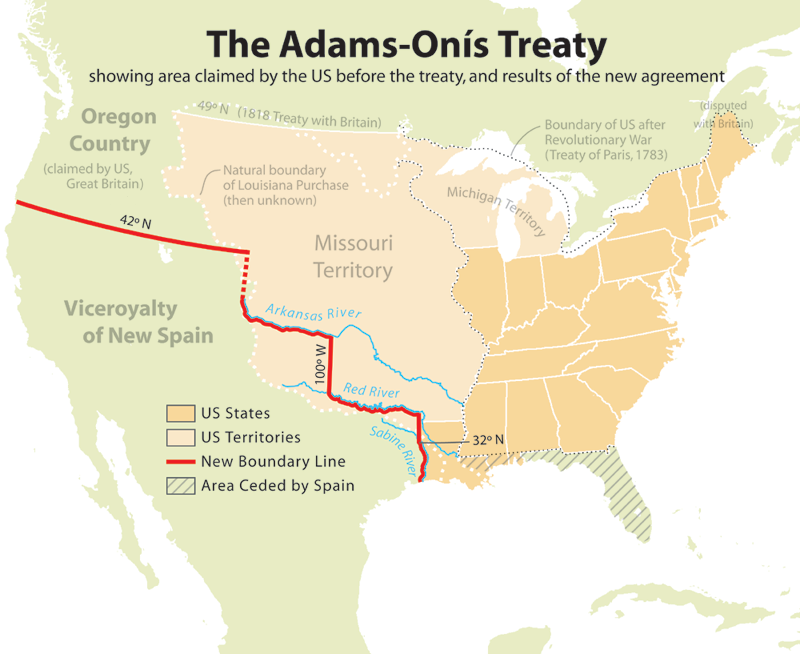
Displays the new border established by the Adams–Onís Treaty, making Texas part of Spain.

Moses Austin attempted various economic ventures before his plans to settle in Texas came to fruition. Austin failed to successfully maintain the St. Louis Bank and his financial situation suffered from unfavorable shipment deals. Austin's desperation reached a climax in 1820 when a Missouri sheriff threatened to break down his door to collect past debts. Austin's son, Stephen F. Austin, also continued to seek employment in Mississippi and Arkansas to help his poor financial situation. In November 1820, Austin learned that the United States passed the Adams–Onís Treaty with Spain, which situated present-day Texas in New Spain's territory. Moses Austin hoped the Spanish government would permit free trade with the United States so he left for Texas to try and begin a new economic venture. Mary Brown Austin, Moses Austin's wife, wrote to her cousin explaining Moses's plans to colonize Texas in order to provide for their family.

=== Negotiations with Spain ===
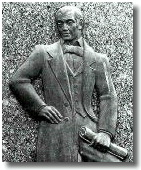
Monument of Baron de Bastrop, Austin's business partner in Texas.

Austin's primary intention was to create a trading venture on the coast of Texas to allow the United States to trade with New Spain. On December 23, 1820, Austin arrived in San Antonio to begin negotiations with the Spanish government to establish a trading post. After some difficulty on his own, Austin paired with a Spanish interpreter, Felipe Enrique Neri, Baron de Bastrop, who agreed to join Austin and plan a settlement called "Austina" which would be located somewhere on the coast of Texas. On December 26, 1820, Austin and Felipe Enrique Neri, Baron de Bastrop presented a formal petition to Governor Antonio María Martínez. They requested permission to bring three hundred families to a port in Texas. Most importantly, Austin insisted that the settlers were former subjects of Spain and would be willing to defend the land against foreign enemies. Austin convinced Spain to reinstate the empresario system in Texas, which resulted in permission to begin a new settlement in Texas. This outdated reward system granted tracts of land to immigrants who pledged their allegiance to the Spanish crown. Therefore, Austin's settlement was contingent upon its allegiance to the Spanish Crown.

=== Plan for settlement ===
After returning from successful negotiations in San Antonio, Austin returned to Missouri to recruit settlers for his new settlement. In April, he created a "Form of Contract for Emigration to Texas" which detailed the obligations of each member joining the settlement in Texas. Austin required emigrants to help build community structures. He also ordered the settlers to own a "Spanish carbine", a type of gun, to protect the settlement. Austin's relationship with the settlers he recruited was not one of mutual respect, but rather he employed the settlers. Austin contracted his settlers to work from their departure in May, until the following January. In return, Austin guaranteed transportation along with the necessary tools and provisions to begin the settlement. Although Moses Austin died prior to his planned departure, his son, Stephen F. Austin, continued his efforts to colonize Texas. Austin triggered such a substantial movement of people into Texas that the land became inundated with Americans. Austin's push to settle Texas contributed to the Texas Revolution in 1836 which foreshadowed Texas's integration into the United States in 1845.

== Death ==
Austin died of pneumonia. His tomb is located in Potosi, Missouri.

== Gallery ==
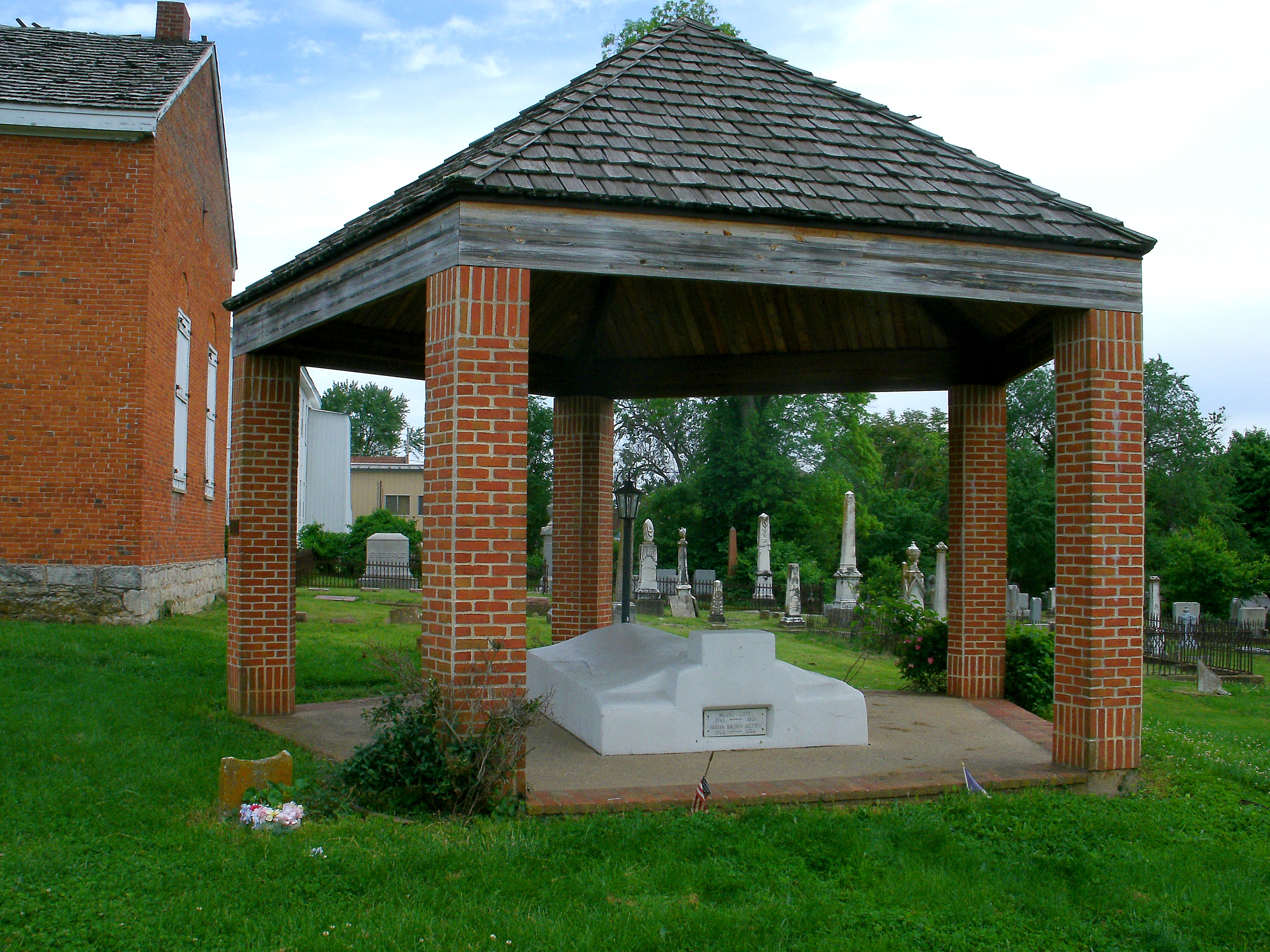
Tomb of Moses and Maria Brown Austin

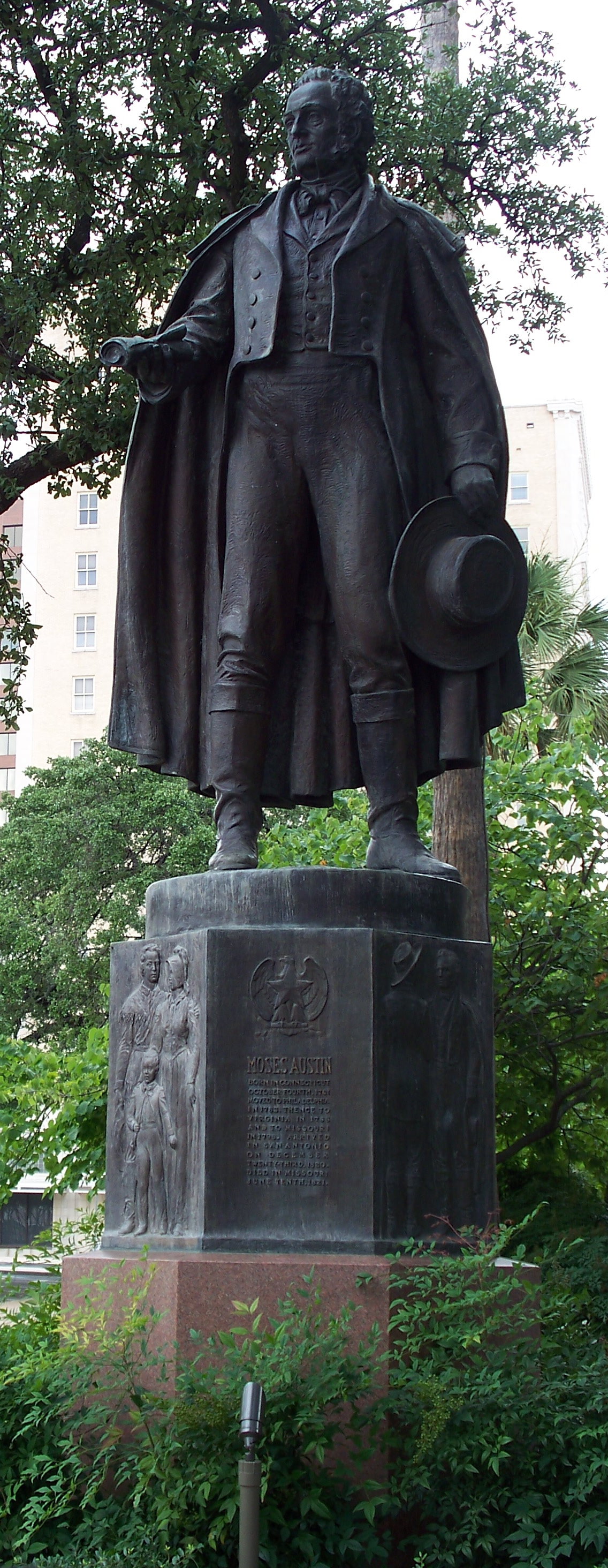
Moses Austin statue, San Antonio, Texas
