= Stephen F. Austin =

American empresario (1793–1836)

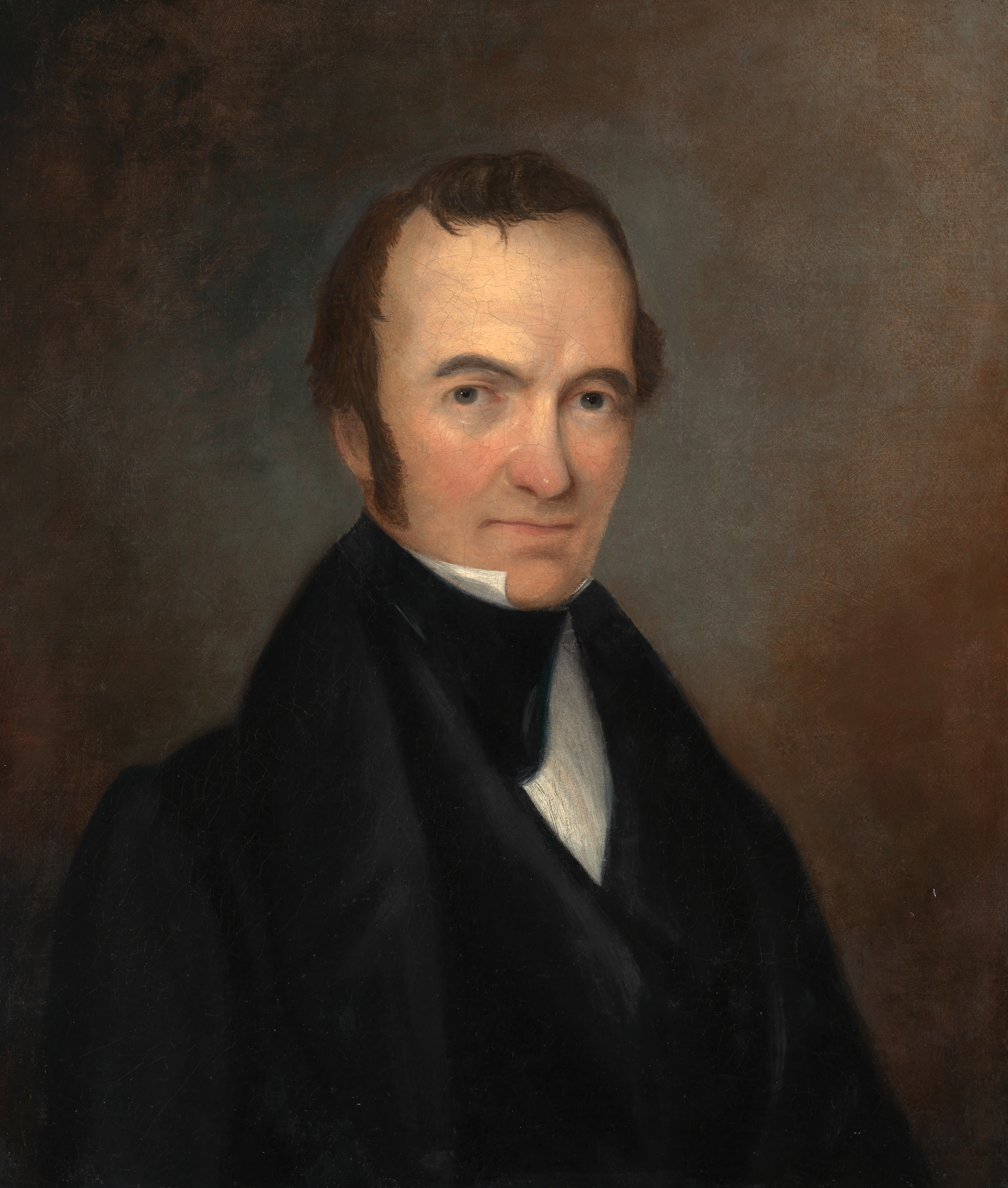
- Posthumous portrait c. 1840

4th Secretary of State of Texas
- In office October 22, 1836 – December 27, 1836
- President: Sam Houston
- Preceded by: William Houston Jack
- Succeeded by: James Pinckney Henderson

Member of the Missouri Territorial Legislature
- In office 1814–1820

Personal details
- Born: Stephen Fuller Austin; November 3, 1793 Wythe County, Virginia, United States
- Died: December 27, 1836 (aged 43) West Columbia, Brazoria County, Republic of Texas
- Relations: Richard Austin (colonist); Nannie Webb Curtis; Mary Austin Holley (cousin); Henry Austin (cousin)
- Parents: Moses Austin; Mary Brown Austin
- Occupation: Politician, empresario
- Known for: Being the "Father of Texas"

Stephen Fuller Austin (November 3, 1793 – December 27, 1836) was an American-born empresario, a person granted the right to settle on land in exchange for recruiting and taking responsibility for settling the eastern areas of the Tejas region of Mexico in the early nineteenth century. Known as the "Father of Texas" and the founder of Anglo Texas, he led the second and, ultimately, the successful colonization of the region by bringing 300 families and their slaves from the United States in 1825.

Born in Virginia and raised in southeastern Missouri, Austin served in the Missouri territorial legislature. He moved to Arkansas Territory and later to Louisiana. His father, Moses Austin, received an empresario grant from Spain to settle Texas. After Moses Austin died in 1821, Stephen Austin won recognition of the empresario grant from the newly independent nation of Mexico.

Austin attracted numerous Anglo-American settlers to move to Texas, and by 1825, Austin had brought the first 300 American families into the territory. These settlers were known as the “Old Three Hundred.” Throughout the 1820s, Austin sought to maintain good relations with the Mexican government and helped suppress the Fredonian Rebellion. He also helped ensure the introduction of slavery into Texas despite the Mexican government's opposition to the institution. Austin led the genocidal policies of extermination against the Indigenous Karankawa people in this area.

As Texas settlers became increasingly dissatisfied with the Mexican government, Austin advocated conciliation, but the dissent against Mexico escalated into the Texas Revolution. Austin led Texas forces at the successful siege of Béxar before serving as a commissioner to the United States. Austin ran as a candidate in the 1836 Texas presidential election but was defeated by Sam Houston, who had served as a general in the war and entered the race two weeks before the election. Houston appointed Austin as Secretary of State for the new republic, and Austin held that position until his death two weeks later in December 1836.

Numerous places and institutions are named in his honor, including the capital of Texas.

== Early years ==
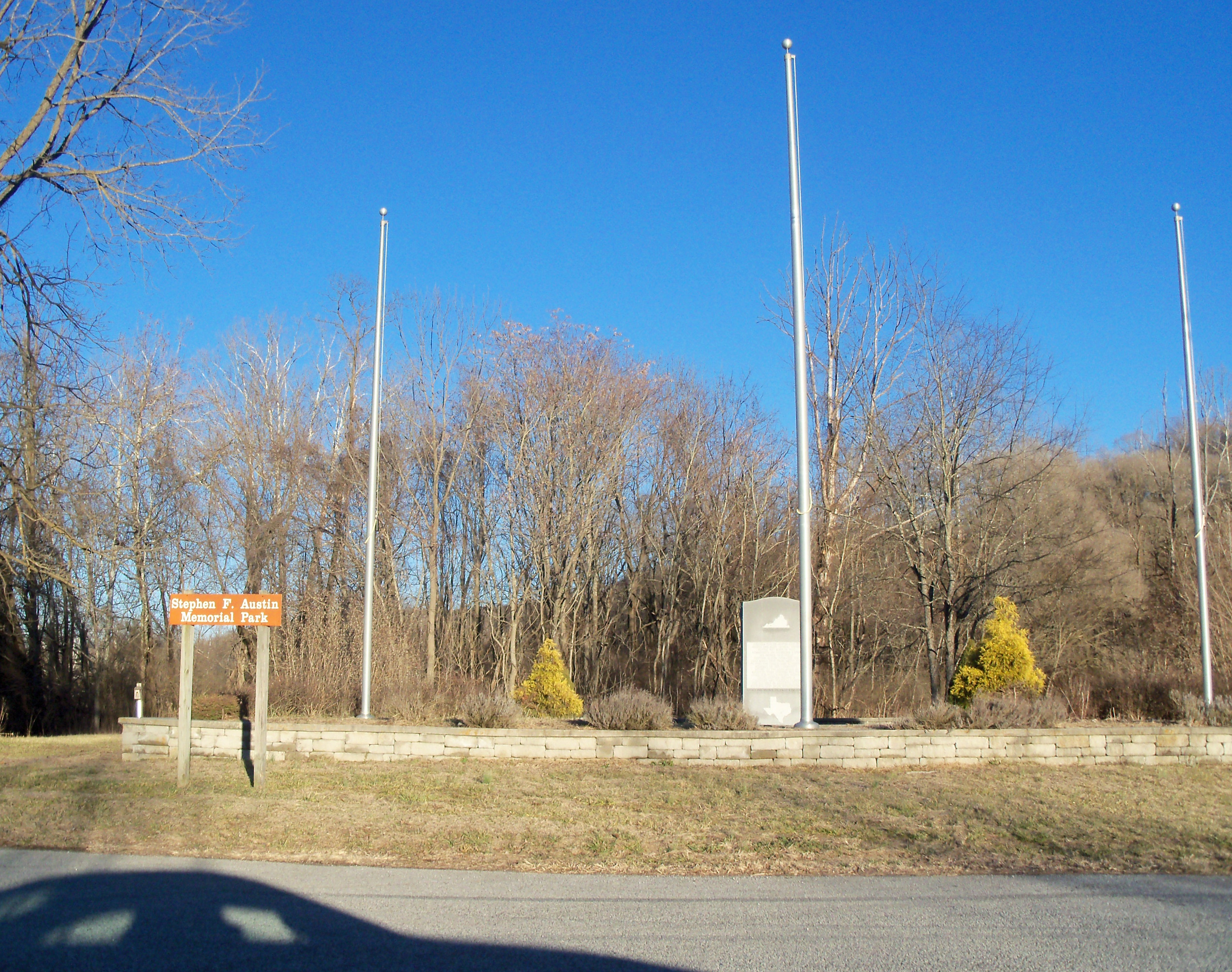
Memorial to Stephen F. Austin in his birthplace

Stephen F. Austin was born on November 3, 1793, in the mining region of southwestern Virginia. His parents were Mary Brown Austin and Moses Austin. In 1798, his family moved west to the lead-mining region of present-day Potosi, Missouri. Moses Austin received a sitio from the Spanish government for the mining site of Mine à Breton, which had been established by French colonists.

His great-great-grandfather, Anthony Austin (b. 1636), was the son of Richard Austin (b.1598 in Bishopstoke, Hampshire, England). The immigrant ancestors, Richard Austin and his wife Esther, were original settlers of Suffield, Massachusetts, which became Connecticut in 1749.

When Austin was eleven years old, his family sent him back East to be educated, first at the preparatory school of Bacon Academy in Colchester, Connecticut. He studied at Transylvania University in Lexington, Kentucky, from which he graduated in 1810. After graduation, Austin began studying to be a lawyer, reading the law with an established firm.

At age 21, he was elected to and served in the Missouri Territory legislature. There, he was "influential in obtaining a charter for the struggling Bank of St. Louis". Left penniless after the Panic of 1819, Austin decided to move south to the new Arkansas Territory.

He acquired property on the south bank of the Arkansas River, in the area that would later become Little Rock. After purchasing the property, he learned the area was being considered as the location for the new territorial capital, which could make his land worth a great deal more. He made his home in Hempstead County, Arkansas. Austin declared his candidacy for Congress two weeks before the first Arkansas territorial elections in 1820. His late entrance meant his name did not appear on the ballot in two of the five counties, but he still placed second in the field of six candidates. Later, he was appointed as a First Circuit Court judge. Little Rock was designated as the territorial capital over the next few months. But Austin's claim to land in the area was contested, and the courts ruled against him. The Territorial Assembly reorganized the government and abolished Austin's judgeship.

Austin left the territory and moved to Louisiana. He reached New Orleans in November 1820. He met and stayed with Joseph H. Hawkins, a New Orleans lawyer and former Kentucky congressman, and made arrangements to study law with him.

== Move to Texas ==
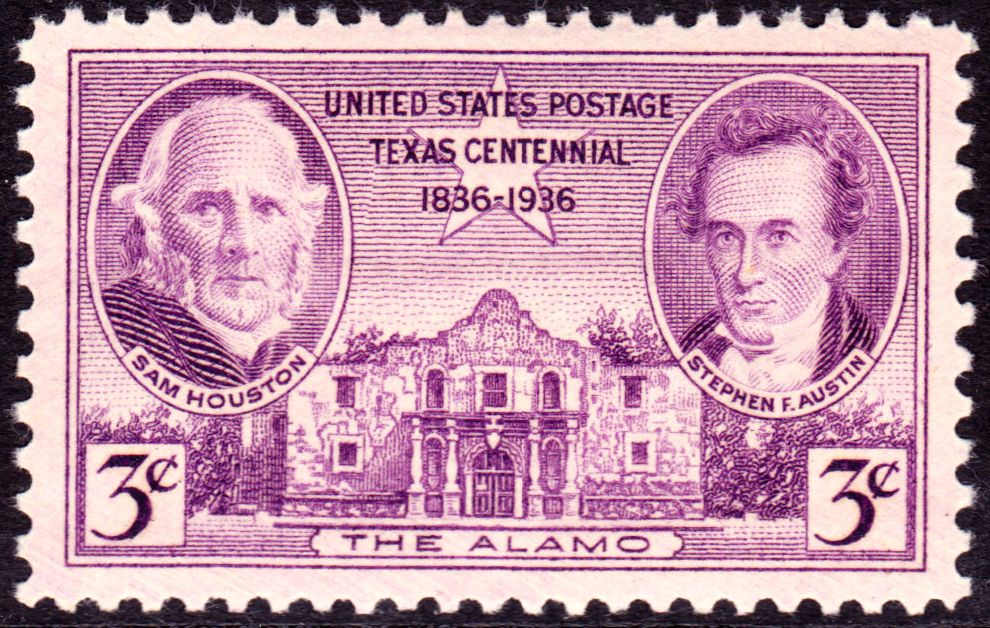
Sam Houston and Stephen Austin depicted on the Texas Centennial Issue postage stamp of 1936

During Austin's time in Arkansas, his father traveled to Spanish Texas and received an empresarial grant that would allow him to bring 300 American families to Texas. Moses Austin caught pneumonia soon after returning to Missouri. He directed that his empresario grant would be taken over by his son Stephen. Although Austin was reluctant to carry on his father's Texas venture, he was persuaded to do so by a letter from his mother, written two days before Moses's death.

Austin boarded the steamer Beaver and departed to New Orleans to meet Spanish officials led by Erasmo Seguín. He was at Natchitoches, Louisiana, in 1821 when he learned of his father's death. "This news has effected me very much, he was one of the most feeling and affectionate Fathers that ever lived. His faults I now say, and always have, were not of the heart."

Austin led his party to travel 300 miles (480 km) in four weeks to San Antonio, with the intent of reauthorizing his father's grant; they arrived on August 12. While in transit, they learned Mexico had declared its independence from Spain, and Texas had become a Mexican province rather than a Spanish territory. José Antonio Navarro, a San Antonio native with ambitious visions of the future of Texas, befriended Stephen F. Austin, and the two developed a lasting association. Navarro, proficient in Spanish and Mexican law, assisted Austin in obtaining his empresario contracts. In San Antonio, the grant was reauthorized by Governor Antonio María Martínez, who allowed Austin to explore the Gulf Coast between San Antonio and the Brazos River to find a suitable location for a colony. As guides for the party, Manuel Becerra and three Aranama Indians went with the expedition.

Austin advertised the Texas opportunity in New Orleans, announcing that land was available along the Brazos and Colorado rivers. A family of a husband, wife, and two children would receive 1,280 acres (520 ha) at twelve and a half cents per acre. Farmers could get 177 acres (72 ha) and ranchers 4,428 acres (1,792 ha). In December 1821, the first U.S. colonists crossed into the granted territory by land and sea on the Brazos River in present-day Brazoria County.

== Empresario ==
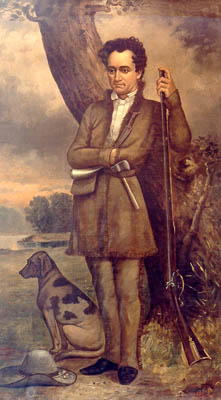
Portrait of Austin, 1833

Austin's plan for an American colony was thrown into turmoil by Mexico's gaining independence from Spain in 1821. Governor Martínez informed Austin that the junta instituyente, the new rump congress of the government of Agustín de Iturbide of Mexico, refused to recognize the land grant authorized by Spain. His government intended to use a general immigration law to regulate new settlement in Mexico. Austin traveled to Mexico City, where he persuaded the junta instituyente to approve the grant to his father and the law signed by the Mexican Emperor on January 3, 1823.

The old imperial law offered heads of families a league and a labor of land, 4,605 acres (1,864 ha), and other inducements. It also provided for the employment of agents, called empresarios, to promote immigration. As an empresario, Austin was to receive 67,000 acres of land for each 200 families he brought to Texas. According to the law, immigrants were not required to pay fees to the government. Some of the immigrants denied Austin's right to charge them for services at the rate of 12.5 cents/acre (31 cents/ha).

When Emperor of Mexico Agustín de Iturbide abdicated in March 1823, the law was annulled once again. In April 1823, Austin induced the congress to grant him a contract to bring 300 families into Texas. He wanted honest, hard-working people who would make the colony a success. In 1824, the congress passed a new immigration law that allowed the individual states of Mexico to administer public lands and open them to settlement under certain conditions. In March 1825, the legislature of the Mexican state of Coahuila y Tejas passed a law similar to the one authorized by Iturbide. The law continued the system of empresarios and granted each married man a league of land, 4,428 acres (1,792 ha), stipulating that he must pay the state $30 within six years.

Austin sought an area for his colonists on the land near the mouth of the Colorado River (Texas) for a colony that could provide a good supply of clean, potable water. Austin claimed rich tracts of land near bays and river mouths already populated by the Karankawa. The Karankawa relied on these bays for the fish and shellfish that provided their winter food sources and thus were fiercely protective of that land.

Austin was greeted by the native Karankawa inhabitants with the help of his Mexican scouts, they watched closely as the immigrants unloaded their goods, so that their two sloops could navigate safely up the shallows of the Colorado River. When the Karankawa noticed that only four armed men were guarding the merchandise of 300 immigrants, they made their attack, killing the guards and plundering the articles.

On February 23, 1823, the Karankawa killed two men, named Loy and John C. Alley, and wounded another named John C. Clark. They were bringing home a canoe full of corn on the Colorado River near the mouth of Skull Creek. Later the same evening, Robert Brotherton was riding along a trail near Skull Creek when he was "met by the Indians, robbed of his guns and perceiving he was in danger of his life after making his escape, was wounded in the back with an arrow, very severely. A volunteer militia was organized and went to the scene of the robbery. They followed the tracks to a nearby encampment and slew nineteen of them, scalped them and plundered their camp", wrote one of the participants, John H. Moore. This event became known as the Skull Creek massacre.

Austin wrote that extermination of the Karankawa would be necessary, even though his first encounter with the tribe was friendly. He talked to the settlers of cannibalism and extreme violence of the Karankawa, sometimes more specifically the Carancaguases. Research had suggested that these accusations of cannibalism were false, possibly caused by confusion with another tribe, and that the Karankawa were horrified by cannibalism when they learned of it being practiced by shipwrecked Spaniards. Austin told the colonists that the Karankawa would be impossible to live among. Austin continued to encourage violence both against and between the Indian tribes, culminating in 1825 with his order for all Kawankawa to be pursued and killed on sight.

By late 1825, Austin had brought the first 300 families to his settlement, the Austin Colony; these 300 are now known in Texas history as the Old Three Hundred. Austin had obtained further contracts to settle an additional 900 families between 1825 and 1829. He had effective civil and military authority over the settlers, but he quickly introduced a semblance of American law – the Constitution of Coahuila y Tejas was agreed on in November 1827. Austin organized small, informal armed groups to protect the colonists, which evolved into the Texas Rangers. Despite his hopes, Austin was making little money from his endeavors; the colonists were unwilling to pay for his services as empresario, and most of his revenues were spent on the processes of government and other public services.

During these years, Austin, a Louisiana Lodge No. 111 member at Ste. Genevieve, Missouri, sought to establish Freemasonry in Texas. Freemasonry was well established among the educated classes of Mexican society. It had been introduced among the aristocracy loyal to the House of Bourbon, and the conservatives had total control over the Order. By 1827, Americans living in Mexico City had introduced the United States York Rite of Freemasonry as a liberal alternative to the established European-style Scottish Rite. On February 11, 1828, Austin called a meeting of Freemasons at San Felipe to elect officers and to petition the Masonic Grand Lodge in Mexico City for a charter to form a lodge. Austin was elected Worshipful Master of the new lodge. Although the petition reached Matamoros and was to be forwarded to Mexico City, nothing more was heard. By 1828, the ruling faction in Mexico feared the liberal elements in Texas might try to gain their independence. Fully aware of the political philosophies of American Freemasons, the Mexican government outlawed Freemasonry on October 25, 1828. In 1829, Austin called another meeting, where it was decided that it was "impolitic and imprudent, at this time, to form Masonic lodges in Texas".

He was active in promoting trade and currying the good favor of the Mexican authorities, aiding them in the suppression of the Fredonian Rebellion of Haden Edwards. Some historians consider the Fredonian Rebellion the beginning of the Texas Revolution. Although "premature ... the Fredonian Rebellion sparked the powder for later success." For this event, Austin raised troops to fight with Mexican troops against the Texas rebels. With the colonists numbering more than 11,000 by 1832, they were becoming less amenable to Austin's cautious leadership, and the Mexican government was becoming less cooperative. It was concerned with the colony's growth and the U.S. government's efforts to buy the state from them. The Mexican government had attempted to stop further U.S. immigration as early as April 1830, but Austin's skills gained an exemption for his colonies. He granted land to immigrants based on 640 acres (2.6 km^{2}) to the husband, 320 to the wife, 160 for every child, and 80 for every enslaved person.

== Slavery ==
Slavery was a very important issue to Austin, one he called "of great interest" to him. Austin was a periodical enslaver throughout his life; however, he had conflicting views about it. Theoretically, he believed slavery was wrong and went against the American ideal of liberty. In practice, however, he agreed with the social, economic, and political justifications for it and worked hard to defend and expand it. Despite his defense of it, he also harbored concerns that the long-term effects of slavery would destroy American society. He grew particularly concerned following Nat Turner's rebellion in 1831, stating:

"I sometimes shudder at the consequences and think that a large part of America will be Santo Domingonized in 100, or 200 years. The idea of seeing such a country as this overrun by a slave population almost makes me weep. It is in vain to tell a North American that the white population will be destroyed some fifty or eighty years hence by the negroes, and that his daughters will be violated and Butchered by them."

While Austin thought it would be advantageous someday for Texas to phase out of slavery, up until the Texas Revolution, he worked to ensure that his colony's immigrants could bypass the Mexican government's resistance to it. Doing so ensured the population growth and economic development of his colony, which was primarily dependent on the monocropping of cotton and sugar. In August 1825, he recommended that the state government allow immigrants to bring people they were enslaving with them through 1840, with the caveat that female grandchildren of the enslaved people would be freed by age 15 and males by age 25. His recommendation was rejected.

In 1826, when a state committee proposed abolishing slavery outright, 25 percent of the people in Austin's colony were enslaved. Austin's colonists, mostly pro-slavery immigrants from the south, threatened to leave Texas if the proposition passed, while prospective Southern immigrants hesitated to come to Texas until slavery was guaranteed there. Austin conceded that his colony's success depended on slavery. Without enslaved people, the colonists would lack the mass labor to cultivate the land, which would stall the pace of immigration needed to develop and increase the land's value, deflate the economy, and motivate his colonists to leave.

Austin went before the legislature and pleaded that, at the least, his original 300 families should be allowed to continue enslaving people. He argued against the "bad faith" of freeing them, demanded reparations to enslavers for every enslaved person emancipated by the state, warned that the loss of enslaved people could leave some colonists destitute, and reasoned that freeing them would not only leave his settlers alone in the harsh Texas environment but would also expose them to the discomfort and nuisance of living amongst formerly enslaved people, who would become vagrants seeking retribution upon their former owners. While he waited for the legislature's verdict of his request, Austin went into a deep depression over the issue and sent his brother, Brown Austin, to further lobby the legislature on his behalf.

In March 1827, the legislature signed Article 13 into law. Despite the law complying with some of his requests, Austin called it "unconstitutional". He contested the law as it freed the children of enslaved people at birth, established a six-month grace period before fully emancipating all enslaved people in the state, and included provisions to improve the conditions of enslaved people and transitioning freedmen. Austin –– who had been so effective in persuading the legislature, however, that the author of Article 13 (before its passage) requested to withdraw it –– helped his colonists evade the law by advising them to legally supplant the word "slave" with the words "workingmen", "family servants", and "laborers", and by working to pass a decree that banned freedmen from Texas and forced emancipated slaves to work for their former slaveowners until the accrued "debt" (e.g. clothing, food), incurred for their own enslavement, was worked off.

In 1828, Austin petitioned the legislature to guarantee that slaveowners immigrating to Texas could legally "free" their slaves before immigrating and contract them into a lifetime term of indentured servitude, thereby avoiding recognizing them as slaves. He lobbied to help his colony elude president Vicente Guerrero's 1829 decree to emancipate enslaved people in the province legally and to bypass the government's effort to prohibit slavery when it passed the Law of April 6, 1830.

In 1829, John Durst, a prominent landowner and politician, wrote about the president's emancipation of enslaved people, "We are ruined forever should this measure be adopted". Stephen F. Austin replied,

"I am the owner of one slave only, an old decrepit woman, not worth much, but in this matter I should feel that my constitutional rights as a Mexican were just as much infringed, as they would be if I had a thousand."

In 1830, Austin wrote that he would oppose Texas joining the United States without guarantees that he should "insist on the perpetual exclusion of slavery from this state [Texas]". In 1833, he wrote:

"Texas must be a slave country. Circumstances and unavoidable necessity compel it. It is the wish of the people there, and it is my duty to do all I can, prudently, in favor of it. I will do so."

In May 1835, Austin's colonists learned that Mexico's tolerance for the evasions of enslavers was drawing to a close with its proposal of new abolition legislation. Alarmed, and with Austin imprisoned in Mexico for pushing for independence, colonists turned against the Mexican government, calling it "oppressive" and a "plundering, robbing, autocratical government" without regard for the security of "life, liberty or property". Resisting the impact a changed slavery policy would have on economic growth, and fearing rumors of Mexico's plan to free the enslaved people and turn them loose upon the colonists, shortly after Austin returned from Mexico, he and his colonists took up arms against the Mexican government. Austin later gained U.S. Government support for his revolution when he wrote to Senator Lewis F. Linn and pleaded that Santa Anna planned to "exterminate" all of the colonists and fill Texas "with Indians and negroes [freed slaves]".

== Relations with Mexico ==
Marble sculpture of Stephen F. Austin (1903) by Elisabet Ney at the Texas State Capitol

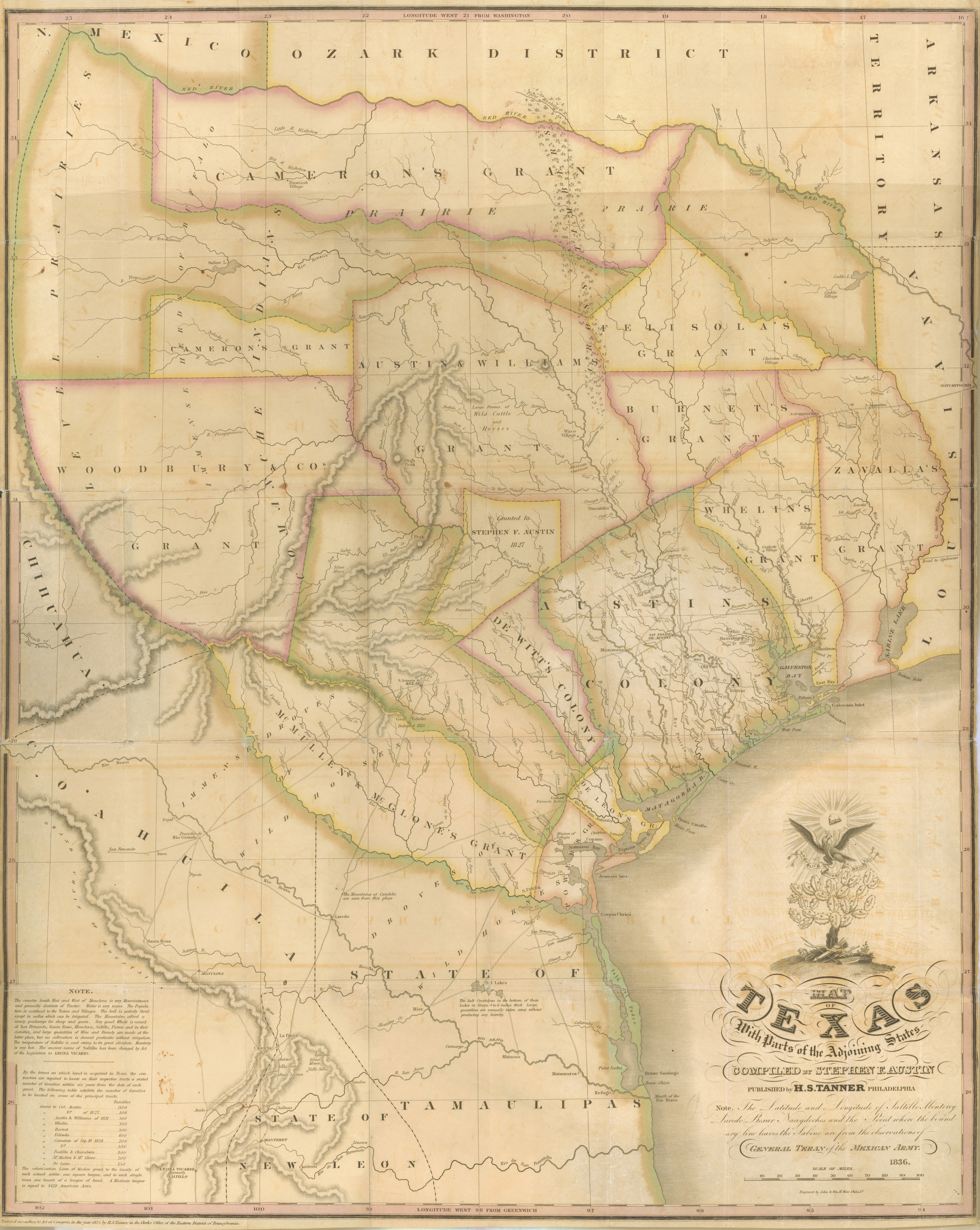
Austin's 1836 map of Texas

Immigration controls and the introduction of tariff laws had done much to dissatisfy the colonists, peaking in the Anahuac Disturbances. Austin became involved in Mexican politics, supporting the upstart Antonio López de Santa Anna. Following the success of Santa Anna, the colonists sought a compensatory reward, proclaimed at the Convention of 1832: resumption of immigration, tariff exemption, separation from Coahuila, and a new state government for Texas. Austin did not support these demands; he considered them ill-timed and tried to moderate them. When they were repeated and extended at the Convention of 1833, Austin traveled to Mexico City on July 18, 1833, and met with Vice President Valentín Gómez Farías. Austin did gain certain significant reforms: the immigration ban was lifted, but a separate state government was not authorized. Statehood in Mexico required a population of 80,000, and Texas had only 30,000.

Believing that he was pushing for Texas independence and suspecting that he was trying to incite insurrection, the Mexican government arrested Austin in January 1834 in Saltillo. He was taken to Mexico City and imprisoned. He was arrested after Mexican officials thought he was encouraging political reform and was supportive of growing calls for Texas self government. Austin was kept in prison for more than a year in Mexico City and different locations without a normal criminal trial. His imprisonment made tensions between Texas settlers and the Mexican government increase, and after he was released in 1835, he was more critical of Mexico’s authority. No charges were filed against him as no court would accept jurisdiction. He was moved from prison to prison. He was released under bond in December 1834 and required to stay in the Federal District. He was entirely freed under the general amnesty in July 1835 and, in August 1835, left Mexico to return to Texas via New Orleans.

== Texas Revolution ==
In his absence, several events propelled the colonists toward confrontation with Santa Anna's centralist government. Austin temporarily commanded the Texian forces during the siege of Béxar from October 12 to December 11, 1835. After learning of the Disturbances at Anahuac and Velasco in the summer of 1835, an enraged Santa Anna made rapid preparations for the Mexican army to sweep Anglo settlers from Texas. War began in October 1835 at Gonzales. The Republic of Texas, created by a new constitution on March 2, 1836, won independence following a string of defeats with the dramatic turnabout victory at the Battle of San Jacinto on April 21, 1836, and the capture of Santa Anna the following morning. He was then imprisoned.

== Republic of Texas ==
In December 1835, Austin, Branch Archer, and William H. Wharton were appointed commissioners to the U.S. by the provisional government of the republic. On June 10, 1836, Austin was in New Orleans, where he received word of Santa Anna's defeat by Sam Houston at the Battle of San Jacinto. Austin returned to Texas to rest at Peach Point in August. On August 4, he announced his candidacy for president of Texas. Austin felt confident he could win the election until two weeks before the election, when on August 20, Houston entered the race. Austin wrote, "Many of the old settlers who are too blind to see or understand their interest will vote for him." Houston carried East Texas, the Red River region, and most of the soldiers' votes. Austin received 587 votes to Sam Houston's 5,119 and Henry Smith's 743 votes. Houston appointed Austin as the first secretary of state of the new republic; however, Austin only served approximately two months before his death.

== Death and estate ==
In December 1836, Austin was in the new capital of Columbia (now known as West Columbia), where he caught a severe cold; his condition worsened. Doctors were called in but could not help him. Austin died of pneumonia at noon on December 27, 1836. He was at the home of George B. McKinstry, near what is now West Columbia, Texas. He was 43. Austin's last words were, "The independence of Texas is recognized! Don't you see it in the papers?..." Upon hearing of Austin's death, Houston ordered an official statement proclaiming: "The Father of Texas is no more; the first pioneer of the wilderness has departed." Originally, Austin was buried at Gulf Prairie Cemetery in Brazoria County, Texas. In 1910, Austin's body was reinterred at the Texas State Cemetery in Austin. Austin never married, nor did he have any children. He bequeathed all his land, titles, and possessions to his married sister, Emily Austin Perry.

== Monuments ==
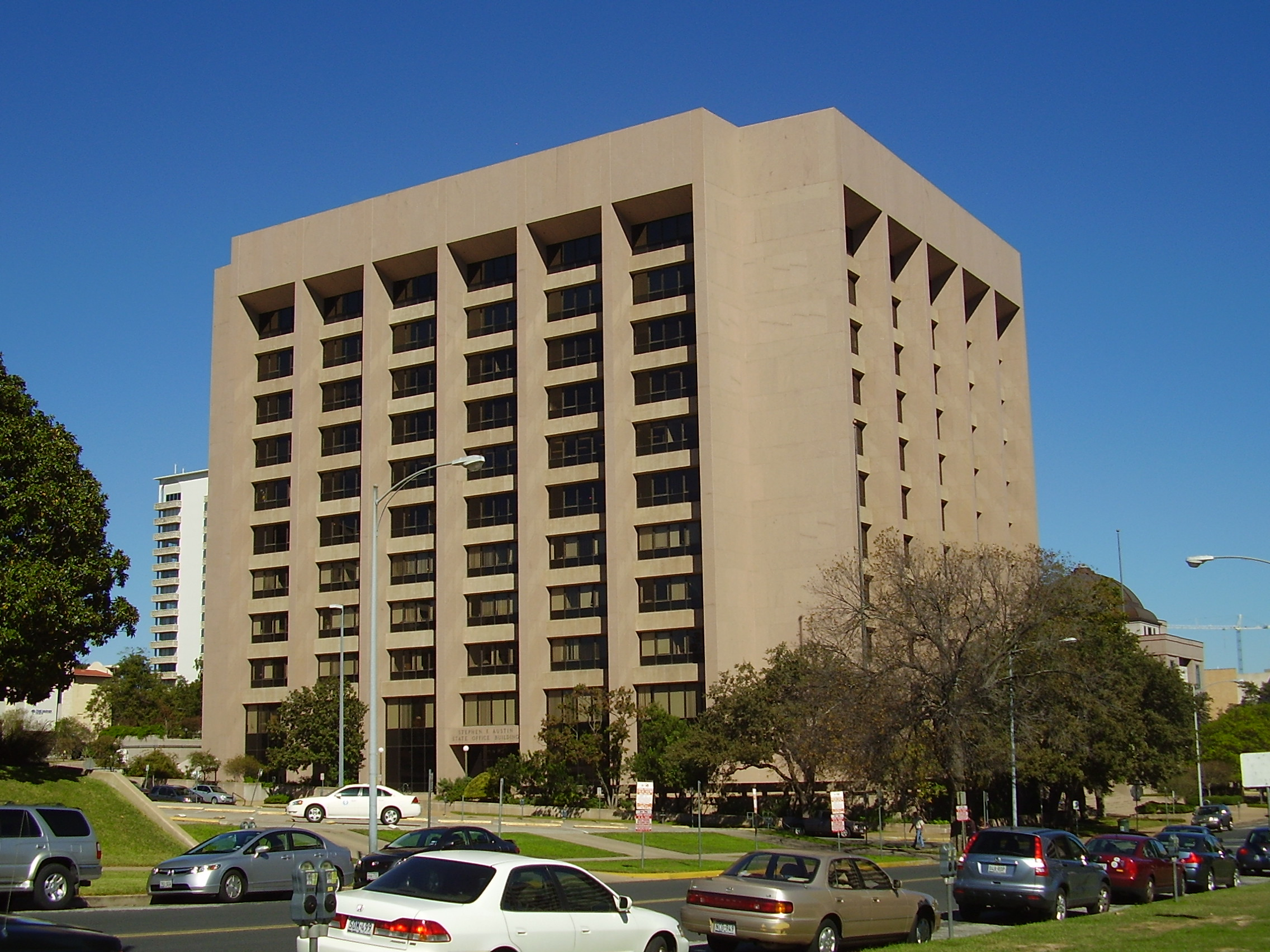
Stephen F. Austin State Office Building

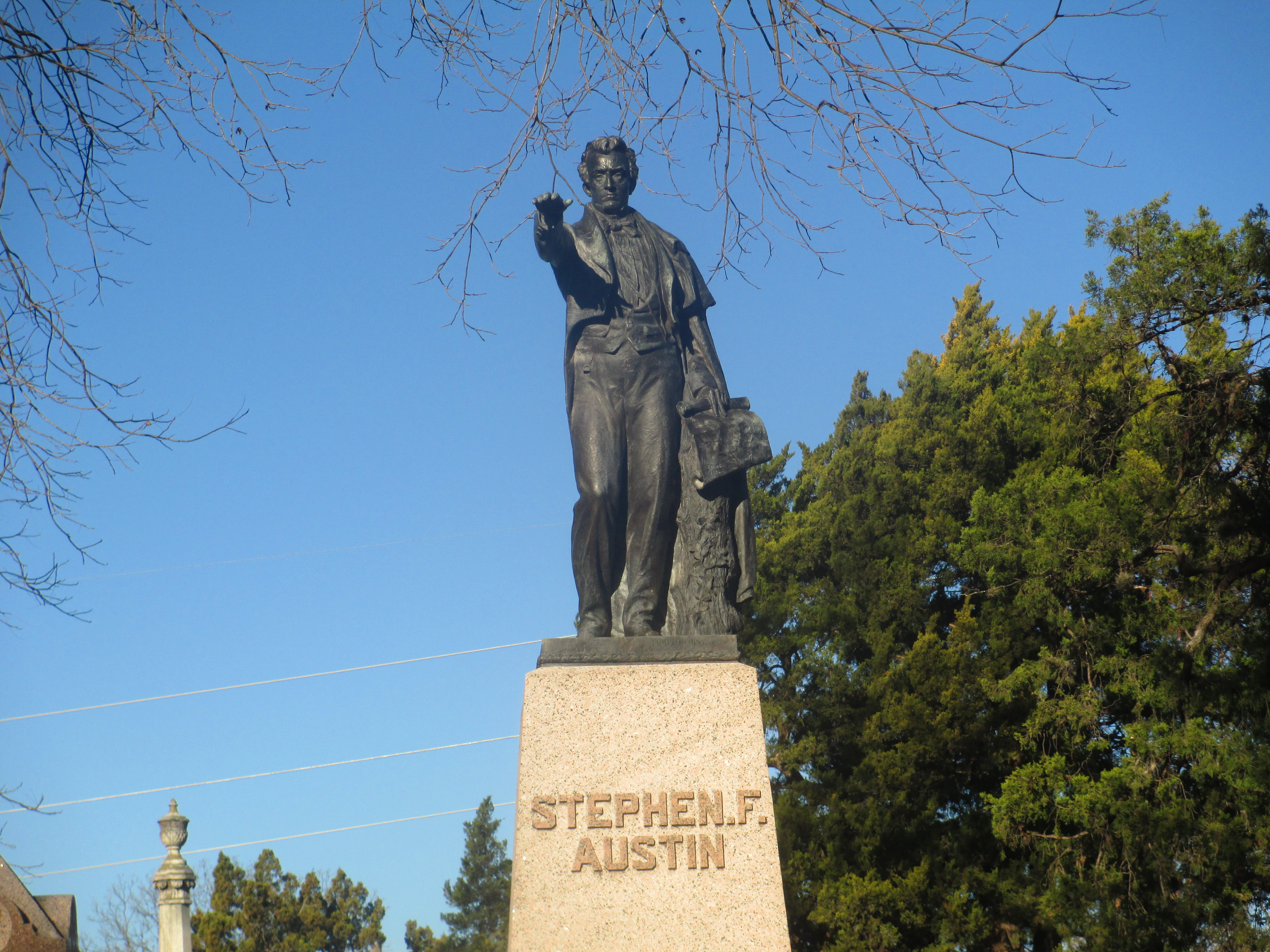
Stephen F. Austin grave monument at Texas State Cemetery in Austin, Texas

- Sherman, Texas, is the home of Austin College.
- Nacogdoches, Texas, is the home of Stephen F. Austin State University.
- Both Austin, Texas, and Austin County, Texas, are named after Stephen F. Austin.
- Angleton, Texas, features a statue of Austin, sponsored by The Stephen F. Austin 500, sculpted by David Adickes, with a base of 12-feet and a total statue height of 72-feet. The base is 2 feet taller than the base of the Sam Houston statue in Huntsville, Texas, but the statue is 7 feet shorter.
- The National Statuary Hall Collection permits each state to select just two statues for display at the Capitol in Washington, D.C. Texas selected Sam Houston and Stephen F. Austin; these statues were sculpted by German immigrant Elisabet Ney.
- Gulf Prairie Cemetery, his original place of burial.
- In 1959, Austin was posthumously inducted into the Hall of Great Westerners at the National Cowboy Hall of Fame in Oklahoma City, Oklahoma.
- In Austinville, Virginia, Austin's birthplace, a monument was erected along the New River near a junction with the New River Trail State Park.
- In Bellville, Texas, the county seat of Austin County, a large bust of Austin by sculptor David Adickes, is located at the intersection of State Highways 36 and 159.
- Potosi, Missouri, a town founded by his father Moses Austin.

== Past family ==
While Stephen F. Austin and his sister Emily have each been the subject of a biography, they are descended from several generations of noteworthy people, including: Moses Austin (father—biography published by Trinity University Press), Abia Brown (grandfather), Joseph Sharp (great-grandfather), Isaac Sharp (great, great-grandfather), Anthony Sharp (great, great, great-grandfather—biography published by Stanford University Press). Accordingly, history records noteworthy social contributions in each generation of Stephen's family dating back to the early seventeenth century. Richard Austin, a native of Titchfield, Hampshire was his paternal emigrant ancestor.

== See also ==
- James Elijah Brown Austin, his brother
- José María Jesús Carbajal, mentored by Austin
- Peach Point Plantation, his residence
- Thomas J. Pilgrim, his friend and Spanish interpreter
- James Bryan, his brother-in-law (first husband to Emily)
- James Franklin Perry, his brother-in-law (second husband to Emily)
- List of Freemasons
- O. P. Q. Letters

== Notes ==
Diplomatic posts
Preceded by post created	Texas Commissioner to the United States; 1835 – 1836 served alongside William H. Wharton and Branch T. Archer	Succeeded by unique post for support of Texas independence

Political offices
Preceded by William Houston Jack	Secretary of state of the Republic of Texas; 1836	Succeeded by J. Pinckney Henderson

Preceded by office created	President of the Convention of 1832; 1832	Succeeded by office abolished
