= Joseph Sharp =

American industrialist

Joseph Sharp (c. 1709–1776) was an early settler of New Jersey, landowner, supporter of education, iron manufacturer and industrialist. His flour mill provided flour to American troops in the War of 1812.

== Influence on education ==
Joseph Sharp authorized the first school in present-day Sussex County to be built on his land as early as 1799. A subsequent school was built in the place of the first school, again, on Sharp's land. Later, in 1823, New Jersey Governor Daniel Haines purchased land from the Sharp family to erect another school.

== Sharpsboro Ironworks ==
In 1768, Joseph Sharp erected a forge and furnace called the "Sharpsboro Iron Works", on the Wallkill River. The village around the Sharp Iron Works became known as Sharpsborough, and then Hamburg. The village was originally named Wallings after an original settler, Joseph Wallings Sr. Due to the expensive nature of the venture and competing forges, Sharp abandoned the property in 1774. Stephen Ford used the Sharp Iron Works to secretly produce cannonballs for the British during the American Revolution. After reclaiming the property, Joseph Sharp Jr. built the stone grist mill in 1808. Sharp's mill provided the flour for the American troops of the War of 1812. The mill continued to serve the needs of the agricultural community of Sussex County.

Present day Hamburg, in Sussex County, was called Sharpsboro until 1795.

== Landowner ==
Sharp was a landowner and, after a group of investors led by William Penn and previously the Duke of York, owned the land where the present day Wallkill Golf Club is located.

== Historical marker ==
In 2004, the Board of Chosen Freeholders and Historic Marker Committee of Sussex County erected an historical marker for Joseph Sharp, located at 41° 8.789' N, 74° 34.638' W. Marker is in Hamburg, New Jersey, in Sussex County, on Gingerbread Castle Road.

== Religion ==
Joseph's father, Isaac Sharp, was a Quaker and there is reference to his being a member of the Society of Friends. Joseph was also Quaker and there is reference to the schoolhouse built on his property having Quaker characteristics. Joseph's grandfather, Anthony Sharp, was the noted Dublin Quaker.

== Family ==
Joseph Sharp married Mary Coleman, and is the father of Margaret Sharp Brown and father-in-law of Abia Brown. Joseph Sharp is the maternal grandfather of Mary Brown Austin, who was the mother of Stephen F. Austin and Emily Austin Perry, and James Elijah Brown Austin, and also the wife of Moses Austin. Joseph Sharp's great-grandchildren include Guy Morrison Bryan, Stephen Samuel Perry, William Joel Bryan, and Moses Austin Bryan. Accordingly, early settlers of Texas are traced back to an early settler of New Jersey, and even further, to the landholder family "Sharp" of Saxony from as far back as the 13th century.

Joseph's father was Isaac Sharp, and his grandfather was Anthony Sharp (prominent merchant of Ireland, a follower of George Fox, and influential in the Quaker migration to the United States, and these Sharps were descendants of the Tetbury clan with wills demonstrating this chain going back to 1500 and the Sharp clan going back before wills to the 13th century in Saxony. Anthony Sharp died in 1707 and is buried in the ancient Friends Burial Ground, Dublin.
