= Austinia, Texas =

Ghost town in Texas, US

Austinia
- Ghost town
- Location in Texas
- Coordinates: 29.438410°N 94.909347°W
- Country: United States
- State: Texas
- County: Galveston

Austinia was a ghost town on the west bank of Galveston Bay in Galveston County, Texas, United States. The site lies near present-day Texas City on Dollar Point, within the Bolivar Peninsula region.

== History ==
Austinia originated in the 1830s as part of efforts by Stephen F. Austin to promote foreign trade through ports along the upper Texas coast. After Austin's death in 1836, his sister Emily Austin Perry inherited the land and platted the townsite.

On May 24, 1838, the Congress of the Republic of Texas granted a charter to the Brazos and Galveston Railroad Company, the first railroad charter in Texas, authorizing construction of a line from Austinia on Galveston Bay to the Brazos River. The company was capitalized at $500,000 and headquartered in Austinia. Emily Perry deeded portions of the land to her son William Joel Bryan and investor George L. Hammeken to finance the project. Hammeken became company president, and Perry’s husband James Franklin Perry served as treasurer.

Despite initial optimism, the railroad was never built. By 1839, the company shifted its focus to canal construction, but that effort also failed. Plans for 40–50 houses and public buildings were abandoned, and the settlement declined rapidly.

Although Austinia never developed into a town, part of the property remained in family hands. From 1865 to 1871, Guy M. Bryan, a nephew of Stephen F. Austin and prominent Texas legislator, operated the 1,200-acre Bay Lake Ranch on the site. The land was later sold to fig growers in the 1920s. Austinia is recognized as a ghost town and commemorated by a Texas Historical Commission marker in Texas City.
