= Stephen Samuel Perry =

American settler (1825–1874)

- Born: 1825; Potosi, Missouri, U.S.
- Died: 1874 (aged 48–49); Brazoria County, Texas, U.S.
- Resting place: Gulf Prairie Cemetery
- Spouse: Sarah McLean Brown (m.1853–1874; death)
- Children: 1
- Parents: James Franklin Perry (father); Emily Austin Perry (mother)

Stephen Samuel Perry (1825–1874) was an American early settler and pioneer of the state of Texas. He had managed the Peach Point Plantation, and he is credited with amassing and preserving significant historical manuscripts related to Texas history.

== Biography ==
=== Family ===
Stephen Samuel Perry was born in 1825 in Potosi, Missouri; the son of James Franklin Perry and Emily Austin Perry, and grandson to Moses Austin and Maria Brown Austin, and nephew of Stephen F. Austin. Stephen is the half-brother of Guy Morrison Bryan, William Joel Bryan and Moses Austin Bryan. Stephen had attended school taught by Thomas J. Pilgrim.

Stephen married Sarah McLean Brown (1830–1888) on April 5, 1853. Sarah was born in Delaware, Ohio and died at Peach Point Plantation. Sarah's parents were H.J.L. and R. P. Brown. Stephen and Sarah had a child named James Franklin Perry on July 29, 1854. James Franklin Perry married Catherine H. Morris (February 20, 1855 - January 25, 1935) and had three children, including a distinct person named "Stephen Samuel Perry" who had also managed Peach Point Plantation.

=== Peach Point Plantation ===
Peach Point Plantation is an official historic landmark of Texas located in Jones Creek. From the 1830s through the American Civil War in 1863, Peach Point served as a working slave plantation growing cotton and sugar cane as the primary cash crops.

As proprietor of Peach Point Plantation, Stephen Samuel Perry was responsible for agricultural planning, together with financial and legal decisions related to the business as well as the homestead and was advised by Mordello Munson. Stephen S. opted to focus on sugar cane growth in the 1850s. In the process of decades of management and communication, Perry. received and cataloged original sources of papers and manuscripts of early Texas history.

With the birth of each of his children, Stephen Samuel Perry planted an oak tree on the property. Peach Point was virtually destroyed in a variety of storms including hurricanes such as in 1909. Though the Hurricane of 1900 and the Grand Isle Hurricane of 1909 destroyed many structures at the Plantation, two of these oak trees (quercus virginiana) still survive in the present era.

== Death and legacy ==
Stephen Samuel Perry died on September 5, 1874, in Brazoria County, Texas. Perry and his wife Sarah are both buried at Gulf Prairie Cemetery, located in Jones Creek, Texas.

=== James F. and Stephen S. Perry Papers ===
The "James F." in the title refers to James Franklin Perry, second husband to Emily Austin Perry and the father of Stephen Samuel Perry. Named in part for Stephen Samuel Perry, whose grandson by exactly the same name donated them, one of the key sets of historical accounts of early Texas history is kept at the Briscoe Center for American History at the University of Texas at Austin. These are called the James F. and Stephen S. Perry Papers, 1785–1942. Stephen Samuel Perry maintained extensive records of communications related to the management of not only the plantation, but also land deeds, growth, and the very settlement of Texas in the 1800s. In fact, the archives and manuscripts presented to the school were so extensive that they are officially measured as 13 feet, 9 inches in width. In fact, virtually all books related to Stephen F. Austin or settlement of Texas footnote or reference the James F. and Stephen S. Perry Papers.

As described by the library catalog, "Papers of Perry and his son Stephen Samuel Perry and their extended families cover significant events in Texas history from the early years of colonization up to the twentieth century. Collection relates to Stephen F. Austin's land holdings, James Franklin Perry's mercantile business and other family-related business enterprises, the establishment and operation of Peach Point Plantation, and the daily concerns of paternalistic slaveholders who found it difficult to make ends meet raising cotton, corn, and sugar; to educate their children where there were no public schools; and to handle chronic health problems. The papers accentuate the contrast between life in various sections of the United States since the Perrys traveled for business, health reasons, and pleasure; attended schools in Ohio, Connecticut, and Virginia; and corresponded with and visited relatives in the northeast as well as Ohio, Iowa, and Missouri."

=== James and Emily Austin Perry Papers ===
Professor of History, Light Townsend Cummins, of Austin College, the official Historian of the State of Texas at the time of this writing, points out that despite her important participation in and contributions to Texas history, there is no collection of letters archived under Emily's name; rather, the collection archived in the 1930s was titled for her husband and son, "the James F. and Stephen S. Perry Papers." Cummins, who has reviewed the papers housed at the Center for American History at the University of Texas at Austin, notes that this collection includes "as much of Emily's letters, documents, and papers as those of her husband and son." Cumins points out that the archive was named in the 1930s, and were they named under archiving standards in 2009, they would very likely instead have been called, "The James and Emily Austin Perry Papers."
