= Durazno Plantation =

Historic house in Texas, United States

- U.S. National Register of Historic Places
- U.S. Historic district
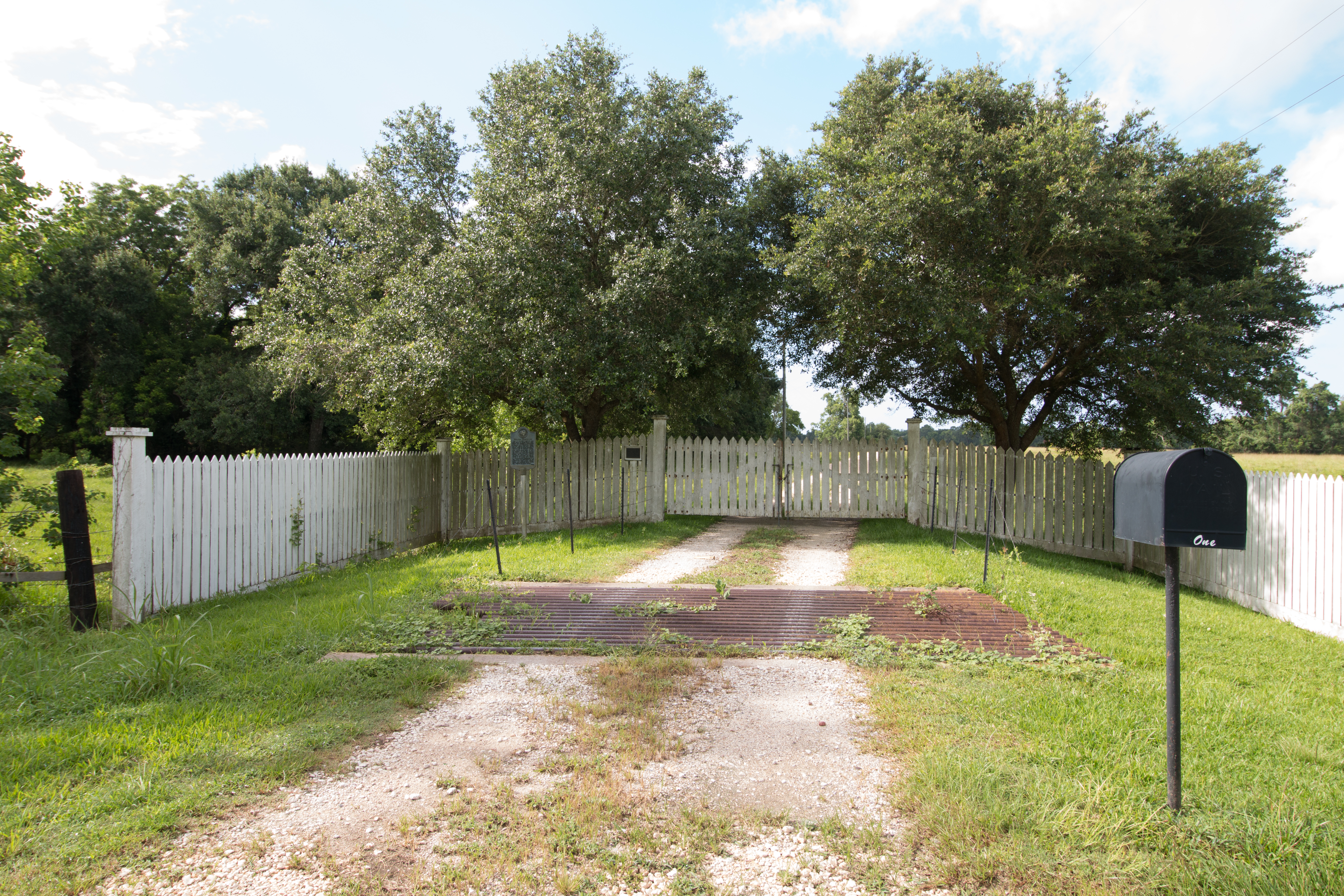
- Durazno Plantation entrance in 2016

- Location within Texas Location within the United States
- Nearest city: Jones Creek, Texas
- Coordinates: 28°57′22″N 95°26′57″W
- Area: 129 acres (52 ha)
- Built: 1828
- Architect: William Joel Bryan
- NRHP reference No.: 80004081
- Added to NRHP: September 2, 1980

The Durazno Plantation is a historic Southern plantation near Jones Creek, Texas.

== Location ==
It is located near Jones Creek in Brazoria County, Texas.

== History ==
In 1840, 500 acres of land was taken from the Peach Point Plantation to create the Durazno Plantation. "Durazno" is Spanish for peach. The new plantation was given to William Joel Bryan (1815–1903) as dowry when he married Lavinia Perry in 1840. The people he enslaved were forced to grow cotton and raise cattle. After his death, it was inherited by his son Samuel Irwin Bryan, who bequeathed half to his daughter Louella Bryan Brutrus, half to his nephew, Samuel Irwin Stratton.

It has been listed on the National Register of Historic Places listings since September 2, 1980.

== See also ==
- National Register of Historic Places listings in Brazoria County, Texas
