= National Register of Historic Places listings in Brazoria County, Texas =

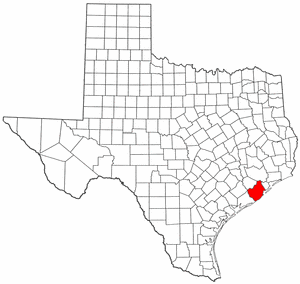
Location of Brazoria County in Texas

This is a list of the National Register of Historic Places listings in Brazoria County, Texas.

This is intended to be a complete list of properties and districts listed on the National Register of Historic Places in Brazoria County, Texas. There are two districts and 10 individual properties listed on the National Register in the county. An additional property has been removed from the register. Among the individually listed properties are one State Historic Site, two State Antiquities Landmarks, and four Recorded Texas Historic Landmarks while one district contains additional Recorded Texas Historic Landmarks.

This National Park Service list is complete through NPS recent listings posted May 1, 2026.

== Current listings ==
The publicly disclosed locations of National Register properties and districts may be seen in a mapping service provided.

	Name on the Register	Image	Date listed	Location	City or town	Description
1	Alvin Gulf, Colorado and Santa Fe Railway Passenger Depot	Alvin Gulf, Colorado and Santa Fe Railway Passenger Depot	March 6, 2019 (#100003467)	200 Depot Centre Blvd. 29°25′29″N 95°14′35″W	Alvin	
2	Brazoria Bridge	Brazoria Bridge	June 14, 1991 (#91000783)	0.9 mi. E of TX 36 on TX 332; 29°03′15″N 95°33′25″W	Brazoria	Recorded Texas Historic Landmark
3	Alden B. Dow Office and Lake Jackson City Hall	Alden B. Dow Office and Lake Jackson City Hall	March 1, 2010 (#10000050)	101 S. Parking Place; 29°02′26″N 95°26′55″W	Lake Jackson	
4	Durazno Plantation	Durazno Plantation	September 2, 1980 (#80004081)	S of Jones Creek off TX 36; 28°57′22″N 95°26′57″W	Jones Creek	
5	East Columbia Historic District	East Columbia Historic District	October 28, 1991 (#91001602)	S. Main St. 29°08′31″N 95°36′54″W	East Columbia	Includes Recorded Texas Historic Landmarks
6	Gazebo for James Richard Marmion	Gazebo for James Richard Marmion	October 22, 2004 (#04001173)	1214 County Rd. 29°02′34″N 95°38′40″W	Sweeny	Sculpture by Dionicio Rodriguez
7	GEN. C. B. COMSTOCK (dredge) Shipwreck Site	GEN. C. B. COMSTOCK (dredge) Shipwreck Site	July 6, 1995 (#94001119)	Address restricted	Surfside Beach	
8	John McCroskey Log House	John McCroskey Log House	August 28, 1975 (#75001958)	2 mi. NE of Cedar Lake on Stringfellow Ranch; 28°56′22″N 95°36′54″W	Cedar Lake	
9	Old Brazoria County Courthouse	Old Brazoria County Courthouse	March 12, 1979 (#79002922)	Public Sq. 29°10′08″N 95°25′52″W	Angleton	State Antiquities Landmark, Recorded Texas Historic Landmark
10	Palapa Table for James Richard Marmion	Palapa Table for James Richard Marmion	October 22, 2004 (#04001172)	1214 County Rd. 29°02′38″N 95°38′51″W	Sweeny	Sculpture by Dionicio Rodriguez
11	Henry Smith Statue	Henry Smith Statue	October 19, 2018 (#100003040)	Intersection of N Brooks & W Smith Sts. 29°02′49″N 95°34′14″W	Brazoria	In honor of Henry Smith (Texas governor) who lived in Brazoria for a while. Recorded Texas Historic Landmark
12	Ammon Underwood House	Ammon Underwood House	June 24, 1976 (#76002011)	505 Main St. 29°08′25″N 95°37′02″W	East Columbia	Recorded Texas Historic Landmark; relocated in 2005 due to river encroachment
13	Varner-Hogg Plantation	Varner-Hogg Plantation	April 9, 1980 (#80004082)	2 mi. NE of West Columbia off FM 2852; 29°09′47″N 95°38′25″W	West Columbia	State Historic Site, State Antiquities Landmark, Recorded Texas Historic Landmark

== Former listings ==
	Name on the Register	Image	Date listed	Date removed	Location	City or town	Description
1	Ellerslie Plantation		December 21, 1978 (#78002898)	August 22, 1979	SE of Brazoria off TX 36	Brazoria	Delisted due to procedural error during nomination.

== See also ==
- National Register of Historic Places listings in Texas
- Recorded Texas Historic Landmarks in Brazoria County
