= Emily Austin Perry =

Sole heir to Stephen F. Austin (1795–1851)

Emily Austin Bryan Perry (June 22, 1795 – 1851) was the sister of Stephen F. Austin and an early settler of Texas. She was an heir to Austin's estate when he died in 1836. She achieved significant political, economic and social status as a woman in Texas at a time when women were often not treated equal to men.

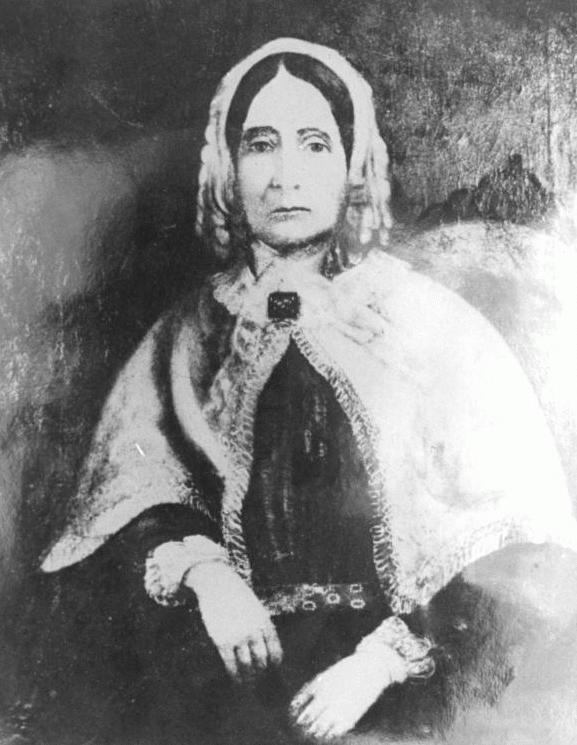
Emily Austin Perry, Courtesy of the Brazoria County Historical Museum. This is a photo of a canvas portrait of Emily Austin Perry. The location of the original canvas is presently uncertain.

== Education ==
Perry was born in Austinville, Virginia. She attended Mrs. Beck's Boarding School in Lexington, Kentucky from October 1804 until December 1808, then two years at the Hermitage Academy located on the Hudson River to further her education.

== First marriage and children ==
Perry married James Bryan (1788–1822) in Potosi, also known as "Mine á Breton" or "Mine au Breton." The two lived with Emily’s parents at their home called Durham Hall, in Missouri, from 1813–1814. In 1815, they moved to Hazel Run, Missouri, and also later to Herculaneum, Missouri. Emily and James Bryan had five children:

- Stephen Austin Bryan was born on July 17, 1814, in Durham Hall, Missouri. He died on August 12, 1814, in Durham Hall, Missouri.
- William Joel Bryan was born on December 14, 1815, in Hazel Run, Saint Genevieve, Missouri. He died on March 13, 1903.
- Moses Austin Bryan was born on September 25, 1817, in Herculaneum, Jefferson County, Missouri. He died on March 16, 1895, in Brenham, Texas.
- Guy Morrison Bryan was born on January 12, 1821, in Herculaneum, Jefferson County, Missouri. He died on June 4, 1901, in Austin, Travis County, Texas.
- Mary Elizabeth Bryan was born on July 5, 1822, in Herculaneum, Jefferson County, Missouri. She died on August 4, 1833.

James Bryan (Emily’s first husband) died on July 16, 1822, in Potosi, Missouri. Perry supported her family by taking in boarders and teaching at a school in Hazel Run, Missouri.

== Second marriage and children ==
On September 23, 1824, Perry married her second husband, James Franklin Perry. Emily and James Franklin Perry had six children:

- Stephen Samuel Perry (Born June 24, 1825, in Potosi, Missouri; died September 5, 1874, in Brazoria, Texas).
- Emily Rosanna Perry (Born September 24, 1826, in Potosi, Missouri; died December 6, 1827, in Potosi, Missouri).
- Eliza Margaret Perry (Born January 3, 1828, in Potosi, Missouri; died January 3, 1862, in Austin, Texas).
- James Elijah Brown Perry (Born May 17, 1830, in Potosi, Missouri; died February 14, 1831, in Chocolate Bayou, Texas).
- Henry Austin Perry (Born November 17, 1831, at Chocolate Bayou, Texas; died September 10, 1853, in Biloxi, Mississippi).
- Cecilia Perry (Born December 10, 1835, at Peach Point Plantation; died June 8, 1836, at Peach Point Plantation).

Of her eleven total children, six would live to adulthood. On June 7, 1831, the family, composed of Emily and James Perry, four Bryan children, and Stephen Perry, began the long move from Potosi, Missouri, to Texas.

== First year in Texas: San Felipe de Austin and Chocolate Bayou ==
Emily and most of her family (including Samuel Stephen and Eliza Margaret) arrived at San Felipe de Austin, Texas, on August 14, 1831. Her son, Moses Austin Bryan, had arrived in Texas some months before his parents, on January 2, 1831. Emily and the younger children remained in San Felipe de Austin for several months, and then the family lived for about one year on the Chocolate Bayou producing sugar and cotton.

== Remaining years in Texas: Peach Point Plantation ==
Perry, her husband, and her children settled in Jones Creek, Texas, in present day Brazoria County, Texas and developed Peach Point Plantation also known as "Peach Point"; she lived at Peach Point until she died in 1851.

== Rutherford B. Hayes ==
Perry interacted with Rutherford B. Hayes during his visit to Peach Point Plantation in 1848. Hayes wrote in a letter that Perry was, "an excellent motherly sort of woman, whose happiness consists in making others happy." Hayes also wrote in a letter to his mother that, "instead of having the care of one family, [Emily] is the nurse, physician, and spiritual adviser of a whole settlement of careless slaves. She feels it is her duty to see to their comfort when sick or hurt." Some historians argue that Perry's relatively/comparatively favorable treatment of slaves can be generalized to other holders of the time period, while others question whether this generalization is reasonable.

Though they may not themselves have known when they met, Perry was also, via shared descent from Anthony Austin and Esther Huggins, a third cousin once removed of U.S. President Rutherford B. Hayes.

== Sole heir to Stephen F. Austin ==
Perry was the sole heir to Stephen Fuller Austin following his death. Half the estate went to her immediately and half the "entire estate reverted to Emily" in 1837 upon the death of Brown Austin's eight-year-old son, who happened to be named Stephen F. Austin, Jr. Everything was bequeathed not in James Perry's name and not to her sons, but to Perry, a woman, in 1836. Transferred by bequest, all of Stephen F. Austin's possessions, property and land became Perry's separate property, and not community property. In fact, Perry was meticulous to ensure the Austin estate proceeds, books, and operations were not commingled, thus maintaining their legal characterization as her separate property, rather than community property with her husband (even though her husband, James F. Perry, was executor of Austin's estate).

== Wealth ==
Accordingly, Perry was one of the largest Texas individual landholders and irrefutably the wealthiest woman in Texas. She was actively involved in management of the Austin estate, including investments and land, actively involved in a time when male signatures were still required on contracts and women could not vote.

== Support of land planning, railroads, and industry ==
Perry was very involved in the urban planning and settling land. For example, she was one of the founders of the San Luis Company, which managed the development of San Luis, including the initial sale of 450 lots, development of streets, building a bridge, and construction of a lighthouse.

Perry raised capital and invested in the first attempt to build a railroad in Texas: The Brazos and Galveston Railroad Company, chartered by the Congress of the Republic of Texas, on May 24, 1838. The rail was initially to go from Galveston Bay to the Brazos River, and later plans were for the rail to go from San Luis Island instead of Galveston Bay. She was the largest shareholder of the first railroad company in Texas. Perry was at the helm of the development and planning of San Luis.

Perry not only owned the league of land which contained Dollar Point, she also managed the development of the town of Austinia, located within that league. Austinia is known in the present day as Texas City.

Perry loaned money to Gail Borden (as in the founder/pioneer of Borden Milk Products) to buy his first herd of cows.

== Support of religion ==
Perry played a key role in founding the first Episcopal Church in Texas. In 1848, she donated to a visitor to Peach Point, Episcopal Bishop George Washington Freeman of Arkansas, in order to help launch the Episcopal Diocese of Texas. In addition, she paid to underwrite Leonidas Polk's trip to Texas from Louisiana. Polk was the Bishop of the Episcopal Diocese of Louisiana and later served as a General in the American Civil War, ultimately having Fort Polk named in his honor. Perry also donated the land on which the Union Church Building was originally built; this one structure served as a prayer center for Methodists, the Episcopalians, and the Presbyterians.

== Support of education ==
Perry paid Thomas J. Pilgrim to teach her children; Pilgrim started the all-boys school, Austin Academy, in 1829, which was the first school in Texas. Austin Academy had about 40 students.

Perry deeded 1,500 acres (6.1 km^{2}) of land for the support and founding of Austin College. In addition, she directed monies owed by the State of Texas to the Austin estate to Austin College. Perry agreed to support her family friend and Austin College Founder Reverend Daniel Baker (who had been Pastor of the Washington, DC Presbyterian church attended by Andrew Jackson and John Quincy Adams); she supported Baker in his pursuit of expanding religious foundations and education in Texas.

== Geographic names ==
Perry's children and their progeny also played important roles in Texas history and the development of the State. The surnames of Emily's first husband, James Bryan, and her second husband, James Perry, are each geographic names in Texas. For example, Bryan, Texas is the location of Texas A&M University; Perry's Landing is located in Brazoria County.

== James and Emily Perry Papers ==
Professor of History, Light Townsend Cummins, of Austin College, the official Historian of the State of Texas at the time of this writing, points out that despite her important participation in and contributions to Texas history, there is no collection of letters archived under Emily's name; rather, the collection archived in the 1930s was titled for her husband and son, "the James F. and Stephen S. Perry Papers." Cummins, who has reviewed the papers housed at the Center for American History at the University of Texas at Austin, notes that this collection includes "as much of Emily's letters, documents, and papers as those of her husband and son." Cummins points out that the archive was named in the 1930s, and were they named under archiving standards in 2009, they would very likely instead have been called, "The James and Emily Austin Perry Papers."

== Death ==
Perry is buried at Gulf Prairie Cemetery at the site of the present day historical marker in her honor, and beside her brother, Stephen F. Austin. (Stephen F. Austin's remains were moved to Austin, Texas in 1910). An obituary at the time reflects that "Funeral services were performed by the Rev. Mr. Phillips, of the Methodist Episcopal church."

== Historical marker ==
In 1986, as part of the Texas Sesquicentennial, an historical marker was commissioned in recognition of Perry's contribution to Texas history.

== Austin-Bryan-Perry family reunion ==
Each year, descendants of the Austin, Bryan, and Perry families from across the country gather in Jones Creek for reunion in celebration of Perry's life and her birthday. The Daughters of the Republic of Texas, Volume 1, states that on her birthday more than 200 met to "rise up and call her blessed", (applying to Perry the language from the poem, Eishes Chayil (אשת חיל), "A Woman of Valor", with which King Solomon concludes the Book of Proverbs). Stephen F. Austin, himself, had no children.

== Name variations ==
Perry is recorded in history by a variety of names which encompass her maiden name, her first marriage name, her second marriage name, a middle initial, and her mother's maiden name. These include:

- Emily Austin
- Emily M. Austin
- E.M. Austin
- Emily Margaret Austin
- Emily Margaret Brown Austin
- Emily Brown Austin
- Emily Margaretta Brown Austin
- Emily M. Bryan
- Emily M. Austin Bryan
- Emily Margaret Bryan
- Emily Margaret Austin Bryan
- Emily A. Bryan
- Emily A. Perry
- Emily M. Bryan Perry
- Emily Margaret Austin Perry
- Emily Austin Bryan
- Emily Austin Perry
- Emily M. Austin Perry
- E. M. Perry
- E. M. P-
- Emily Perry
- Emily M. Perry
- Emily M. B. Austin
- Emily M. B. Perry
- Emily Margaret Perry
- Emily Bryan
- Emily Austin Bryan Perry
- Emily Margaret Austin Perry Bryan
- Emily Margaret Austin Bryan Perry
- Emily Margaret Brown Austin Bryan Perry

In addition to the above, there are still other references to Emily by just her first name, as well as references without use of her given, marital or personal name, i.e. "and wife" or "his wife," "Miss", "Mrs." and "Ms." all of which are not here provided.

== Penmanship style ==
Perry had a unique penmanship style. Her penmanship style from letters and writings were reduced to a single typeset font for word processing purposes. The Emily Austin font has been used in actual published literature.

== Past family ==
Perry and her brother, Stephen F. Austin, themselves descended from several noteworthy people including: Moses Austin (father—biography published by Trinity University Press), Abia Brown (grandfather), Joseph Sharp (great grandfather), Isaac Sharp (great, great grandfather), Anthony Sharp (great, great, great grandfather—biography published by Stanford University Press). Accordingly, history records noteworthy social contribution in each generation of Perry's family dating back to the early 17th century.

Some additional background, Perry's father, Moses was the son of Elias Austin & Eunice Phelps; Elias was the son of Richard Austin & Dorothy Adams; Richard was the son of Anthony Austin & Esther Huggins, Jacob Adams & Anna Allen; Richard Austin & Elizabeth Betsy Austin (born 1610), John Huggins & Bridget Green (gave birth to Esther Huggins), Robert Adams & Eleanor ___, Nicholas Allen & Martha Allen (gave birth to Anna Allen).
