= Mary Brown Austin =

American wife of Moses Austin

Mary Brown Austin (1768–1824) was a moving force in the history of the early settlement of Anglo-Americans in Texas. She was the wife of Moses Austin and mother of Stephen F. Austin. She wrote a letter to Stephen asking him to carry out the dying wish of his father that Stephen follow through with the empresario grants for land settlement in Texas.

== Family ==
Mary Brown was born to Abia Brown and Margaret (nee Sharp) Brown, at Sharpsborough Furnace, New Jersey, on January 1, 1768. She had eight siblings and she lived the longest.

After the death of her mother, Abia asked Benjamin Fuller, the husband of one of Margaret Sharp Brown's sisters, to board Mary Brown and one of her sisters.

Mary Brown Austin was the mother of Stephen F. Austin and Emily Austin Perry, James Elijah Brown Austin, and wife of Moses Austin. Her grandchildren include Guy Morrison Bryan, Stephen Samuel Perry, William Joel Bryan, and Moses Austin Bryan. Her daughter Emily was first married to James Bryan and later to James F. Perry.

== Death ==
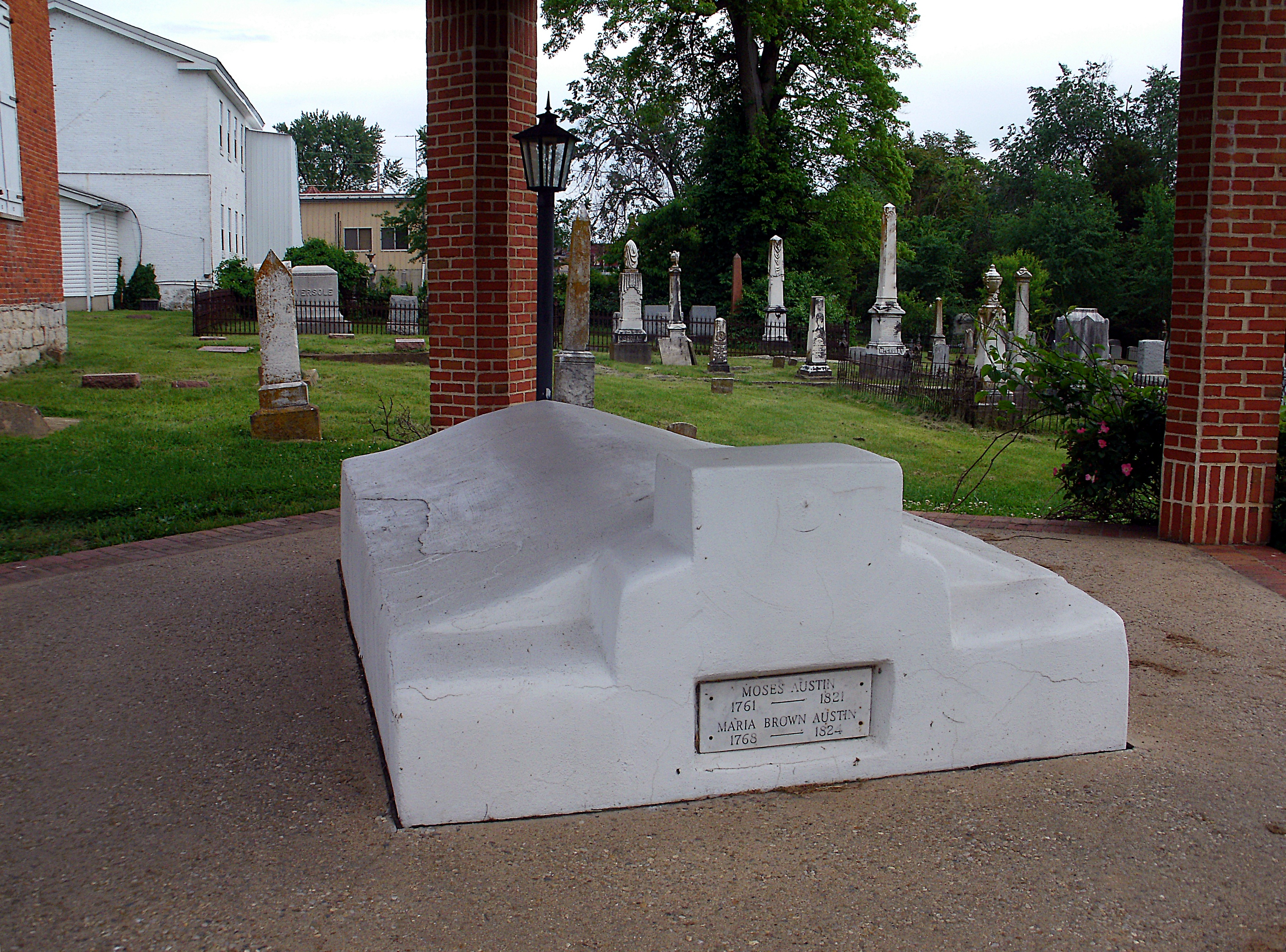
Tomb of Moses and Maria Brown Austin in Potosi, Missouri

Mary is buried in Potosi, Missouri, alongside her husband who founded Potosi.
