= Ammon Underwood House =

Historic house in Texas, United States

- U.S. National Register of Historic Places
- Recorded Texas Historic Landmark
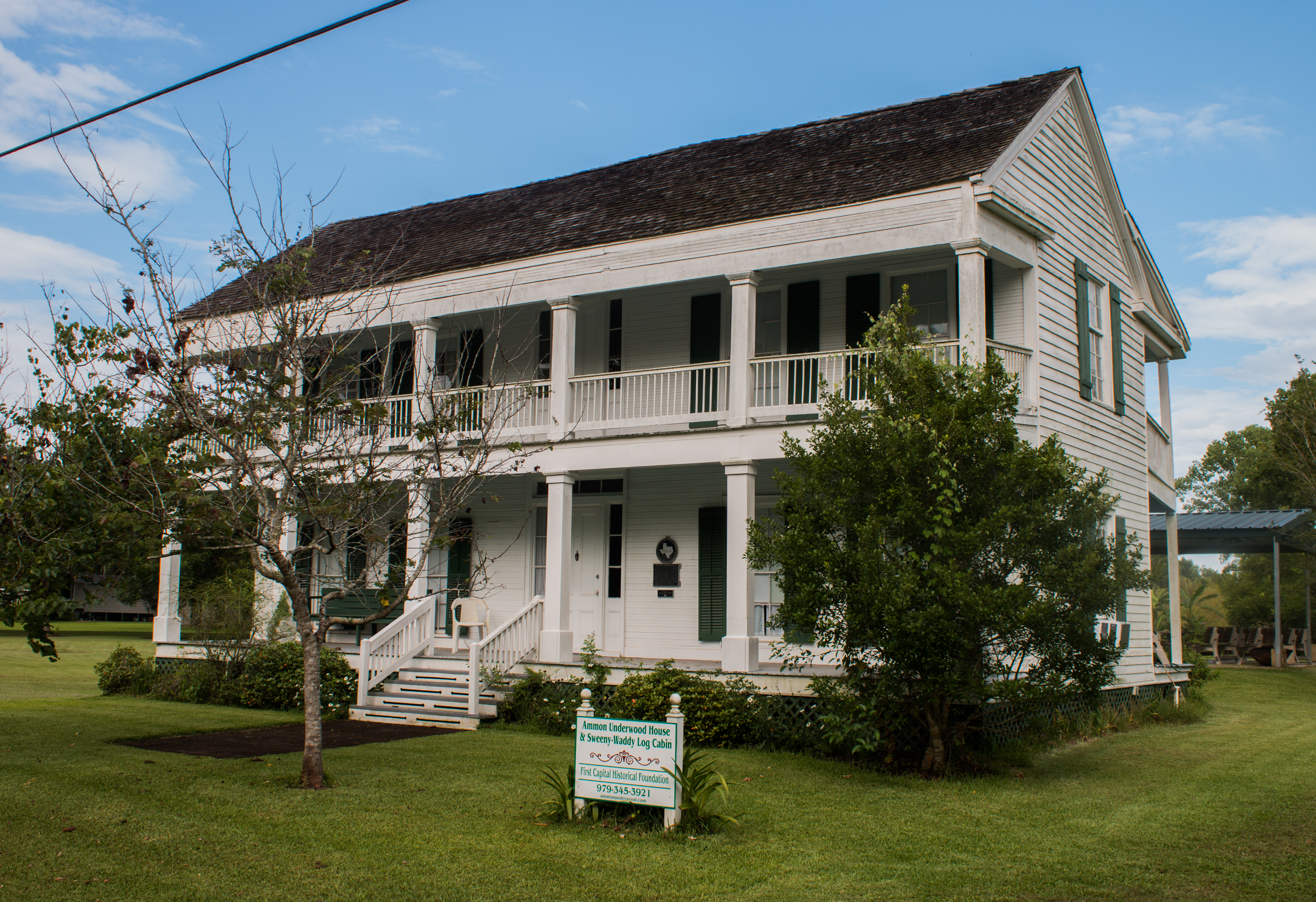
- Ammon Underwood House in 2016

- Location within Texas Location within the United States
- Location: 505 Main St., East Columbia, Texas
- Coordinates: 29°8′25″N 95°37′2″W
- Area: 0.3 acres (0.12 ha)
- Built: 1835
- Architectural style: Greek Revival, Texas Pioneer-Anglo
- NRHP reference No.: 76002011
- RTHL No.: 9612

Significant dates
- Added to NRHP: June 24, 1976
- Designated RTHL: 1970

The Ammon Underwood House is a historic house in East Columbia, Texas, U.S.. It was first built as a log house for Ammon Underwood in 1835. It became a boarding school in 1839, and his family home in 1839, where he lived with his wife Rachel J. Carson. The house was "moved three times before the 1940s." It has been listed on the National Register of Historic Places since June 24, 1976.

== See also ==
- National Register of Historic Places listings in Brazoria County, Texas
- Recorded Texas Historic Landmarks in Brazoria County
