= Perry's Landing =

Perry's Landing, located in on the Brazos River in Jones Creek, Brazoria County, Texas, is named for James Franklin Perry. There is an Historical Marker for James Franklin Perry at the Gulf Prairie Cemetery.

== Postal service and name change ==
A Postmaster for Perry's Landing was established on December 7, 1871. Postal Service to Perry's Landing was discontinued April 20, 1893, but a new postmaster was named and service began again on March 6, 1894 under the name "Perry Landing." The postal office continued to operate until 1929.

Perry's Landing was the original name of Peach Point Plantation. Perry's Landing is located approximately 18 miles south of Angleton, Texas.

== Community development ==
By 1884, Perry's Landing had a church, a school, and a general store. There were then thirty residents. Perry's Landing also had warehouses from which local industry could ship commodities such as sugar, cotton, and molasses. By the start of World War I in 1914, Perry's Landing had more than tripled in population, with over 100 residents. Industry grew there too, including a syrup manufacturer and three general stores.

== Perry's Landing Steam Ferry Company ==
The Perry's Landing Steam Ferry Company assisted locals, visitors and transients to cross of the Brazos River. The ferry could accommodate at least four mules and a wagon filled with supplies. The company was filed with the State of Texas on April 2, 1888.
