= Alden B. Dow Office and Lake Jackson City Hall =

- U.S. National Register of Historic Places
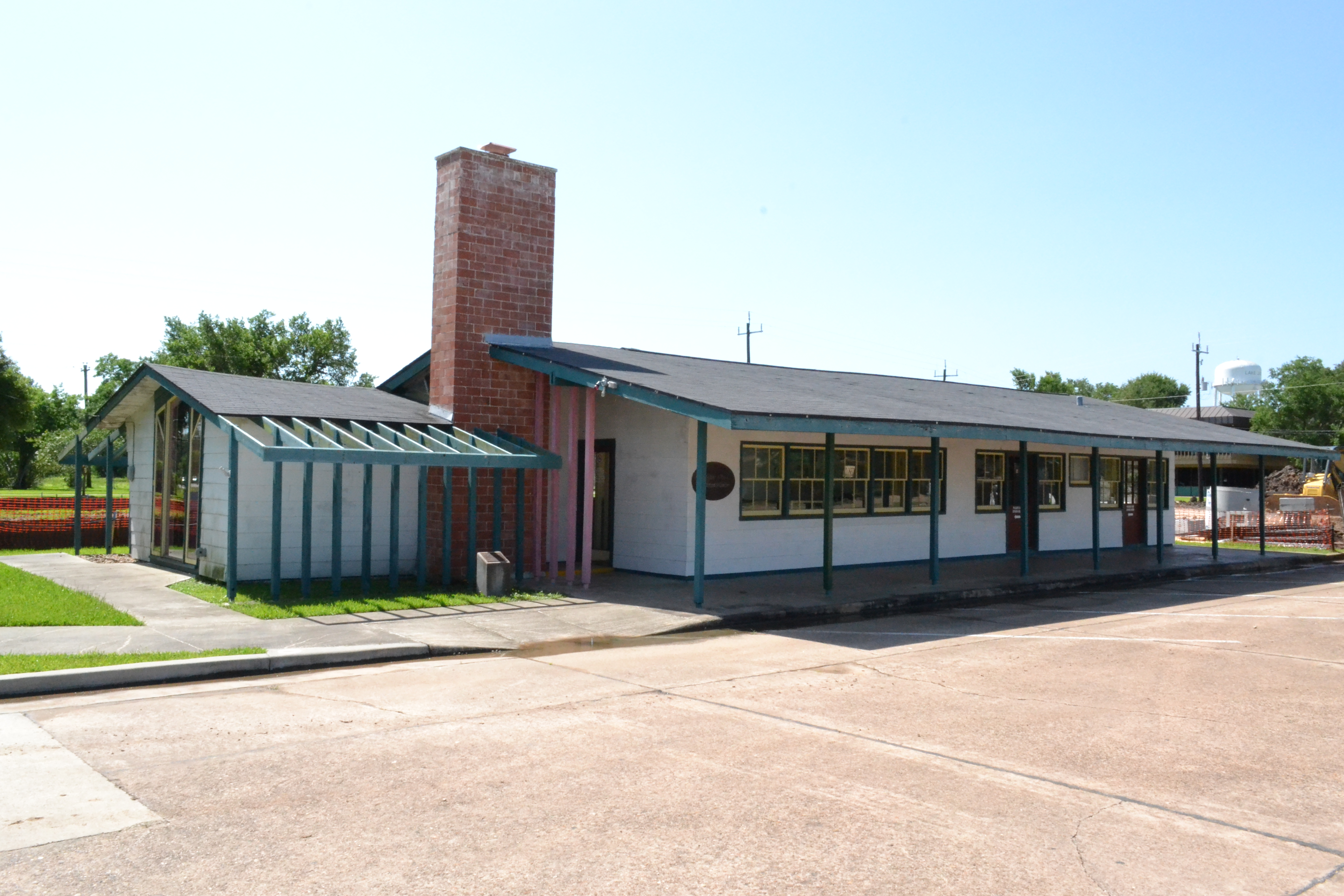
- Dow Office and Lake Jackson City Hall in 2016

- Location within Texas Location within the United States
- Location: 101 S. Parking Pl., Lake Jackson, Texas
- Coordinates: 29°2′29″N 95°26′56″W
- Area: less than one acre
- Built: 1943
- Architect: Alden B. Dow
- Architectural style: Modern Movement
- NRHP reference No.: 10000050
- Added to NRHP: March 1, 2010

The Alden B. Dow Office and Lake Jackson City Hall is a historic, single-story, wood-frame commercial building in Lake Jackson, Texas, located near Freeport. Built in 1943, it was designed by noted Michigan architect Alden B. Dow in Modern Movement architectural style. The structure was designed as part of a company town of Dow Chemical Company and served as Alden Dow's local office during the development of Lake Jackson. Alden Dow, sometimes called the "Father of Lake Jackson" laid out the plan for the city's streets and designed all of the city's initial buildings, plus six models for varied styles of residences. Dow was the son of the Dow Chemical Company's founder, Herbert Henry Dow. In a May 1944 publication issued by Dow Chemical Company, the Alden B. Dow Office and Lake Jackson City Hall were described as follows:

"If anything were ever modern it is that office. Picture windows, blue-gray walls, a brilliant green ceiling, magenta doors and trim—and the rest, yellow. Dow's city-builder in the functional vest tells you that the color scheme of his office is typical of Lake Jackson."

The building was listed on the National Register of Historic Places in 2010.

== See also ==
- National Register of Historic Places listings in Brazoria County, Texas
