= Peach Point Plantation =

Historic site in Brazoria County, Texas

Coordinates: 28.9788°N 95.4719°W

Peach Point Plantation is a historic site located in Jones Creek, Brazoria County, Texas. It was a forced-labor farm and the homestead and domicile of many early Texas settlers, including Emily Austin Perry, James Franklin Perry, William Joel Bryan, Stephen Fuller Austin, and Guy Morrison Bryan. The land was operated as a working forced-labor farm producing cotton and sugar cane from 1832 until 1863.

== Location ==
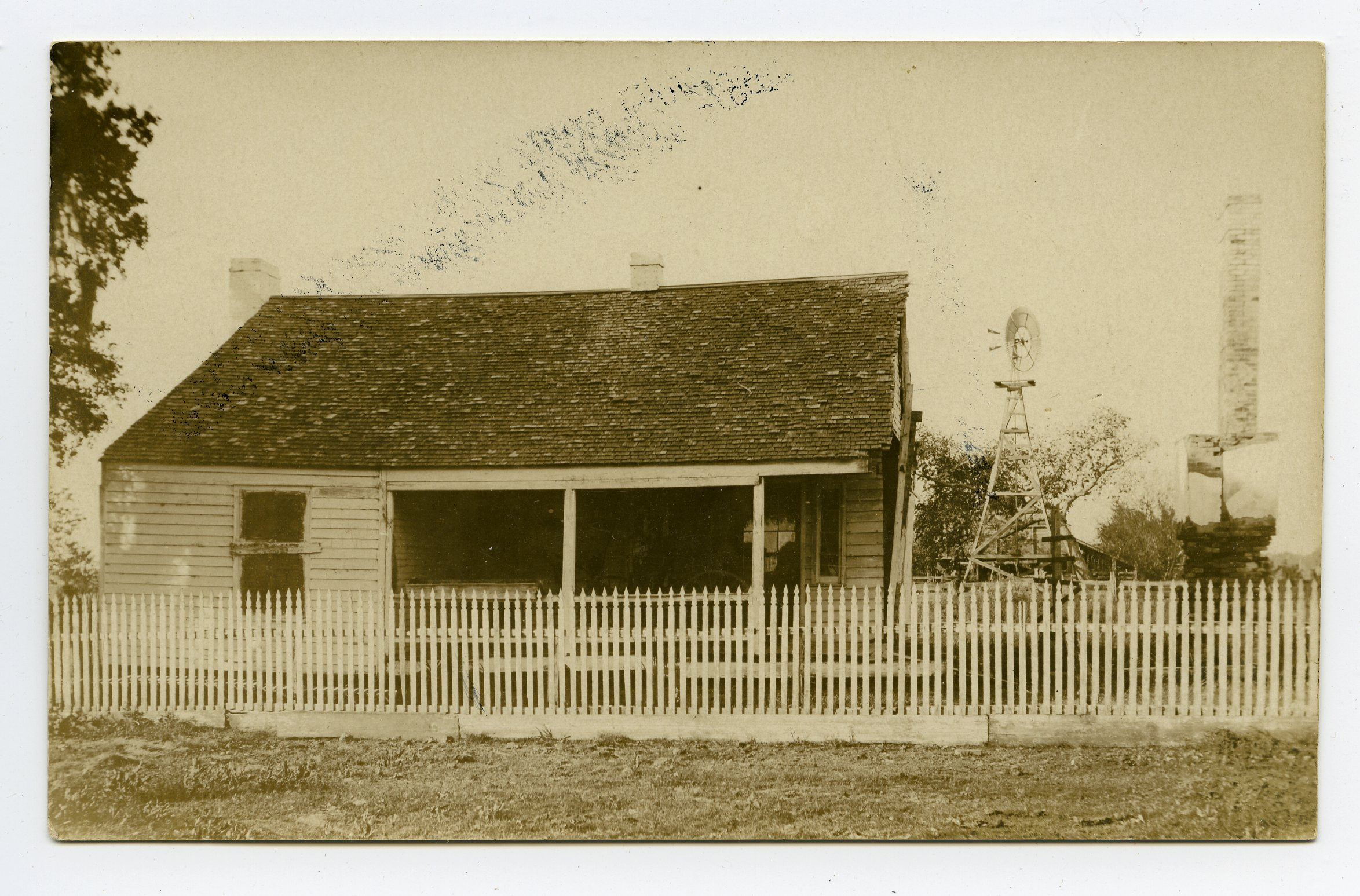
Postcard of partially destroyed structure on Peach Point Plantation (1910)

Peach Point Plantation originally encompassed many square miles. Today Texas historical markers for Emily Margaret Austin Bryan Perry, Stephen F. Austin, every marker found at Gulf Prairie Cemetery are within its former boundaries.

== Name ==
Peach Point Plantation was originally named Perry's Landing after its owner, James F. Perry. The name was changed, however, to Peach Point Plantation for all the wild peaches growing in the vicinity at the time. The name is sometimes shortened to "Peach Point." At a later point it was named Peach Point Wildlife Management Area.

== History ==
The Mexican Government, which owned land, granted it to Stephen F. Austin as an empresario in exchange for taking responsibility for settling the area with others. Austin owned this tract of land by 1830 and sold the property in 1832 to his brother-in-law James Franklin Perry and sister Emily Austin Perry for $300.00.

The Perrys managed Peach Point Plantation with their son Stephen Samuel Perry.

=== Plantation ===
Enslaved people produced the early cash crop of cotton . They also produced farm items such as eggs, pork, or vegetables for personal use, selling any excess to Robert Mills and other local merchants. By 1845, they started growing sugar cane, which became their primary crop by the 1850s.

Except for Austin's former office and bedroom, the main plantation house was destroyed in 1909 during the 1909 Grand Isle hurricane, and by 1948 the rooms needed to be restored. In 1949, the family built a new home a few feet away from the former plantation house.

Perry planted an oak tree on the property at the birth of each of his children. Though the 1900 Galveston hurricane and the Grand Isle Hurricane of 1909 destroyed many structures at the Plantation, two of these trees still survive.

=== Notable visitors ===
Among the notable figures visiting the Austin, Perry, and the Bryan families at Peach Point were Rutherford B. Hayes, Leonidas Polk, Thomas J. Pilgrim, and Gail Borden. Austin was originally buried at the Gulf Prairie Cemetery, also known as Gulph Prairie, near Peach Point. The Old Oakland Plantation historic maker refers to Peach Point Plantation.

== Present-day ==
Direct descendants of the original owners still own parts of the original tract of land. Much of the land, previously called the Peach Point Wildlife Management Area, is now known as the Justin Hurst Wildlife Management Area and it covers approx. 12,000-acres owned by the Texas Parks and Wildlife Department.
