= James Bryan (mining executive) =

American businessman (1789–1822)

James Bryan (1789–1822) was an American mining entrepreneur whose efforts in concert with others brought economic development to Missouri. Bryan operated "Bryan's Mines" on Hazel Run, north of Big River, in SW 1/4 of Sec. 33, T. 37N. 5E. in 1806; this location is also known as "Hazel Run Lead Digging."

Bryan owned significant land in Missouri, including a plantation, and donated land in Missouri to the public for the construction of public buildings there. A transfer of Missouri land to Bryan from his father-in-law, mining entrepreneur Moses Austin, eventually became the subject of the 1885 United States Supreme Court case Bryan v. Kennett, which has been called the Court's ratification of the Louisiana Purchase. Bryan was also a significant land owner in Arkansas, and was recognized in a book published by the Arkansas History Commission.

== Family and Legacy Impact on Development of Texas ==
Paternally, James Bryan began a family which had a unique and dramatic impact on the early Anglo development of Texas. James was the first husband of Emily Margaret Brown Austin, brother-in-law of Stephen F. Austin, son-in-law of Moses Austin, and father to several early Anglo settlers of Texas including William Joel Bryan, Moses Austin Bryan. and Guy Morrison Bryan. The Briscoe Center for American History at the University of Texas deems James Bryan historically significant in that they maintain writings as well as communications that pertain to him under the heading "Bryan, James" such as: "Austin Papers, 1676, 1765-1889" and *Bryan (James) Papers, 1799-1822". Moses Austin sent Bryan a memorandum at or about 1819 and this is found in the collection at the University of Texas.

== Family and Life Cycle ==
James was born October 18, 1789, in Haycock Township, Bucks County, Pennsylvania. He died on July 16, 1822, in Hazel Run, Missouri. Emily and James married on August 31, 1813, at Durham Hall, in Mine au Breton, Washington County, Missouri. The two lived with Emily's parents at their home called Durham Hall, in Missouri, from 1813 to 1814. In 1815, they moved to Hazel Run, Missouri, and also later to Herculaneum, Missouri. Emily and James Bryan had five children:

- Stephen Austin Bryan was born on July 17, 1814, in Durham Hall, Missouri. He died on August 12, 1814, in Durham Hall, Missouri.
- William Joel Bryan was born on December 14, 1815, in Hazel Run, Saint Genevieve, Missouri. He died on March 13, 1903.
- Moses Austin Bryan was born on September 25, 1817, in Herculaneum, Jefferson County, Missouri. He died on March 16, 1895, in Brenham, Texas.
- Guy Morrison Bryan was born on January 12, 1821, in Herculaneum, Jefferson County, Missouri. He died on June 4, 1901, in Austin, Travis County, Texas.
- Mary Elizabeth Bryan was born on July 5, 1822, in Herculaneum, Jefferson County, Missouri. She died on August 4, 1833.

Moses Austin died at Bryan's home in 1821. James Bryan is buried in Hazel Run, Missouri.

Descendants of James Bryan meet each year in Jones Creek, Texas, at the Austin-Bryan-Perry reunion in recognition of the achievement of these three families.

There are some historical unknowns about James Bryan including whether he had a middle name, and the names of his parents and where their parents were from. Accordingly, the Bryan name association with Texas begins with James Bryan.
