= Moses Austin Bryan =

American settler (1817–1895)

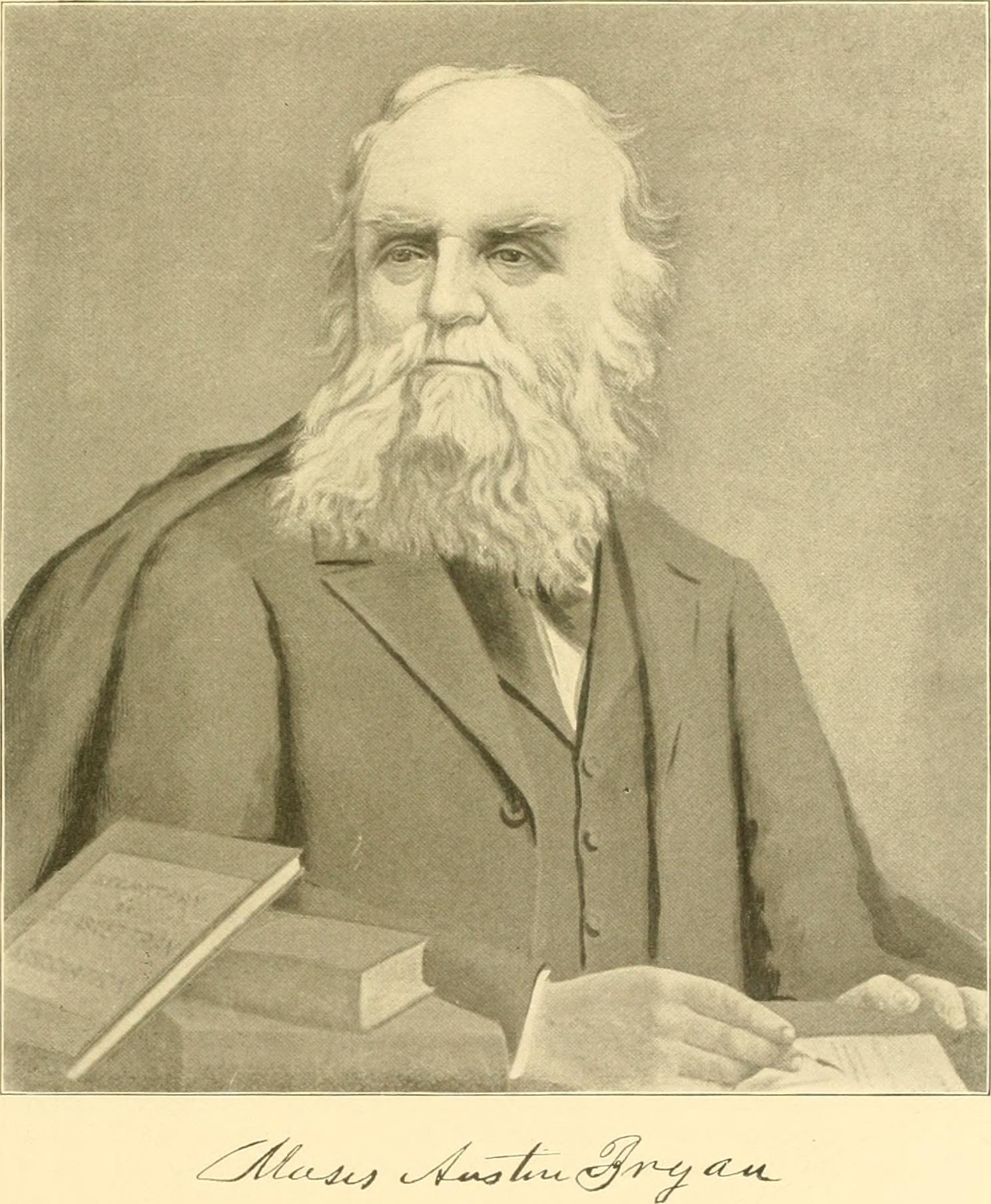
Moses Austin Bryan

Moses Austin Bryan (September 25, 1817 – March 16, 1895) was an early settler of Texas. Moses served as Secretary for his uncle, Stephen F. Austin.

== Family ==
His mother was Emily Austin Perry, and his father was James Bryan. Born in Herculaneum, Missouri, Moses moved to Texas several months before his mother and stepfather. Moses was named for Moses Austin, his grandfather, who had initially obtained permission from Mexico to serve as an empresario to settle Texas. His grandmother is Mary Brown Austin.

His brothers include William Joel Bryan and Guy Morrison Bryan. Stephen Samuel Perry is his half brother.

== Residence ==
Moses did live at Peach Point Plantation.

== Service to Texas ==
Moses fought in the Battle of San Jacinto Moses traveled with Stephen F. Austin to Mexico, where Moses learned and communicated in Spanish. Moses also records an account of the battle and reflects Sam Houston into history. By nature of his communication abilities, Moses was part of the diplomacy between Austin and Mexico.

== Historic marker ==
There is a historic marker for Moses Austin Bryan located in Washington County, Texas at the Independence Cemetery.

== Civil War service ==
Moses served at the rank of Major in the Confederate Army.

== Death ==
Bryan died in 1895 and is buried in the Old Independence Cemetery.
