= Isaac Sharp =

Early New Jersey settler (1681-1735)

Isaac Sharp (1681–1735) was an early New Jersey settler, politician, judge and Colonel of the militia.

== Early life and family ==
Born January 13, 1681, in Dublin, Ireland, Isaac Sharp was the eldest surviving son of Anthony Sharp, a Dublin merchant and Quaker, and his wife Ann Crabb. As part of the Quaker settlement of his father's extensive land holdings in New Jersey, Sharp left Ireland in November 1700, and after an arduous journey of 18 weeks, arrived in Colonial America on April 6, 1701.

Sharp settled in Salem County, New Jersey and first named the area Blessingtown, after Blessington in County Wicklow near the border of Kildare, a place on the road travelled by the Sharps from Roundwood, Queen's County to and from Dublin. The town was subsequently renamed Sharpstown after the settlers.

Isaac Sharp married Margaret Braithwaite of Salem County in 1704, and had children: Anthony (who inherited the Queen's County, Ireland property), Isaac (also a Judge of Salem County Court, appointed by King George II in 1741), Joseph, Mary, Sarah and Rachel (mother of Colonel Sharp Delany). Isaac's son Joseph Sharp was the grandfather of Moses Austin and the great-grandfather of Stephen F. Austin and Emily Austin Perry.

== Career ==
In addition to being a member of the Council of Proprietors, Isaac Sharp served as judge of the Salem County Court (1709–1717) and was a member of the New Jersey General Assembly from 1709 to 1721.

Isaac Sharp was also a Colonel of the militia of West New Jersey for Salem and Cape May.

== Later life ==
Upon his father's death in 1707, Sharp inherited all of Anthony Sharp's land in West New Jersey, and half of his lands in East New Jersey, as well as his land in Queen's County, Ireland, including land in Killinure, which became the site of the Sharp Roundwood Estate. Isaac returned to Ireland in about 1726 and resided on his Queen's County property until his death in 1735.

== Bibliography ==
- Felch, William Farrand (1908). The Connecticut Magazine, Volume 9. Hartford, CT: The Connecticut Magazine Co.
- Garrison, George P. (1907). Southwestern Historical Quarterly, Volume 10. Austin, TX: Texas State Historical Association.
- Greaves, Richard L. (1998). Dublin's merchant-Quaker: Anthony Sharp and the Community of Friends, 1643-1707. Stanford, CA: Stanford University Press. ISBN 978-0-8047-3452-3.
- Myers, Albert Cook (1902). Immigration of the Irish Quakers into Pennsylvania, 1682-1750. Lancaster, PA: Press of the New Era Printing Co.
- "Pennsylvania Magazine of History and Biography, Volume XX". The Historical Society of Pennsylvania. 1896.
- Shourds, Thomas (1876). History and Genealogy of Fenwick's Colony. Bridgeton, NJ: George F. Nixon.
- Tanner, Edwin Platt (1908). The Province of New Jersey 1664-1738. New York: Columbia University.
