= Josiah Hughes Bell =

Texan colonist (1791 - 1838)

Josiah Hughes Bell (August 22, 1791 – May 17, 1838) was an American planter, and a member of Stephen F. Austin's Old Three Hundred colonists. Bell founded East Columbia, and West Columbia in Brazoria County, Texas.

== Early life ==
Bell was born on August 22, 1791, in Chester District, South Carolina to John and Elizabeth (née Hughes) Bell. He served in the Indian Wars and was discharged by 1815, and resided in Missouri. In 1818 he married Kentucky native Mary Eveline McKenzie. The couple's son Thaddeus C. Bell, was the second White child born in Austin's colony.

He later moved to Texas, alongside his friend Stephen F. Austin. On October 6, 1821, at Nacogdoches, Austin granted Bell permission to settle along the Brazos River. Bell's Landing occurred near the modern community of East Columbia, which was originally named Marion.
