= Abia Brown =

Abia Brown (1743 – 1785) served as a Deputy to the Provincial Congress of New Jersey in 1775 (at Trenton) and 1776 (at New Brunswick). As Deputy to the Provincial Congress of New Jersey, Abia Brown represented Sussex County, New Jersey along with Casper Shafer. This position of "Deputy" was then a geographic representative position, and not to be confused with a modern-day bailiff or a law enforcement agent present mainly to keep order.

Abia also served as a justice of the peace for Sussex County in 1772 which at the time was a position of greater stature than present day judicial positions by the same name. Abia was appointed Justice of the Peace by the Governor of New Jersey province. Abia also served on the Counsel of Safety during the Revolutionary War.

== Family and religion ==
Abia was father to Mary Brown Austin, father-in-law to Moses Austin, and maternal grandfather to both Stephen F. Austin and Emily Margaret Brown Austin. On March 12, 1765, Abia married Margaret Sharp (born in Piles Grove, Salem County, in pre-revolution New Jersey). Abia was born in the Township of Nottingham in the County of Burlington, in pre-revolutionary New Jersey, and died in New Jersey.

Abia's father was Preserve Brown Jr., (whose father was Preserve Brown) and his grandmother was Mary French, daughter of Richard French and Mary Sykes. Abia's parents and grandparents were Members of the Society of Friends and attended Quaker meetings at the Meeting House in Chesterfield. Abia's father-in-law was Joseph Sharp, also Quaker, leading to a conclusion that Abia's wife Margaret was also Quaker. These facts lead to an intriguing question about the lapse of direct formal Quaker practice in favor of Episcopal, Anglican, or non-denominational practice among immediate descendants of Maria Brown Austin. One explanation is the influence of Moses Austin, who was not Quaker, and another is the physical remoteness from the Quaker structure and population in Pennsylvania and New Jersey.

== Other name ==
Some sources refer to "Abia Brown" as "Abiah Brown", with an "h" at the end of the first name.
