= Bryan v. Kennett =

- Supreme Court of the United States

Argued December 12, 1884 Decided January 5, 1885
- Full case name: Bryan & Others v. Kennett & Others
- Citations: 113 U.S. 179 (more) 5 S. Ct. 407; 28 L. Ed. 908

Court membership
- Chief Justice Morrison Waite Associate Justices Samuel F. Miller · Stephen J. Field; Joseph P. Bradley · John M. Harlan; William B. Woods · Stanley Matthews; Horace Gray · Samuel Blatchford

Case opinion
- Majority: Harlan, joined by unanimous

Bryan v. Kennett, 113 U.S. 179 (1885), was a United States Supreme Court case in which the Court held that, under the treaty providing for the Louisiana Purchase, the United States would recognize property interests granted by the previous sovereign governments prior to the Purchase, even if the grant had been inchoate or incomplete.

The case involved a disputed title to land in the U.S. state of Missouri, which had previously been under the control of Spain and France before being acquired by the United States. In the late 1700s, the government of Spain had made a possibly incomplete grant of the land to a U.S. citizen, Moses Austin. Spain then lost control of the land to France in 1800, who in turn sold it to the United States. A question later arose as to whether Austin had received sufficient property rights from Spain to allow him to mortgage his land in 1818, or whether necessary rights had somehow passed back to the United States government, making the mortgage invalid and voiding subsequent land transfers that occurred pursuant to Austin's defaulting on the mortgage. Under the Court's holding, the incomplete grant to Austin was valid and sufficient to permit the mortgage.

Bryan v. Kennett is sometimes referenced as the Supreme Court's "ratification" of the Louisiana Purchase. However, the Court had already discussed and confirmed the legality of the Louisiana Purchase much earlier in American Insurance Co. v. Canter, 1 Peters (26 U.S.) 511 (1828).

== Background ==
During the 1790s, Moses Austin, a former dry goods merchant who had married into an affluent iron mining family, had been one of the operators of a lead mine in southwestern Virginia and become known as the "Lead King". However, the business failed and Austin decided to leave the United States in order to avoid imprisonment for debt. He relocated to upper Spanish Louisiana, an area then controlled by Spain (which later became the U.S. state of Missouri), due to rich lead deposits in the region. Austin arranged with the Spanish government to receive a large tract of land in return for his swearing allegiance to the Spanish Crown and agreeing to settle some families in the area.

In 1797, the Spanish governor directed that Austin be placed in possession of land "one league square" (approximately 4,428 acres). Austin subsequently took possession of the land, moved his family onto it and built a house, blacksmith shop, and other improvements. In 1799, Spanish officials conducted a survey of the land and in 1802, the Spanish governor at New Orleans granted Austin the surveyed land. However, in the meantime Spain had returned Louisiana to France by operation of the Third Treaty of San Ildefonso in 1800, although Louisiana remained nominally under Spanish control until 1803, just before France sold it to the United States in the Louisiana Purchase. The land granted to Austin by the Spanish governor was therefore owned by France at the time of the 1802 grant and came under the jurisdiction of the United States in 1803.

Austin founded the Bank of St. Louis and was its principal stockholder. In 1818, he mortgaged his land to the bank for $15,000, but the bank failed in the Panic of 1819, causing Austin to lose his entire fortune and resulting in judgments being entered against him for approximately $14,500. Austin's land was subsequently seized and sold via sheriff's sale to pay his creditors. Following the sheriff's sale, Austin's land changed hands several more times and ended up in the possession of John Deane by 1835. However, Austin, perhaps in an effort to protect some of his assets, had also conveyed the land himself in 1820 to his son-in-law James Bryan and other grantees. Austin died in 1821, and Bryan in 1822.

In 1835, Deane brought a quiet title action in equity in Missouri against the heirs of James Bryan, who by then were living in Texas and failed to appear. Deane was awarded the right, title and interest to the land. Deane and his successors in title continued to occupy the land.

Almost 40 years later, on February 14, 1874, an Act of Congress was approved stating that "the United States hereby release whatever title they have" regarding Austin's former land (now located in Washington County, Missouri) "to the heirs, legal representatives, or assigns of said Moses Austin, according to their respective interests therein, provided however that this act shall not affect nor impair the title which any settler or other person may have acquired adverse to the title of said Moses Austin to any portion of said land." Bryan's heirs now brought an action for ejectment of Deane's successors in title, alleging (among other things) that Austin had not received complete title to his land from the Spanish government and thus he could not have mortgaged the land, which reverted to the possession of the United States and then passed to Bryan's heirs by operation of the Act of Congress.

Deane's successors in title, who were currently in possession of the land, contended that they and those from whom they claimed the land had been in "open, continuous adverse possession" of the disputed land for more than thirty years prior to the start of the current action, and had paid taxes due on the land; the plaintiffs and those from whom they claimed had not been in possession for any period of time exceeding thirty years or paid taxes. They further contended that equitable title came from the United States starting in 1803, that the United States had made no attempt to claim the land itself, and that the previous holding in the 1836 equity suit by John Deane estopped the plaintiffs from now trying to claim the land.

== Opinion of the Court ==
In an opinion by Justice John M. Harlan, the Supreme Court held that Spain's grant to Austin, even if incomplete, was recognized by the United States, thus supporting the claim of Deane's successors in title, who took possession of the land due to Austin's mortgage and subsequent default. In so holding, the Court reaffirmed its position, as set forth in previous cases, that "in that treaty by which Louisiana was acquired, the United States stipulated that the inhabitants of the ceded territory should be protected in the free enjoyment of their property; that the term 'property,' as applied to lands comprehends every species of title, inchoate or complete, and embraces rights which lie in contract, executory as well as executed, and that in this respect the relation of the inhabitants to their government was not changed, the new government taking the place of that which had passed away."

The Court further clarified that the United States government intended to broadly recognize the claims of property owners to property they were granted or otherwise had a presumed right based on the actions of Spain or France prior to the Louisiana Purchase, without requiring that the property owner also have taken all the necessary steps to legally complete the grant. The Court noted that at the time of the Purchase, there were very few "complete grants", that "nineteen-twentieths" of the grants were incomplete and that "[m]ost of the inhabitants were too poor to defray the expenses attending the completion of their titles, but they had faith in their government" that the title would be recognized. In making this ruling on the property issue, the Court cited its previous opinions in Strother v. Lucas, 31 U.S. 763 (1832), Soulard v. United States, 29 U.S. 511 (1830), and Landes v. Brant, 51 U.S. 348 (1850) in support. The Court also noted that the Act of Congress was stated to also apply to "legal representatives or assigns" of Austin and not just to his heirs.

The Court also held that the plaintiffs were estopped from asserting in the current "collateral proceeding" any interest in the property by the 1836 decision on Deane's bill of equity, because the court making that decision had jurisdiction, the decision was conclusive, and had not been reversed or modified on appeal, or otherwise set aside or annulled.

The Court concluded its opinion by stating that "the sole object of [the Act of Congress] ... was to assure those who thus acquired possession, whether by contract or by operation of law, that they would not be disturbed by any assertion of claim upon the part of the United States. It originated with the representatives in Congress from Missouri, whose avowed purpose was to protect the interests of their immediate constituents. The necessity of this act arose from a then recent opinion of the Commissioner of the General Land Office that the legal title to the land within the Austin claim was still in the United States. In order to quiet the fears of those 'who have been in possession for half a century, claiming the land adversely against everybody, as well as the United States,' the act of 1874 was passed. It had no other object."

== See also ==
- List of United States Supreme Court cases, volume 113
