= Gulf Prairie Cemetery =

Cemetery in Jones Creek

- Interactive map of Gulf Prairie Cemetery

Details
- Established: 1829
- Coordinates: 28.9768°N 95.4736°W
- Type: Private
- Find a Grave: Gulf Prairie Cemetery

Gulf Prairie Cemetery (also known as Gulph Prairie Cemetery, Gulf Prairie Presbyterian Cemetery, and Peach Point Cemetery) is located in Jones Creek, Texas, United States, off State Highway 36 and County Road 304 and was the original resting place of Stephen F. Austin.

== History ==
The cemetery was established as part of the Peach Point Plantation and accordingly, some refer to the cemetery as "Peach Point Cemetery." According to the historical marker placed at the Cemetery, the Cemetery was established in 1829.

One example is the account of Austin's removal. Stephen F. Austin's remains were originally located in this cemetery and were later moved to Austin, Texas in October 1910; the ceremonies and details related to this transfer, are recorded in a book by Guy Morrisoncomp Bryan. The Tomb of Stephen F. Austin is located in Gulf Prairie Cemetery.

Other notable figures in Texas history who are buried there include Emily Austin Perry, William Joel Bryan, Henry William Munson, Eliza M. Perry, descendants of James Franklin Perry and Emily Austin Perry, as well as people from the local area since 1829.

While the cemetery has many historical sites within its grounds, in June 2010, Gulf Prairie Cemetery was, itself, awarded an historical marker by the Texas Historical Society. The commemorative ceremony included a keynote speech by Marie Beth Jones, author of the book, "Peach Point Plantation: the First 150 Years" (1982).
