= Anthony Sharp (Quaker) =

Irish businessman (1643–1707)

Anthony Sharp (1643–1707) was a Dublin Quaker and wool merchant.

== Early life ==
Anthony Sharp, the son of Thomas Sharp, was born in Tetbury, Gloucestershire, England in January 1643.

== Religion and business ==
In 1665, impressed by the ministry of William Dewsbury at a meeting in Warwick prison, he joined the Religious Society of Friends, also known as the Quakers. In the summer or early fall of 1669, due to persecution of his Quaker religious beliefs, he fled from Gloucestershire and moved to Dublin and engaged in the woollen trade, in which he was highly successful. By 1680, he employed about 500 workers in the trade and in 1688, the weavers’ guild elected him master.

Anthony Sharp was active in the Dublin Quaker Community. In 1683, he and some other Friends of Dublin were thrown into prison because they continued to attend their religious meetings, contrary to the orders of government which prohibited the public meetings of religious dissenters.

== Land rights ==
Anthony Sharp was one of the original shareholders of West Jersey in 1677. Subsequently, when William Penn purchased land in East Jersey, Sharp also became an owner of property there as well. Not wishing to emigrate himself due to his successful woollen business, Sharp remained in Dublin. Anthony Sharp financed the Quaker colony established in the Province of New Jersey in 1681.

Among those appointed to found the colony was Anthony's nephew, Thomas Sharp, with whom he corresponded on both business and personal matters.

In his will, Anthony Sharp bequeathed to his eldest son, Isaac Sharp, his land in West Jersey, and half of his lands in East Jersey, as well as his land in Queen's County, Ireland, including land in Killinure, which became the site of the Sharp Roundwood Estate.

== Death and family ==
Anthony Sharp died on 13 January 1707, and was buried in the ancient Friends' burying-ground adjacent to St. Stephen's Green in the city of Dublin. He was survived by three sons, Isaac, Joseph and Daniel, and one daughter, Rachel Sharp. Anthony Sharp's father (born about 1603 in Tetbury, Gloucester, England) married Anthony's mother, Elizabeth Hookham on 27 Nov 1628 in Gloucester. Elizabeth Hookham was born about 1607 in Gloucester. They had 7 children William, Elizabeth, Elizabeth, Anthony, Isaac, Anis, and Thomas.

== Biography published ==
Stanford University Press published a biography of Anthony Sharp by Richard L. Greaves titled, Dublin's Merchant-Quaker: Anthony Sharp and the Community of Friends, 1643–1707.

== Bibliography ==
- Clark, Peter; Raymond Gillespie (2001). Two Capitals: London and Dublin, 1500–1840. Oxford: Oxford University Press. ISBN 978-0-19-726247-4.
- Clement, John (1877). Sketches of the first emigrant settlers in Newton Township, Old Gloucester County, West New Jersey. Camden: Sinnickson Chew
- Greaves, Richard L. (1998). Dublin's merchant-Quaker: Anthony Sharp and the Community of Friends, 1643–1707. Stanford, CA: Stanford University Press. ISBN 978-0-8047-3452-3.
- Grubb, Isabel (1927). Quakers in Ireland, 1654–1900. London: The Swarthmore Press. ISBN 978-0-19-820635-4.
- Hatton, Helen Elizabeth (1993). The Largest Amount of Good: Quaker Relief in Ireland, 1654–1921. Montreal: McGill-Queen's Press. ISBN 0-7735-0959-3.
- Hill, Jacqueline R. (1997). From Patriots to Unionists. Dublin Civic Politics and Irish Protestant Patriotism, 1660–1840. Oxford: Oxford University Press. ISBN 0-19-820635-6.
- Leadbeater, Mary (1823). Biographical Notices of Members of the Society of Friends who were Resident in Ireland. London: Harvey and Darton.
- Shourds, Thomas (1876). History and Genealogy of Fenwick's Colony. Bridgeton, NJ: George F. Nixon.
- West Jersey Proprietors (1964). Burlington, New Jersey: Revell Press
