= William Joel Bryan =

Texas soldier and land owner (1815–1903)

- Born: December 14, 1815; Sainte Genevieve County, Missouri Territory
- Died: March 3, 1903 (aged 87)
- Occupation: Planter
- Spouse: Lavinia Perry
- Parent(s): James Bryan; Emily Austin Perry
- Relatives: Moses Austin Bryan (brother); Guy Morrison Bryan (brother); Stephen Samuel Perry (half-brother); Stephen F. Austin (uncle); Moses Austin (maternal grandfather); Mary Brown Austin (maternal grandmother)

William Joel Bryan (December 14, 1815 – March 3, 1903) was a Texas soldier and planter.

== Biography ==
=== Early life ===
William Joel Bryan was born on December 14, 1815, at Hazel Run in Sainte Genevieve County, Missouri. His father was James Bryan and his mother, Emily Austin Perry. He was the grandson of Moses Austin and Mary Brown Austin. Stephen F. Austin was his uncle. He had two brothers, Moses Austin Bryan and Guy Morrison Bryan, and a half-brother, Stephen Samuel Perry.

He attended school in Potosi, Missouri, until 1830. In 1831, his mother (Emily) and stepfather, James Franklin Perry, followed his uncle, Stephen F. Austin, to Texas. They settled in the eastern part of Brazoria County, Texas. In 1832, the family moved to the Peach Point Plantation in Jones Creek, Texas, where Bryan was instructed by a governess and his parents together took care of the plantation, cattle and other such property of Bryan's uncle. The estate of Stephen F. Austin went in whole to Emily Austin Perry and remained her separate property until she died in 1851.

=== Career ===
Shortly after Texas declared its independence from Mexico in 1835, Bryan took his part in the siege of Bexar at his uncle's side among the Brazoria County Volunteers. He also served with Sam Houston in the retreat of the army across Texas. However, he became ill with the measles shortly before the Battle of San Jacinto.

From 1836 to 1839, he served in a managerial capacity at the Peach Point Plantation. Upon getting married, he became the owner of the Duranzo Plantation in Jones Creek. During the American Civil War of 1861–1865, he fed Confederate troops stationed at the mouth of the Brazos at his own expense.

Shortly after the war, in 1865, he granted the Houston & Texas Central Railroad a right-of-way through his land in Brazos County. A projected townsite, Bryan, Texas, was named in his honor. He gave the town financial assistance and helped to establish its bank.

He was a member of the Texas Veteran's Association.

=== Personal life ===
He married Lavinia Perry, his stepfather's niece, in April 1840. The Duranzo Plantation, an extension of Peach Point Plantation, was given to them as dowry. The couple had seven children, four of whom served in the Confederate States Army during the Civil War.

=== Death ===
He died on March 3, 1903.

== Legacy ==
The Brazos County Historical Commission erected an Historical Marker for William Joel Bryan.
