= East Columbia, Texas =

Census-designated place in Brazoria County, Texas, United States

- Census-designated place
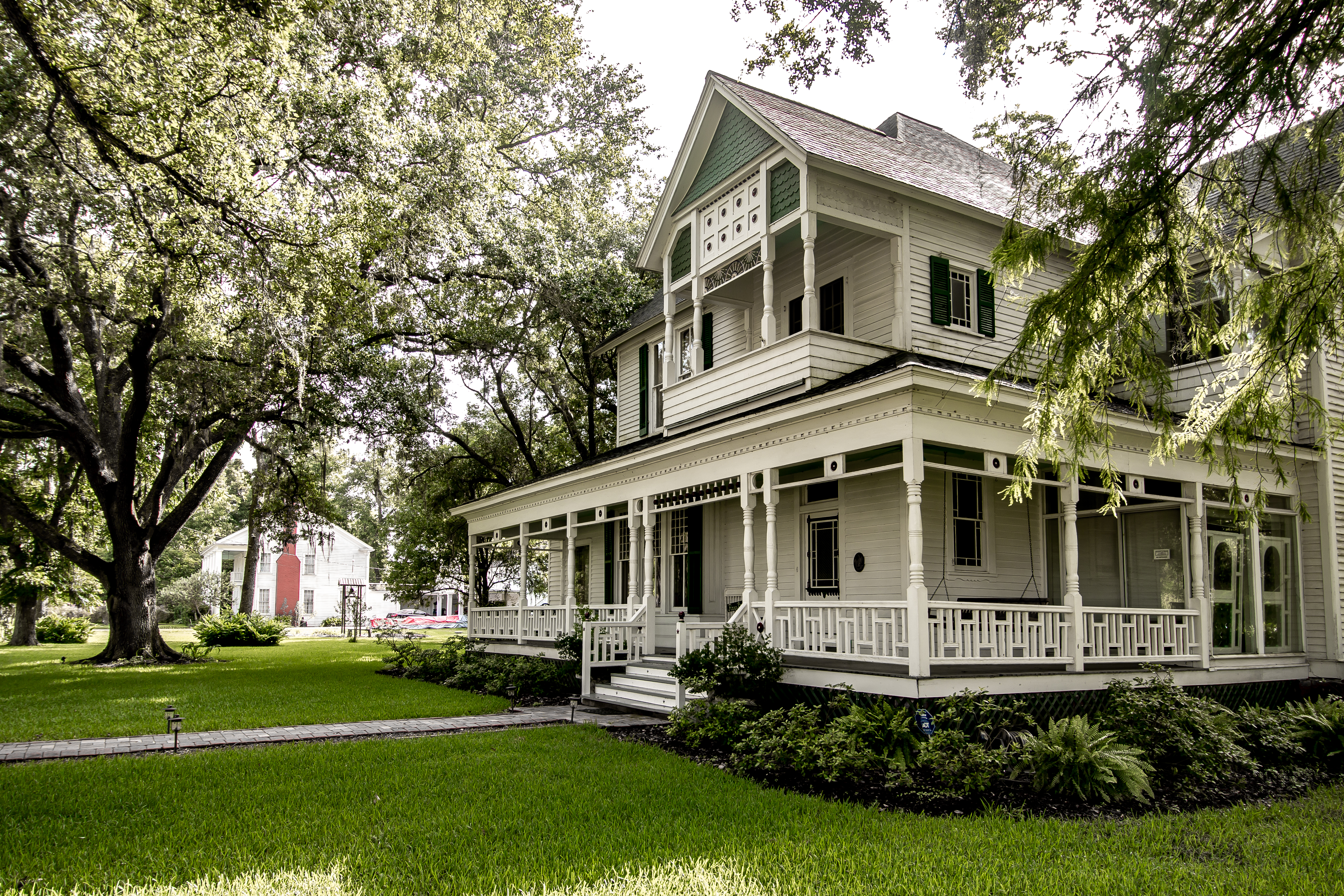
- Aycock-Crews House in East Columbia

- Location within the state of Texas East Columbia (the United States)
- Coordinates: 29°08′29″N 95°36′57″W
- Country: United States
- State: Texas
- County: Brazoria

Population (2020)
  - Total: 128
- Time zone: UTC-6 (Central (CST))
  - Summer (DST): UTC-5 (CDT)

East Columbia is a census designated place (CDP) in Brazoria County, Texas, United States. As of the 2020 census, East Columbia had a population of 128.

== Description ==
The CDP is located nine miles west of Angleton. It was one of the most important inland ports in Texas. The river port became a vital component in the plantation-based economy that developed along the Brazos River in the 19th century.

== History ==
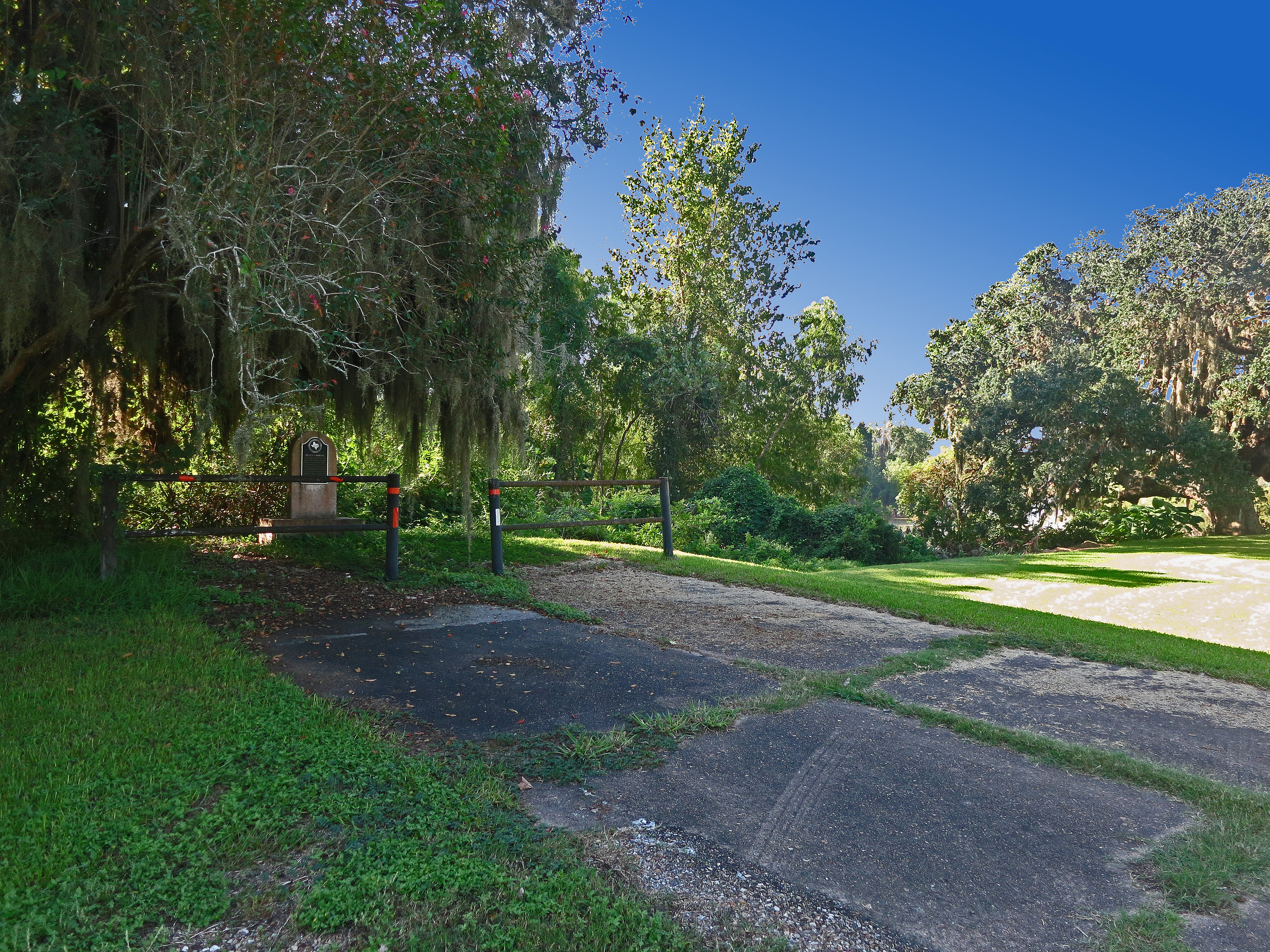
This is the location of Bell's Landing on the Brazos River, where East Columbia was founded

The community was founded in 1824 by Josiah Hughes Bell. A native of South Carolina, Bell came to Texas with Stephen F. Austin's Old 300 colony in 1821. Bell built a landing of log-lines docks and timbered stops on the Brazos River, just below Varner's Creek. Bell laid out the town and called it Marion. Bell sold the townsite to Walter C. White in 1827. By the mid-1800s, the town had a population of 800. The arrival of the railroad in the area led to the decline of steamboat traffic, which had an adverse effect on the town's fortunes. Storms in 1900, 1909, and 1913 were destructive to the community. When oil was discovered in West Columbia in 1918, merchants abandoned East Columbia. By the 1970s, the town's post office had already closed and its population had decreased substantially.

== Demographics ==
Historical population
Census	Pop.	Note	%±
2020	128		—
U.S. Decennial Census; 1850–1900 1910; 1920 1930 1940; 1950 1960 1970; 1980 1990 2000; 2010 2020

East Columbia first appeared as a census designated place in the 2020 U.S. census.

=== 2020 Census ===
East Columbia CDP, Texas – Racial and ethnic composition Note: the US Census treats Hispanic/Latino as an ethnic category. This table excludes Latinos from the racial categories and assigns them to a separate category. Hispanics/Latinos may be of any race.
Race / Ethnicity (NH = Non-Hispanic)	Pop 2020	% 2020
White alone (NH)	93	72.66%
Black or African American alone (NH)	1	0.78%
Native American or Alaska Native alone (NH)	0	0.00%
Asian alone (NH)	3	2.34%
Pacific Islander alone (NH)	1	0.78%
Other race alone (NH)	0	0.00%
Mixed race or Multiracial (NH)	8	6.25%
Hispanic or Latino (any race)	22	17.19%
Total	128	100.00%

== Education ==
Columbia-Brazoria Independent School District operates schools in the area.

The Texas Legislature assigned the area in Columbia-Brazoria ISD (including West Columbia) to the Brazosport College district.

== Photo gallery ==
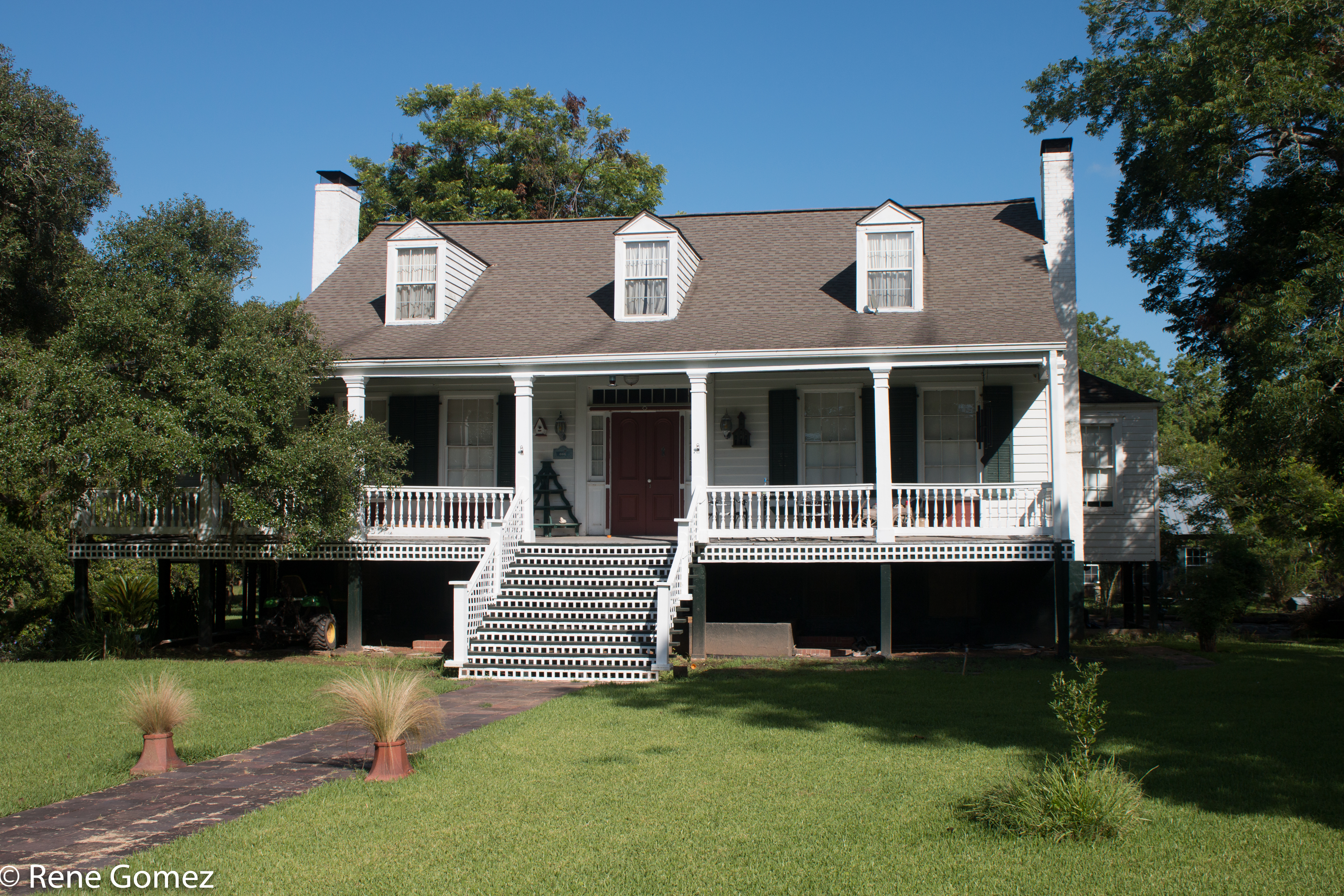

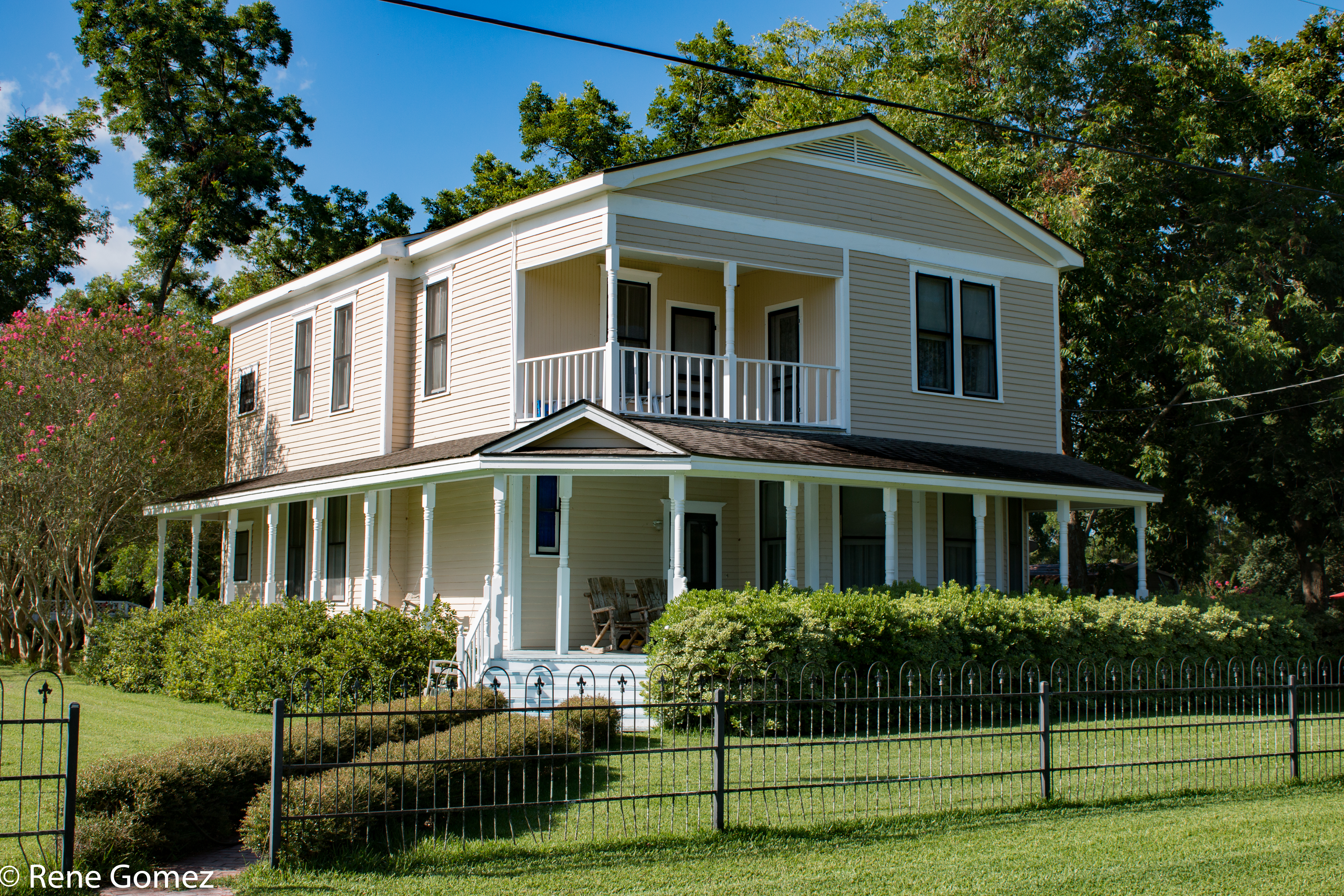

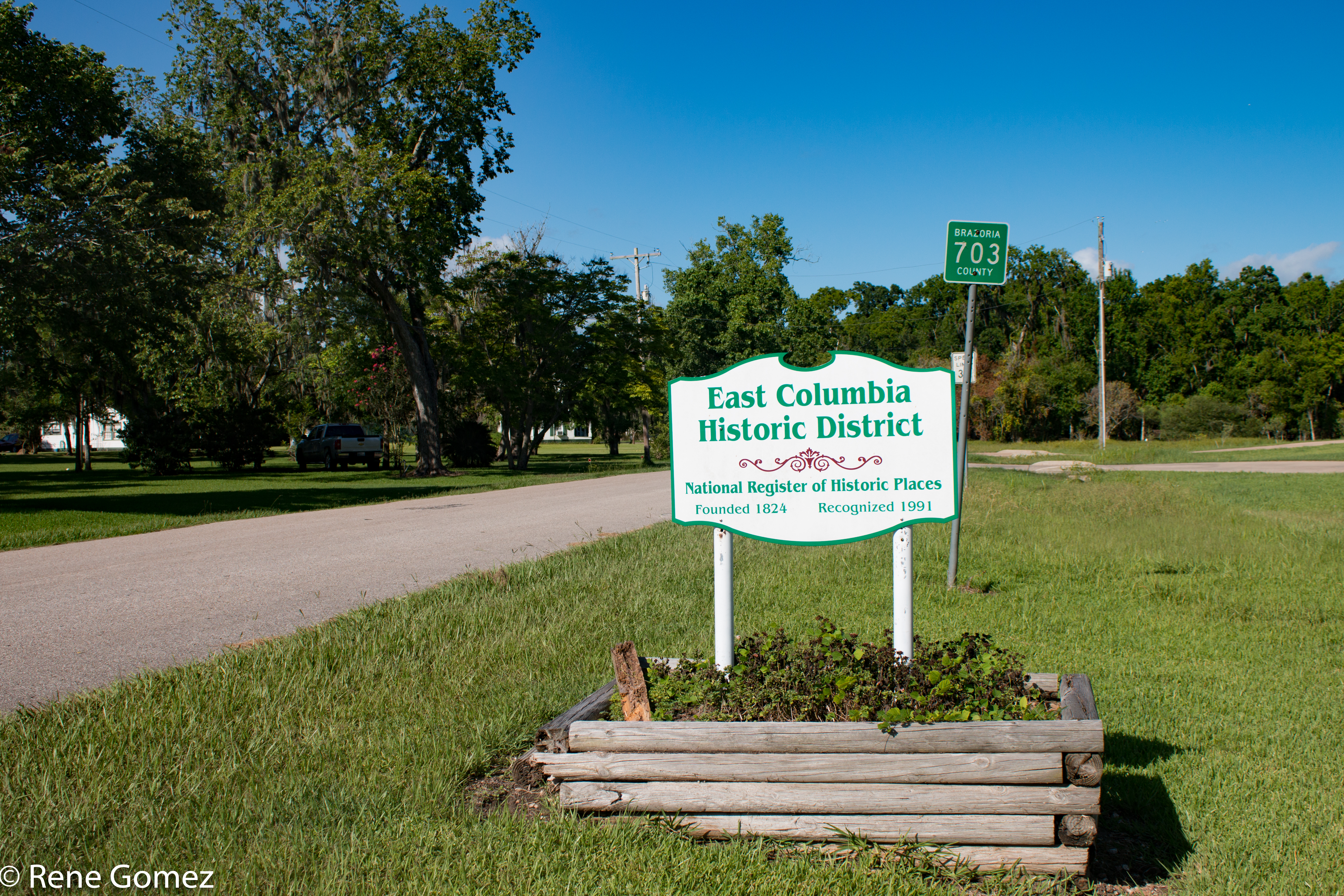

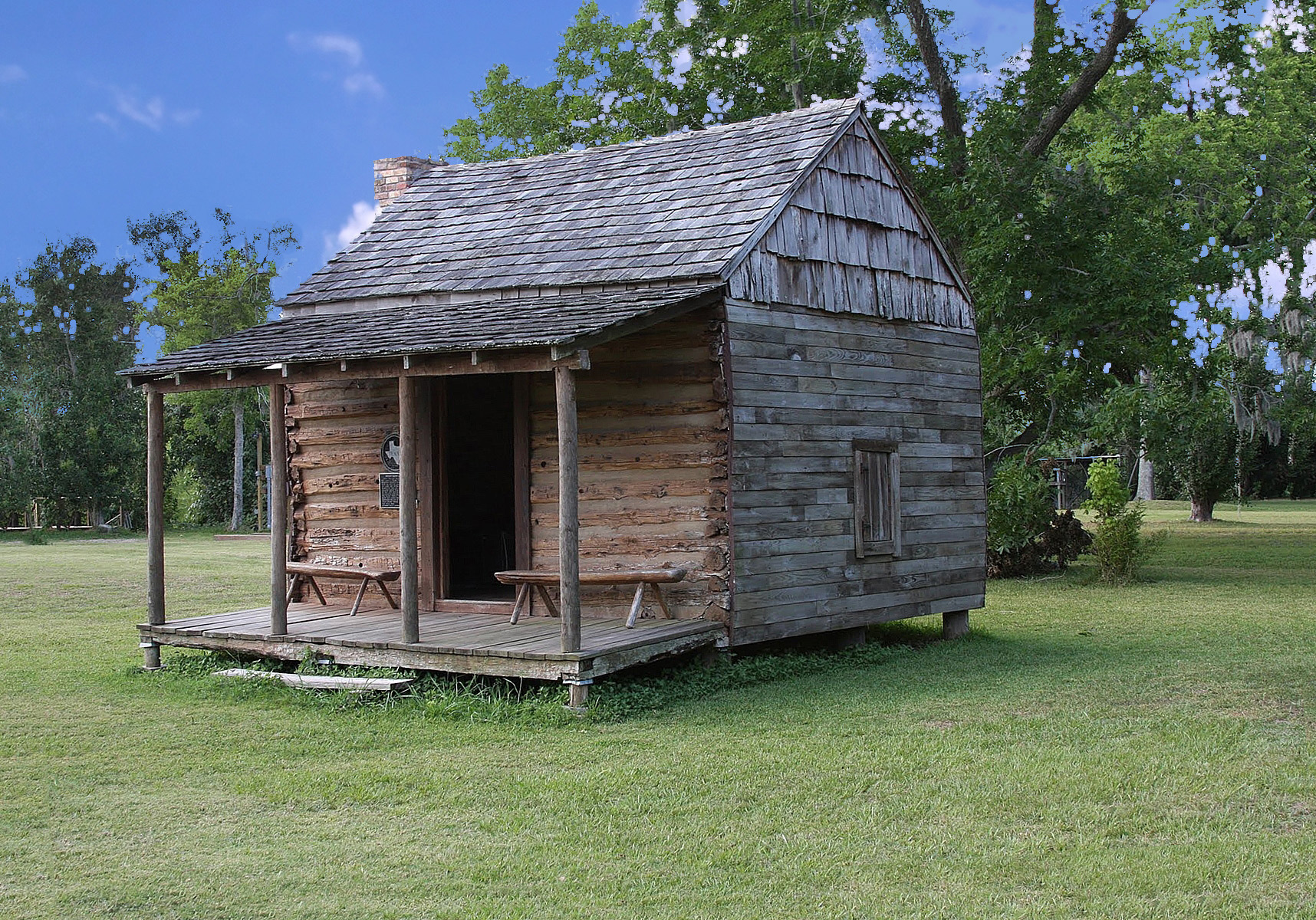

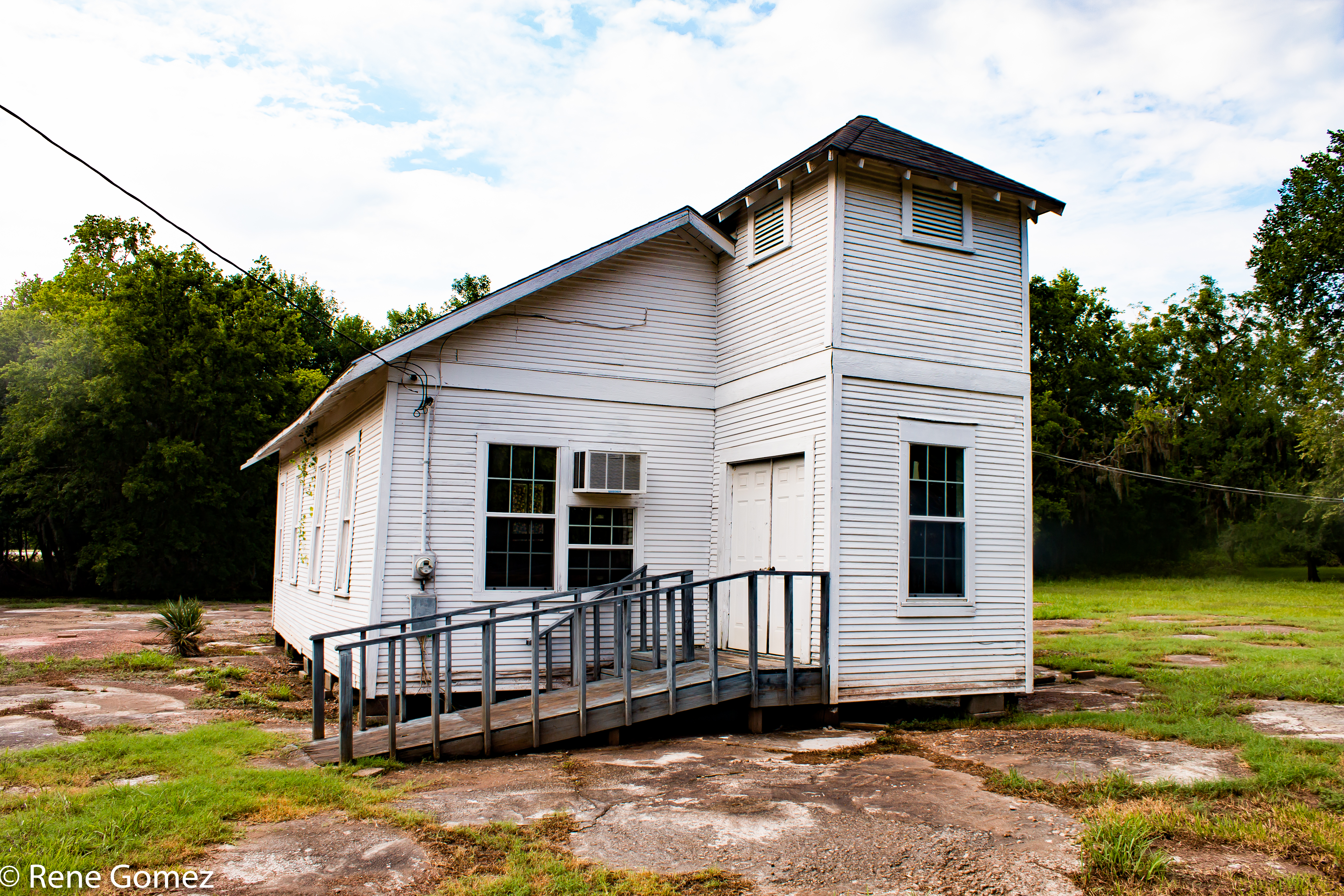

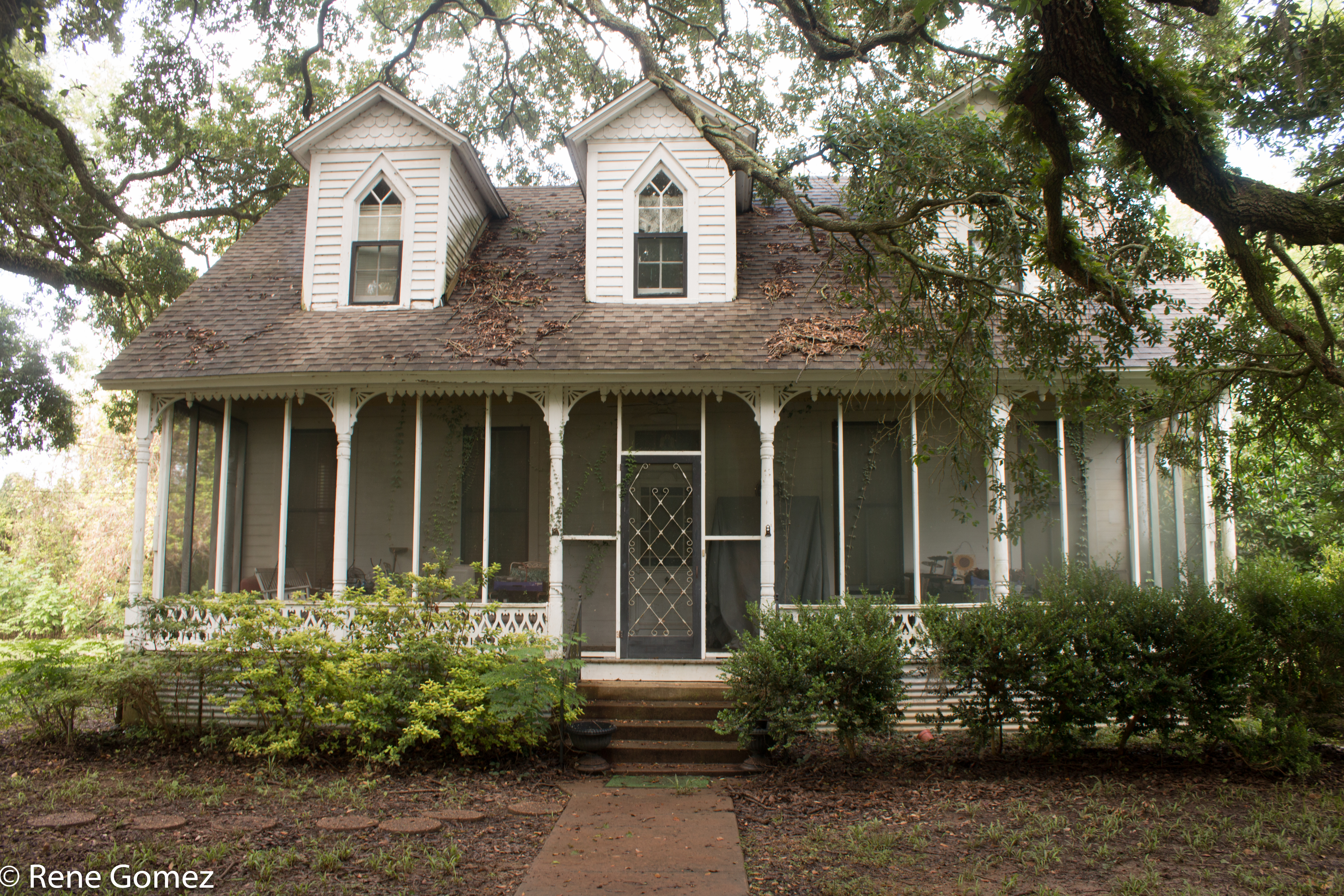

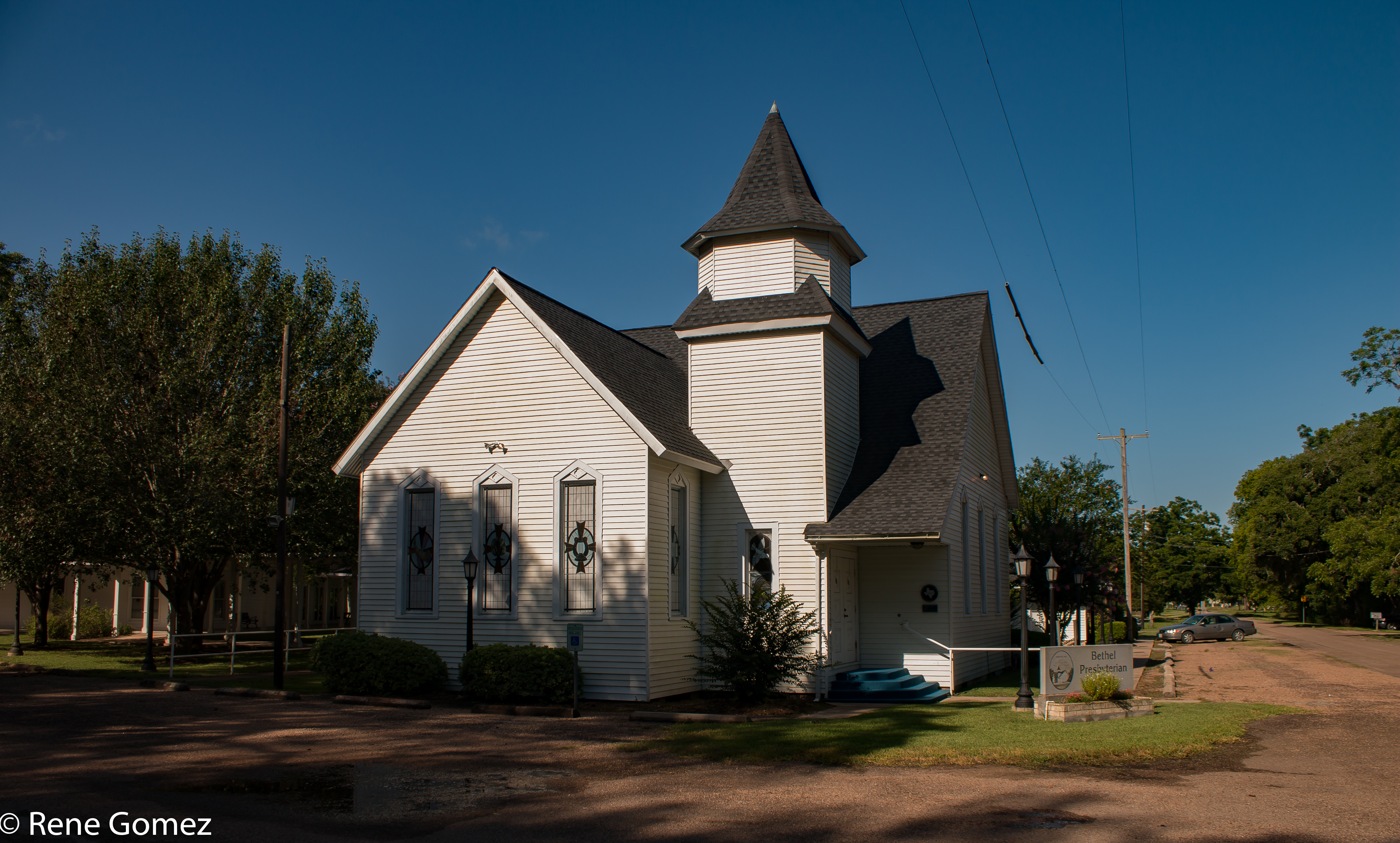

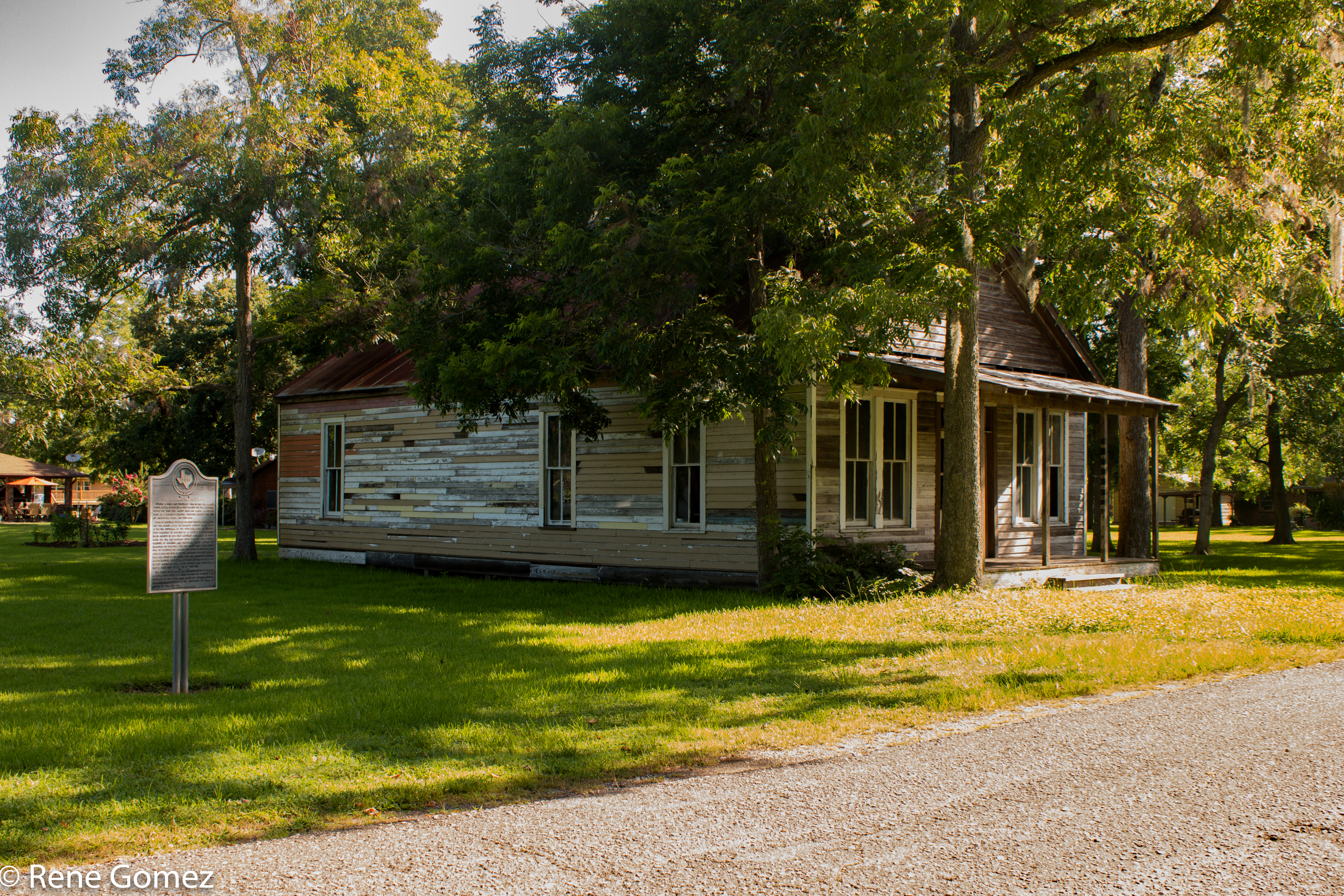

== See also ==
- List of census-designated places in Texas
