= Light Townsend Cummins =

American educator and historian (born 1946)

Light Townsend Cummins (born April 23, 1946) is an American educator and historian. He was the Bryan Professor of History at Austin College in Sherman, Texas prior to his retirement in 2018 and was the official State Historian of Texas from May 2009 to July 2012.

== Education ==
Cummins grew up in San Antonio, Texas, attending the San Antonio Academy, Alamo Heights High School, and TMI — The Episcopal School of Texas. He holds a bachelor's and master's degree from Texas State University–San Marcos. He earned a PhD in history from Tulane University.

== Professional activities ==
Cummins has been a Fulbright Scholar and an Associate of the Danforth Foundation. In 1993, Governor of Texas Ann Richards appointed Cummins to serve on the Stephen F. Austin Bicentennial Commission.

In 2003, Cummins served as historical consultant and on-camera commentator for Louisiana: A History, a six-episode television series celebrating the 200th anniversary of the Louisiana Purchase, a series produced by Louisiana Public Broadcasting and aired nationally by PBS.

Cummins has also been a member of the Board of Directors of Humanities Texas, the state based-arm of the National Endowment for the Humanities, the Louisiana Historical Association, and the Texas State Historical Association. He is a former president of the Southwestern Historical Association of the Southwest Social Science Association.

In May 2009, Governor of Texas Rick Perry appointed Cummins as the official Texas State Historian, an office whose purpose is to advance the cause of Texas history throughout the state.

== Awards ==
In 1994, Cummins was awarded the Premio de España y America by King Juan Carlos I of Spain for his scholarly research dealing with the history of Spain and the United States. Kentucky Governor John Y. Brown, Jr. commissioned Cummins a Kentucky Colonel in honor of his publications dealing with the history of the Mississippi Valley.

Cummins was awarded the Francisco Bouligny Prize for his publications dealing with Spanish colonial Louisiana and is a lifetime fellow of the Texas State Historical Association. He is also a lifetime fellow of the Louisiana Historical Association.

In 2006, Cummins was named a Minnie Stevens Piper Professor. The following year, he received the Alumni Achievement Award from Texas State University-San Marcos, and in 2011, he was honored by the university's College of Liberal Arts with its Distinguished Alumni Achievement Award. Cummins is a member of the Texas Institute of Letters.

In 2010, Cummins' book Emily Austin of Texas was given the 2010 Liz Carpenter Award from the Texas State Historical Association, a distinction given to the best book of the year dealing with Texas women.

== Books ==
Cummins has written or edited ten books and numerous articles on the history of Texas, Louisiana, and the Southwestern United States. As a historian of the Spanish Borderlands, his research interests deal with the advance of the Anglo-American frontier into the Mississippi River valley, Spanish Louisiana, and Spanish colonial Texas during the late eighteenth and early nineteenth centuries.

- A Guide to the History of Louisiana (1982)
- A Guide to the History of Texas (1988)
- Texas: A Political History (1990)
- Spanish Observers and the American Revolution (1992)
- Louisiana: A History 4th Edition (2001)
- Austin College: A Sesquicentennial History (1999)
- United States History to 1877 (2006)
- Emily Austin of Texas, 1795-1851 (2009)
- Allie Victoria Tennant and the Visual Arts in Dallas (2015)
- To the Vast and Beautiful Land: Anglo Migration into Spanish Louisiana and Texas, 1760s–1820s (2019)
