= Guy M. Bryan =

American politician (1821–1901)

Guy Morrison Bryan
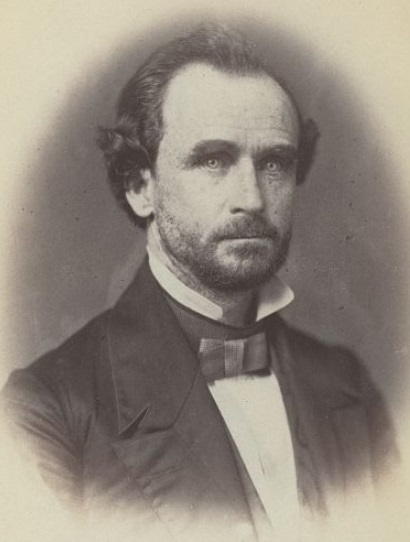

Member of the U.S. House of Representatives from Texas's 2nd district
- In office March 4, 1857 – March 3, 1859

Personal details
- Born: January 12, 1821 Herculaneum, Missouri Territory, U.S.
- Died: June 4, 1901 (aged 80) Austin, Texas, U.S.
- Resting place: Texas State Cemetery
- Party: Democratic
- Spouse: Laura Harrison Jack
- Children: Hally Ballinger Bryan Perry
- Education: Kenyon College (BA)
- Occupation: Politician

Military service
- Allegiance: Republic of Texas; Confederate States
- Branch/service: Army of the Republic of Texas; Confederate States Army
- Rank: Major
- Battles/wars: Texas Revolution; Mexican–American War; American Civil War

Guy Morrison Bryan (January 12, 1821 – June 4, 1901) was a U.S. representative from Texas.

== Biography ==
Bryan was born in Herculaneum in the Missouri Territory on January 12, 1821. His family moved to the Mexican State of Texas in 1831, and settled near San Felipe. The extended Bryan family later settled in Brazoria County, and his parents operated a sugar plantation called Peach Point. Guy Bryan attended the private school of Thomas Pilgrim in Columbia, Texas, joined the Texas Army in 1836, and took part in the Texas Revolution.

In 1842 Bryan graduated from Kenyon College in Gambier, Ohio. He studied law, but never practiced, instead becoming a sugar planter in Brazoria County. His college classmates included Rutherford B. Hayes, and Hayes visited Bryan at his plantation in 1848.

Bryan served in the Mexican–American War as a private in the Brazoria company commanded by Captain Samuel Ballowe.

During the Civil War Bryan sided with the Confederacy, and served as volunteer aide-de-camp on the staff of Paul Octave Hébert, afterwards serving as assistant adjutant general of the Trans-Mississippi Department with the rank of major. He established a cotton bureau in Houston, Texas in order to escape the Union blockade along the Gulf.

After the war Bryan moved to Galveston (1872), Quintana (1890), and Austin (1898). He was again a member of the Texas House of Representatives in 1873, 1879, and 1887 to 1891, and he served as Speaker in 1873.

Bryan was elected president of the Texas Veterans Association in 1892 and served until his death in Austin, Texas, June 4, 1901. He was interred in the Texas State Cemetery.

=== Politics ===
He was a delegate to the 1856 Democratic National Convention. Bryan was elected as a Democrat to the Thirty-fifth Congress (March 4, 1857 – March 3, 1859). He was not a candidate for renomination in 1858. He served as chairman of the Texas delegation to the 1860 Democratic National Convention in Baltimore.

==== Texas legislature terms ====
- House of Representatives
  - Representative of the Texas House of Representatives, Brazoria district from December 13, 1847 – November 5, 1849.
  - Representative of the Texas House of Representatives, District 27 from November 5, 1849 – November 3, 1851
  - Representative of the Texas House of Representatives, District 35 from November 3, 1851 – November 7, 1853
  - Representative of the Texas House of Representatives, District 12 from January 13, 1874 – April 18, 1876
  - Representative of the Texas House of Representatives, District 35 from January 14, 1879 – January 11, 1881
  - Representative of the Texas House of Representatives, District 64 from May 2, 1888 – January 13, 1891
- Senate
  - Senator of the Texas Senate, District 24 from November 7, 1853 – November 2, 1857

== Family ==
His mother was Emily Austin Perry and his father was James Bryan. His grandfather, Moses Austin, had initially obtained permission from Mexico to serve as an empresario to settle Texas. His grandmother is Mary Brown Austin. His mother Emily's brother was Stephen F. Austin. His family owned several slaves prior to 1865.

His brothers include William Joel Bryan and Moses Austin Bryan. Stephen Samuel Perry was his half-brother.

== Sources ==
- United States Congress. "Guy M. Bryan (id: B000985)". Biographical Directory of the United States Congress.

U.S. House of Representatives
Preceded by Peter H. Bell	Member of the U.S. House of Representatives from Texas's 2nd congressional district 1857–1859	Succeeded by Andrew J. Hamilton
