= James Franklin Perry =

American settler (1790–1853)

James Franklin Perry (1790–1853) was an American who was an early settler of Texas. James married to Emily Austin Perry, and together they operated Peach Point Plantation. He was involved in Texas land distribution.

== Life ==
James Franklin Perry was born in Allegheny County, Pennsylvania on September 19, 1790. He married Emily Austin on September 23, 1824. He was her second husband, and the two had six children together:

- Stephen Samuel Perry (born June 24, 1825, in Potosi, Missouri; died September 5, 1874, in Brazoria, Texas).
- Emily Rosanna Perry (born September 24, 1826, in Potosi, Missouri; died December 6, 1827, in Potosi, Missouri).
- Eliza Margaret Perry (born January 3, 1828, in Potosi, Missouri; died January 3, 1862, in Austin, Texas.
- James Elijah Brown Perry (born May 17, 1830, in Potosi, Missouri; died February 14, 1831, in Chocolate Bayou, Texas.
- Henry Austin Perry (born November 17, 1831, at Chocolate Bayou, Texas; died September 10, 1853, in Biloxi, Mississippi).
- Cecilia Perry (born December 10, 1835, at Peach Point Plantation; died June 8, 1836, at Peach Point Plantation

By marrying Emily Austin, James became owner of Peach Point Plantation and was one of the first plantation owners to shift from cotton to sugar production. He also was involved in the earliest plans for a railroad in Texas. He was offered the position of Secretary of the Treasury of the Republic of Texas in 1839, but declined. James was also the executor of the will of Stephen F. Austin (Emily Austin's brother), a distinction that directly involved him in land distribution, maps, and early Texas colonial affairs. A court case related to titles of land was at one time filed and even appealed by Sam Houston against James Franklin Perry in his capacity as executor for Stephen F. Austin.

James Franklin Perry and his son Henry each died from yellow fever on September 13, 1853. There are obituary references to James in various newspapers.

== Legacy ==
Letters between James, his wife, and their son, Stephen, serve as significant records, frequently referenced as foundational in Texas history. They were archived in the 1930s and housed at the Center for American History at the University of Texas at Austin.

Perry's Landing, in Brazoria, Texas, is named for James Franklin Perry. There is an historical marker for James Franklin Perry at the Gulf Prairie Cemetery. He is referenced as "James F. Perry" in the Supreme Court decision Bryan v. Kennett.
