= Thomas J. Pilgrim =

American educator

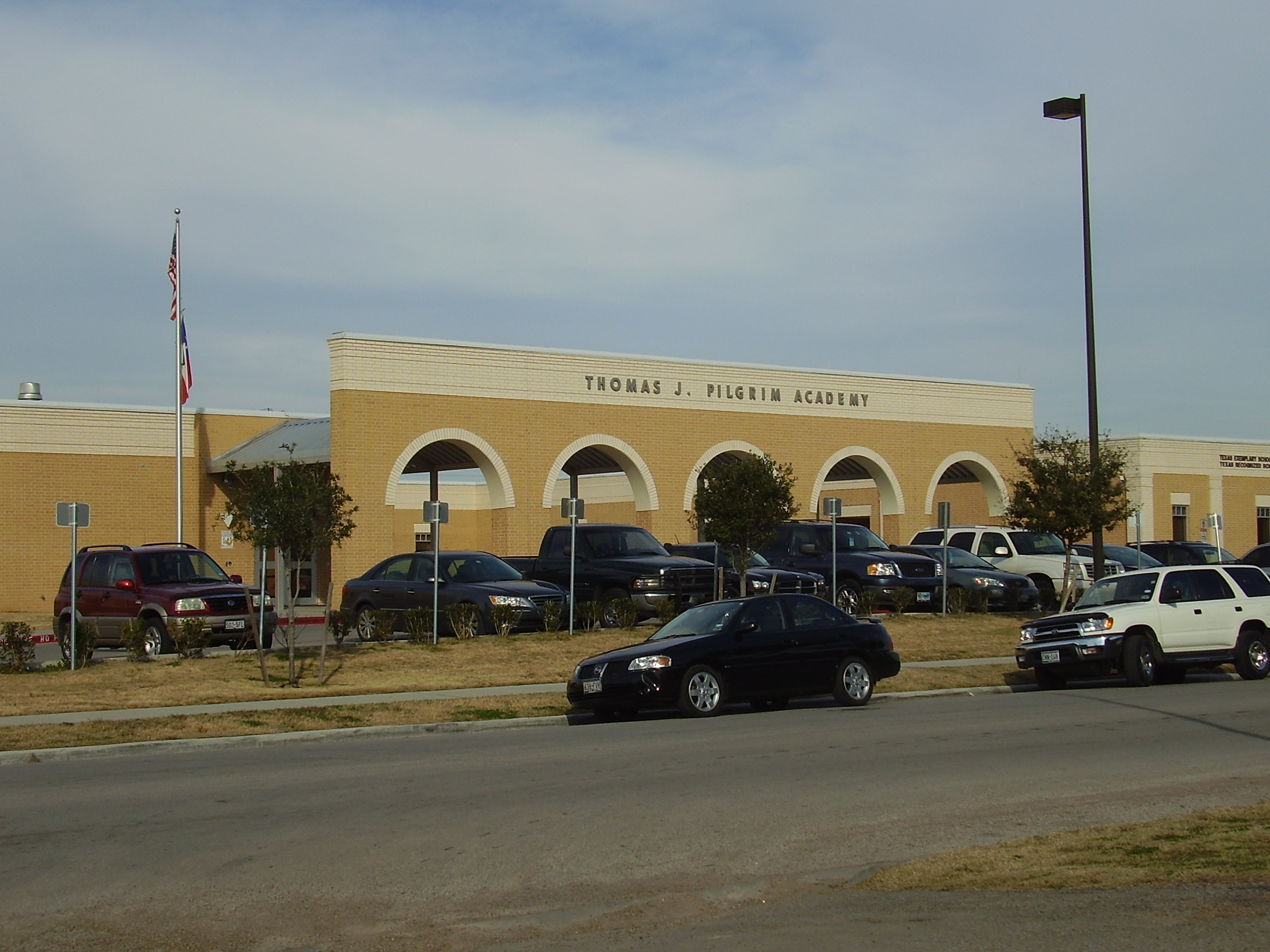
Thomas J. Pilgrim Academy, a school in Houston, Texas named after Thomas J. Pilgrim

Thomas Jefferson Pilgrim (December 14, 1804 – October 30, 1877) started the first school in Texas. The town of Pilgrim, Texas, is named for Thomas J. Pilgrim. Thomas was born to Thomas and Dorcas Pilgrim, in East Haddam, Connecticut. Thomas attended the Hamilton Literary and Theological Institute at Colgate University. In 1828, Pilgrim heard about the settlements in Texas and left school in New York to travel to Texas in the company of approximately sixty men. The pilgrimage (npi) was led by Elias R. Wightman. Pilgrim arrived at Matagorda, Texas. Soon thereafter, Pilgrim served the Austin Colony as a Spanish interpreter. Pilgrim was also a close friend of Stephen F. Austin.

== Biography ==
Pilgrim was born on December 14, 1804, in East Haddam, Connecticut, to Thomas and Dorcas Pilgrim.

=== Started First School in Texas ===
In the beginning of 1829, Pilgrim founded an all-boys school called the "Austin Academy" which was located in San Felipe de Austin. Pilgrim additionally that year began the first Sunday school in Texas; there the children sat on cut logs inside a log house. Pilgrim's Sunday school was of historical note particularly because the school was in violation of a Mexican law which prohibited Protestant worship.

=== Military service ===
In 1836, Pilgrim took part in the capture of a Mexican vessel off the coast of Matagorda. In 1840, Pilgrim fought in the Battle of Plum Creek.

=== Marriages ===
Pilgrim married Lucy M. Ives in 1839, and they lived in present-day Gonzales, Texas. Lucy died in 1839. In April 1841, Pilgrim married Sarah Jane Bennett, daughter of Major Valentine Bennett. The Pilgrims had thirteen children, but only seven reached adulthood.

=== Contributions ===
At or about 1847, Pilgrim organized the Gonzales Baptist Church Sunday school that lasted for about thirty years. Pilgrim served as a deacon of that church. Later, during the 1850s–1860s, Pilgrim served as Chairman of the Committee on Sunday Schools for the Baptist state conventions. Pilgrim was also an active Democrat and served as county treasurer and as Justice of the Peace. He died on October 30, 1877, and was buried in Gonzales.

== Legacy ==
Today the Thomas J. Pilgrim Academy is named for his honor, and that school is part of the Houston Independent School District and located at 6302 Skyline Drive, Houston TX 77057 and listed on Wikipedia under List of Houston Independent School District schools. In 1838, Pilgrim received a Republic of Texas land grant in Gonzales County, Texas. A lake and a settlement on this land were called "Pilgrim." In addition, there were three schools that were part of the Pilgrim Creek School District in the 1880s: 1) Burnett School (established in 1875 and named from another family which had come to the area); Salt Creek School (established in 1878, named for the salt flats in the area); and Lake Grove, (a school then only for blacks established in 1883). The Pilgrim Presbyterian Church and the Pilgrim Cemetery were also named for Thomas J. Pilgrim. A Texas Historical Marker was placed on the road attesting to the history of Pilgrim.
