= Jones Creek, Texas =

Village in Bazoria County, Texas, United States

- Village
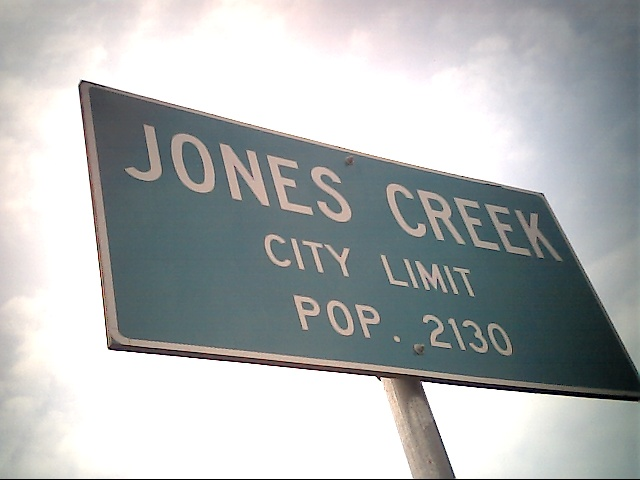
- Sign in Jones Creek indicating the population in 2000

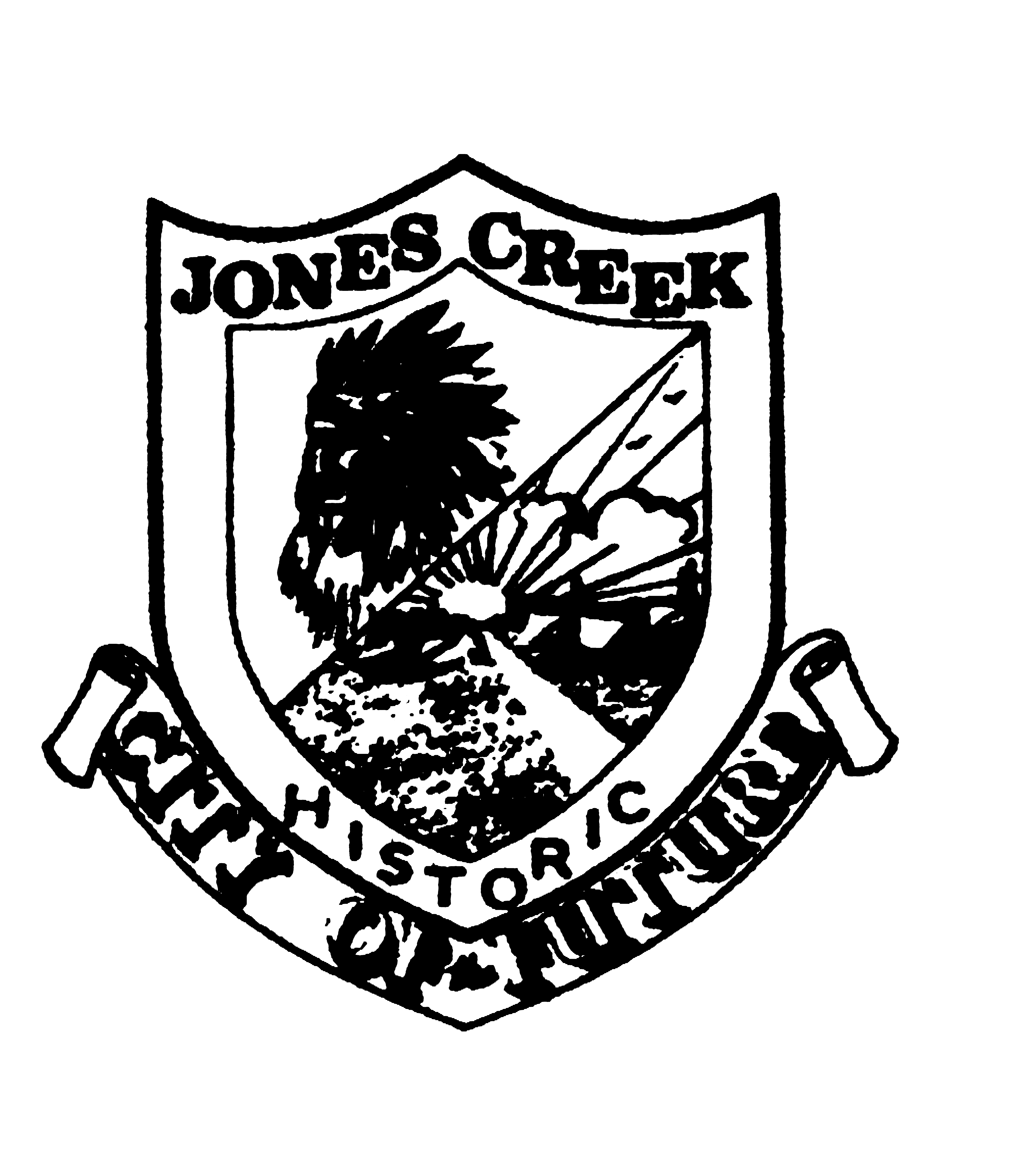
- Seal
- Motto: "The Historic City of the Future"
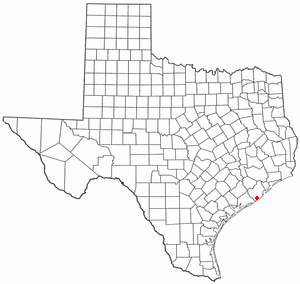
- Location of Jones Creek, Texas

- Coordinates: 28°58′07″N 95°27′19″W
- Country: United States
- State: Texas
- County: Brazoria

Government
  - Mayor: Corey Thomas

Area
  - Total: 2.54 sq mi (6.58 km^{2})
  - Land: 2.53 sq mi (6.54 km^{2})
  - Water: 0.012 sq mi (0.03 km^{2})
- Elevation: 13 ft (4.0 m)

Population (2020)
  - Total: 1,975
  - Density: 782/sq mi (302/km^{2})
- Time zone: UTC-6 (Central (CST))
  - Summer (DST): UTC-5 (CDT)
- ZIP code: 77541
- Area code: 979
- FIPS code: 48-37984
- GNIS feature ID: 1360387
- Website: www.villageofjonescreektexas.com

Jones Creek is a city in Brazoria County, Texas, United States. The population was 1,975 at the 2020 census. It is the first location in Texas where Stephen F. Austin settled.

== History ==
The Father of Texas, Stephen F. Austin, first settled in Jones Creek. His original grave resides in the Gulf Prairie Cemetery located on Gulf Prairie Road in Jones Creek. Emily Austin Perry (Stephen F. Austin's sister) and her second husband, James Franklin Perry settled in Jones Creek too at the now historic Peach Point Plantation. Jones Creek is named for Randal Jones, a military leader of early lower Brazos Anglo colonists. Jones led the June 22, 1824, attack on a group of Karankawa Indians on the banks of a certain small stream of water in the lower Brazos region. Afterwards this particular creek near the San Bernard River became associated with the name "Jones", and the event was noted in history as the Battle of Jones Creek. Thereafter, the area around the creek became described as Jones Creek too.

There are Recorded Historic Texas Landmarks in Jones Creek for each of the following:

- Major Reuben R. Brown
- Battle of Jones Creek
- Major Guy M. Bryan
- William Joel Bryan
- Major James Peckham Caldwell
- Ellerslie Plantation
- Gulf Prairie
- Henry William Munson
- Peach Point
- Little Old House at Peach Point
- Emily Margaret Brown Austin Bryan Perry
- James Franklin Perry

== Geography ==
Jones Creek is located in southern Brazoria County. Texas State Highway 36 runs through the community, leading east 6 miles (10 km) to Freeport and northwest 9 miles (14 km) to Brazoria.

According to the United States Census Bureau, the village has a total area of 2.6 square miles (6.8 km^{2}), of which 2.6 square miles (6.7 km^{2}) is land and 0.039 square miles (0.1 km^{2}), or 1.61%, is water.

Notable parts of Jones Creek include: Perry's Landing (also known as Perry Landing), Peach Point, Peach Crest, and Gulf Park.

== Demographics ==
Historical population
Census	Pop.	Note	%±
1970	1,763		—
1980	2,634		49.4%
1990	2,160		−18.0%
2000	2,130		−1.4%
2010	2,020		−5.2%
2020	1,975		−2.2%
U.S. Decennial Census; 2020 Census

As of the census of 2000, there were 2,130 people, 772 households, and 606 families residing in the village. The population density was 812.0 inhabitants per square mile (313.5/km^{2}). There were 835 housing units at an average density of 318.3 per square mile (122.9/km^{2}). The racial makeup of the village was 88.08% White, 0.52% African American, 0.28% Native American, 0.61% Asian, 8.26% from other races, and 2.25% from two or more races. Hispanic or Latino of any race were 18.17% of the population.

There were 772 households, out of which 35.9% had children under the age of 18 living with them, 67.6% were married couples living together, 6.1% had a female householder with no husband present, and 21.4% were non-families. 18.4% of all households were made up of individuals, and 9.1% had someone living alone who was 65 years of age or older. The average household size was 2.76 and the average family size was 3.14.

In the village, the population was spread out, with 29.3% under the age of 18, 5.7% from 18 to 24, 26.4% from 25 to 44, 26.2% from 45 to 64, and 12.3% who were 65 years of age or older. The median age was 37 years. For every 100 females, there were 105.8 males. For every 100 females age 18 and over, there were 97.9 males.

The median income for a household in the village was $42,378, and the median income for a family was $48,269. Males had a median income of $40,694 versus $21,875 for females. The per capita income for the village was $20,023. About 7.3% of families and 10.7% of the population were below the poverty line, including 16.7% of those under age 18 and 7.5% of those age 65 or over.

== Education ==
Stephen F. Austin Elementary School, named after the Father of Texas, used to serve the Jones Creek area. Austin Elementary, "The Pride of Jones Creek", was a Pre-K through sixth grade school, the only one in the district. The school's mascot was the gator, referencing the 11-foot (3.4 m) alligator that was found on the school grounds after flooding in 1989.

The city is served by the Brazosport Independent School District. Jones Creek residents attend:

- Freeport Elementary School
- Lanier Middle School
- Freeport Intermediate School
- Brazosport High School

The city is also served by Brazosport College. The Texas Legislature designated the Brazosport ISD as in the Brazosport College zone.

The city is served by the Brazoria County Library System.

== Government ==
The city incorporated in 1970. The city government holds regular meetings.

Jones Creek has lately gained a reputation among drivers in Southeast Texas as being a speed trap for vehicles passing through the community along Highway 36.

The speed limit through the City of Jones Creek is governed by the Texas Department of Transportation (TXDOT), not the city council.

== See also ==
- List of municipalities in Texas
