= 1938 San Antonio pecan shellers strike =

Historic labor action

The 1938 San Antonio pecan shellers strike was a labor strike involving 12,000 pecan shellers in San Antonio, Texas, United States. Considered the largest labor strike in San Antonio's history, it saw mainly Mexican American pecan shellers, organized by labor activist Emma Tenayuca, protest wage cuts by the Southern Pecan Shelling Company. Starting on January 31, the strike lasted until March 8, when the two sides agreed to arbitration that led to a wage increase for the pecan shellers.

== Background ==
During the 1930s, 40% of the pecan crop in the United States was grown in Texas, with half of that being produced within a 250-mile radius of San Antonio. Described as the "world's largest pecan shelling center", between 10,000 and 20,000 workers, primarily Mexican American women, worked as shellers, removing the hard outer shell of pecans grown and collected in the region. Many of them worked in poor conditions for low pay. The average weekly family income for pecan shellers was between $1.00 and $4.00, (Note: The Texas State Historical Association gives slightly more specific values of between $2.00 and $3.00 per week.) with many shellers having to supplement their seasonal income with additional farm labor. Additionally, the workrooms were often cramped centers often lacking proper ventilation, running water, and tools for shelling, with many of the shellers having to use their hands to shell the pecans. An increased rate of tuberculosis among the shellers was also pinned on the lack of proper ventilation and an abundance of pecan particulates in the workrooms.

In the 1930s, the Southern Pecan Shelling Company, owned by Julius Seligman (Note: Also given as Seligmann.), dominated the pecan shelling industry both in San Antonio and nationwide, shelling between one-fourth and one-third of the total national output of pecans. This company, like many others in the area, utilized a contract system whereby he sold contractors whole pecans at $0.10 per pound and purchased back the fully shelled pecans at $0.30 to $0.36 per pound, with the contractors handling all labor issues and facilitating the shelling facilities needed. In 1933, Seligman hired Magdaleno Rodríguez to organize a company union, the Pecan Shelling Workers' Union. However, this union was short-lived, and in 1937 its remnants were reorganized into the Texas Pecan Shelling Workers' Union, supported by the Communist Party of America, who appointed Albert Gonsen as its leader. That same year, the United Cannery, Agricultural, Packing, and Allied Workers of America (UCAPAWA), affiliated with the Committee for Industrial Organization (CIO), granted a charter to the San Antonio pecan shellers with the understanding that the union would include other labor groups. This included the San Antonio branch of the Workers Alliance of America, founded a year prior by Emma Tenayuca to help assist the pecan shellers.

On January 31, 1938, contractors for the Southern Pecan Shelling Company announced a pay cut for pecan shellers from $0.07 to $0.06 per pound for shelled pecan halves and $0.06 to $0.05 per pound for shelled pecan pieces. Wages for pecan crackers were reduced from $0.50 to $0.40 per one hundred pounds of pecans. Following this, 12,000 shellers, or approximately two-thirds of the workforce, spontaneously walked out. This was not the first strike action taken by the pecan shellers, as mass strikes had occurred previously in 1934 and 1935 over wage cuts, with both ending without success.

== Course of the strike ==
Initially, the faction of the Pecan Shellers' Union organized around Gonsen were unsupportive of the strike, but the UCAPAWA offered its support for the strikers. Tenayuca shortly emerged as the leader of the movement, with the strikers electing her as their committee chair. While Tenayuca was not a pecan sheller, she was well known among the pecan shellers for her organization and activism in the Workers Alliance, which Tenayuca claimed had over 10,000 members at the time. Covering the incident, Time reportedly highlighted Tenayuca's communist philosophy and painted her as the puppeteer behind the strike. San Antonio mayor C. K. Quin and other public officials also employed red-baiting to draw public support away from the strikers. This strategy largely succeeded, as many moderates spoke out about the strike's perceived communist influence. In an interview with the San Antonio Light, the police chief argued that there was no strike and that the incident was part of a ploy by communists and not sanctioned by the CIO. Roman Catholic Archbishop of San Antonio Arthur Jerome Drossaerts also spoke out against the strike and praised efforts by the police. However, La Prensa, a major Hispanic newspaper in the city, was sympathetic to the strikers.

Over the course of the strike, hundreds of protestors and picketers were arrested and imprisoned by the police, including Tenayuca. Additionally, all soup kitchens in the city were closed to the strikers. As tensions increased, Texas governor James V. Allred ordered an investigation into possible violations of civil liberties, with a meeting held on February 14 chaired by the assistant state attorney. While the commission found that the police had overstepped their authority, no actions were taken against them. Concurrently, there were calls from within the UCAPAWA for Tenayuca to step down from her position as strike leader due to concerns about her communist affiliation. Ultimately, Tenayuca agreed to step down, and she was replaced by UCAPAWA president Donald Henderson. Speaking of the incident years later, Tenayuca expressed frustration and resentment towards the push to remove her, but she did for the greater good of the movement. After her removal, Tenayuca continued to support the strike in less prominent ways. Around this same time, the strikers received support from several sources. Texas Representative and future Mayor of San Antonio Maury Maverick stated his support for the strike. The American Civil Liberties Union also began to offer help to the strikers, and a rally was held on March 19 at Military Plaza to celebrate the release of some imprisoned strikers.

By March, both sides had agreed to resolve the labor dispute through arbitration. On March 8, the pecan shellers returned to work as the union and pecan companies agreed to arbitration via a three-person panel that included Austin, Texas mayor Robert Thomas Miller. The panel returned its decision on April 13, mandating a one-half cent increase in wages from the previous rates. Furthermore, the UCAPAWA local was recognized as the only legal representative for the pecan shellers.

== Aftermath ==
The wage increase decided by the arbitration panel was considered more favorable to the employers than to the shellers. However, these wages were increased in October following the implementation of the Fair Labor Standards Act of 1938, which instituted a $0.25 minimum wage. Fearing that this wage increase would lead to mechanization, both the union and pecan companies appealed to have the pecan shellers exempted from the minimum wage requirement, which was ultimately denied. Following this, the pecan shelling industry turned to mechanization, and by 1941 approximately 10,000 shellers permanently lost their jobs, though many found new employment as the United States mobilized for World War II.

Following the strike, Maverick, who had lost reelection for the House of Representatives, successfully ran for mayor of San Antonio in 1938, with major support from Mexican Americans in the city. Tenayuca would later write a political essay, "The Mexican Question in the Southwest", that discussed the strike, Tenayuca's politics, and issues facing Mexican Americans in the southwestern United States.

== See also ==
- 1933 Funsten Nut strike - An earlier strike involving pecan processors in St. Louis
- Luisa Moreno - An UCAPAWA labor activist who was involved in the strike

== Bibliography ==
- Chavey, S. M. (February 1, 2019). "This week in 1938, pecan shellers began the largest strike in San Antonio history". San Antonio Express-News. Hearst Communications.
- Croxdale, Richard. "PECAN-SHELLERS' STRIKE". Texas State Historical Association.
- Danner, Patrick (May 22, 2015). "Pecan shellers strike was major labor win". San Antonio Express-News. Hearst Communications.
- González, Gabriela (2007). Castañeda, Antonia; Armitage, Susan H.; Hart, Patricia; Weathermon, Karen (eds.). Gender on the Borderlands: The Frontiers Reader. University of Nebraska Press. ISBN 978-0-8032-3384-3 – via Google Books.
- González, Gabriela (2018). Redeeming La Raza: Transborder Modernity, Race, Respectability, and Rights. Oxford University Press. ISBN 978-0-19-991414-2 – via Google Books.
- Gower, Patricia E. "Unintended Consequences: The San Antonio Pecan Shellers Strike of 1938". University of the Incarnate Word.
- Joseph, Harriett Denise (2018). From Santa Anna to Selena: Notable Mexicanos and Tejanos in Texas History since 1821. University of North Texas Press. ISBN 978-1-57441-723-4 – via Google Books.
- Kirkpatrick, Brian (September 4, 2018). "San Antonio's 'Dark Chapter': Remembering Pecan Shellers' Strike of 1938". Texas Public Radio.
- Ledesma, Irene (2004). Irwin, Mary Ann; Brooks, James F. (eds.). Women and Gender in the American West. University of New Mexico Press. ISBN 978-0-8263-3599-9 – via Google Books.
- "This week in history: Pecan shellers strike in San Antonio". People's World. January 29, 2018.
