= Evergreen Plantation =

Evergreen Plantation may refer to:

- Evergreen Plantation (Grenada, Mississippi), listed on the NRHPs in Mississippi (Grenada County)
- Evergreen Plantation (Wallace, Louisiana), listed on the NRHP in Louisiana
- Evergreen Plantation in Brazoria County, Texas; belonged to Alexander Calvit and was later known as Herndon Plantation.
- Evergreen Plantation in Prince George County, Virginia, birthplace of Edmund Ruffin.
- Evergreen (Haymarket, Virginia) NRHP in Prince William County, Virginia
