= Jane Herbert Wilkinson Long =

"Mother of Texas"

- Born: Jane Herbert Wilkinson; July 23, 1798; Charles County, Maryland
- Died: December 30, 1880 (aged 82); Fort Bend County, Texas
- Occupations: Boarding house owner, planter
- Spouse: James Long
- Relatives: James Wilkinson (uncle); Alexander Calvit (brother-in-law)

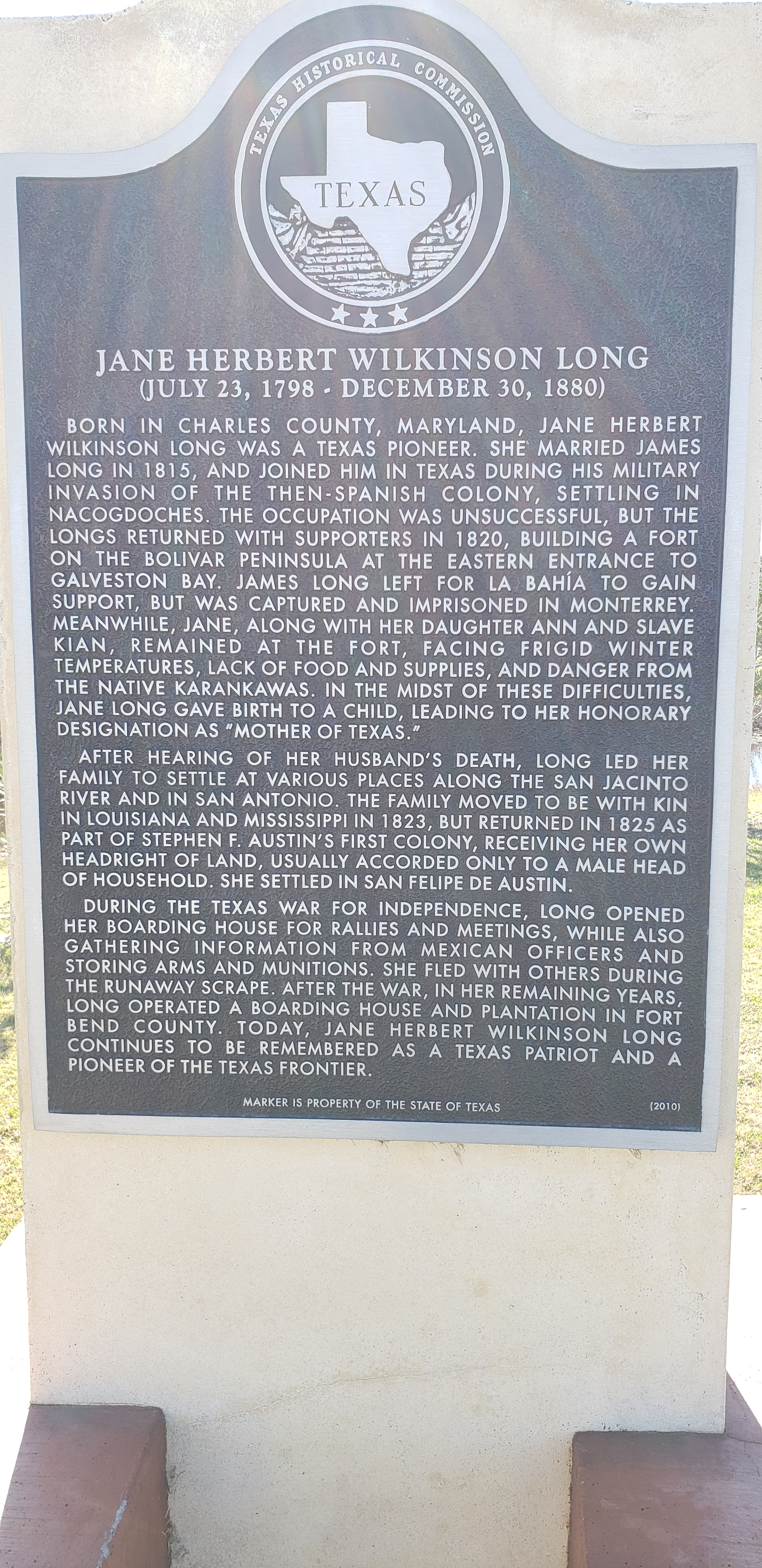
Texas historical marker for Jane Long located at Fort Travis Seashore Park, Bolivar Point

Jane Herbert Wilkinson Long (July 23, 1798 – December 30, 1880) was a Texas pioneer. She owned boarding houses and a plantation in Texas. She is best known as the "Mother of Texas."

== Biography ==
=== Early life ===
Jane Herbert Wilkinson Long was born on July 23, 1798, in Charles County, Maryland. She was a niece of General James Wilkinson; her father was James' eldest brother, William Mackall Wilkinson (c.1751–1799).

About 1811, her family moved from Maryland to the small town of Washington, Mississippi, the capital of the Mississippi Territory.

=== Adult life ===
She moved to Texas with her husband in the 1820s. In 1822, her husband died after being captured by Spanish/Mexican forces and she became a widow. Stephen F. Austin gave Jane grants of land in Fort Bend and Waller counties; but instead of farming, she opened a boarding house in San Felipe, Texas.

She sold part of her land in Fort Bend County, on which the town of Richmond was built. She later moved to Richmond, where she opened a boarding house and started a plantation nearby.

=== Personal life ===
Jane was married in Natchez, Mississippi, in 1815 to James Long, a doctor and a native of Virginia. He had led a filibuster expedition attempting to take control of Spanish Texas in 1819, and in a second attempt in April 1820 he brought his pregnant wife and 300 troops to join refugees from the first expedition on the Bolivar Peninsula near present-day Galveston. Forced to surrender along with his troops at Presidio La Bahía in October 1821, he was killed by a guard on April 8, 1822, during imprisonment in Mexico City.

Meanwhile, left behind at Bolivar Point (now Port Bolivar), Jane gave birth on December 21, 1821, to her third child, Mary James Long, with her only slave, Kian, helping. Throughout a long winter, they and her children struggled as she waited for her husband's return. At one point, several Karankawa Indians appeared, but she fired a cannon each day to make them think there was an army stationed there. Together Jane and Kian fought starvation for weeks, hunting their own game, fishing and gathering oysters, until the news of her husband's death finally reached her during the spring, whereupon they headed out. She then left Texas but returned in the later 1820s as a bona fide colonist.

Jane Long claimed to be the first woman of English descent to settle in Texas, and her daughter Mary is often said to be the first child born in Texas to an English-speaking woman, but this has been disproved by census records from 1807 to 1826 which show a number of Anglo-American births.

Nevertheless because of this, she became known as the "Mother of Texas." Sam Houston later gave the same title to Margaret Theresa Wright during a gubernatorial speech on August 1, 1857, in Wright's hometown of Victoria for Wright's heroic support of Texas troops during the Texas Revolution.

Her sister, Barbara Mackall Wilkinson, married Alexander Calvit, a sugar planter.

=== Death ===
She died on December 30, 1880, in Fort Bend County, Texas.

== Legacy ==
A number of schools within Texas have been named after the "Mother of Texas." Among them are the following:

- Jane Long Elementary School located in Freeport in the Brazosport Independent School District
- Jane Long Elementary School located in Richmond, in the Lamar Consolidated Independent School District
- Jane Long Intermediate School located in Bryan, in the Bryan Independent School District
- Jane Long Middle School located in Houston in the Houston Independent School District
- Long Early Learning Center located in Abilene, in the Abilene Independent School District
- A marker in Fort Bend County, Texas was erected in her honor in 1936.
- Jane W Long Elementary located in Harlingen, in the Harlingen Consolidated Independent School District
- Jane Long Elementary School located in Midland, Texas, in the Midland Independent School District
