= James Long (filibuster) =

American filibuster and head of the Long expedition (1793–1822)

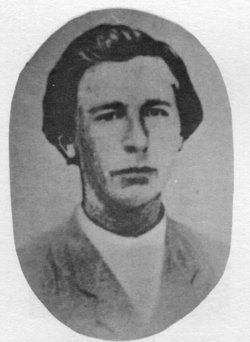

President of the Republic of Texas (Long Republic) (Unrecognized Claimant)
- In office June 22, 1819 – October 28, 1819
- Preceded by: Office Established
- Succeeded by: Office Abolished

Personal details
- Born: February 9, 1793 Culpeper County, Virginia, United States
- Died: April 8, 1822 (aged 29) Mexico City, Mexico
- Spouse: Jane Herbert Wilkinson Long
- Occupation: Surgeon, Filibuster
- Known for: Leading several failed attempts to establish an independent republic in Spanish Texas

James Long (February 9, 1793 – April 8, 1822) was an American filibuster who led an expedition in an attempt to seize control of Spanish Texas between 1819 and 1821.

== Early life ==
James Long was born in Culpeper County, Virginia, in 1793. He became a U.S. Army surgeon and served at the Battle of New Orleans during the War of 1812. He married Jane Herbert Wilkinson Long in 1815, settled in Natchez, Mississippi, after the war, and served as a doctor at Port Gibson. In 1817, Long owned a plantation in Vicksburg.

== Filibustering ==
Many American and French settlers of the American South were opposed to the Adams–Onís Treaty of 1819 that settled the border dispute between the United States and New Spain. It aroused such strong opposition in Natchez that prominent citizens planned a filibustering expedition to conquer Spanish Texas and placed Long in command. Long teamed up with José Félix Trespalacios, a Mexican who had escaped imprisonment for fomenting rebellion against Spanish rule in Mexico. The rhetoric surrounding their first expedition received a great deal of attention, and about 200 men including Jim Bowie and Ben Milam gathered in Natchez in early 1819 for the planned invasion of Texas. Long also attempted to recruit the French pirate Jean Lafitte and his men, but Lafitte turned him down. Several of Long's recruits were former French soldiers who had started and quickly abandoned a settlement in Texas known as the Champ d'Asile in 1818.

By June 1819, the so-called Long Expedition had arrived in Texas and successfully captured Nacogdoches. His followers proclaimed Long the first president of the new "Republic of Texas" (unrelated to the later Republic of Texas that was the result of the Texas Revolution), also called the "Long Republic". Despite this initial success, Long's independent republic lasted just four months. His army eventually grew restless and many men returned to the United States, and a Spanish expedition routed Long and his remaining followers in October 1819. Long escaped to Natchitoches, Louisiana.

Undeterred by the Spanish presence, Long quickly began raising money to equip a second expedition to revitalize the failed republic. He joined refugees from the first expedition on the Bolivar Peninsula in April 1820, bringing his pregnant wife Jane and 300 troops. Though Long restored elements of the former government, the expedition stalled for more than a year as men began to desert. On October 4, 1821, Long and his troops seized Presidio La Bahía, but Spanish troops forced the expedition to surrender four days later.

== Death ==
Long was imprisoned for a time in San Antonio, and in Monterrey, Nuevo León. He was transported to Mexico City in March 1822 to plead his case before Mexican President Agustín de Iturbide, but on April 8, 1822, he was shot and killed by a guard. One of Long's followers, Benjamin Milam, believed that Trespalacios, who had been captured and freed, had bribed the guard to kill Long.

Long's widow, Jane Long, claimed to be the first woman of English descent to settle in Texas. She gave birth to Mary James Long, said to be the first child born in Texas of English descent, a claim which has been disproved by census records from 1807 to 1826 which show a number of Anglo-American births. Throughout a long winter, she and her children struggled as she waited for her husband's return. At one point, several Karankawa Indians appeared, but Long fired a cannon each day to make them think there was an army stationed there. During the spring, the news of her husband's death finally reached her. Jane Long left Texas but returned in the 1820s as a bona fide colonist.
