= José Félix Trespalacios =

Mexican politician (??–1835)

1st Governor of Mexican Texas
- In office August 1822 – April 1823
- Preceded by: Antonio María Martínez (last governor of Spanish Texas)
- Succeeded by: Luciano García

Personal details
- Died: August 4, 1835 Allende, Chihuahua, Mexico
- Profession: Military and Political

José Félix Trespalacios (died August 4, 1835) was the first governor of Coahuila y Texas as part of the United Mexican States.

== Career ==
Trespalacios was a member of the militia in Chihuahua but then in 1814 was charged with organizing rebellion and was sentenced to death. His sentence was reduced to ten years in prison, but he escaped and joined the forces of Sebastián González (or Gonzales). He was captured again in 1816 and was imprisoned at San Juan de Ulúa but managed to escape. At this point Trespalacios fled to New Orleans and joined forces with James Long, becoming part of the second Long Expedition after the first part of it was destroyed in Nacogdoches. He then joined forces with Benjamin Rush Milam and invaded the Yucatan. Trespalacios went to Campeche, where he was arrested and locked up in prison. However, later he was released by Iturbide. Thus, he later became colonel of cavalry by the regency.

From August 1822 to April 1823 Trespalacios served as governor of Texas. From 1831 to 1833 he served as a member of the Mexican Senate from Chihuahua. On January 10, 1833, he was appointed inspector general and commander of Chihuahua, before leaving the army on December 15, 1834. He died on August 4, 1835, in Allende, Chihuahua.

== Sources ==
- A database of early Texas history, see the part under the James Long expedition
