= Military Plaza =

Coordinates: 29°25′29″N 98°29′40″W

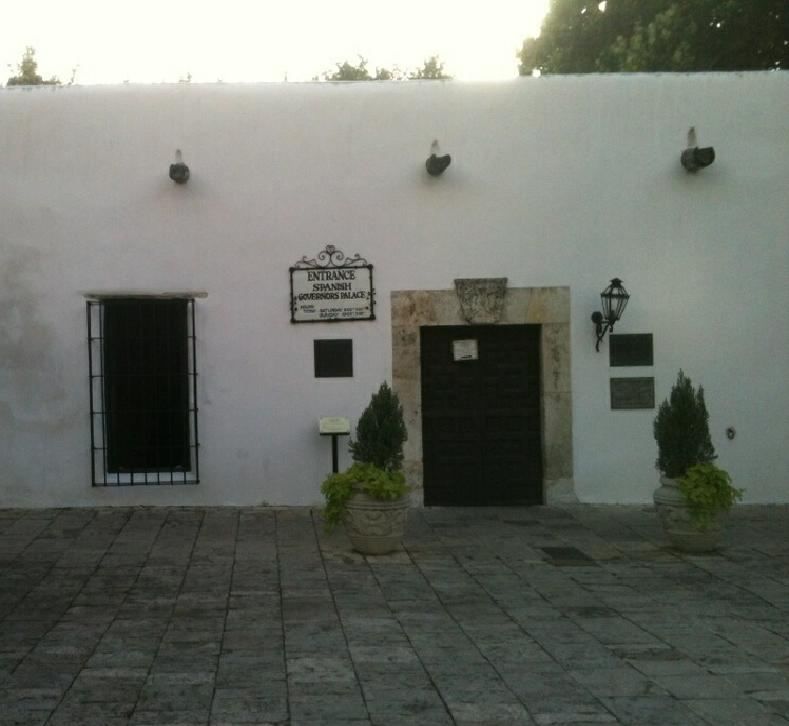
The Spanish Military Governor's Palace from 1749 in Military Plaza.

The Military Plaza (Plaza de Armas) in San Antonio, Texas dates back to the 18th century as a military and commercial center in San Antonio. It is the location of San Antonio City Hall and the Spanish Governor's Palace.

== See also ==
- Main and Military Plazas Historic District
- Market Square (San Antonio)
