= Emma Tenayuca =

Mexican American labor leader

- Born: December 21, 1916; San Antonio, Texas, U.S.
- Died: July 23, 1999 (aged 82); San Antonio, Texas, U.S.
- Other name: La Pasionaria de Texas
- Occupations: Educator, labor organizer

Emma Beatrice Tenayuca (December 21, 1916 – July 23, 1999) was an American labor leader, union organizer, civil rights activist, and educator. She is best known for her work organizing Mexican workers in Texas during the 1930s, particularly for leading the 1938 San Antonio pecan shellers strike. She was also known for her involvement with the Communist Party USA to advocate for Mexicans and Mexican Americans.

== Personal life ==
Tenayuca was born on December 21, 1916 in San Antonio, Texas. She grew up as the first daughter in the family of Sam Tenayuca and Benita Hernandez Zepeda's 11 children. Tenayuca began living with her grandparents at an early age in order to ease the burden on her parents. She was born into a Mexican-American family, and their lineage in South Texas predated both Mexican independence and the Mexican–American War. The Tenayuca family were hit hard by the Depression, and all around her, Emma began to see the suffering of low class workers.

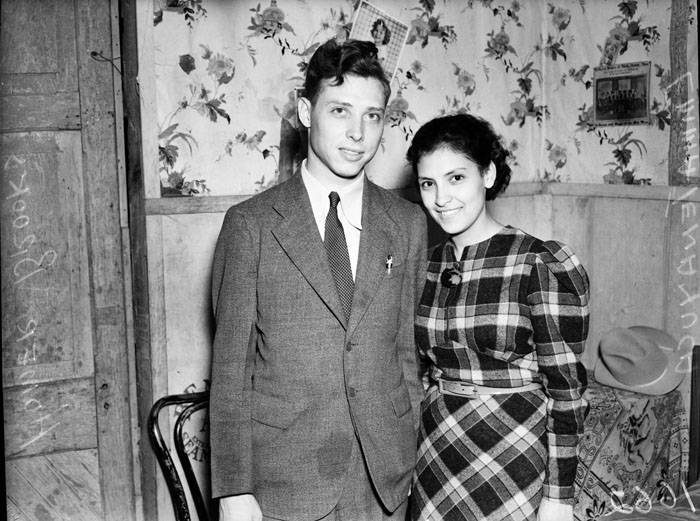
Photograph shows the couple, Emma and Homer Brooks standing together in the Tenayuca family home.

In 1938 she married organizer Homer Bartchy, who used the alias "Homer Brooks". Eventually, Tenayuca went on to pursue a college degree. She divorced Brooks in 1941 and left her hometown in order to attend San Francisco State College where she majored in education. Tenayuca distanced herself from communism as well, after learning of Joseph Stalin’s terror regime. She later earned a master's in education from Our Lady of the Lake University in San Antonio. From there she went on to teach in Harlandale School District until her retirement in 1982.

== Political involvement ==
Was I in a state of panic or fear? No. I was pretty defiant.
[I fought] against poverty ... high infant death rates, disease
and hunger and misery. I would do the same thing again.

— Emma Tenayuca

Emma was raised by her grandparents who were very interested in state and local politics. It was here that she received her first political lessons. As a young girl, Tenayuca began to form an understanding of politics by listening to speakers of the Mexican Revolution while in Milam Square on Sundays. By seeing these speakers and learning about their causes, it was here that she formed connections of how capitalism victimized groups of working-class people.

In high school, Tenayuca began her journey of organized politics by joining the Ladies LULAC auxiliary. She wasn’t in association with the group for long as she soon found she disagreed with the LULAC’s policy of encouraging U.S.-born Mexicans to distance and distinguish themselves from foreign-born Mexicans. She rebelled against the LULAC for seeing Mexicans as lower second-class citizens. She also joined a reading group keeping up to date on current events and wrote of society’s injustice in a student newspaper. She graduated from Brakenridge High School in 1934 and continued to develop her political journey.

In 1937, Emma Tenayuca joined the U.S. Communist Party. She joined because the Communist Party shared her beliefs in equality and support for struggling minorities. Due to anticommunist beliefs in the United States, Tenayuca was targeted and criticized due to her affiliation with the Communist Party. Employers, churches, and other authorities created a red-baiting campaign to paint Tenayuca as a radical.

Less than a year later, she was scheduled to speak at a small Communist Party meeting at the Municipal Auditorium permitted by the San Antonio Mayor, Maury Maverick. A crowd of 5,000 attacked the auditorium with bricks and rocks "huntin' Communists." Police helped Tenayuca escape from the mob, but she was blacklisted and forced to move out of San Antonio.

Still wanting to advocate for Mexican American rights, she even ran for office as a party representative for Texas in 1938. Although she never officially claimed to be a part of the Communist Party, she was still heavily associated with it due to her involvement with communist-led organizations in the labor movement and her marriage to a publicly announced communist.

In 1940, Tenayuca was the Communist Party nominee for the U.S. House of Representatives in Texas's 20th congressional district. She finished third to the Democratic and Republican candidates, winning 76 votes out of 56,447 cast.

In 1946, Emma Tenayuca decided to leave the Communist Party because of disappointment.

== Labor union and political activism ==
She became interested in activism and was a labor activist before graduating from Brackenridge High School in San Antonio. Tenayuca's first arrest came at the age of 16, in 1933, when she joined a picket line of workers in strike against the Finck Cigar Company. After high school, Tenayuca obtained a position as an elevator operator, but she continued working for human rights. Tenayuca was exposed to many hardships in her community. Often as a young child, she would go to the Plaza del Zacate (Grass Plaza), a public square where socialists and anarchists would come to speak and work with families with grievances. Many Mexican and Mexican Americans in San Antonio at the time had fled the Mexican Revolution during 1910s and were excluded from the New Deal's jobs and housing programs. Additionally, Mexican Americans were facing massive deportations due to fears that they were stealing U.S. jobs and because of reduced jobs available during the Great Depression.

=== Labor strike of 1938 ===
San Antonio was a major hub of the pecan industry, partially due to the use of Mexican workers as a cheap source of labor. In 1938, thousands of San Antonio pecan-shellers started a spontaneous strike in protest of poor working conditions, with Tenayuca serving as the strike committee chair. Tenayuca was just 21 years old when the strike occurred in the community. During the strike, up to 12,000 walked off the job in protest of a salary reduction from five cents a day to three cents a day and terrible working conditions. For the duration of the strike, Tenayuca and the employees were subjected to a variety of hardships, including violent encounters with law enforcement and company goons. Workers of Mexican and Chicano descent who picketed faced clubbing, tear gas, and arrests. The police imprisoned roughly 1,000 strikers, including Tenayuca herself. Local newspapers depicted the strike in a negative light, often attacking Tenayuca for her ties to communism.

Tenayuca worked tirelessly to ensure that the workers' demands were met. She organized picket lines, delivered speeches, and used her communication skills to garner support from other unions and organizations. After two months of the strike, a board of arbitration brought an end to the strike and brought recognition for the pecan-shellers union, which made it so the pecan companies were obligated to listen to and negotiate with the union. The Fair Labor Standards Act increased the minimum wage to twenty-five cents an hour in October of that same year, but in 1939 pecan companies began using pecan-shelling machines to avoid this. Because of her efforts, Tenayuca was pictured and profiled in Time magazine.

I was arrested a number of times.
I don't think that I felt exactly fearful.
I never thought in terms of fear.
I thought in terms of justice.

— Emma Tenayuca

=== Workers Alliance of America ===
Following her leadership of the 1938 demonstration against the San Antonio City Council, Tenayuca was accused of "inciting a riot" and "disturbing the peace," but the accusations were dropped for a lack of supporting documentation. Despite this setback, Tenayuca continued her activity and worked until the late 1940s for the Workers Alliance of America (WAA) and other labor unions. The WAA was established in 1935 by the Communist Party USA (CPUSA) as a front organization to mobilize the unemployed, underemployed, and unskilled workers who were shut out of traditional unions during the Great Depression. The organization's goal was to promote government-funded unemployment insurance, employment aid programs, and the defense of workers' rights. She gained the respect and admiration of her coworkers and the larger labor movement because of her persistence and unflinching dedication to the cause of workers' rights. Tenayuca constantly fought to organize employees and advance the objectives of the organization as a prominent and outspoken WAA member.

== Civil rights activism ==
=== Women’s League for Peace and Freedom ===
Emma Tenayuca was also a member of the Woman's League for Peace and Freedom (WLPF), a worldwide feminist group that was established in 1915 with the mission of advancing social justice, equality, and disarmament. In the late 1930s, shortly after the protest in San Antonio, Tenayuca became involved in the Women's Liberation Party (WLPF). In 1940, she attended the international convention of the Women's Liberation Movement for Peace (WLPF) in Washington, D.C., as a delegate, representing the San Antonio branch of the organization. Tenayuca's participation in the convention allowed her to discuss the importance of peace and disarmament amidst the hostilities of World War II.

=== Protests against beating Mexican migrants from U.S. Border Patrol ===
In 1942, while serving as the National organizer for the Workers Alliance of America, Emma Tenayuca led a demonstration in San Antonio against the U.S. Border Patrol's brutal beating of a group of Mexican migrants. The Border Patrol personnel physically assaulted the migrants and then left them in the desert to die of their injuries. Tenayuca's outrage over the incident led her to organize the demonstration, which drew attention to the inhumane treatment of migrants at the U.S.-Mexico border. In 1944, Tenayuca again demonstrated against the Border Patrol's violent treatment of migrants. Her rally in San Antonio, attended by over 1,500 people, was a powerful condemnation of the cruel and inhumane practices of the Border Patrol. These protests reveal Tenayuca's strong commitment to fighting against injustices faced by Mexican migrants and her unwavering determination to create a more just and equal society.

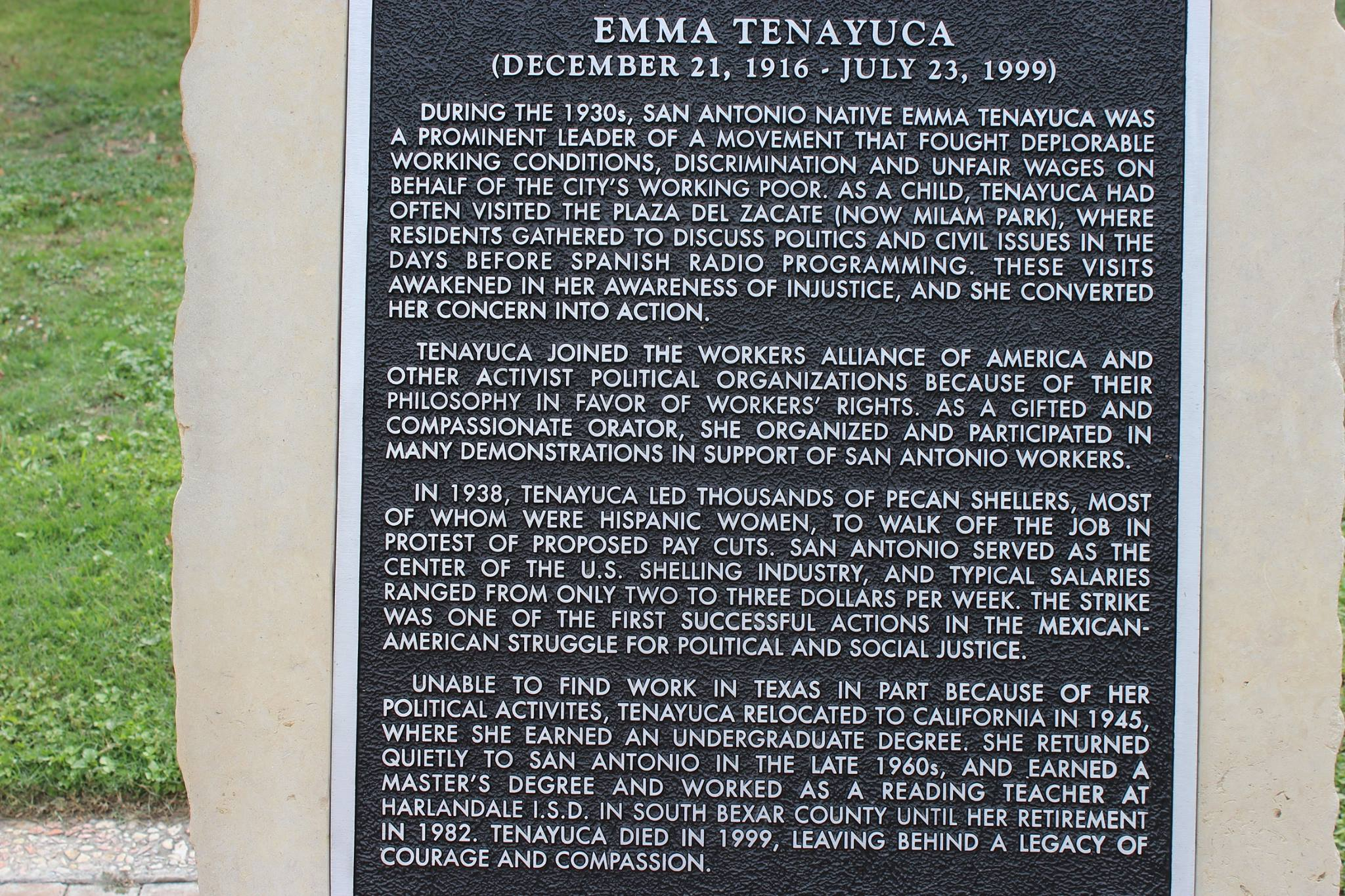
Plaque to honor Emma Tenayuca

== Legacy ==
Emma Tenayuca developed Alzheimer's disease after retirement and died on July 23, 1999. Tenayuca continued to inspire activists until and beyond her death. The admiration felt for her can be seen in That's Not Fair! Emma Tenayuca's Struggle for Justice, a bilingual children's book that tells the story of her contributions to the pecan sheller strike. Tenayuca's story is also seen through play-dramas written to honor her dedication and contributions. A full biography of Tenayuca's life is in the process of being written by her niece scheduled for publication in 2021. The South Texas Civil Rights Project has dedicated an annual award, The Emma Tenayuca Award, given to individuals working to protect civil rights. Tenayuca earned the nickname "La Pasionaria de Texas" (Spanish for "The Passionate One") due to her many demonstrations in the face of numerous arrests. The Party of Communists USA has a chapter named in her honor.

== See also ==
- Manuela Solis Sager
