= John Hunter Herndon =

Texas planter and judge

- Born: July 8, 1813; Georgetown, Kentucky
- Died: 1878 (aged 64–65); Boerne, Texas
- Resting place: Hempstead, Texas
- Citizenship: USA, Republic of Texas
- Occupations: Planter, lawyer, judge
- Spouse: Barbara M. W. Calvit
- Relatives: Alexander Calvit (father-in-law)

John Hunter Herndon (1813–1878) was a planter, lawyer, and judge in Texas.

== Early life ==
John Hunter Herndon was born July 8, 1813, near Georgetown, Kentucky. His father was Boswell Herndon and his mother, Barbara Herndon. He graduated from Transylvania College in Kentucky, with degrees in art and law.

== Career ==
Herndon practiced law for a brief period in Kentucky. He left Kentucky on December 12, 1837, aboard the steamship Independence traveling downstream on the Ohio and Mississippi Rivers to New Orleans, then continued to the Republic of Texas on January 15, 1838. He maintained a journal for part of his stay in Houston, recording regular entries for three months, including his excursions to Galveston. During his stay, he wrote sales contracts, and eventually, accepted an appointment as Engrossing Clerk for the Republic of Texas House of Representatives.

He relocated to Richmond, Texas, where he was admitted to the bar. He practiced law in the Second Judicial District and the Supreme Court of Texas. He claimed an estate worth $100,000 (~$2.92 million in 2024) in the 1850 US Census records for Fort Bend County. Sometime after 1850, he moved his family to Brazoria County, where he worked a plantation. He reported an estate worth $1.7 million (~$48.3 million in 2024) on the 1860 US Census, the most highly valued estate in the now-state of Texas. He lost most of its value during the American Civil War of 1861–65.

He served as President of the Buffalo Bayou, Brazos, and Colorado Railway during the Civil War, a railroad with eighty miles of track from Harrisburg to Alleyton. He participated in the Somervell Expedition. He was among the soldiers who obeyed the orders of President Sam Houston and retreated from the Rio Grande River, thus avoiding the Mier Expedition and the Black Bean Episode.

== Personal life ==
He married Barbara Mackall Wilkinson Calvit, the daughter of sugar planter Alexander Calvit (1784–1836) on August 27, 1839.

== Death ==
He died July 6, 1878, in Boerne, Texas, and is interred in Hempstead, Texas.
