= Manuela Solis Sager =

Mexican-American labor leader

Manuela Solís Sager
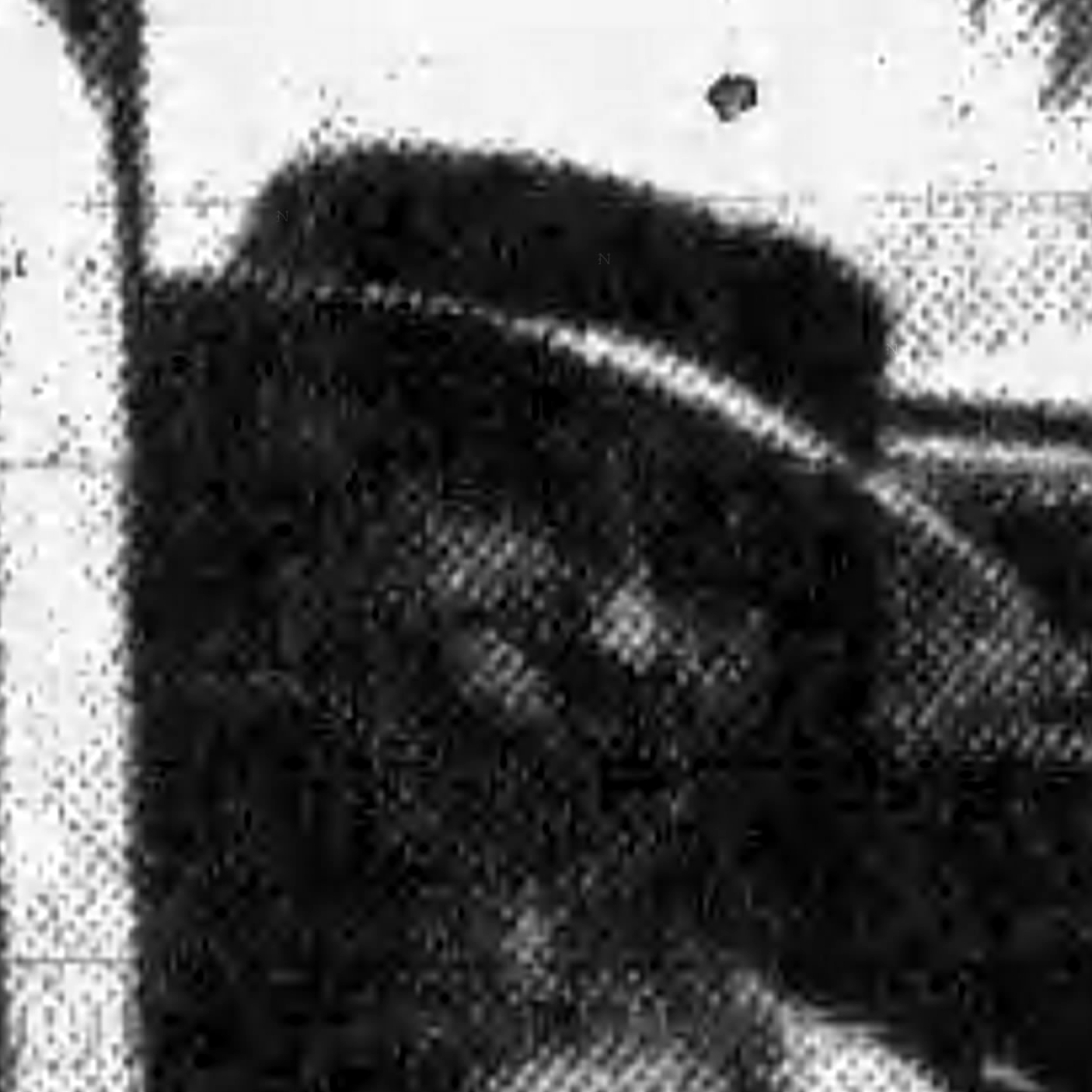
- Sager in 1984
- Born: 1912
- Died: 1996 (aged 83–84); California, U.S.
- Occupations: Educator, labor organizer

Manuela Solís Sager (1912–1996) was a Mexican American labor leader, union organizer and educator. She is best known for her work organizing with Mexican women in Texas during the 1930s, where 40% of the total Mexican population were employed almost exclusively in low paid, low status jobs.

== Life and work ==
Manuela's political career began in 1932 and 1933, when she began organizing with Tejano onion field and garment workers in Laredo.

In 1934, she was awarded a year long scholarship by La Asociacion de Jornaleros to attend Universidad Obrera de México, a left wing labour school in Mexico City. During this time she helped establish the Texas Workers Alliance in San Antonio alongside Emma Tenayuca.

On her return to Laredo in 1935, Manuela and her husband, James Sager, began to consolidate their local efforts among Mexican workers into a statewide movement. Later that year, Manuela and James were appointed official organisers of the Rio Grande Valley at a Corpus Christi conference that established South Texas Agricultural Worker's Union (STAWU), which mainly represented predominantly Mexican field and packing workers. In 1937, she became a member of the executive committee of the Workers Alliance of America, a national federation of unemployed workers organisations.

In 1938, Manuela Solis Sager and James Sager moved to San Antonio to support Mexicana and Chicana workers involved in the 1938 Pecan Shellers strikes against the Southern Pecan Shelling Company, led by Emma Tenayuca. During the strike, thousands of workers at over 130 plants protested a wage reduction of one cent per pound of shelled pecans. Workers who picketed were gassed, arrested, and jailed. The strike ended after thirty-seven days when the city's pecan operators agreed to arbitration. In October that year, the National Labor Relations Act raised wages to twenty-five cents an hour, although soon after Southern automated the shelling process.

Following the strikes, Manuela Solis Sager remained a member of the Communist Party in San Antonio, and continued to campaign and organize around the chicano movement, the feminist movement, immigrant rights, electoral politics, and against interventionist foreign policy.

During the 1970s, Manuela was a supporter of the Raza Unida Party.

She died in California in 1996, while visiting her son.

== See also ==
- Emma Tenayuca
