= Bonnie MacLeary =

American sculptor

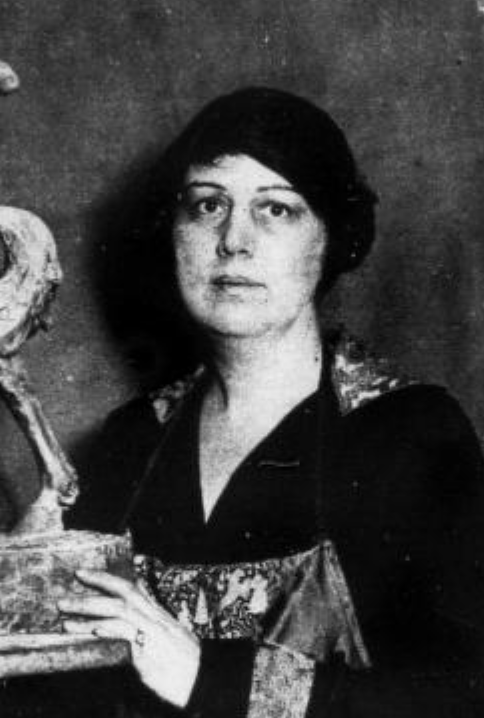
- Bonnie MacLeary, from a 1924 publication
- Born: January 2, 1886; San Antonio, Texas
- Died: February 2, 1971 (aged 85); Lakeland, Florida
- Occupation: Sculptor

Bonnie MacLeary (sometimes McLeary, which is how she signed her work) (January 2, 1886 – February 2, 1971) was an American sculptor. Some sources give her date of birth as 1890, 1892, or 1898.

== Early life ==
MacLeary was born in San Antonio, Texas, the youngest of four children of James Harvey MacLeary and his wife, Mary; at six she began creating sculptures with clay from the banks of the San Antonio River. At her parents' divorce she was taken in by her grandparents, Valentine and Helen King, who took her to New York City in 1901. She began studies there with William Merritt Chase before traveling to Paris, where in 1903 she was studying with William Adolphe Bouguereau at the Académie Julian. She also studied miniature painting in Siena before returning to New York. There she began studies with James Earle Fraser at the Art Students League of New York in 1912, choosing to pursue her career as a sculptor. Around 1910 she met Ernest Kramer while visiting family in Waco, and soon thereafter they married; they would live in Dallas, St. Louis, and New Mexico over the next few years, and visited her family in Puerto Rico, where many of them had moved, many times. When Kramer went to fight in World War I, she established a studio in New York City.

== Career ==
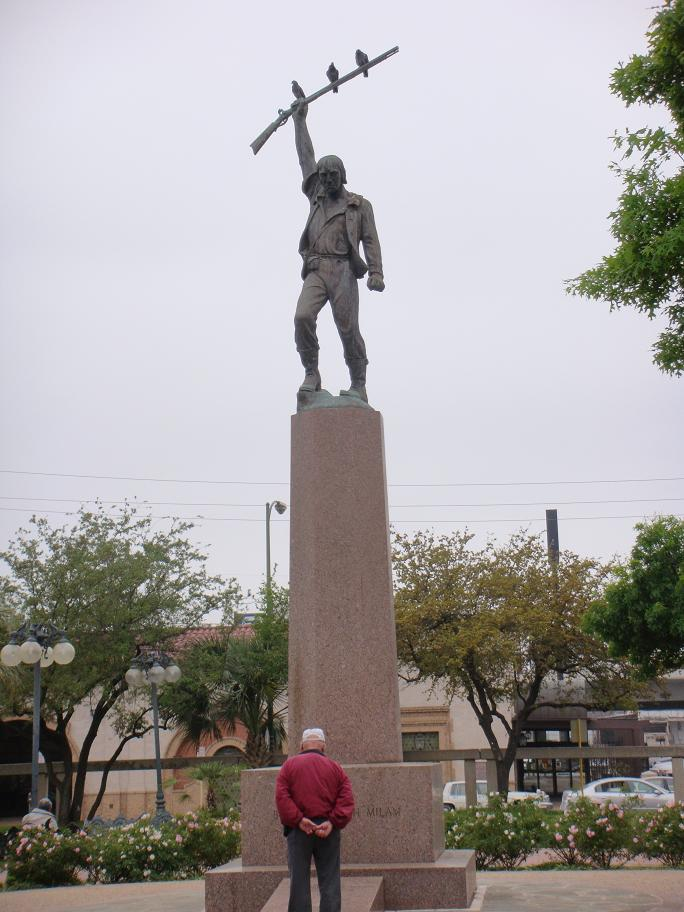
MacLeary's statue of Ben Milam in San Antonio, Texas was commissioned for the 1936 Texas Centennial.

The showing of two of her sculptures at the National Academy of Design in 1921 marked the beginning of MacLeary's career, and in 1924 her sculpture Aspiration was acquired by the Metropolitan Museum of Art. She suffered a studio fire in 1927, which destroyed many pieces; at some point during this time in her life she also divorced her husband. She quickly recovered from the loss of her workspace, and soon began winning prizes for her work. She became an associate member of the National Academy of Design in 1930; her diploma portrait in the collection is by Jerome Myers. Other organizations to which she belonged include the National Sculpture Society, the National Association of Women Painters and Sculptors, the Allied Artists of America, the American Artists Professional League, the Society of Medalists, and the Southern States Art League. During her career she would show at the Pennsylvania Academy of the Fine Arts and the National Arts Club, among other places. From the 1940s she focused on ceramic work. She resettled in Washington, New Jersey in 1955. In 1964 she and her second husband, James McGahan, moved to Florida.

MacLeary's most popular works were statues of women and children, many designed to be displayed in gardens; so successful were they that she crafted small versions to be sold in stores. Molly Spotted Elk served as the model for a number of her pieces. MacLeary rarely depicted male figures, although she did create a few memorials to men during her career. These include Benjamin Rush Milam (for the Texas Historical and Landmarks Association), A. Joseph Armstrong (at Baylor University), and Luis Muñoz Rivera (at the University of Puerto Rico). Also in Puerto Rico is a World War I memorial, Victory; other public commissions include Free Ireland (1923), in Dublin, and the Rotan Memorial at the Antoinette Memorial Home. Another memorial is in Brooklyn's Green-wood Cemetery, while a relief dedicated to the women of the Confederacy is in Montgomery, Alabama. The Witte Museum in her birth city contains examples of her work, as do numerous private collections; the Metropolitan Museum of Art sold Aspiration in 2015 for $8,750. The San Antonio Museum of Art is home to two of her works, Blessed Damozel and Fountain Figure of a Water Nymph.

== Death ==
She died at Lakeland General Hospital in Lakeland after a short illness. Her cremated remains were interred in Oakside Cemetery in Zephyrhills.
