= Alexander Calvit =

- Born: June 17, 1784; Spanish West Florida; later the Mississippi Territory
- Died: January 7, 1836 (aged 51); Brazoria District, Mexican Texas (now Brazoria County, Texas, U.S.)
- Occupation: Sugar planter
- Spouse: Barbara Mackall Wilkinson
- Children: 1
- Relatives: Jane Herbert Wilkinson Long (sister-in-law); John Hunter Herndon (son-in-law)

Alexander Calvit (1784–1836) was an early settler in colonial Texas and a sugar planter. His Evergreen Plantation lay where the town of Clute, Texas, was later built.

== Early life ==
Calvit was born on June 17, 1784, in what is now Mississippi, which was then part of Spanish West Florida and in 1798 became the Mississippi Territory of the United States. He served as a First Lieutenant and aide-de-camp in the Creek War of 1813–1814.

== Career ==
He was one of the earliest settlers in Mexican Texas, going on Stephen F. Austin's mission. As a member of the Old Three Hundred, in 1824 he received some land in what are now Brazoria and Waller Counties. This included what is now known as Clute, Texas.

He established the Evergreen Plantation, a sugar plantation in what later became known as Clute, Texas.

== Personal life ==
He married Barbara Mackall Wilkinson, sister of Jane Herbert Wilkinson Long, known as "the mother of Texas." Their daughter, Barbara, married John Hunter Herndon, a lawyer and a planter. When she inherited her father's plantation, they renamed it the Herndon Plantation and raised Arabian horses and cattle.

== Death ==
Calvit died of pneumonia on January 7, 1836, aged 51, at his home in Brazoria County (then Brazoria District, Mexican Texas).
