= Long Expedition =

1819 rebellion led by James Long

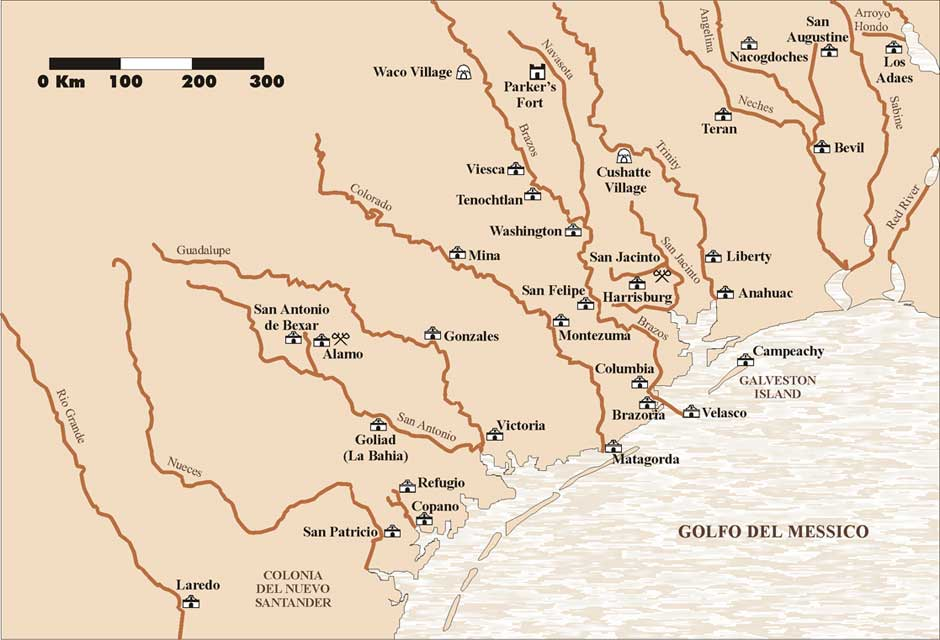
Date	June 22, 1819 – October 28, 1819
Location	Texas
Result	Spanish victory in 1819: Filibuster forces are expelled from Texas; Mexican victory in 1821: Texas is annexed to the first Mexican empire; James Long shot and killed in custody
Territorial changes	Mexico retains control over Texas

Belligerents
Spanish Empire (Until 1819) (Mexico) First Mexican Empire (From 1821)	Long Republic

Commanders and leaders
Juan Ignacio Pérez; Gaspar López	James Long †

Strength
500 soldiers	300 soldiers 2 ships

Casualties and losses
5 dead	20 dead 62 captured

Republic of Texas Long Republic
- 1819
- Flag
- Status: Unrecognized state
- Capital: Nacogdoches
- Common languages: English, Spanish
- Government: Republic
  - 1819: James Long, President
- History
  - Established: June 22, 1819
  - Disestablished: October 28, 1819
Preceded by	Succeeded by
New Spain; Spanish Empire	New Spain; Spanish Empire

The "Jane Long Flag" - the first flag of the Long Republic, and the first uniquely Texan lone star flag

The Long Expedition was an 1819 attempt to take control of Spanish Texas by unofficial military expeditions or filibusters. It was led by James Long and successfully established a small independent government, known as the Republic of Texas (distinct from the later Republic of Texas created by the Texas Revolution). The expedition crumbled later in the year, as Spanish troops drove the invaders out. Long returned to Texas in 1820 and attempted to reestablish his control. In October 1821, Long was defeated by Spanish troops, captured and sent to Mexico City where he was killed by a guard.

== Background ==
Beginning in 1810, Spanish territories in North and South America began to revolt. In particular, the Mexican War of Independence made it difficult for Spain to adequately protect its more remote territories such as Texas. Attracted by opportunity to acquire land and motivated by a sense of manifest destiny, many men from the United States joined expeditions to try to take Texas from Spain. The expeditions were largely planned in New Orleans and variously wished to establish an independent republic in Texas or assist the revolutionaries fighting within Mexico. For the first nine years of the revolt, ownership of Texas was contested. The United States claimed that the Louisiana Purchase included all of Texas, while Spain believed the boundary rested at the Red River, leaving Texas under Spanish control. The Texans later had a revolt which led to their independence. Such attempt was Texan's Green Flag Republic.

== Preparation ==
In early 1819, Spain and the United States signed the Adams–Onís Treaty, which established the boundary of the Louisiana Purchase at the Sabine River. Many Americans were outraged that the United States had abandoned any claim to Texas. Rhetoric was especially high in Natchez, Mississippi. James Long, a doctor, was one of the most vehement voices against the treaty. Public sentiment in Natchez soon swung to military action to take back territory they were convinced belonged to them. Men began to gather in Natchez for an invasion of Texas. They soon elected Long as their leader, although his only prior military experience had been as a surgeon in the War of 1812. The Natchez newspaper opined that "Never was [there] a more propitious moment for effecting their purpose." By the end of June, Long had received pledges for over $500,000, and about 200 men, including James Bowie and Ben Milam, had gathered for the expedition.

== 1819 expedition ==
Eli Harris led 120 men across the Sabine River to Nacogdoches. Long followed two weeks later with an additional 75 men. On June 22, the combined force declared a new government, with Long as president and a 21-member Supreme Council. The following day, they issued a declaration of independence, modeled on the United States Declaration of Independence. The document cited several grievances, including "Spanish rapacity" and "odious tyranny" and promised religious freedom, freedom of the press, and free trade. The council also allocated 10 square miles (30 km^{2}) of land to each member of the expedition, and authorized the sale of additional land to raise cash for the fledgling government. Within a month, the expedition had grown to 300 members.

The new government established trading outposts near Anahuac along the Trinity River and the Brazos River. They also began the first English-language newspaper ever published in Texas. The Texas Republican lasted only one month, August 1819.

Long also contacted Jean Lafitte, who ran a large smuggling operation on Galveston Island His letter suggested that the new government establish an admiralty court at Galveston, and offered to appoint Lafitte governor of Galveston. Unbeknownst to Long, Lafitte was actually a Spanish spy. While making numerous promises–and excuses–to Long, Lafitte gathered information about the expedition and passed it on to Spanish authorities. By July 16, the Spanish Consul in New Orleans had warned the viceroy in Mexico City that "I am fully persuaded that the present is the most serious expedition that has threatened the Kingdom".

With Lafitte's lack of assistance, the expedition soon ran low on provisions. Long dispersed his men to forage for food. Discipline began to break down, and many men, including Bowie, returned home. In early October, Lafitte reached an agreement with Long to make Galveston an official port for the new country and name Lafitte governor. Within weeks, 500 Spanish troops arrived in Texas and marched on Nacogdoches. Long and his men withdrew. Over 40 men were captured. Long escaped to Natchitoches, Louisiana. Others fled to Galveston and settled along Bolivar Peninsula.

== 1821 expedition ==
Second Long Expedition
Date	September 19 – October 8, 1821
Location	Presidio La Bahía, Mexican Texas
Result	Mexican victory

Belligerents
First Mexican Empire	Long forces

Commanders and leaders
Ignacio Pérez	James Long (surrendered) †

Strength
100 soldiers	52 soldiers 2 ships

Casualties and losses
5 Casualties	20 Deaths and 40 captured

Long joined the refugees at Bolivar Peninsula on April 6, 1820, with more reinforcements. He continued to raise money to equip a second expedition. Fifty men attempted to join him from the United States, but they were arrested by American authorities as they tried to cross into Texas. The men who had joined Long were disappointed they were paid in scrip, and they gradually began to desert. By December 1820, Long commanded only 50 men.

With the aid of Ben Milam and others, Long revitalized the Supreme Council. He later broke with Milam, and the expedition led an uncertain existence until September 19, 1821, when Long and 52 men marched inland to capture Presidio La Bahía. The town fell easily on October 4, but four days later Long was forced to surrender by Spanish troops under the command of Lieutenant Colonel Ignacio Pérez. He was taken prisoner and sent to Mexico City, where about six months later he was shot and killed by a guard — reportedly bribed to do so by José Félix Trespalacios.
