= Market Square (San Antonio) =

Outdoor plaza in Texas, United States

Coordinates: 29.425°N 98.499°W

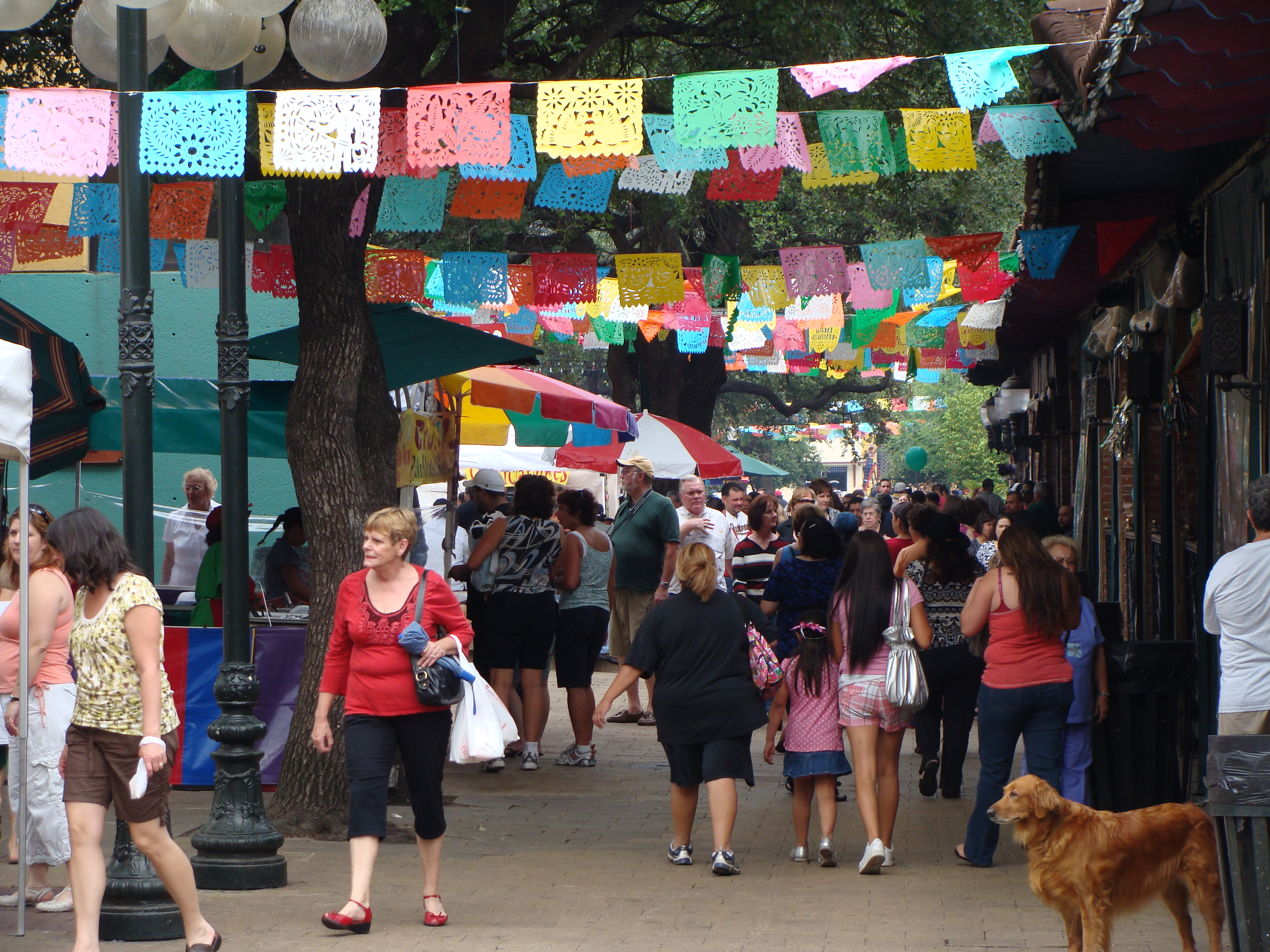
Crowds enjoying Market Square

Market Square is a three-block outdoor plaza lined with shops, and restaurants in downtown San Antonio, Texas. Market Square is the largest Mexican market in the United States. The "El Mercado" section has 32 specialty shops and the "Farmer's Market Plaza" section has 80. "Mi Tierra Cafe Y Panaderia" and "La Margarita Mexican Restaurant & Oyster Bar" are the major eateries, but snack and specialty foods are available at other shops. Market Square is the site of Cinco de Mayo in central San Antonio and many other fiestas throughout the year.

The "El Mercado" building was built as a Works Progress Administration project during 1938-1939 after the existing municipal market house (known as the Giles building) was torn down. The new building was originally named the "Municipal Truck Market", but locals commonly called it the "Farmer's Market", as farmers sold their produce straight from their trucks inside the open air building. In 1975, the last produce was sold there, and the market house underwent renovation to convert it into an enclosed air-conditioned mercado.
