= List of Texas A&M University people =

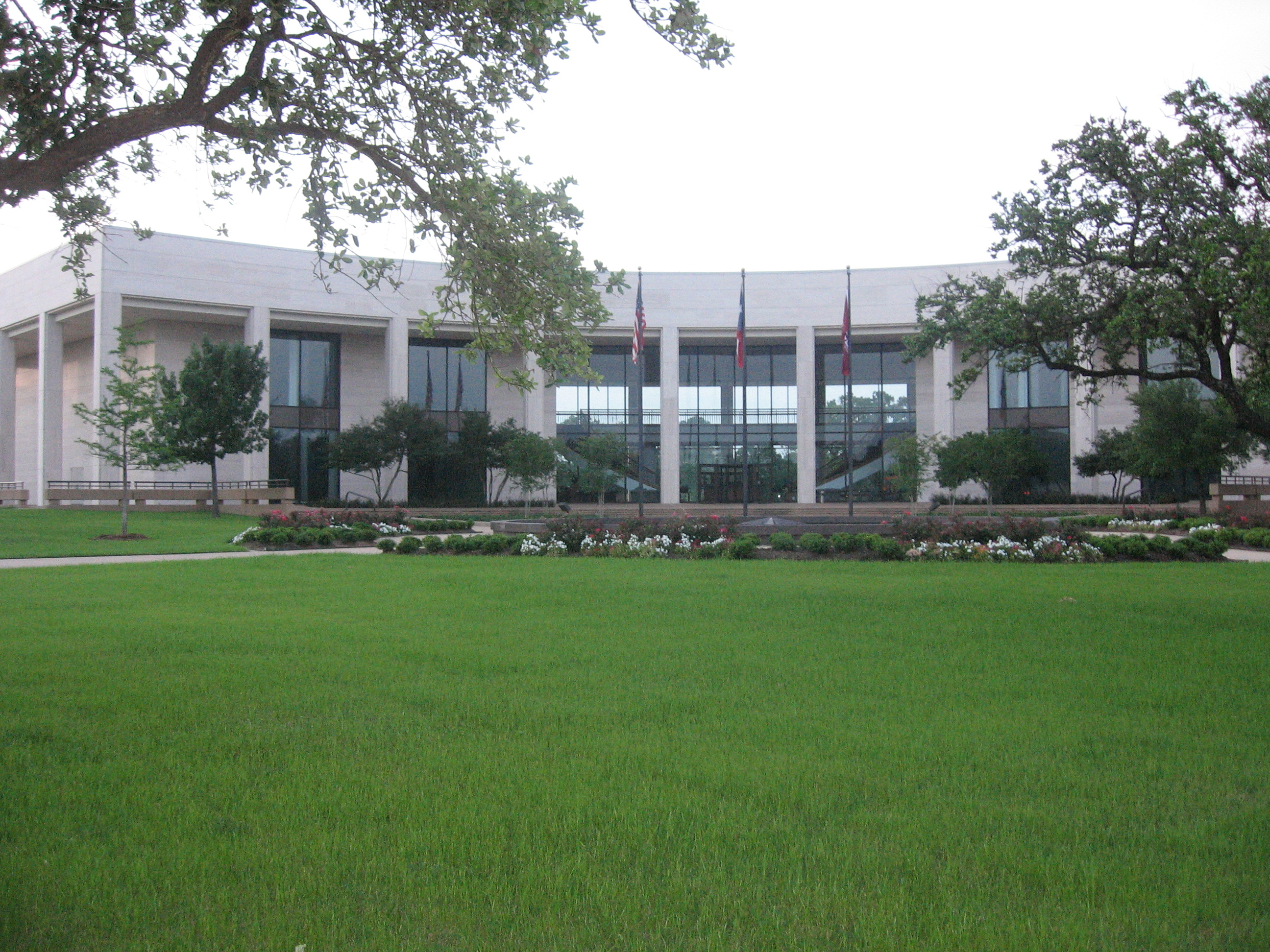
The Clayton W. Williams, Jr. Alumni Center

This list of Texas A&M University people includes notable alumni, faculty, and affiliates of Texas A&M University. The term Texas Aggie, which comes from Texas A&M's history as an agricultural school, refers to students and alumni of Texas A&M. The class year of each alumnus indicates the projected undergraduate degree award year designation, although the actual year may differ. At Texas A&M and within its student culture, the term "former student" is more commonly used than "alumnus".

== Former students ==
=== Armed forces ===
Name	Class year	Notability	References
Roderick R. Allen	1915	World War II US Army major general, commanded the 20th and 12th Armored Divisions	
Joseph W. Ashy	1962	Former Four-Star US Air Force general	
Charles Bond	1948	U.S. Air Force major general; served with the Flying Tigers in Burma and China during World War II	
A.D. Bruce	1916	Former president of the University of Houston; former United States Army major general; founded Fort Hood	
Horace S. Carswell, Jr.	1938	Medal of Honor recipient; namesake of Carswell Air Force Base near Fort Worth, Texas	
Patrick P. Caruana	1972	Former U.S. Air Force lieutenant general	
John L. Chapin	1936	Captain in the U.S. Army and Silver Star recipient during World War II; namesake of Captain John L. Chapin High School in El Paso, Texas	
Michael P. Cokinos	1943	Former United States Army Brigadier General.	
Robert W. Colglazier Jr.	1925	Former United States Army lieutenant general, commander of the Fourth United States Army	
Odell M. Conoley	1935	Former United States Marine Corps brigadier general	
Michael L. Downs	1992	United States Air Force Lieutenant general, 13th Associate Director for military affairs of the Central Intelligence Agency, 38th Vice Director of the Joint Staff	
Thomas W. Fowler	1943	Medal of Honor recipient	
William M. Fraser III	1974	Former US Air Force general	
Patrick K. Gamble	1967	Former U.S. Air Force general	
George H. Gay, Jr.	1938	Former TBD Devastator pilot; sole survivor of Torpedo Squadron 8 during the attack on the Japanese fleet in the Battle of Midway	
Robert M. Gray		U.S. Army Air force pilot who flew in the Doolittle Raid; namesake of Robert Gray Army Airfield	
John A. Hilger	1932	Former U.S. Air Force brigadier general; participant of the Doolittle Raid during World War II	
Homer S. Hill	1940	Director of Marine Aviation 1970–1972	
Tex Hill		Fighter pilot and triple flying ace; namesake of Tex Hill Middle School in San Antonio, Texas	
James F. Hollingsworth	1940	Former U.S. Army lieutenant general	
Hal M. Hornburg	1968	Former U.S. Air Force general	
Randolph W. House	1967	Former U.S. Army lieutenant general	
Lloyd Herbert Hughes	1943	Medal of Honor recipient	
Jerome L. Johnson	1956	Former Four-Star U.S. Navy Admiral	
George D. Keathley	1937	Medal of Honor recipient	
Wood B. Kyle	1936	Major general, double Silver Star recipient	
Turney W. Leonard	1942	Medal of Honor recipient	
Charles T. McDowell	1943	Professor emeritus of Russian; former director of the Center for Post-Soviet and East European Studies at the University of Texas at Arlington	
John H. Miller	1949	U.S. Marine Corps lieutenant general; veteran of three wars, later commanded Fleet Marine Force, Atlantic	
George F. Moore	1908	U.S. Army major general; commanded the Harbor Defenses of Manila and Subic Bays and the Philippine Coast Artillery during the Battle of Bataan	
Teed Michael Moseley	1971	Former chief of staff of the United States Air Force	
Raymond L. Murray	1935	Former U.S. Marine Corps major general	
John L. Pierce	1919	Brigadier general, commanded 16th Armored Division during World War II	
William M. Randolph	1916	U.S. Army aviator; namesake of Randolph Field	
James E. Ray	1964	U.S. Air Force officer; recipient of the Silver Star	
Jay T. Robbins	1940	Former U.S. Air Force lieutenant general; fighter ace with 22 aerial victories in the Pacific Ocean theater of World War II	
James Earl Rudder	1932	Former U.S. Army major general; 16th president of Texas A&M University	
Clarence Sasser		Medal of Honor recipient	
Bernard Adolph Schriever	1931	Former Four-Star U.S. Air Force general; former commander of Air Force Systems Command; namesake of Schriever Air Force Base in Colorado	
Ormond R. Simpson	1936	U.S. Marine Corps lieutenant general; commanded 1st Marine Division during Vietnam War	
Eric M. Smith	1987	U.S. Marine Corps general; 39th commandant of the United States Marine Corps	
John B. Sylvester	1967	Former U.S. Army lieutenant general; former NATO assistant chief of staff in Bosnia and Herzegovina	
Guy M. Townsend	1941	United States Air Force brigadier general, test pilot, and combat veteran	
Thomas K. Turnage	1943	United States Army Major general, 6th Director of the Selective Service System, and final Administrator of Veterans Affairs	
John T. Walker	1917	World War II U.S. Marine Corps lieutenant general; led 22nd Marine Regiment during Battle of Eniwetok and received the Navy Cross	
Otto P. Weyland	1923	Former Four-Star U.S. Air Force general; former commander of Tactical Air Command	
Eli L. Whiteley	1941	Medal of Honor recipient	
Matthew O. Williams	2025	Medal of Honor recipient	
Robert B. Williams	1923	World War II US Army Air Corps major general; led raid on Schweinfurt	

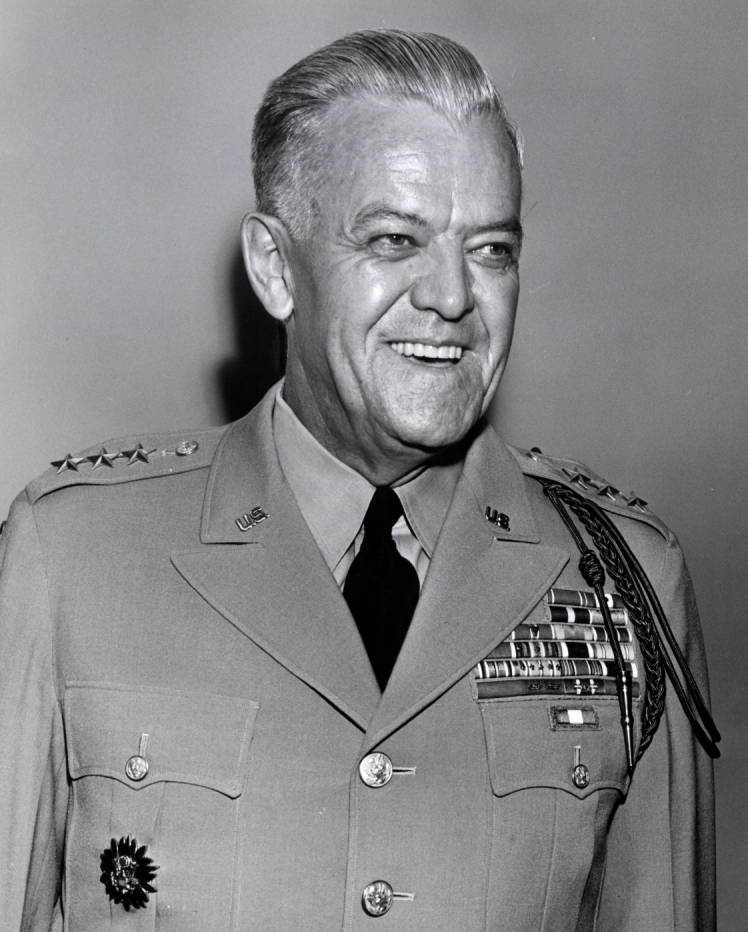
A.D. Bruce, former U.S. lieutenant general

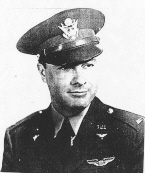
Horace S. Carswell, Jr., Medal of Honor recipient

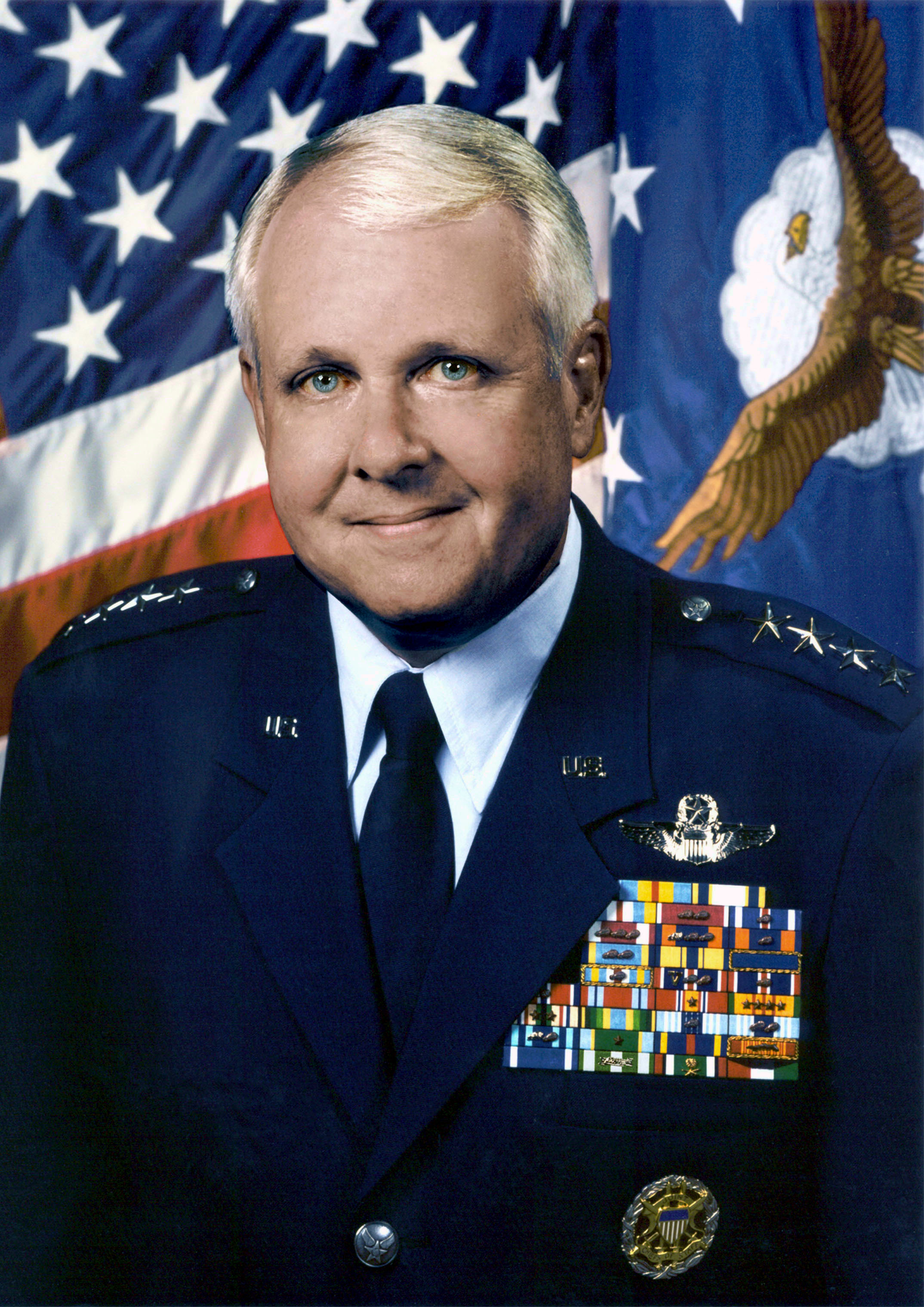
Hal M. Hornburg, former U.S. Air Force general

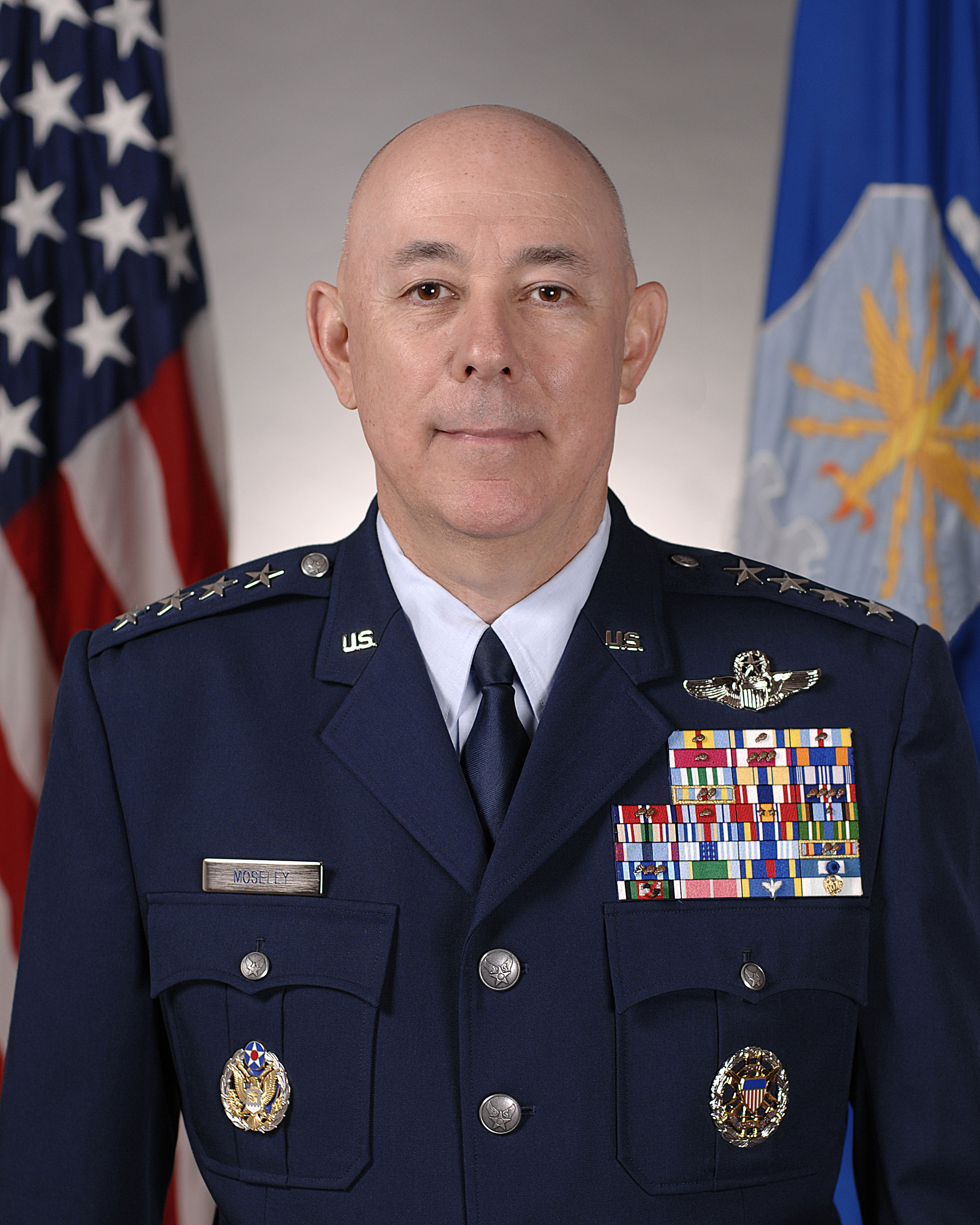
T. Michael Moseley, former U.S. Air Force general

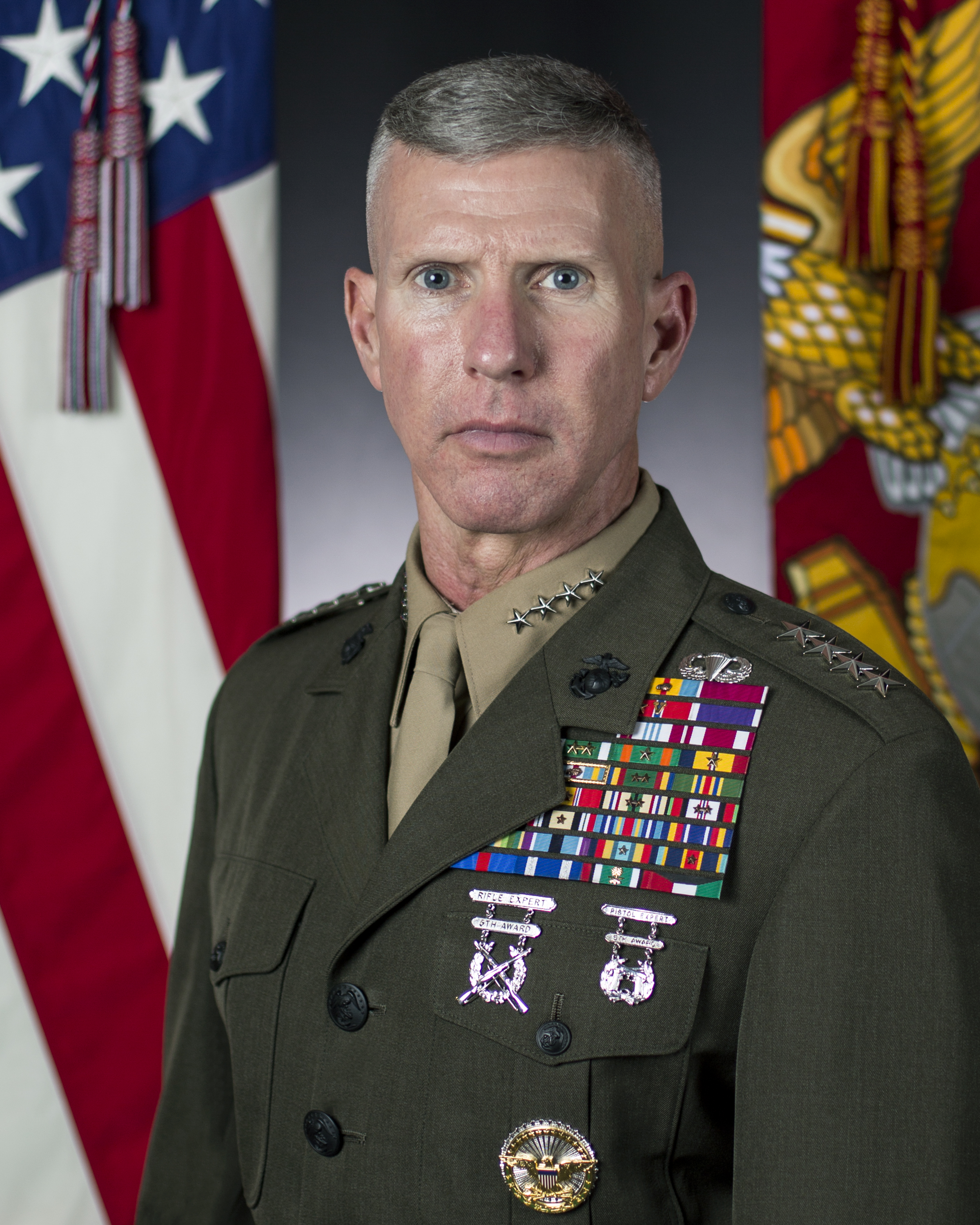
Eric M. Smith, 39th commandant of the Marine Corps

=== Arts ===
==== Art and architecture ====
Name	Class year	Notability	References
Nestor Bottino	1977	Architect and partner at Holzman Moss Bottino Architecture	
Thomas Bredlow		Master blacksmith who was involved with the ironwork revival in the American southwest during the mid- to late 20th century	
Harold Dow Bugbee	1921	Artist	
Louis Daeuble Jr.	1932	Architect of the Sun Bowl Stadium and El Paso Museum of Art	
Keith Ferris		Aviation artist	
Randal Ford	2004	photographer and portraitist	
Preston Geren Jr.	1945	Architect and 2007 Distinguished Alumnus	
Preston Geren Sr.	1912	Architect and civil engineer	
Frank Malina	1934	Aeronautical engineer and artist	
Scott Mitchell	1966	Architectural designer and author, known for his architectural constructions for celebrities	
Adrian Smith	1966	Architect of the world's tallest structure, Burj Khalifa	
Gene Summers	1949	Architect of Seagram Building, Mies van der Rohe's right-hand man	
Arch Swank Jr.	1936	Architect of the Little Chapel in the Woods, Parkland Memorial Hospital and the Texas Instruments Headquarters	
Bryan Trubey	1983	Architect who contributions include Globe Life Field, American Airlines Center, AT&T Stadium, U.S. Bank Stadium, Lucas Oil Stadium, and SoFi Stadium	
Pete Tumlinson		Comic book artist whose works include Kid Colt. Originator of the Ol' Sarge cartoon character	
Margaret Ann Withers	2003	Artist and poet	

==== Film, television, and theater ====
Name	Class year	Notability	References
Richard Bradford		Actor best known for his roles in the TV show Man in a Suitcase and movie The Untouchables	
Brittany Broski	2018	Comedian, social media personality; known for the "Kombucha Girl" meme, appearing on Trixie Motel, and her podcast The Broski Report	
Mary Beth Decker	2003	Actress and model; former cast member of MTV's Road Rules and Road Rules: South Pacific	
Ty Hardin	1959	Actor, star of TV series Bronco	
Greg Kwedar	2008	Directed the Oscar-nominated 2023 film Sing Sing; co-wrote the screenplay for 2025 Oscar-nominated film Train Dreams	
Martha Madison	1999	Actress best known as Belle Black on Days of Our Lives	
Tim McCanlies		Filmmaker, directed Secondhand Lions and wrote screenplay for The Iron Giant	
Tanya McQueen		Actress	
Marc Menchaca	1994	Actor in Homeland, Ozark and The Outsider	
Thomas Miles		Comedian better Known as "Nephew Tommy"	
Ilan Mitchell-Smith		Actor in Journey to the Center of the Earth	
Al Reinert	1970	Journalist, film director, screenwriter and producer best known for co-writing the screenplays for Apollo 13 and Final Fantasy: The Spirits Within as well as directing and producing For All Mankind	
Tiffany Thornton		Actress known for her role as Tawni in Sonny With a Chance	
Rip Torn	1952	Oscar-nominated and Emmy-winning actor, films including Men in Black, The Cincinnati Kid, Defending Your Life, Cross Creek, Down Periscope, and television series The Larry Sanders Show	
Dusty Wolfe	2012	Former professional wrestler with the WWF, WCW, WCCW, and NWA territories	
Shobu Yarlagadda	1994	Indian film producer, co-founder and CEO of Arka Mediaworks	

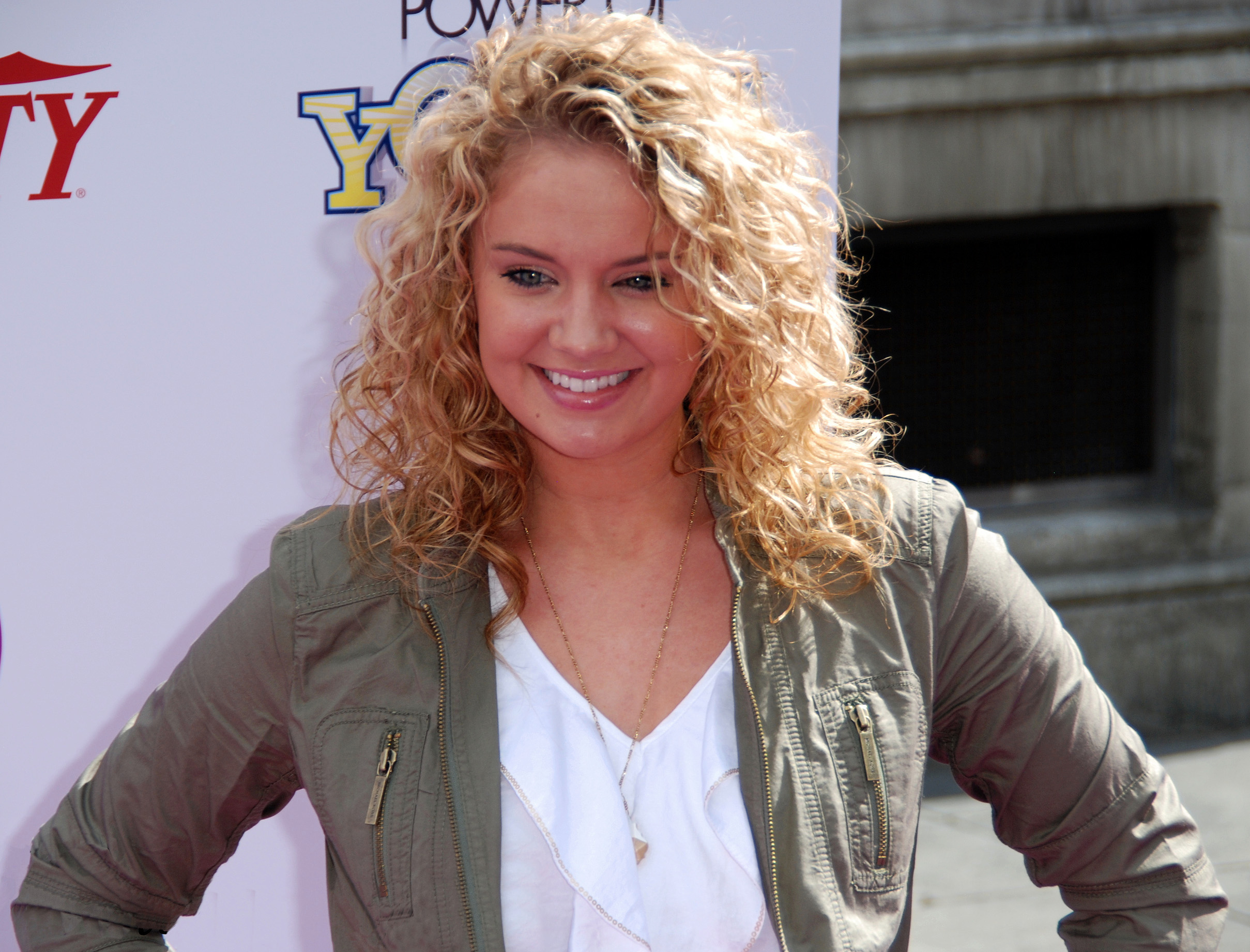
Tiffany Thornton

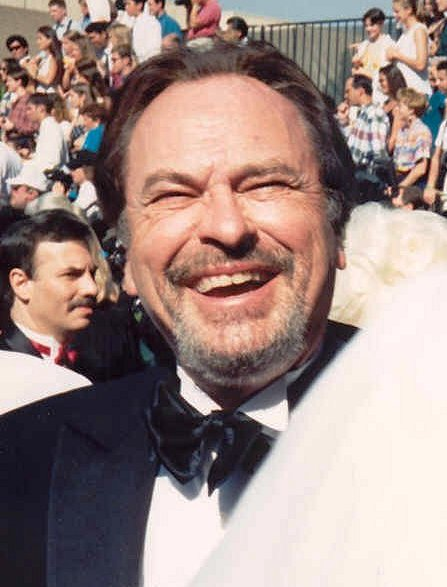
Rip Torn at the 47th Emmy Awards

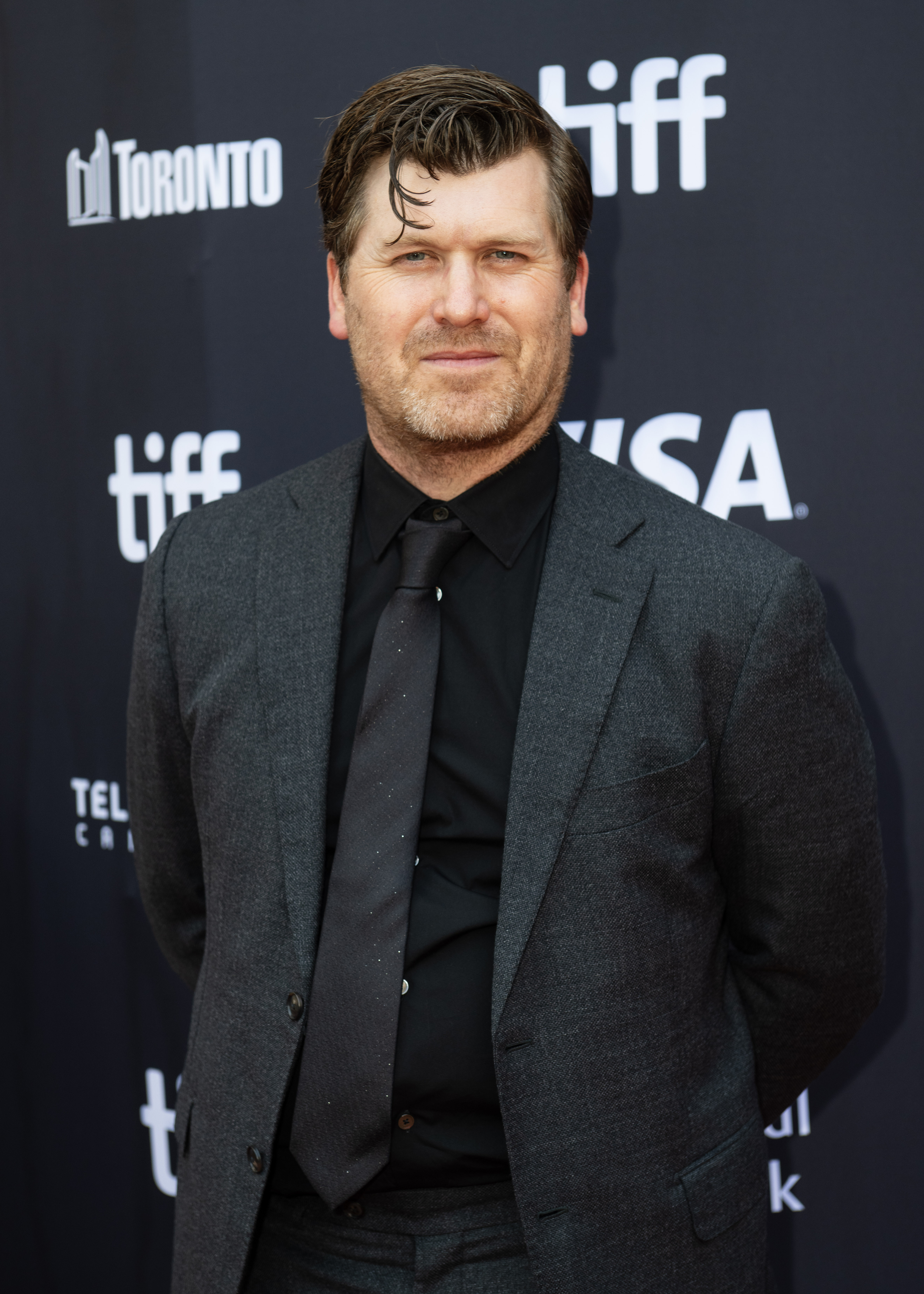
Greg Kwedar at the 2025 Toronto International Film Festival

==== Internet and content creators ====
Name	Class year	Notability	References
Coffeezilla	2016	YouTuber and cryptocurrency journalist	
Grady Hillhouse	2012	Civil Engineer best known for his YouTube channel Practical Engineering	
Kayce Smith	2012	Podcast host for Barstool Sports	
Tyler Toney	2011	Co-founder and on-screen member of the sports and comedy group Dude Perfect	
Ryan Trahan		Co-owner of Joyride Sweets	

==== Journalism and literature ====
Name	Class year	Notability	References
Kathi Appelt	1979	Children's literature author	
Neal Boortz	1967	Libertarian radio personality and host of The Neal Boortz Show	
Coffeezilla	2016	YouTuber and cryptocurrency journalist	
Richard L. Cox	1992	Author	
Geralyn Dawson		Romance novelist	
Penny De Los Santos	1994	culinary photographer, a senior contributor to Saveur Magazine, and a co-author of or a contributor to more than a dozen food and culture books	
HolLynn D'Lil		Disabilities rights activist, writer and photographer; best known for photographing and participating in the 1977 "Section 504 sit-ins"	
Dan Flores	Pre-1980	Historian of the American West at University of Montana at Missoula	
Steven Gould		Science-fiction author	
Patricia Gras	1983	CBS television anchor and Emmy Award winner	
Payne Harrison		Author	
Jerry B. Lincecum		Emeritus professor of English and author, affiliated with Austin College in Sherman, Texas	
Russell Lutz		Science-fiction author	
Roland Martin	1991	CNN journalist	
Melinda Murphy	1986	The Early Show correspondent and Emmy Award winner	
Lou Halsell Rodenberger		Scholar of women writers	
Steven Romo		NBC News anchor, correspondent and writer	
Martha Wells	1986	Fantasy and science-fiction author	
Lowell Mick White		Fiction writer	
Gene Wolfe		Science-fiction author	

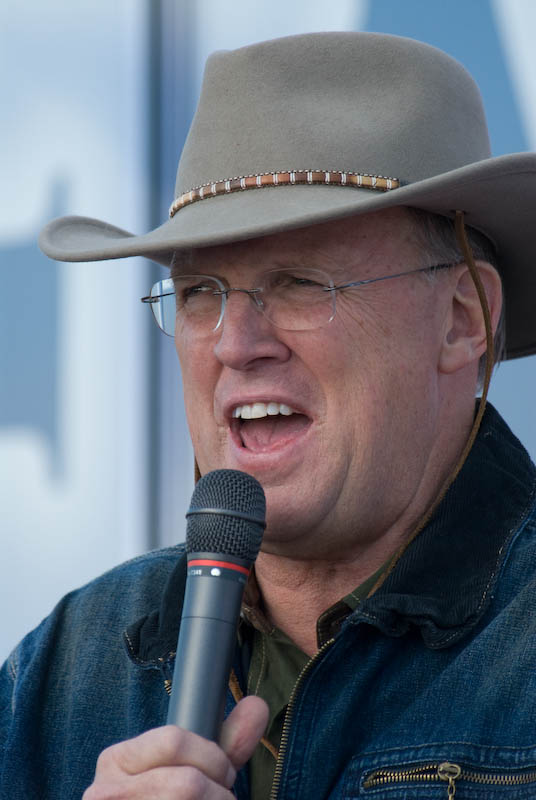
Neal Boortz

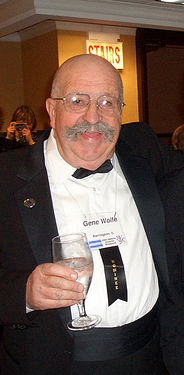
Gene Wolfe

==== Music ====
Name	Class year	Notability	References
Shane Barnard	1998	Christian musician	
Jason Castro	2008	American Idol contestant	
Roger Creager	1993	Country musician	
Shane Everett	1993	Christian musician	
Robert Earl Keen	1978	Country musician	
Lyle Lovett	1979	Country musician; four-time Grammy Award winner	
Jimmy Needham	2007	Christian musician	
Jordan Powell	2006	music manager and record producer	
Aiden Ross		Pop musician, winner of Season 28 of The Voice	
Granger Smith	2002	Country musician	
Chris Tomlin	1994	Christian musician	
Rick Trevino	1994	Country musician; Grammy Award winner	

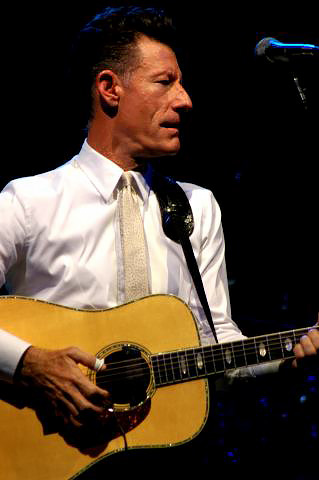
Lyle Lovett

==== Pageantry ====
Name	Class year	Notability	References
Carissa Blair	1996	Miss Texas USA (1999); Miss Texas Teen USA (1992)	
Lisa Dalzell	2001	Miss Texas (2002)	
Kandace Krueger	2002	Miss USA (2001)	
Sherri Ryman		Miss Texas (1981)	
Kimberly Tomes		Miss USA (1976); Miss Universe finalist	

=== Business ===
Name	Class year	Notability	References
Arch "Beaver" Aplin III	1980	Founder and CEO of Buc-ee's	
Michael Bonsignore	1969	Former chairman and chief executive officer of Honeywell	
Harvey "Bum" Bright	1943	Former owner of the Dallas Cowboys	
Bruce Broussard	1984	Former chairman & CEO of Humana	
Patrick Conway	1996	CEO of Optum	
David Cordani	1988	President, CEO, and chairman of The Cigna Group	
David Duncan	1980	Arthur Andersen partner-in-charge of Enron account during the Enron Scandal	
Khalid Al-Falih	1982	Former CEO and current chairman of the board of Saudi Aramco	
Joe Foster	1957	Founder and former CEO of Newfield Exploration; Former Chairman of Tenneco Oil Company; and former chairman of the NPC	
Greg Garland	1980	Former chairman & CEO of Phillips 66	
Marvin Girouard	1961	Former chief executive officer of Pier 1 Imports	
Britt Harris	1980	Chief investment officer of the Teacher Retirement System of Texas; former chief executive officer of Bridgewater Associates	
Stephen Hayes	1972	President emeritus of Corporate Council on Africa	
Bob Jordan	1985	CEO of Southwest Airlines	
Mavis Kelsey	1932	Original partner of Kelsey-Seybold Clinic	
Chakib Khelil	1968	Algerian minister for energy and mines; former president of Sonatrach and OPEC	
Chase Koch	2000	Son of Charles Koch and president of Koch Fertilizer, a subsidiary of Koch Industries	
Rita LeBlanc	2001	Owner and executive vice president of the New Orleans Saints	
Ketil Lenning	1974	Former CEO of Odfjell Drilling	
Denis Machuel	1988	CEO of The Adecco Group	
Lowry Mays	1957	Co-founder of Clear Channel Communications	
Jeff Miller	1988	President, CEO, and Chairman of Halliburton	
George P. Mitchell	1940	Founder and former chief executive officer of Mitchell Energy and Development (subsequently acquired by Devon Energy); pioneer of fracking; real estate developer	
T. Boone Pickens	1951	Business magnate and financier	
Noel Wallace	1987	Chairman and CEO of Colgate-Palmolive	
Anthony Wood	1988	Founder of Roku, Inc.	
Darren Woods	1987	Chairman & CEO of ExxonMobil	
Oscar Wyatt	1949	Founder and former chairman and chief executive officer of Coastal States Gas Producing Company (now Coastal Corporation)	
Henry Bartell "Pat" Zachry	1922	Founder and former president and chairman of Zachry Construction Corporation	

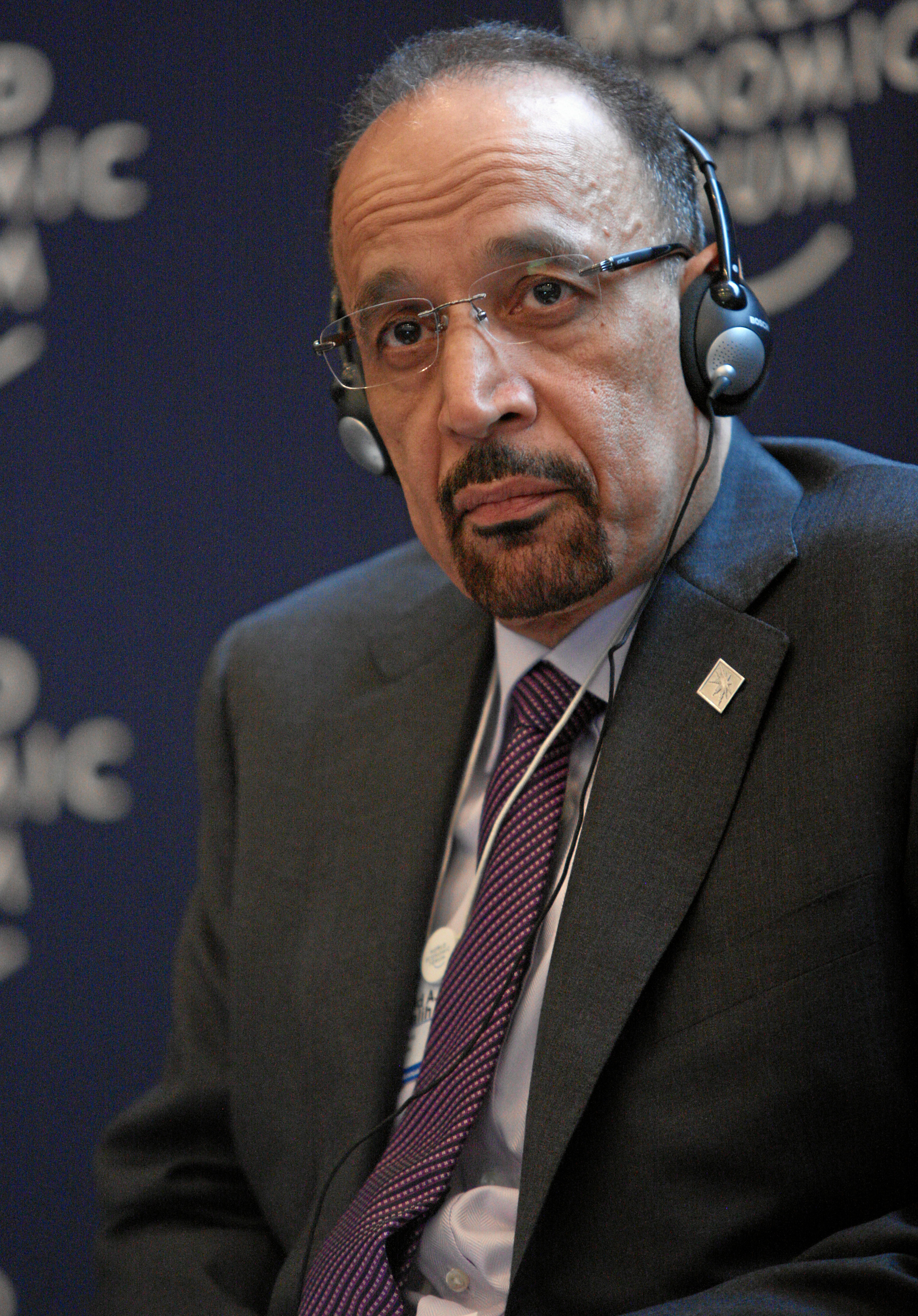
Khalid Al-Falih, chairman of the board of directors of Saudi Aramco

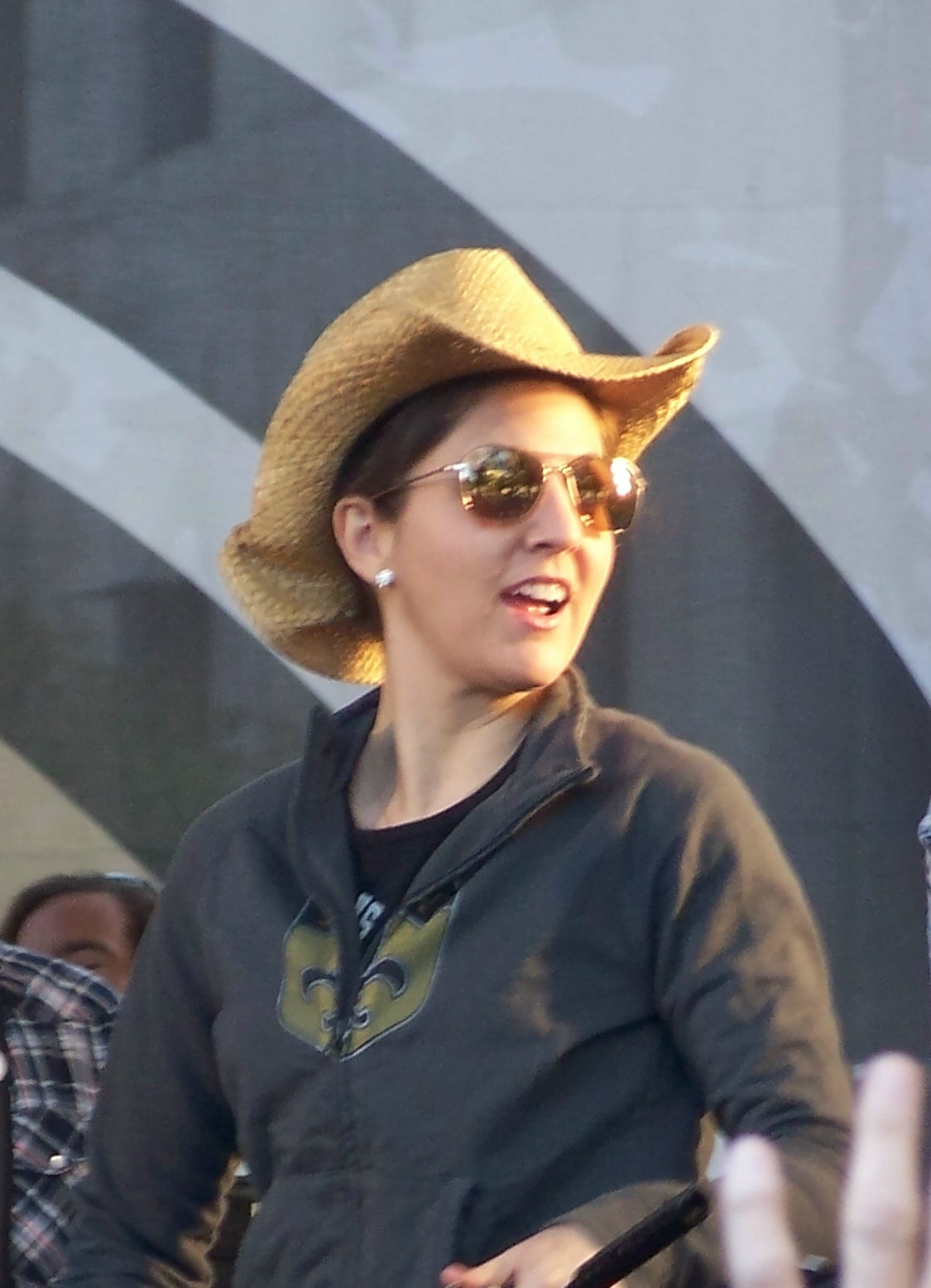
Rita LeBlanc, daughter of New Orleans Saints owner

=== College presidents ===
Name	Class year	Notability	References
Stuart R. Bell	1979	14th and current president of the University of Florida	
A.D. Bruce	1916	3rd president of the University of Houston; former U.S. Army major general; founded Fort Hood	
Jimmy Cheek		7th chancellor of the University of Tennessee, Knoxville	
Lesia L. Crumpton-Young	1988	13th president of the Texas Southern University	
Robert Easter	1970	19th president of the University of Illinois System	
Lawrence E. Fouraker	1944	6th dean of Harvard Business School	
Les Guice	1986	14th president of Louisiana Tech University	
Donald R. Haragan		12th president of Texas Tech University	
Maria Hernandez Ferrier		1st president of Texas A&M University–San Antonio; former advisor to the U.S. secretary of education on bilingual education	
Giancarlo Ibarguen	1985	Former president of the Universidad Francisco Marroquín	
Michael R. Lane	1980	15th president of Emporia State University	
R. Bowen Loftin	1971	24th president of Texas A&M University; former vice president and chief executive officer of Texas A&M University at Galveston	
Alvin Luedecke	1932	Former acting president of Texas A&M University	
Juan L. Maldonado	Attended 1967–1970 with studies in engineering	Former president of Laredo Community College	
Taylor Marshall	1999	Former chancellor of the College of Saints John Fisher & Thomas More	
Wendell Nedderman	1949	4th president of the University of Texas at Arlington	
G. P. "Bud" Peterson	1985	11th president of Georgia Institute of Technology	
Javier Reyes		13th and current Chancellor of the University of Massachusetts Amherst	
Peter Rodriguez		15th and current President of Wake Forest University	
James Earl Rudder	1932	Former U.S. Army major general; 16th president of Texas A&M University	
Lawrence Schovanec		17th president of Texas Tech University	
Michael Tan	1977	10th chancellor of the University of the Philippines Diliman	

=== Criminal activity ===
Name	Class year	Notability	References
Eduardo Castro-Wright	1975	Former vice chairman of Wal-Mart Stores, Inc; key figure in the U.S. government's probe into Wal-Mart's Mexican bribery allegations	
David Duncan	1981	Lead audit partner on Enron for Arthur Andersen	
Wen Ho Lee	1969	Nuclear researcher indicted on 59 counts by a federal grand jury for stealing U.S. nuclear arsenal secrets for China	

=== Government and politics ===
==== Heads of state ====
Name	Class year	Notability	References
Jorge F. Quiroga-Ramirez	1981	62nd president of Bolivia	
Martin Torrijos	1987	35th president of Panama	

==== U.S. cabinet secretaries ====
Name	Class year	Notability	References
Henry Cisneros	1968	10th U.S. secretary of Housing and Urban Development; first Hispanic mayor of a major U.S. city (San Antonio)	
Rick Perry	1972	14th U.S. secretary of energy, former governor of Texas; former Texas House of Representatives member	
Brooke Rollins	1994	33rd U.S. secretary of agriculture	
Marvin Runyon	1948	70th United States postmaster general	

==== U.S. federal judges ====
Name	Class year	Notability	References
J. Campbell Barker	2002	U.S. District Court, Eastern District of Texas	
James DeAnda	1948	Former U.S. federal judge; attorney in Hernandez v. Texas	
Simeon Timothy "Sim" Lake III	1966	U. S. District Court, Southern District of Texas	
Mark T. Pittman	1996	U.S. District Court, Northern District of Texas	
Drew B. Tipton	1990	U. S. District Court, Southern District of Texas	

==== U.S. state governors ====
Name	Class year	Notability	References
Aaron Ford	1994	32nd Governor of Nevada	
Rick Perry	1972	47th Governor of Texas	
Frank D. White	1956	41st Governor of Arkansas	

==== U.S. House of Representatives members ====
Name	Class year	Notability	References
Joe L. Barton	1972	Former U.S. House of Representatives member and ranking member for Texas's 6th district	
Carlos Bee		Former United States House of Representatives member for Texas's 14th district	
Earle Cabell	1929	Former United States House of Representatives member for Texas's 5th district; former mayor of Dallas	
Chet Edwards	1974	Former United States House of Representatives member for Texas's 11th district & 17th district	
Bill Flores	1976	Former United States House of Representatives member for Texas's 17th district	
Chris Gober	2001	Current United States House of Representatives member for Texas's 10th district	
Louie Gohmert	1975	Former United States House of Representatives member for Texas's 1st district	
Jeb Hensarling	1979	Former United States House of Representatives member for Texas's 5th district	
Will Hurd	2000	Former United States House of Representatives member for Texas's 23rd district	
Ronny Jackson	1991	Current United States House of Representatives member for Texas's 13th district, Former Physician to the President	
Dan Kuykendall	1947	Former United States House of Representatives member for Tennessee's 9th district & 8th district	
Greg Laughlin	1964	Former United States House of Representatives member for Texas's 14th district	
Walter Lineberger		Former United States House of Representatives member for California's 9th district	
John Matthew Moore	1880	Former United States House of Representatives member, grandfather of Hilmar Mooremember for Texas's 8th district	
Graham Purcell Jr.	1946	Former United States House of Representatives member for Texas's 13th district	
Joe R. Skeen	1960	Former United States House of Representatives member for New Mexico's 2nd district	
Olin E. Teague	1932	Former United States House of Representatives member for Texas's 6th district	
Eugene Worley	1928	Former United States House of Representatives member for Texas's 18th district, chief judge of the United States Court of Customs and Patent Appeals	

==== U.S. ambassadors and foreign political figures ====
Name	Class year	Notability	References
Oscar Alvarez	1982	Former minister of public security for Honduras	
Wally Brewster	1983	Former U.S. ambassador to the Dominican Republic	
Mostafa Chamran	1959	3rd Defense minister of Iran, member of parliament	
Chen Chi-chung	1999	1st Taiwanese Minister of Agriculture	
Mohamad Khalid Dimaporo	2004	7th & 9th Governor of Lanao del Norte, Philippines	
Chakib Khelil	1968	Algerian minister for energy and mines; former president of Sonatrach and OPEC	
Edwin Jackson Kyle	1899	Former U.S. ambassador to Guatemala; namesake of Kyle Field	
Larry C. Napper	1969	Former U.S. ambassador to Kazakhstan and Latvia	

==== State Upper House members ====
Name	Class year	Notability	References
Trent Ashby	1996	Texas senator	
Paul Bettencourt	1980	Texas senator, former Majority Leader of the Texas senate	
J. Searcy Bracewell, Jr.	1938	Former Texas senator; former President pro tempore of the Texas Senate; former Texas House of Representatives member	
Chet Edwards	1974	Former Texas senator; United States House of Representatives member	
Pete Flores	1983	Texas senator	
Glenn Hegar	1993	Former Texas senator, Texas comptroller of Public Accounts	
Wally Horn		Former Iowa senator	
Jana Hughes	1993	Member of the Nebraska Legislature	
John D. Johnson	1987	Utah senator	
Brett Ligon		Texas senator	
William T. Moore	1940	Former Texas senator; former President pro tempore of the Texas Senate	
Steve Ogden	1987	Former Texas senator	
Jerry E. Patterson	1969	Former Texas senator; 27th commissioner of the General Land office of Texas	
Floyd Prozanski	1977	Oregon senator	
Bryce Reeves	1989	Virginia senator	
A.R. Schwartz	1948	Former Texas senator; former President pro tempore of the Texas Senate	
Todd Staples	1984	Former Texas senator; 11th commissioner of the Texas Department of Agriculture	
Mike Thompson		Mississippi senator	
Jeff Wentworth	1962	Former Texas senator	
Tommy Williams	1978	Former Texas senator; former Texas House of Representatives member	
Max Wise	2008	Kentucky senator; Majority Leader of the Kentucky senate; former FBI agent	

==== State Lower House members ====
Name	Class year	Notability	References
Charles "Doc" Anderson		Former member of the Texas House of Representatives	
Trent Ashby	1996	Former Member of the Texas House of Representatives	
Dwayne Bohac		Former member of the Texas House of Representatives	
Greg Bonnen	1988	Member of the Texas House of Representatives; Neurosurgeon and medical professor at University of Texas Medical Branch	
J. Searcy Bracewell, Jr.	1938	Former Texas House of Representatives member; former Texas senator	
Brad Buckley	1993	Texas House of Representatives member	
Ernest Bailes	2004	Former Texas House of Representatives member	
Bill W. Clayton	1950	Former speaker of the Texas House of Representatives	
Myra Crownover		Former member of the Texas House of Representatives; former Majority leader of the Texas House	
Pat Curry	1987	Member of the Texas House of Representatives	
John Cyrier	1995	Former member of the Texas House of Representatives	
Dawnna Dukes		Former member of the Texas House of Representatives	
Paul Dyson	2002	Member of the Texas House of Representatives	
James B. Frank	1989	Member of the Texas House of Representatives	
Anita Gonzales	2002	Member of the New Mexico House of Representatives	
Ryan Guillen	2000	Member of the Texas House of Representatives	
Cody Harris	2006	Member of the Texas House of Representatives	
Brian Harrison	2004	Member of the Texas House of Representatives	
Richard Hayes	1976	Member of the Texas House of Representatives	
Venton Jones	2006	Member of the Texas House of Representatives	
Kyle Kacal	1992	Former member of the Texas House of Representatives	
Tracy O. King	1983	Former member of the Texas House of Representatives	
Stan Kitzman	1988	Former member of the Texas House of Representatives	
Glenn Kothmann	1950	Former member of the Texas House of Representatives	
Brooks landgraf	2003	Member of the Texas House of Representatives	
Lyle Larson	1981	Former member of the Texas House of Representatives	
Samantha Lopez-Resendez	2017	Member of the Texas House of Representatives	
Gabriel Moreno	2007	Member of the Maryland House of Delegates	
Rick Noriega		Former member of the Texas House of Representatives	
Angelia Orr	1992	Member of the Texas House of Representatives	
Solomon Ortiz	1999	Former member of the Texas House of Representatives	
Jared Patterson	2005	Member of the Texas House of Representatives	
Rick Perry	1972	Former member of the Texas House of Representatives; former governor of Texas; former U.S. secretary of energy	
Marianne Proctor	1990	Member of the Kentucky House of Representatives	
John N. Raney	1969	Former member of the Texas House of Representatives	
Keresa Richardson	1980	Member of the Texas House of Representatives	
Glenn Rogers		Former member of the Texas House of Representatives	
Dan Scott	1987	1st African-american Speaker of the Virginia House of Delegates, member of the Virginia House of Delegates	
Mark M. Shelton	1983	Former member of the Texas House of Representatives	
David Smith	1982	Member of the Florida House of Representatives	
Todd Staples	1984	Former Texas House of Representatives member; commissioner of the Texas Department of Agriculture; former Texas senator	
Randy Torres	1993	Memder of the Arkansas House of Representatives	
Cody Vasut	2009	Member of the Texas House of Representatives	
Mike Villarreal	1993	Former member of the Texas House of Representatives	
Jeff Wentworth	1962	Former Texas House of Representatives member; former Texas senator	
Tommy Williams	1978	Former Texas House of Representatives member; former Texas senator	
Terry Wilson	1988	Member of the Texas House of Representatives	
John Wray	1993	Former member of the Texas House of Representatives; former mayor of Waxahachie	
Gene Wu	2000	Minority leader of the Texas House of Representatives; member of the Texas House of Representatives	

==== Metropolitan mayors ====
Name	Class year	Notability	References
Bob Bolen	1948	40th and Longest-serving mayor of Fort Worth, Texas (1982–1991)	
Earle Cabell	1929	48th mayor of Dallas	
Henry Cisneros	1968	173rd mayor of San Antonio; 1st Hispanic mayor of a major United States city	
Ed Garza	1992	178th mayor of San Antonio	
Amir Omar	1996	Mayor of Richardson	
Will Wynn	1984	56th mayor of Austin	

==== NASA ====
Name	Class year	Notability	References
Aaron Cohen	1952	Former acting administrator of NASA	
George Deutsch	2003	Former NASA press officer	
Michael E. Fossum	1980	NASA astronaut (STS-121 and STS-124)	
Gerald D. Griffin	1956	Former director of the Lyndon B. Johnson Space Center	
Bryan Lunney	1989	NASA flight director	
William A. Pailes	1981	NASA astronaut (STS-51-J)	
Marc Reagan	1989	Station Training Lead in Mission Operations at Johnson Space Center	
Holly Ridings	1996	Former chief flight director at NASA; first woman to hold position	
Steven Swanson	1998	NASA astronaut (STS-117 and STS-119)	
Dana Weigel	1993	Flight director at NASA	

==== National political figures ====
Name	Class year	Notability	References
Israel Hernandez	1999	Assistant secretary of commerce and director-general of United States Commercial Service	
Aaron Lukas	1993	7th Principal deputy director of National Intelligence	
Ronny Jackson	1991	1st Chief Medical Advisor to the President; 24th Physician to the President; current member of the United States House of Representatives	
Bill Read	1971	Former director of the National Hurricane Center	
Jack Ward Thomas	1957	13th chief of United States Forest Service	
James Trainor III	1997	Former Chair of the Federal Election Commission	
Francis Turner	1929	Developer of U.S. Interstate Highway System and Federal Highway administrator	

==== State political figures ====
Name	Class year	Notability	References
Paul Bettencourt	c. 1980	Member of the Texas State Senate from District 7 in Houston, effective January 2015; former Harris County tax assessor-collector	
John A. Brieden	1972	National commander of the American Legion 2003–2004; judge of Washington County, Texas	
Reagan V. Brown	1943	7th Agriculture Commissioner of Texas	
Greg Coleman	1987	1st solicitor general of Texas	
Glenn Hegar	1993	38th Texas comptroller of Public Accounts; 15th and current chancellor of the Texas A&M University System	
Garry Mauro	1970	25th commissioner of the Texas General Land Office	
Don McLeroy	1968	President of the Texas State Board of Education	
Tom Mechler		Texas Republican Party state chairman since 2015; oil and gas consultant in Amarillo	
Jerry E. Patterson	1969	27th Texas land commissioner	
Jack Rains		95th Secretary of State of Texas	
C. L. Ray Jr.	1952	Former Justice of the Supreme Court of Texas	
Brooke Rollins	1994	Former president of the Texas Public Policy Foundation	
John Sharp	1972	35th Texas comptroller of Public Accounts; 14th chancellor of the Texas A&M University System	
Ryan Sitton	1998	Texas railroad commissioner	
Barry Smitherman		Texas railroad commissioner	
Clayton Williams	1954	1990 Republican Texas gubernatorial nominee	

==== Legal figures ====
Name / Class year / Notability / References; Tony Buzbee / 1997 / Celebrity lawyer

=== Religion & Philosophy ===
Name	Class year	Notability	References
Goodrich R. Fenner	1913	5th Bishop of the Episcopal Diocese of Kansas	
Todd Ousley	1984	Provisional Bishop of the Episcopal Diocese of Wyoming; 2nd Bishop of the Episcopal Diocese of Eastern Michigan	
Ryan Reed	1989	4th Bishop of the Episcopal Diocese of Fort Worth	
Ryan Stawaisz	2011	Catholic priest and subject of the film Love God's Will: The True Story of Fr. Ryan Stawaisz	

=== Science and technology ===
Name	Class year	Notability	References
Mark Benden	1990	Director of the Center for Worker Health at Texas A&M; elected to the National Academy of Inventors in 2023	
James R. Biard	1954	Inventor who held 73 U.S. patents; elected to the National Academy of Engineering in 1991	
Meryl C. Broussard	1980	Aquaculture	
Thomas Camp	1916	Sanitary engineer and founder of CDM Smith	
James Henry "Red" Duke	1950	Trauma surgeon and founder of the Memorial Hermann Life Flight program	
Leroy S. Fletcher	1958	104th president of the American Society of Mechanical Engineers and was recipient of the 2002 ASME Medal.	
Steven C. Hackett	1986	Environmental and natural resource economist	
Michael T. Halbouty	1930	Winner of the Hoover Medal; wildcatter	
Mavis Kelsey	1932	Co-founder of the Kelsey-Seybold Clinic	
Edward F. Knipling	1930	Entomologist; 1966 National Medal of Science winner; listed in Esquire as one of the "100 Most Important People in the World" in 1970	
Douglas A. Lawson	1969	Paleontologist, discovered Quetzalcoatlus as a graduate student	
Maurice Lukefahr	1961	Researcher in plant resistance to insect pests	
Frank Malina	1934	Aeronautical engineer and artist; second director of the Jet Propulsion Laboratory	
Marilyn Masson	1982	Archeologist, focused on Ancient Mesoamerican cultures	
Glenn McCarthy	1931	Wildcatter	
Jerry Merryman		Co-inventor of the hand-held calculator	
Charles Munnerlyn	1962	Optical engineer who constructed the first working excimer laser system for vision correction, founder of VISX, Inc.	
Richard Steadman	1959	Knee surgeon	
Gordon Walton	1981	Video game developer	
Terry Yates	1975	Biologist and academic, credited with discovering the source of the hantavirus in the American Southwest in 1993	

== Faculty and affiliates ==
=== Nobel Prize laureates ===
Name	Department	Notability	References
Derek Barton	Chemistry	1969 Nobel laureate in Chemistry	
Norman Borlaug	Soil and Crop Sciences	One of five people in history to have won the Presidential Medal of Freedom and the Congressional Gold Medal; Nobel Peace Prize winner 1970	
Sheldon Glashow	Physics	1979 Nobel laureate in Physics	
Robert H. Grubbs	Chemistry	1995 Nobel laureate in Chemistry	
Dudley R. Herschbach	Physics	1986 Nobel laureate in Chemistry	
Jack Kilby	Electrical engineering	2000 Nobel laureate in Physics; National Medal of Science winner	
David Lee	Physics	1996 Nobel laureate in Physics	
Vernon L. Smith	Institute for Advanced Study	2002 Nobel Prize in Economics	

=== Academia ===
==== College presidents ====
Name	Department	Notability	References
William Bizzell		5th president of the University of Oklahoma and former Texas A&M University	
Robert Gates	George Bush School of Government and Public Service	22nd president of Texas A&M University; 22nd United States secretary of defense	
David Franklin Houston	Political science	5th United States secretary of agriculture and 48th United States secretary of the treasury; 8th chancellor of the Washington University in St. Louis; 4th president of the University of Texas at Austin and 6th president of Texas A&M University	
Elsa Murano	Nutrition and Food Services	23rd president of Texas A&M University; former United States under secretary of agriculture for food safety	
Lawrence Sullivan Ross	-	19th governor of Texas; Civil War general; 4th president of Texas A&M University	
Frank Vandiver	History	Former president of Rice University, Texas A&M University, and University of North Texas	

==== Professors and scholars ====
Name	Department	Notability	References
Terry Alfriend	Aerospace engineering	Aerospace engineer	
Allen J. Bard	n/a	Recipient of the Priestley Medal and Wolf Prize in Chemistry	
F. Albert Cotton	Chemistry	Recipient of the Priestley Medal and Wolf Prize in Chemistry	
Kim Yi Dionne	Political Science	Political scientist	
Joe Feagin	Sociology	Pulitzer Prize-nominated author	
John Hope Franklin	n/a	Presidential Medal of Freedom recipient	
Melissa Grunlan	Biomedical Engineering	Holder of the Charles H. and Bettye Barclay Professorship	
Kenneth R. Hall	Chemical engineering	Chemical engineer	
Rebecca Hankins	n/a	Librarian/curator, Africana and Women's and Gender Studies; presidential appointee to the National Historical Publications and Records Commission	
Eli Jones	Marketing	Business school dean	
John Junkins	Aerospace Engineering	Founding director, Hagler Institute for Advanced Study, Distinguished Professor, member of National Academy of Engineering	
Arnold Krammer	History	Two-time Fulbright scholar; two-time TAMU "Distinguished Achievement Award" recipient; specialist in German and United States studies; on faculty, 1974-retirement in 2015	
John J. McDermott	Philosophy	University Distinguished Professor, philosopher, past president of the William James Society	
Gerald North	Atmospheric Science	The North Report Tropical Rain Measuring Mission	
Roderic I. Pettigrew		physicist, engineer, and physician; founding director of the National Institute of Biomedical Imaging and Bioengineering (NIBIB) at the National Institutes of Health (NIH)	
Dudley L. Poston, Jr.		Professor of Sociology and Demography	
Morgan Reynolds		Former chief economist for the U.S. Department of Labor	
Venkatesh Shankar	Business	Marketing scholar; namesake of the Shankar-Spiegel Award	
Paul P. Van Riper	Political Science	Namesake of the ASPA Paul P. Van Riper Award	

=== Armed forces ===
Name	Department	Notability	References
Edward C. Aldridge, Jr.	1960	16th U.S. secretary of the Air Force	
Silas L. Copeland		Former sergeant major of the Army	
Mark Welsh	Bush School of Government and Public Service	20th chief of staff of the United States Air Force	

=== Government and politics ===
==== Heads of state ====
Name / Department / Notability / References; George H. W. Bush / The Bush School of Government and Public Service / 41st president of the United States; namesake of The Bush School of Government and Public Service and George Bush Presidential Library housed at Texas A&M University

==== U.S. cabinet secretaries ====
Name	Department	Notability	References
Robert Gates		22nd United States secretary of defense; 22nd Texas A&M University president	
David Franklin Houston		5th United States secretary of agriculture and 48th United States secretary of the treasury; 8th chancellor of the Washington University in St. Louis; 4th president of The University of Texas at Austin and 6th President of Texas A&M University	

==== U.S. state governors ====
Name / Department / Notability / References; Lawrence Sullivan Ross / / 19th governor of Texas, Civil War general, and 4th president of Texas A&M University

==== U.S. senators ====
Name / Department / Notability / References; Phil Gramm / Economics / Former United States senator

==== U.S. ambassadors and foreign political figures ====
Name	Department	Notability	References
Ryan Crocker	Bush School of Government and Public Service	Former ambassador to Afghanistan, Iraq, Pakistan, Syria, Kuwait, and Lebanon; former dean of The Bush School of Government and Public Service	
Mozah bint Nasser Al Missned		Consort to the emir of the State of Qatar; chairman of the Qatar Foundation for Education, Science, and Community Development	
Sally Shelton-Colby		Former ambassador of the United States to Barbados, Dominica, and Grenada	

==== National political figures ====
Name	Department	Notability	References
Andrew Card	The Bush School of Government and Public Service	White House chief of staff to President George W. Bush; former dean of The Bush School of Government and Public Service	
Elsa Murano		United States under secretary of Agriculture for Food Safety; former president of Texas A&M University	

==== State political figures ====
Name / Department / Notability / References; John Nielsen-Gammon / / Texas state climatologist

=== Journalism and literature ===
Name	Department	Notability	References
Joe Feagin	Liberal Arts	Pulitzer Prize nominee	
Charles Gordone	Theater Arts	1970 Pulitzer Prize recipient	
Robert Sherrill	Liberal Arts	Investigative journalist	

=== Science and technology ===
Name	Department	Notability	References
Perry L. Adkisson		Wolf Prize winner; World Food Prize winner	
George Bass	Institute of Nautical Archaeology	National Medal of Science winner; founder of the Institute of Nautical Archaeology.	
Richard H. Battin		applied mathematician and engineer; led the design of the Apollo Guidance Computer during the Apollo missions	
Fuller W. Bazer	Animal Science	Wolf Prize winner	
Karen Butler-Purry	Engineering	professor, Department of Electrical and Computer Engineering	
Robert Byron Bird	Engineering	1987 National Medal of Science winner	
Gregory Chamitoff	Engineering	Engineer and former NASA astronaut	
F. Albert Cotton	Chemestry	National Medal of Science Laureate in Chemistry; Wolf Prize winner; Priestly Medal winner	
Nancy J. Currie-Gregg	Engineering	Engineer, United States Army officer and a former NASA astronaut	
Bonnie J. Dunbar	Engieering	Engineer and retired NASA astronaut	
Michael E. DeBakey	School of Veterinary Medicine & Biomedical Sciences	World-renowned cardiac surgeon, innovator, and scientist	
Stephen A. Fulling	Mathematics	Theoretical physicist known for preliminary work that led to the discovery of the Unruh effect (also known as the Fulling-Davies-Unruh effect)	
Leonid Keldysh	Mathematics	Namesake of Keldysh formalism	
Robert Kennicutt	Physics & Astronomy	Principal investigator for the Spitzer Infrared Nearby Galaxies Survey (SINGS)	
John Henry Kinealy	Engineering	Engineer and inventor	
Gordon Manley	Meteorology	Climatologist	
Ben Neuman	Biology and Medical School	Virologist	
Leonard M. Pike	Vegetable and Fruit Improvement Center	Established the Vegetable and Fruit Improvement Center at Texas A&M	
Marlan Scully	Physics	Physicist	
Hobart Muir Smith	Wildlife management	Herpetologist; credited with describing more than 100 new species of American reptiles and amphibians	
Bjarne Stroustrup	Computer science	Designer and original implementer of the C++ programming language	
Nicholas B. Suntzeff	Astronomy	Cosmologist, winner of Gruber Prize in cosmology, co-discoverer of dark energy	
Fred Weick		Aviation pioneer	
James Womack	Biology	Wolf Prize winner	

=== Sports ===
Name	Department	Notability	References
Bob Griffin	English	American-Israeli basketball player, and English Literature professor	
Mauro Hamza	Fencing	Egyptian fencing coach	

== Athletes ==
=== Baseball ===
Name	Class year	Notability	References
Chad Allen	1997	Former MLB player; 1996 Olympic bronze medalist	
Kevin Beirne	1996	Former MLB player	
Matt Blank	1997	Former MLB player	
Rip Collins	1919	Former MLB player	
Lew Ford		Former MLB player	
Casey Fossum		Former MLB player	
Brandyn Garcia	2023	MLB pitcher for the Arizona Diamondback	
Jeff Granger		Former MLB player	
Michael Helman	2018	MLB player for the Texas Rangers	
Grady Higginbotham	1920	Texas A&M baseball head coach (1930–1935); Texas Tech Red Raiders baseball head coach (1928–1929); Texas Tech Red Raider football head coach (1929); Texas Tech Red Raiders basketball head coach (1925–1927)	
Zach Jackson	2005	Former MLB player	
Davey Johnson		Former MLB player and team manager; 2008 Olympic bronze medalist	
Logan Kensing	2005	Former MLB player	
Chuck Knoblauch	1990	1991 AL Rookie of the Year, 4x All-Star (1992, 1994, 1996, 1997), 4× World Series champion (1991, 1998–2000), 1997 Gold Glove Award recipient, 2x Silver Slugger Award recipient (1995, 1997)	
Bryce Miller	2021	MLB pitcher for the Seattle Mariners	
A. J. Minter	2015	MLB pitcher for the New York Mets, 2021 World Series champion	
Braden Montgomery	2024	MLB player for the Chicago White Sox	
Wally Moon	1951	1954 MLB rookie of the year, 1960 Gold Glove winner, 3× All-Star (1957, 1959, 1959²), 3× World Series champion (1959, 1963, 1965), 1960 Gold Glove Award recipient	
Trey Moore		Former MLB player	
Jake Mooty		Former MLB player	
Troy Neel		Former MLB player	
C. E. "Pat" Olsen	1923	Former professional baseball player; namesake of Olsen Field	
Les Peden		Former MLB player	
Cliff Pennington		Former MLB player, current assistant coach for Texas A&M	
Cotton Pippen		Former MLB player	
Brooks Raley		MLB pitcher for the New York Mets	
Eric Reed	2003	Former MLB player	
Topper Rigney		Former MLB player	
Justin Ruggiano	2004	Former MLB player; 2007 Baseball World Cup player	
Ryan Rupe	1998	Former MLB player	
Braden Shewmake	2019	MLB player for the Houston Astros	
Ross Stripling		Former MLB player, 2018 All-Star	
Russ Swan	1986	Former MLB player	
Mark Thurmond	1979	Former MLB player	
Jason Tyner	1999	Former MLB player	
Michael Wacha		MLB pitcher for the Kansas City Royals. 2013 NLCS MVP, 2015 All-Star	
Kevin Whelan		Former MLB player	
Kelly Wunsch	1994	Former MLB player	

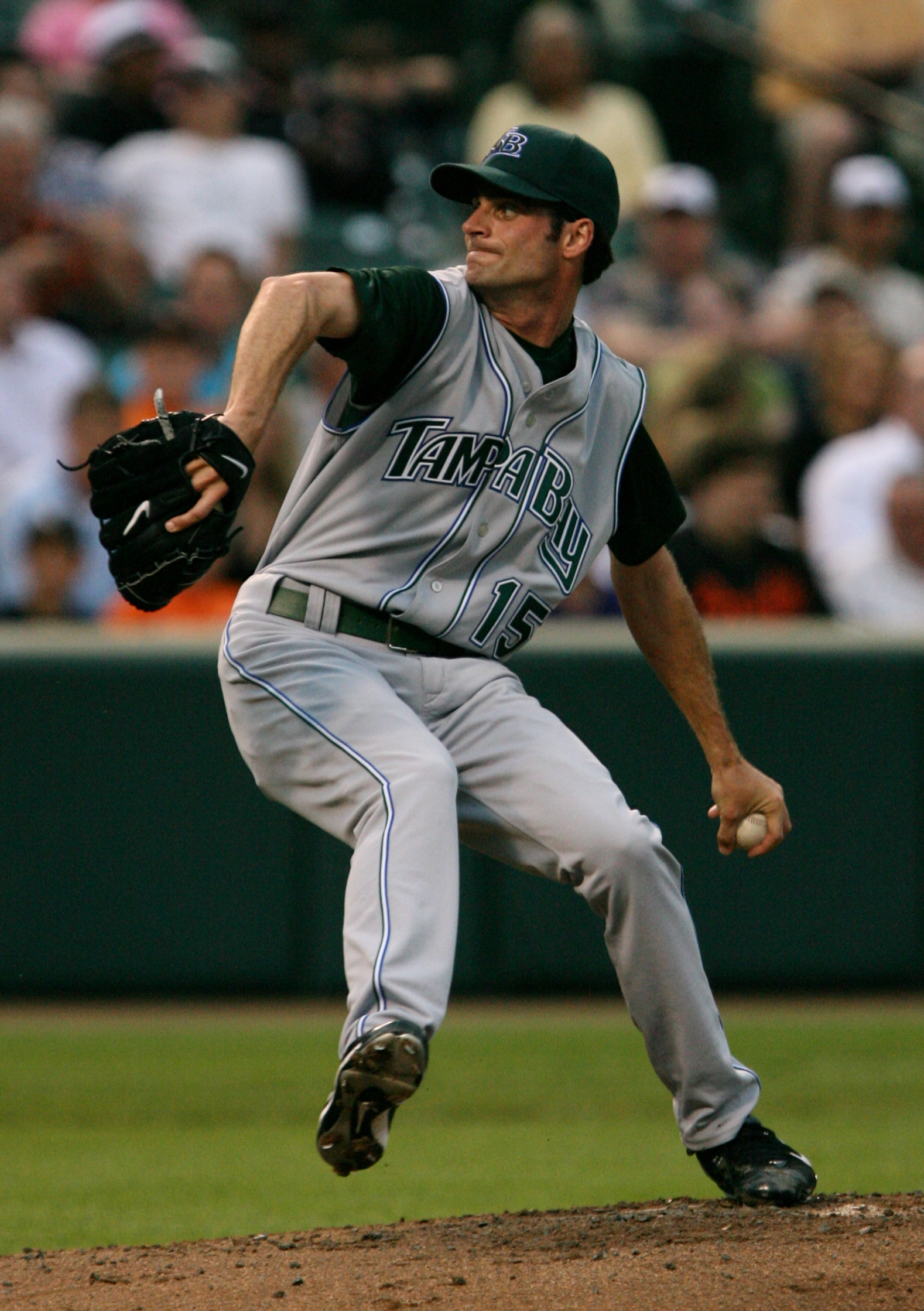
Casey Fossum

=== Basketball ===
Name	Class year	Notability	References
Morenike Atunrase	2008	Former WNBA player	
John Beasley	1966	former ABA player	
David Britton	1979	former NBA player	
R. C. Buford	1980	general manager of the San Antonio Spurs	
Alex Caruso	2016	NBA player for the Oklahoma City Thunder. 2x NBA Champion (2020, 2025)	
Winston Crite	1987	former NBA player	
Walt Davis	1952	former NBA player. 2× NBA champion (1956, 1958)	
A'Quonesia Franklin	2008	Former WNBA player, current head coach for Lamar	
Danuel House Jr.	2016	Former NBA player	
Quenton Jackson	2022	NBA player for the Indiana Pacers	
Jalen Jones		Player for Satria Muda Bandung in the Indonesian Basketball League	
DeAndre Jordan		NBA player for the New Orleans Pelicans. NBA Champion (2023), NBA All-Star (2017), 2x NBA rebounding leader (2014, 2015)	
Antanas Kavaliauskas	2007	Former professional player, current director of player development at Wake Forest	
Acie Law IV	2007	Former NBA player, current vice president of player personnel for the Chicago Bulls	
Doug Lee	1984	Former NBA player	
Darryl McDonald	1988	Former NBL player and coach	
Khris Middleton		NBA player for the Dallas Mavericks, NBA Champion (2021), 3x NBA All-Star (2019, 2020, 2022)	
Josh Nebo	2020	Professional player	
Sonny Parker	1976	Former NBA player	
Jaynetta Saunders	2001	Former WNBA player	
Elijah Thomas		Professional player	
Brooks Thompson	1986	Former NBA player, former head coach at UTSA	
Robert Williams III		NBA player for the Portland Trail Blazers	
Toccara Williams	2004	Former WNBA player	
Antoine Wright	2006	Former NBA player	

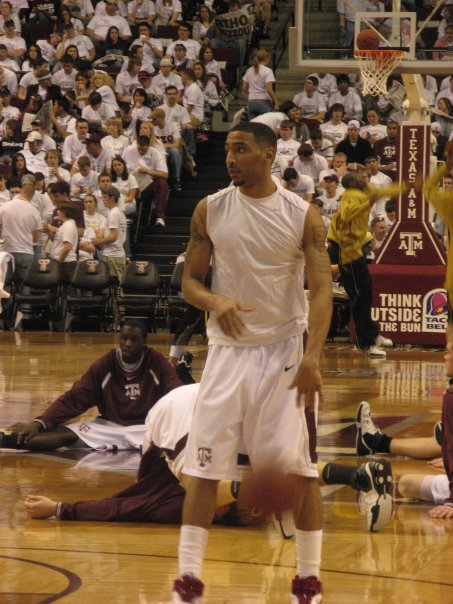
Acie Law IV

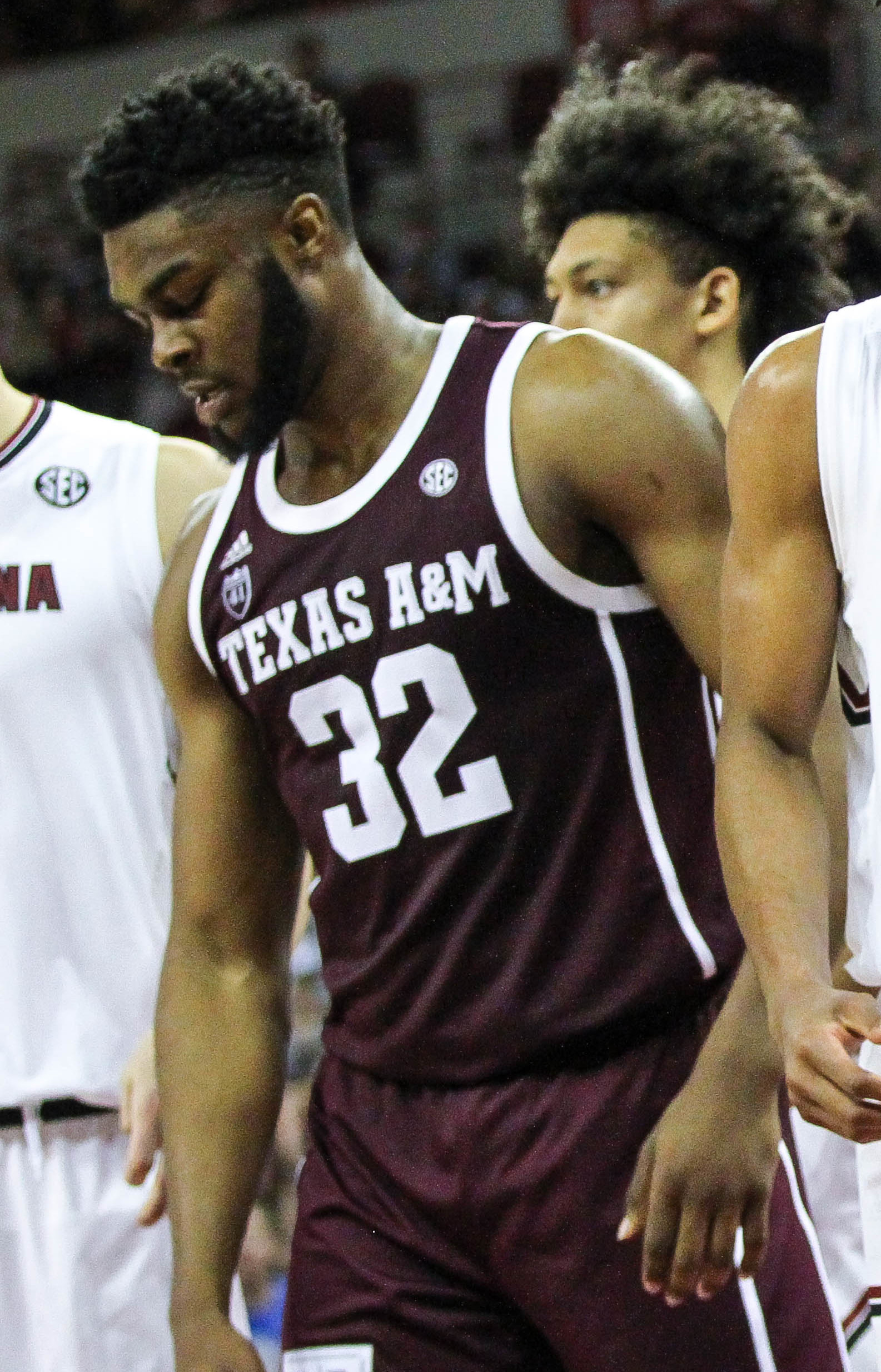
Josh Nebo

- Tyrece Radford (born 1999), basketball player in the Israeli Basketball Premier League

=== American football ===
Name	Class year	Notability	References
De'Von Achane	2022	NFL player for the Miami Dolphins, 2025 Pro Bowl	
Sam Adams	1993	Former NFL player, 3× Pro Bowl (2000, 2001, 2004), Super Bowl XXXV champion	
Dennis Allen	1995	NFL coach, Super Bowl XLIV champion	
Keith Baldwin		Former NFL player	
Ken Beck		Former NFL player	
Phil Bennett	1978	Former SMU Mustangs football head coach (2002–2007)	
Martellus Bennett		Former NFL player, 2014 Pro Bowl, Super Bowl LI champion; brother of Michael Bennett	
Michael Bennett	2009	Former NFL player, 3× Pro Bowl (2015–2017), Super Bowl XLVIII champion; brother of Martellus Bennett	
Rocky Bernard	2002	Former NFL player, Super Bowl XLVI champion	
Rod Bernstine	1987	Former NFL player	
Harvey "Bum" Bright	1943	Former owner of the Dallas Cowboys	
Reggie Brown	1999	Former NFL player	
Domingo Bryant		Former NFL player	
Melvin Bullitt	2007	Former NFL player	
Lee Roy Caffey	1963	Former NFL player, 1965 Pro Bowl, 3× NFL champion (1965–1967), 3× Super Bowl champion (I, II, VI), member of the Green Bay Packers Hall of Fame & Texas A&M Hall of Fame	
Dan Campbell	1999	Former [NFL player, current head coach of the Detroit Lions, 2023 NFL Coach of the Year	
Red Cashion	1953	Former NFL official	
Ray Childress	1985	Former NFL player, 5× Pro Bowl (1988, 1990–1993)	
Mike Clark	1962	Former NFL player, 1966 Pro Bowl, Super Bowl VI champion	
Chris Cole	1998	Former NFL player	
Calvin Collins	1995	Former NFL player	
Albert Connell	1996	Former NFL player	
Bobby Joe Conrad	1958	Former NFL player, 1964 Pro Bowl	
Quentin Coryatt	1994	Former NFL player	
John David Crow	1957	1957 Heisman Trophy winner, former NFL player, 4× Pro Bowl (1959, 1960, 1962, 1965), former Texas A&M athletic director (1988–1993)	
Matt Darwin	1985	Former NFL player	
Sammy Davis	2003	Former NFL player	
Curtis Dickey	1980	Former NFL player	
Ron Edwards	2001	Former NFL player	
Dave Elmendorf	1971	Former NFL player, 1965 Pro Bowl	
Eric England	1993	Former NFL player	
Mike Evans	2014	NFL player for the San Francisco 49ers, 6× Pro Bowl (2016, 2018, 2019, 2021, 2023, 2024), Super Bowl LV champion, 2023 NFL receiving touchdowns co-leader, holds record for most consecutive 1,000 yard receiving seasons to start a career (11)	
Robert Ferguson	2001	Former NFL player	
Ronald Flemons	2001	Former NFL player	
Jerry Fontenot	1998	Former NFL player and assistant coach, Super Bowl XLV champion	
Tony Franklin	1979	Former NFL player, 1986 Pro Bowl	
Myles Garrett		NFL player for the Los Angeles Rams, 7× Pro Bowl (2018, 2020−2025), 2025 Deacon Jones Award winner, 2× NFL Defensive Player of the Year (2023, 2025), single season sack record (23), most consecutive seasons with 12+ sacks (6)	
E. King Gill		Inspiration for the moniker "12th Man"	
Aaron Glenn	1993	Former NFL player, 3× Pro Bowl (1997, 1998, 2002), current head coach of the New York Jets	
Jason Glenn	2000	Former NFL player, brother of Aaron Glenn	
Dante Hall	1998	Former NFL player, 2× Pro Bowl (2002, 2003), 2004 NFL kickoff return yards leader, 2× NFL 2000s All-Decade Team, (Note: Hall has the unique distinction of being the only player to be selected to the 2000s All-Decade Team at two positions, kick returner and punt returner.) member of the Kansas City Chiefs Hall of Fame	
Curley Hallman	1969	Former football coach	
Geoff Hangartner	2004	Former NFL player	
Lester Hayes	1976	Former NFL player, 5× Pro Bowl (1980–1984), 1980 NFL interceptions leader, 1980 NFL Defensive Player of the Year, NFL 1980s All-Decade Team	
Greg Hill	1993	Former NFL player	
Warrick Holdman	1998	Former NFL player	
Johnny Holland	1986	Former NFL player, Super Bowl XXXI champion, member of the Green Bay Packers Hall of Fame, current assistant coach for the San Francisco 49ers	
Robert Jackson	1976	Former NFL player	
Tramain Jacobs		Former NFL player	
Michael Jameson	2000	Former NFL player	
Bethel Johnson	2002	Former NFL player, 2× Super Bowl champion (XXXVIII, XXXIX)	
Johnny Jolly	2006	Former NFL player	
Keith Joseph	2004	Former NFL player	
Drew Kaser		Former NFL player	
Terrence Kiel Sr.	2002	Former NFL player	
Christian Kirk	2017	NFL player for the San Francisco 49ers	
Kelvin Korver		Former NFL player, Super Bowl XI champion	
Gary Kubiak	1982	Former NFL player and head coach, 4× Super Bowl champion (XXIX, XXXII, XXXIII, 50), Houston Texans career wins record (63)	
Klint Kubiak	2012	NFL head coach of the Las Vegas Raiders, son of Gary Kubiak	
Yale Lary	1952	Former NFL player, 9× Pro Bowl (1953, 1956–1962, 1964), 3× NFL champion (1952, 1953, 1957), member of the Pride of the Lions, NFL 1950s All-Decade Team, member of the Pro Football Hall of Fame	
Shane Lechler	1999	Former NFL player, 7× Pro Bowl (2001, 2004, 2007–2011), 4× NFL punting yards leader (2003, 2008, 2009, 2017), 2009 Golden Toe Award winner, NFL 2000s All-Decade Team, NFL 2010s All-Decade Team, NFL 100th Anniversary All-Time Team, record for most career punting touchbacks (178)	
Nnamdi Madubuike	2019	NFL player for the Baltimore Ravens, 2× Pro Bowl (2023, 2024)	
Braden Mann	2019	NFL player for the Philadelphia Eagles, Super Bowl LIX champion, 2020 NFL punting yards leader	
Johnny Manziel	2014	2012 Heisman Trophy winner, former NFL player	
Jason Mathews	2003	Former NFL player	
Jake Matthews	2013	NFL player for the Atlanta Falcons, 2018 Pro Bowl	
Erik McCoy	2018	NFL player for the New Orleans Saints, 2x Pro Bowl (2023, 2024)	
Leeland McElroy	1997	Former NFL player	
Seth McKinney	2000	Former NFL player	
Steve McKinney	1997	Former NFL player	
Reggie McNeal	2006	Former NFL player	
Ray Mickens	1996	Former NFL player	
Von Miller	2011	NFL player for the Dallas Cowboys, 2011 NFL Defensive Rookie of the Year, 8× Pro Bowl (2011, 2012, 2014–2019), 2× Super Bowl champion (50, LVI), Super Bowl 50 MVP, NFL 2010s All-Decade Team	
Brandon Mitchell	1996	Former NFL player, Super Bowl XXXVI champion	
Mike Montgomery		Former NFL player	
Mark Moseley		Former NFL player, Super Bowl XVII champion, 1982 NFL Most Valuable Player	
Don Muhlbach	2003	Former NFL player, 2× Pro Bowl (2012, 2018)	
Terrence Murphy	2005	Former NFL player	
Robert Neyland		Former University of Tennessee head coach, namesake of Neyland Stadium	
Dat Nguyen	1998	Former NFL player and assistant coach	
Ernie Pannell		Former NFL player	
Jack Pardee	1957	Former NFL player and coach	
Gary Reynolds		Former NFL assistant coach	
Tommy Robison		Former NFL player	
Zerick Rollins		Former NFL assistant coach	
Thomas Sanders		Former NFL player, Super Bowl XX champion	
Ed Simonini	1976	Former NFL player	
Shawn Slocum	1984	Former NFL assistant coach, Super Bowl XLV champion; son of RC Slocum	
Detron Smith	1995	Former NFL player, 1999 Pro Bowl, 2× Super Bowl champion (XXXII, XXXIII)	
Kevin Smith	1992	Former NFL player, 1996, Second-team All-Pro, 3× Super Bowl champion (XXVII, XXVIII, XXX)	
Cameron Spikes	1998	Former NFL player, Super Bowl XXXIV champion	
Gene Stallings	1957	Former NFL player and coach, 1992 national champion	
George Strohmeyer		AAFC player	
Boone Stutz	2005	Former NFL player	
Ryan Tannehill	2011	Former NFL player, 2019 Pro Bowl, 2019 NFL Comeback Player of the Year, 2019 NFL passer rating leader	
Damon Tassos		Former NFL player	
Jamaar Taylor	2004	Former NFL player	
Garth TenNapel	1976	Former NFL player	
Pat Thomas		Former NFL player, 2× Pro Bowl (1978, 1980)	
Rodney Thomas	1995	Former NFL player	
Rex Tucker	1998	Former NFL player	
Joe Utay	1908	College Football Hall of Fame player	
Ty Warren	2003	Former NFL player, 2007 First-team All-Pro, 2× Super Bowl champion (XXXVIII, XXXIX) champion, New England Patriots All-2000s Team	
Richmond Webb	1990	Former NFL player, 7× Pro Bowl (1990–1996), member of the Miami Dolphins Honor Roll, NFL 1990s All-Decade Team	
Jason Webster	1998	Former NFL player	
Taylor Whitley	2002	Former NFL player	
Mike Whitwell	1981	Former NFL player	
Pat Williams	1996	Former NFL player, 3× Pro Bowl (2006–2008)	
Billy Yates	2002	Former NFL player, Super Bowl XXXIX champion	

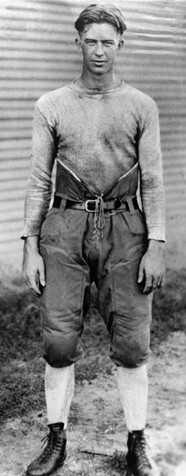
E. King Gill during the 1921–1922 season, the original Twelfth Man

=== Golf ===
Name	Class year	Notability	References
Sam Bennett		The Masters Low Amateur (2023), U.S. Amateur champion (2022)	
Danny Briggs	1983	PGA Tour golfer	
Bronson Burgoon		PGA Tour golfer; Texas A&M Golf national champion	
Cameron Champ		PGA Tour golfer	
Jeff Maggert	1986	PGA Tour golfer	
Bobby Nichols		Twelve-time winner on the PGA Tour; winner of the 1964 PGA Championship and runner-up at the 1967 Masters	
Ryan Palmer	2000	PGA & European Tour golfer	
Philip Parkin	1984	Winner of British Amateur Championship (1983); Sir Henry Cotton Rookie of the Year (1984)	

=== Olympics ===
Name	Class year	Notability	References
Cammile Adams	2014	Member of the US Olympic Swimming team (2012)	
Triin Aljand	2010	Member of the Estonia Olympic swimming team (2004, 2008, 2012)	
Alia Atkinson	2010	Member of the Jamaica Olympic Swimming team (2004, 2008, 2012, 2016, 2020); 2010 NCAA 200 breaststroke champion	
Randy Barnes	1989	Member of the US Olympic Shot Put team; 1988 silver medalist, 1996 gold medalist	
Aviv Barzelay		Israeli Olympic swimmer	
Kanika Beckles	2013	Member of the Grenada Olympic Track & Field team (2012)	
Janeil Bellille	2015	Member of the Trinidad and Tobago Olympic Track & Field team (2012)	
Walt Davis	1952	Member of US Olympic Team High Jump; 1952 gold medalist	
Wayne Davis	2014	Member of the Trinidad and Tobago Olympic Track & Field team (2012)	
Erica Dittmer	2014	Member of the Mexico Olympic Swimming team (2012)	
Amini Fonua	2012	Member of the Tonga Olympic Swimming team (2012)	
Tabarie Henry	2011	Member of the U.S. Virgin Islands Olympic Track & Field team (2008, 2012)	
Darrow Hooper	1953	Member of US Olympic Team Shot Put; 1952 silver medalist	
Liliana Ibanez	2014	Member of the Mexico Olympic Swimming team (2012)	
Riley Janes	2002	Member of the Canada Olympic Swimming team (2004)	
Casey Kaufhold		Member of the United States Olympic Archery team (2024), Mixed-team Bronze Medalist	
Antanas Kavaliauskas	2007	Member of the Lithuania Olympic Basketball team (2012)	
Breeja Larson	2014	Gold medalist in the 4x100-meter medley relay (2012)	
Miranda Leek	2016	Member of the US Olympic Archery team (2012)	
Deon Lendore	2015	Member of the Trinidad and Tobago Olympic Track & Field team (2012)	
Randy Matson	1967	Member of the US Olympic Shot Put Team; 1964 silver medalist and 1968 gold medalist	
Jennifer McFalls	1994	Member of the US Olympic Softball team	
Rita Medrano	2012	Member of the Mexico Olympic Swimming team (2012)	
Jennifer Nichols	2012	Member of the US Olympic Archery team (2004, 2008, 2012)	
Boone Niederhofer	2016	Member of the 2026 US Olympic Bobsled team	
Tetsuo Okamoto	1959	1952 bronze medalist in swimming; Brazil's first-ever Olympic medalist	
Jaele Patrick	2012	Member of the US Olympic Swimming team (2012); 2012 3M diving NCAA champion	
Gerald Phiri	2011	Member of the Zambia Olympic Track & Field team (2012)	
Demetrius Pinder	2011	Member of the Bahamas Olympic Track & Field team (2012)	
Matt Rose	2004	Member of the Canada Olympic Swimming team (2004)	
Eric Sehn	2008	Member of the Canada Olympic Diving team (2012)	
Mike Stulce	1991	Member of the US Olympic Shot Put team; 1992 gold medalist	
Stacy Sykora	1999	Member of the US Olympic Volleyball team (2000, 2004, 2008)	
Jeneba Tarmoh	2012	Member of the US Olympic Track & Field team (2012)	
Julia Wilkinson	2010	Member of the Canada Olympic Swimming team (2008, 2012); all-time winningest Big 12 swimmer	
Vic Wunderle	2002	Silver medalist in archery (2000)	

=== Tennis ===
Name	Class year	Notability	References
Grant Connell	1986	Former world No. 1 doubles player	
Dean Goldfine	1987	Former Team USA coach and former coach of Andy Roddick	
Austin Krajicek	2011	Doubles champion at the 2023 French Open; 2024 Olympic doubles silver medalist	
Valentin Vacherot	2021	Current top 50 Singles player	

=== Track & field ===
Name	Class year	Notability	References
Randy Barnes	1989	Member of the US Olympic Shot Put team; 1988 silver medalist, 1996 gold medalist	
Kanika Beckles	2013	Member of the Grenada Olympic Track & Field team (2012)	
Janeil Bellille	2015	Member of the Trinidad and Tobago Olympic Track & Field team (2012)	
Howard Davis	1992	Member of US Olympic Team High Jump; 1988 silver medalist	
Walt Davis	1952	Member of US Olympic Team High Jump; 1952 gold medalist	
Wayne Davis	2014	Member of the Trinidad and Tobago Olympic Track & Field team (2012)	
Bryce Deadmon	2019	Member of the US Olympic Track & Field team, 2020 & 2024 gold medalist	
Simone Facey	2009	Member of the Jamaica Olympic Track & Field team; 2016 silver medalist	
Art Harnden	1945	Member of the US Olympic Track & Field team, 1948 gold medalist	
Tabarie Henry	2011	Member of the U.S. Virgin Islands Olympic Track & Field team (2008, 2012)	
Darrow Hooper	1953	Member of US Olympic Team Shot Put; 1952 silver medalist	
Fred Kerley	2019	Member of US Olympic Team; 2020 silver medalist & 2024 bronze medalist	
Anjanette Kirkland		Hurdler; 2001 World Indoor 60 m hurdles champion; 2001 World 100 m champion	
Fabrice Lapierre		Long jumper; 2005 NCAA long jump national champion	
Breeja Larson	2014	Gold medalist in the 4x100-meter medley relay (2012)	
Deon Lendore	2015	Member of the Trinidad and Tobago Olympic Track & Field team (2012);The Bowerman award winner (2014)	
Shamier Little	2016	Member of the US Olympic Track & Field team; 2014 gold medalist	
Randy Matson	1967	Member of the US Olympic Shot Put Team; 1964 silver medalist and 1968 gold medalist	
Athing Mu	2021	Member of the US Olympic Track & Field team; 2020 gold medalist; The Bowerman Award winner (2021)	
Gerald Phiri	2011	Member of the Zambia Olympic Track & Field team (2012)	
Demetrius Pinder	2011	Member of the Bahamas Olympic Track & Field team (2012)	
Mike Stulce	1991	Member of the US Olympic Shot Put team; 1992 gold medalist	
Jeneba Tarmoh	2012	Member of the US Olympic Track & Field team; 2012 gold medalist	
Lindon Victor	2017	Member of the Grenada Olympic Track & Field team; 2024 bronze medalist	

=== Swimming & diving ===
Name	Class year	Notability	References
Cammile Adams	2014	Member of the US Olympic Swimming team (2012)	
Triin Aljand	2010	Member of the Estonia Olympic Swimming team (2004, 2008, 2012)	
Alia Atkinson	2010	Member of the Jamaica Olympic Swimming team (2004, 2008, 2012, 2016, 2020); 2010 NCAA 200 breaststroke champion	
Aviv Barzelay		Israeli Olympic swimmer	
Shaine Casas		Swimmer; 2021 world short course 100 m backstroke champion	
Erica Dittmer	2014	Member of the Mexico Olympic Swimming team (2012)	
Amini Fonua	2012	Member of the Tonga Olympic Swimming team (2012)	
Liliana Ibanez	2014	Member of the Mexico Olympic Swimming team (2012)	
Riley Janes	2002	Member of the Canada Olympic Swimming team (2004)	
Rita Medrano	2012	Member of the Mexico Olympic Swimming team (2012)	
Tetsuo Okamoto	1959	1952 bronze medalist in swimming; Brazil's first-ever Olympic medalist	
Jaele Patrick	2012	Member of the US Olympic Swimming team (2012); 2012 3M diving NCAA champion	
Matt Rose	2004	Member of the Canada Olympic Swimming team (2004)	
Eric Sehn	2008	Member of the Canada Olympic Diving team (2012)	
Julia Wilkinson	2010	Member of the Canada Olympic Swimming team (2008, 2012); all-time winningest Big 12 swimmer	

=== Other ===
Name	Class year	Notability	References
Jacobs Crawley		Rodeo world champion	
Brent Crouch	1998	Current women's volleyball coach at Auburn University	
Kristy Hawkins		Professional bodybuilder	
Eddie Hill	1957	Hall of Fame drag racer	
Casey Kaufhold		2024 Summer Olympics Archery Mixed-team Bronze Medalist	
Ben Keating	1994	Professional race car driver and businessman	
Raquel Rodriguez		Professional wrestler	

== Fictional ==
Name	Class year	Notability	References
PC Principal		Character on the television show South Park. Principal at South Park Elementary. Reveals he is a Texas A&M alumnus in the season 19 episode "Stunning and Brave".	
Joaquin Reyes		Character on the television show Dutton Ranch. Eldest son of Beulah Jackson and fixer of the family. Is seen wearing an A&M branded t-shirt in season 1 episode "Peaceful Find Peace".	
Smash Williams		Character on the television show Friday Night Lights. Star running back on the Dillon High School Panthers. Accepts a scholarship to play at Texas A&M in season 3 episode "Hello, Goodbye".	
