= Joseph W. Ashy =

United States Air Force general

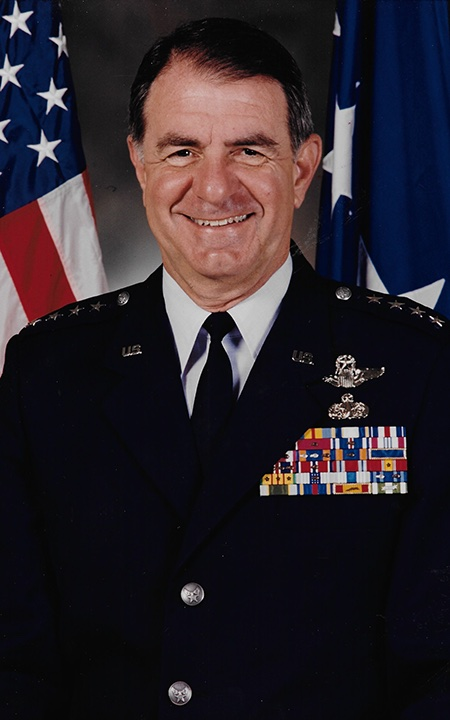
- Born: October 16, 1940 (age 86); Jasper, Texas, U.S.
- Military career
- Allegiance: United States of America
- Branch: United States Air Force
- Service years: 1962–1996
- Rank: General
- Commands: North American Aerospace Defense Command; United States Space Command
- Conflicts: Vietnam War
- Awards: Silver Star; Legion of Merit (2); Distinguished Flying Cross (2); Air Medal (14)

Joseph William Ashy, (born October 16, 1940) is a retired United States Air Force (USAF) general who was commander in chief of North American Aerospace Defense Command and United States Space Command, and commander of Air Force Space Command, headquartered at Peterson Air Force Base, Colorado. As commander of NORAD, General Ashy was responsible for the air sovereignty of the United States and Canada, as well as for providing tactical warning and attack assessment. As USCINCSPACE, he commanded the unified command responsible for directing space control and support operations including theater missile defense. As COMAFSPC, he directed satellite control, warning, space launch and ballistic missile operations missions through a worldwide network of support facilities and bases.

Ashy entered the U.S. Air Force in 1962 as a distinguished graduate of Texas A&M University. He has commanded two fighter wings, the USAF Tactical Fighter Weapons Center, Nellis Air Force Base, Nevada; and Air Training Command. He also commanded NATO's Allied Air Forces Southern Europe and the USAF Sixteenth Air Force. As the air component commander to Commander-in-Chief, Allied Forces Southern Europe (CINCAFSOUTH), he commanded NATO air forces in the Mediterranean area and directed the air operation over Bosnia. He was a command pilot with more than 3,500 flying hours in fighter and attack aircraft, including 289 combat missions in Vietnam.

He holds a master's degree in public administration from Auburn University. He retired on October 1, 1996.

== Education ==
- 1962 Bachelor of Science degree in mechanical engineering, Texas A&M University
- 1979 Master's degree in public administration, Auburn University, Alabama
- 1979 Air War College, Maxwell Air Force Base, Alabama
- 1987 National Security Programs, John F. Kennedy School of Government, Harvard University

== Assignments ==
- September 1962 – October 1963, student, pilot training, Reese Air Force Base
- November 1963 – July 1964, student, F-100 Super Sabre combat crew training, Luke Air Force Base, Arizona
- August 1964 – August 1967, F-100 fighter pilot, 494th Tactical Fighter Squadron, RAF Lakenheath, England
- August 1967 – August 1968, F-100 fighter pilot, 531st Tactical Fighter Squadron, and later, weapons and tactics officer, 3rd Tactical Fighter Wing, Bien Hoa Air Base, South Vietnam
- September 1968 – August 1969, Air Staff training program, plans and operations, Headquarters U.S. Air Force, Washington, D.C.
- September 1969 – June 1971, F-100 instructor pilot, 426th Tactical Fighter Training Squadron; then A-7 Corsair II instructor pilot, 310th Tactical Fighter Training Squadron, Luke Air Force Base, Arizona
- June 1971 – April 1972, A-7 instructor pilot, 333d Tactical Fighter Training Squadron, Davis-Monthan Air Force Base, Arizona
- April 1972 – June 1975, action officer, then chief, fighter assignments section, Air Force Military Personnel Center, Randolph Air Force Base, Texas
- July 1975 – July 1976, operations officer, 36th Tactical Fighter Squadron, (F-4s), Osan Air Base, South Korea
- August 1976 – August 1978, commander, 421st Tactical Fighter Squadron (F-4s); then assistant deputy commander for operations, 388th Tactical Fighter Wing, Hill Air Force Base, Utah
- August 1978 – June 1979, student, Air War College, Maxwell Air Force Base, Alabama
- July 1979 – August 1982, division chief, plans and operations, then executive officer to the Air Force chief of staff, Headquarters U.S. Air Force, Washington, D.C.
- August 1982 – May 1984, commander, 37th Tactical Fighter Wing, George Air Force Base, California
- May 1984 – February 1986, commander, 57th Fighter Weapons Wing, Nellis Air Force Base, Nevada
- February 1986 – June 1988, director, Joint Control Group, U.S. Atlantic Command Exercise Ocean Venture '86; then inspector general, chief of staff; deputy chief of staff, plans; Headquarters Tactical Air Command, Langley Air Force Base, Virginia
- June 1988 – July 1989, commander, U.S. Air Force Tactical Fighter Weapons Center, Nellis Air Force Base, Nevada
- July 1989 – June 1990, deputy chief of staff, operations; then vice commander, Tactical Air Command, Langley Air Force Base, Virginia
- June 1990 – December 1992, commander, Air Training Command, Randolph Air Force Base, Texas
- December 1992 – February 1994, commander, Allied Air Forces Southern Europe and deputy commander in chief, U.S. Air Forces in Europe for the Southern Area
- February 1994 – September 1994, commander, Allied Air Forces Southern Europe and commander, 16th Air Force, U.S. Air Forces in Europe
- September 1994 – 1996, commander in chief, North American Aerospace Defense Command and United States Space Command, and commander, Air Force Space Command, Peterson Air Force Base, Colorado

== Flight information ==
- Rating: Command pilot
- Flight hours: More than 3,500
- Aircraft flown: F-100 Super Sabre, A-7 Corsair II, F-4 Phantom II, F-5, F-16 Fighting Falcon

== Major awards and decorations ==
- Defense Distinguished Service Medal with oak leaf cluster
- Air Force Distinguished Service Medal with oak leaf cluster
- Silver Star
- Legion of Merit with oak leaf cluster
- Distinguished Flying Cross with oak leaf cluster
- Defense Meritorious Service Medal
- Meritorious Service Medal with two oak leaf clusters
- Air Medal with 13 oak leaf clusters
- Air Force Commendation Medal
- Vietnam Service Medal
- Republic of Vietnam Gallantry Cross with Palm

== Effective dates of promotion ==
- Second lieutenant August 24, 1962
- First lieutenant March 30, 1964
- Captain January 19, 1967
- Major March 1, 1971
- Lieutenant colonel May 1, 1975
- Colonel May 1, 1978
- Brigadier general October 1, 1984
- Major general August 1, 1987
- Lieutenant general November 21, 1989
- General September 13, 1994

== See also ==
- List of Texas A&M University people
- List of Auburn University people
