= George Stephen Hayes =

American business executive

Stephen Hayes

President Emeritus at the Corporate Council on Africa
- In office 2017–present

CEO of the Corporate Council on Africa
- In office 1999–2017
- Succeeded by: Florizelle Liser

Founder and president at American Center for International Leadership
- In office 1985–1999

Personal details
- Born: George Stephen Hayes; 27 May 1947 (age 79) Sullivan, Indiana, United States
- Education: Indiana University; Texas A&M University

George Stephen Hayes commonly referred to as Stephen Hayes (born May 27, 1947), is an American NGO leader and international program developer. He is known for his leadership in U.S.–Africa economic relations and international policy dialogue. He served as president and CEO of the Corporate Council on Africa from 1999 to 2017 and was subsequently named President Emeritus. During his tenure, the organization expanded significantly and advocated for the implementation of African Growth and Opportunity Act.

Earlier in his career, Hayes founded the American Center for International Leadership (ACIL) in 1985, promoting dialogue between emerging leaders in the United States and countries including the Soviet Union, China, Vietnam, and Libya. He was involved in international nonprofit initiatives, including refugee support and global youth programs, and was a founding figure in the Infant Formula Campaign, widely known as the 1977 Nestlé boycott.

His work at Corporate Council on Africa earned major recognition in the USA, including the Ron Brown Award for International Leadership in 2008 and the President's “E” Award for Excellence in International Trade in 2015. In 2023, he joined the international consulting firm Gainful Solutions as a partner. He earned a bachelor's degree from Indiana University in 1969 and a master's degree in agricultural economics from Texas A&M University in 1972.

== Biography ==
Hayes was born on May 27, 1947, in Sullivan, Indiana. He attended North Knox High School, he was among the newspaper carriers and played on the school’s football team eventually, he received scholarships from Indiana University and The Indianapolis Star. Hayes earned a Bachelor of Arts degree in Political Science in 1969 from Indiana University and worked in a refugee camp in Tyre, Lebanon during his studies. After graduation, he received a fellowship to work at the headquarters of the World Alliance of YMCAs in Geneva.

Hayes later pursued graduate studies at Texas A&M University, earning a master’s degree in agricultural economics in 1972. At the university, he wrote a weekly column for The Battalion, the university newspaper. During this period, he worked on the 1972 presidential campaign of Pete McCloskey as a field director in the New Hampshire Primary.

In 1973, Hayes worked at the Kansas City Museum of History and Science. While there, he took leave to participate in organizing youth-related activities connected to the 1974 United Nations conferences on population in Bucharest and food in Rome. In 1975, following the end of U.S. involvement in the Vietnam War, Hayes was recruited by the YMCA to assist in organizing refugee support efforts in a refugee camp at Fort Chaffee, Arkansas. Hayes subsequently joined the National YMCA headquarters in New York City. He was among the founders of the Infant Formula Campaign, known as the Nestlé’s Boycott. The campaign's conclusion was reported on the front page of The New York Times in 1983.

From 1976 to 1981, while working with the National Board of YMCAs, Hayes also served as a consultant to the United Nations Development Programme’s Non-Governmental Liaison Service, where he organized regional conferences across North America focused on international economic issues.

In 1980s, Hayes was international projects director at AFS Intercultural Programs, and was given special honors at the organization's World Congress in Italy in 1984 for his leadership. In the early 1990s, Hayes served as director of special projects for the University of Denver's Graduate School for International Affairs.

== ACIL ==
In 1985, Hayes established the American Center for International Leadership (ACIL), a nonprofit organization dedicated to promoting dialogue between emerging leaders in the United States and counterparts in countries where prior relations with the U.S. had been limited or strained like the Soviet Union. ACIL was funded by the Rockefeller Brothers Fund, Ford Foundation and others.

In 1987, as a president of ACIL, Hayes participated in programs organized by the National Committee on US-China Relations to engage emerging Chinese and American leaders in bilateral exchanges, continuing similar programs for a decade. He worked with Chinese institutions including the All-China Youth Federation to establish early exchange programs between young leaders of the United States and China during a period of expanding bilateral engagement.

From 1993 to 1999, he engaged in preparatory diplomacy in Libya related to the Pan Am 103/Lockerbie case. During this period, he made multiple visits to Libya and held meetings with Libyan leader Muammar Gaddafi and senior officials, including Abdullah Senussi, as part of diplomatic efforts. He was at times accompanied by former U.S. Assistant Secretary of State Herman Jay Cohen and was debriefed by U.S. government agencies following these visits.

In 1995, ACIL arranged a delegation of Vietnamese leaders to visit the United States, marking the first such visit since the Vietnam War. This followed earlier engagement efforts and contributed to dialogue between U.S. institutions and Vietnamese representatives on post-war relations.

== CCA ==
In 1999, Hayes became president and CEO of the Corporate Council on Africa (CCA), a Washington, D.C.–based business association focused on U.S.–Africa trade and investment. He served on the US Department of State's Economic Policy Advisory Group and was also a member of the Senior Advisory Board to US Department of Defense's AFRICOM, under General Kip Ward.

During his tenure, CCA's membership increased from 86 member companies in 1999 to more than 200 by 2004. CCA engaged in advocacy concerning the African Growth and Opportunity Act (AGOA), enacted in 2000, and in 2003 co-sponsored the Commission on Capital Flows to Africa.

During Hayes’s tenure, the CCA organized the biennial U.S.–Africa Business Summit, a major forum for engagement between the United States and African countries. During Hayes’s leadership, U.S. presidents including Bill Clinton, George W. Bush, and Barack Obama participated in CCA-related programs. In 2014, during the U.S.–Africa Leaders Summit, CCA organized events involving leaders from 50 of the 54 existing African sovereign nations.

The organization also implemented USAID-supported business linkage programs, including South Africa International Business Linkages (SAIBL) and West Africa International Business Linkages (WAIBL), and developed working relationships with regional economic institutions such as the COMESA. CCA also supported corporate HIV/AIDS workplace initiatives with philanthropic backing, including support from the Gates Foundation. Hayes also led multiple trade missions to African countries. In 2011 and 2012, Hayes testified before United States congress on trade and investment matters related to U.S.–Africa economic relations.

At CCA, Hayes served as President of the Coalition for AIDS Relief to Africa (CARA), the organization responsible for the passage by Congress of President's Emergency Plan for AIDS Relief. He also served as President of the Africa Travel Association, which CCA acquired in 2016 as part of its own organization.

In 2015, CCA was awarded the President's “E” Award for Excellence in International Trade, the recognition U.S. entity receives for contributing to the expansion of U.S. exports. He stepped down from the CEO role in 2017 and was subsequently named President Emeritus of the Corporate Council on Africa.

== Other considerations ==
In 2008, Hayes was awarded the U.S. Department of Commerce's Ron Brown Award for International Leadership. In 2023, Hayes joined the international consulting and lobbying firm Gainful Solutions as a partner.

He has also contributed to media including serving as a commentator on African economic issues for international networks and writing an Africa-focused column for U.S. News & World Report.

== Recognitions ==
- 1981: UNDP Leadership Award, United Nations Development Programme.
- 1984: International Program Leadership Award, AFS Intercultural Programs.
- 2001: Citation for leadership in passage of AGOA, Government of Nigeria.
- 2003: Special Award for commitment to Africa, Government of Kenya.
- 2004: Phelophepa humanitarian award from the Transnet Foundation.
- 2006: Leader of the Year, Continental Chamber of Commerce (Chicago).
- 2008: The Ron Brown Award for International Leadership.
- 2010: Cauri d'Or Award for international business leadership (Senegal).
- 2012: Father of the Year, American Diabetes Association (Washington, D.C.).
- 2015: CCA received the President's “E” Award for Excellence in International Trade.
- 2016: The U.S. Business Leader Award from the Africa-America Institute.
- 2019: Global Health Pioneer Award, Arab Health Association (Dubai).
