= John A. Brieden =

American politician

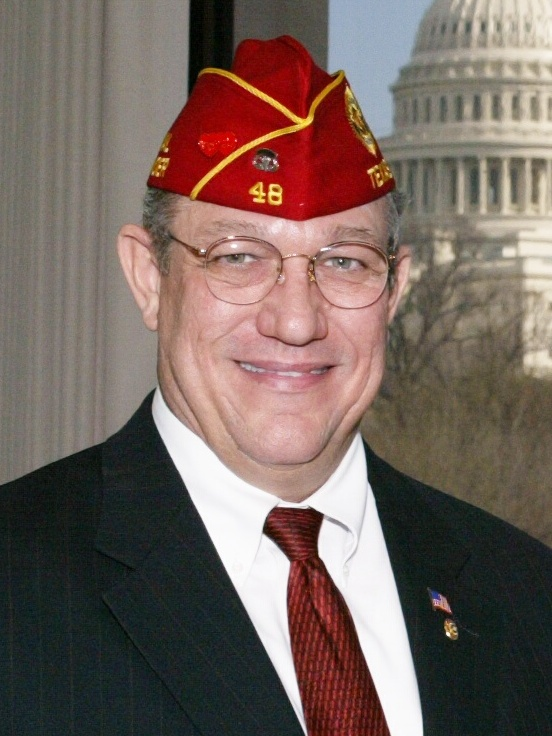
- Brieden in 2004

Washington County Judge
- In office January 1, 2011 – December 31, 2018
- Preceded by: Dorothy Morgan
- Succeeded by: John Durrenberger

National Commander of The American Legion
- In office 2003–2004
- Preceded by: Ronald F. Conley, Sr.
- Succeeded by: Thomas P. Cadmus

Personal details
- Born: John A. Brieden III; 1955 (age 70–71) Freer, Texas, U.S.
- Education: Texas Agricultural and Mechanical University
- Occupation: Politician

Military service
- Allegiance: United States
- Branch: United States Army
- Years of service: 1972–1977
- Rank: Captain
- Unit: Company B, 2d Battalion (M), 50th Infantry Regiment, 2d Armored Division; 1st Battalion, 75th Ranger Regiment (Airborne)
- Awards: Soldier's Medal; See more

John A. Brieden III (born 1955) is an American politician and businessman who served as the National Commander of the American Legion from 2003 to 2004.

== Early life and education ==
Brieden was born in 1955 and educated at the Calallen High School in Corpus Christi, Texas. After graduating from high school, he moved to College Station to attend the Texas A&M University where he roomed with future Texas Governor Rick Perry. He served in the United States Army for close to five years on active duty, leaving the service with the rank of Captain. Brieden later moved to Brenham, Texas where he opened a State Farm Insurance office.

== The American Legion ==
On August 28, 2003, Brieden was elected National Commander of The American Legion. As such, he directed the nation's largest wartime veterans' organization, representing the interests of 2.8 million U.S. veterans. During his term of office, he lobbied for veterans' benefits and continued support for POW/MIA programs.

== Political career ==
Long involved in Republican party politics, Brieden in 2010 decided to run for Judge of Washington County, Texas. He would go on to defeat his opponent, Joel Romo, in the March 2010 Republican primary with 3,337 votes (56.1%) to 2,608 votes (43.9%). He then won the general election over Democrat John Muegge in the November with 6,895 (65.7%) votes to 3,598 (34.3%).

Brieden was re-elected without opposition in 2014 and retired in 2018.

== Military awards ==
Brieden's decorations include the following:

U.S. military decorations
Soldier's Medal
U.S. service medals
National Defense Service Medal
U.S. Army badges and tabs
Parachutist Badge
Ranger Tab

== See also ==
- List of people from Texas
- List of Texas A&M University people

Non-profit organization positions
Preceded by Ronald F. Conley, Sr.	National Commander of The American Legion; 2003 – 2004	Succeeded by Thomas P. Cadmus
Political offices
Preceded by Dorothy Morgan	Judge of Washington County, Texas; 2011 – present	Incumbent
Party political offices
Unknown	Republican nominee for Judge of Washington County, Texas; 2010, 2014	Most recent
