= Russell Lutz =

American science fiction author (born 1968)

Russell William Lutz
- Born: September 14, 1968 (age 57); Illinois, U.S.
- Education: Fort Worth Country Day School; Texas A&M University (BS); University of Texas at Austin
- Occupation: Author
- Writing career
- Genre: Science fiction

Russell William Lutz (born September 14, 1968) is an American science fiction author. His work has appeared in several books, webzines, and magazines, including Byzarium, The SiNK, scifantastic, and anotherealm. He won the 2005 SFFWorld First Place prize for short fiction for the short story "Fall". His first novel, Iota Cycle, was published in 2006 and received an Honorable Mention at the New York Book Festival Awards, his second, The Department of Off World Affairs, in September 2008.

Lutz was born in Illinois. He moved with his family to Fort Worth, Texas, where he attended Fort Worth Country Day School. He earned a Bachelor of Science in mathematics from Texas A&M University and a master's degree in mathematics from the University of Texas at Austin.

Lutz lives in Fort Worth, Texas.

== Bibliography ==
=== Novels ===
- 2008 The Department of Off World Affairs
- 2006 Iota Cycle—Winner, 2006 DIY Festival (Science Fiction); Honorable Mention, 2007 New York Book Festival

=== Short fiction ===
- 2005 The Faeries in the Front Garden
- 2005 Night Trial
- 2005 The Abduction
- 2005 The Hill, published in the anthology, Thank You, Death Robot
- 2005 Two and a Half
- 2005 Athens 3004, published in the award-winning anthology, Silverthought: Ignition
- 2004 The Last Perfect Afternoon
- 2004 Tragedy at 12:02
- 2004 Summer
- 2004 Sitting on the Dock
