= Terry Wilson =

Terry Wilson may refer to:

== Sports ==
- Terry Wilson (quarterback) (born 1998), American football quarterback
- Terry Wilson (defensive back) (1942–2025), Canadian football player
- Terry Wilson (footballer, born 1959), Scottish footballer (Hibernian FC, Dunfermline Athletic FC)
- Terry Wilson (footballer, born 1969), Scottish footballer (Nottingham Forest FC)

== Others ==
- Terry Wilson (actor) (1923–1999), American actor
- Terry Wilson (musician) (born 1949), American bass player, record producer, and composer
- Terry Wilson (scientist) (born 1954), American Polar researcher
- Terry Wilson (police officer) (born 1964), Canadian retired police officer and hate crime investigator
- Terry Wilson (politician) (born 1964), American politician
