= Eduardo Castro-Wright =

Eduardo Castro-Wright is the former Vice Chairman and CEO of the Walmart’s Global eCommerce and Global Sourcing businesses, he retired on July 1, 2012. Castro-Wright previously was the president and CEO of Wal-Mart Stores USA, the United States division of the world's third largest corporation by revenue according to the 2008 Fortune 500.

== Childhood and family ==
Castro-Wright was born in Ecuador, the second oldest of eight siblings in a tightly knit retailing family. His grandfather founded a supermarket more than 50 years ago that became that nation's largest chain. He has three daughters with his wife Fabiola De Castro.

== Career ==
Castro-Wright graduated in 1975 from Texas A&M University with a degree in mechanical engineering. He rebuilt RJR Nabisco's Latin American operations during the KKR era. In the late 1990s, he ran all of the Asia-Pacific division for Honeywell. He then joined Walmart in 2001 as president and COO (Chief Operations Officer) of Walmart Mexico and was promoted to president and CEO, of Walmart Mexico in 2003. In 2004, Castro-Wright led sales of Wal-Mex's 700 outlets to rise 11 percent to $12.5 billion and net income to grow 36 percent. He also was COO for a short period until being named president and CEO of Walmart U.S. in 2005. He was promoted to Vice Chairman in 2008. In August 2010, he was named one of the Top 25 Multilatinos by Latin Business Chronicle.

On April 21, 2012, The New York Times reported that Castro-Wright was implicated in a vast corruption scheme while head of Walmart's Mexico unit. The Times reported that he approved paying millions of dollars in bribes to Mexican officials to secure quick approval of permits to build new stores.
