= Meryl Broussard =

American civil servant and executive (1950–2019)

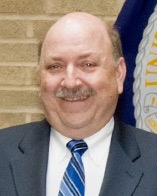
- Born: May 25, 1950; New Orleans, Louisiana
- Died: May 18, 2019 (aged 68); Vienna, Virginia
- Education: Ph.D., Texas A&M University, 1979
- Occupation: Civil servant
- Years active: 1980–2014
- Employer: U.S. Department of Agriculture
- Known for: Establishing National Institute of Food and Agriculture

Meryl C. Broussard Jr. (1950–2019) was an American civil servant and executive of the United States Department of Agriculture (USDA), in the National Institute of Food and Agriculture (NIFA). He was "the first full-time national program leader for aquaculture in USDA", and he was named an "Unsung Hero" of both NIFA and USDA. In 2015 he was inducted into the NIFA Hall of Fame.

== Early life and education ==
Brousard, the first child of Alice Ann and Meryl Broussard Sr., was born May 25, 1950, in New Orleans, Louisiana. He earned B.S and M.S. in Vertebrate Zoology from the University of Memphis. He earned a Ph.D. in Aquaculture from Texas A&M University. His dissertation was titled, The evaluation of four strains of channel catfish, Ictalurus punctatus, and intraspecific hybrids under aquacultural conditions.

== Career ==
In the 1980s Broussard was on the Texas A&M teaching staff, and was an aquaculture advisor in the Philippines on a USAID project. In a 1989 article in The New York Times on the rising popularity of cultivated catfish, Broussard said, ''It's a myth that only Southerners like it."

He became USDA’s first National Program Leader for Aquaculture. According to Jim L. Avery, president of the World Aquaculture Society (WAS), from 1996-1997 Broussard served as president of WAS, and he was "instrumental in establishing aquaculture as a presence within the USDA from the time he first joined the organization in 1985".

Broussard developed new university-based aquaculture research. He was promoted to Director of the Animal Systems Division in Cooperative State Research, Education, and Extension Service, (CSREES) and he led USDA's extramural research programs to develop sustainable livestock production systems. He then became the Deputy Administrator for Plant and Animal Systems within CSREES, leading the sustainable plant and livestock production systems science program.

Following the passage or the 2008 Farm Bill, Broussard led the establishment of the National Institute of Food and Agriculture (NIFA), a new agency within the USDA mandated by the bill. He was NIFA's first Deputy Director for Agriculture and Natural Resources, and in 2014 he became Associate Director for Programs, the agency's science portfolio. Broussard also led "a number of complex, highly visible, and politically sensitive programs established in the 2008 and 2014 Farm Bills. These programs included the Specialty Crop Research Initiative, the Organic Agriculture Research and Extension Initiative, the Beginning Farmers and Ranchers Initiative, the Biomass Research and Development Initiative and the Centers of Excellence and Commodity Board provisions."

== Publications ==
- Broussard Jr, M. C., & Simco, B. A. (1976). High-density culture of channel catfish in a recirculating system. The Progressive Fish-Culturist, 38(3), 138–141.
- Broussard, Meryl C.; Stickney, Robert R. (1981). "Evaluation of Reproductive Characters for Four Strains of Channel Catfish". Transactions of the American Fisheries Society. 110 (4): 502–506. Bibcode:1981TrAFS.110..502B. doi:10.1577/1548-8659(1981)110<502:EORCFF>2.0.CO;2. ISSN 1548-8659.
- Broussard Jr, M. C. (1991). Aquaculture: opportunities for the nineties. Journal of animal science, 69(10), 4221–4228.
- Broussard, Jr., M. C.; Reyes, C. G. (1985). "Cost analysis of a large-scale hatchery for the production of Oreochromis niloticus fingerlings in Central Luzon, Philippines".
