= Scott Mitchell (architect) =

American architect and author

- Born: February 2, 1971
- Education: Van High School (Texas) Texas A&M University, Southern California Institute of Architecture
- Known for: Architecture

Scott Mitchell is an American architectural designer and author. He is known for his architectural constructions for celebrities and also serves as an advisor with The Glass House. His monograph entitled "Scott Mitchell Houses” published by Rizzoli, has garnered critical acclaim and features contributions from Paul Goldberger, Calvin Klein, and Michael Webb.

== Early life and education ==
He was born on February 2, 1971, to Mike Harold and Sally Ann Mitchell, his father was a fighter pilot in the U.S. Air Force and, at one point, the assistant military attaché to the U.S. embassy in Amman, Jordan. He spent his childhood in different parts of the world, including Jordan, Japan, and the American Southwest.

Mitchell earned a Bachelor's degree in Environmental Design from Texas A&M University, and then relocated to New York, where he worked at Stephen Miller Siegel & Associates before moving to Bridgehampton to work with Preston T. Phillips.

Following this, he received an internship offer from Norman Foster's London office. Subsequently, he returned to the United States and pursued postgraduate studies at the Southern California Institute of Architecture.

== Career ==
While pursuing his postgraduate studies, he took on his first project —the renovation of a Beverly Hills home and established Scott Mitchell Studio in 1999.

His work has been inspired by architects such as Louis I. Kahn, especially his Salk Institute and the Kimbell Art Museum, and Kenzo Tange.

Mitchell's architectural projects, include residential and commercial buildings in different parts of the world, such as Melbourne, Hamptons, Seattle, and Malibu. He has worked on projects, like shingled houses in Beverly Hills and Long Island to villas in Malibu and a beachfront restaurant in Nobu Malibu.

Mitchell rebuilt and refurbished an estate in Malibu, which become the priciest California home sale ever worth $177 million purchase of a compound in Malibu by venture capitalist Marc Andreessen.

== Work and style ==
Mitchell has been influenced by the work of Rudolph M. Schindler.

Mitchell's architectural projects are known for their combination of light and materials. Soft, tactile textures are juxtaposed against concrete and other natural materials.

Mitchell's architectural designs intermix Contemporary architecture with geometrical elements.

Mitchell's known work includes his two Malibu houses; a low-slung structure made of concrete and glass. It was used as the set in the film Nocturnal Animals, directed by Tom Ford. Mitchell's designs balance contemporary, geometric architecture and a sense of understated comfort.

=== Scott Mitchell Houses ===
On May 9, 2020, Mitchell released his monograph entitled Scott Mitchell Houses, which features eight residential around the world.

He dedicated the book to his late friend, producer and talent manager Sandy Gallin, who died in 2017.

Mitchell met Gallin in the 1990s and began collaborating on his projects, leading to Mitchell opening his own studio in Los Angeles in 1999.

Among his clients have been Tom Brady and Gisele Bündchen, Larry Ellison, David Geffen, Jeffrey Katzenberg and Natalie Massenet.
