= Richard L. Cox =

American author

- Born: 1970 (age 55–56); Odessa, Texas, U.S.
- Education: Texas A&M University
- Occupation: Author
- Website: richardcox.net

Richard L. Cox (born 1970) is an American author. He has published four novels: Thomas World (2011) with Night Shade Books, Rift (2004), The God Particle (2005), and The Boys of Summer (2016) with The Random House Publishing Group. He currently resides in Tulsa, Oklahoma.

Cox was born in Odessa, Texas in 1970. He spent most of his youth in Texas, and also lived for a short time in Williston, North Dakota and New Orleans, Louisiana. In 1992 he graduated from Texas A&M University in College Station.

Cox began writing short stories at the age of eleven and started work on his first novel in 1993. Over the course of eight years he collected more than seventy rejections from literary agents before one finally agreed to represent Lightspeed in 2002. Lightspeed was eventually renamed Rift before being published in 2004, and his second novel, The God Particle, was published in 2005. Thomas World was published in 2011 and The Boys of Summer was published in 2016. Cox's novels are genre-bending stories that blend the mainstream thriller with speculative and science fiction.
