= Margaret Ann Withers =

American painter, sculptor and poet (born 1965)

Margaret Withers
- Born: December 16, 1965 (age 60); Austin, Texas
- Occupations: painter, artist
- Style: Contemporary
- Website: MargaretWithers.com

Margaret Withers (born December 16, 1965) is an American painter, sculptor and poet.

== Early life and education ==
Withers was born in Austin, Texas and received a BA in Literature from Texas A&M University in 2003. In 2004, she attended University of Colorado Boulder's MFA program but did not matriculate, deciding instead to move to New York City in 2006.

== Work ==
Withers is most recognized for her works on paper which are a hybrid mix of narrative, abstract and modern surrealism. Her paintings explore the conflicting ideas of joy and melancholy, as well as community and aloneness in regards to the concept of home and communication. Her online transliteration project is based on cultural shifts in the United States and debuted in 2014 at the New York Poetry Festival.

Withers' artwork is included in galleries, multiple private and corporate collections and received a 2013/2015 resident fellowship to the Vermont Studio Center, a fellowship to the Millay Colony, and a 2013 USA Project Grant.

She was named to the "50 Memorable Painters from 2015" list by Poets and Artists Magazine and was an Artist-in-Residence at Massachusetts Museum of Contemporary Art (MASS MoCA) in 2016.

She has been featured in or contributed to publications including The Drawing Papers, The Artist Catalogue, New England Review, Studio Visit magazine, and New American Paintings.

== Exhibitions ==
=== Solo exhibitions ===
- 2016 Adrift, G-Spot Contemporary Art Space, Houston, Texas
- 2015 Curious American Landscapes, in the Main Gallery at Port Washington Public Library
- 2013 One Mind’s Imagining into Another at Landau Gallery, Belmont, MA
- 2012 Painting the American Anti-Story at Arcilesi & Homberg Fine Art (AHA), Brooklyn, NY
- 2011 my pockets are full of you; Curator: Francesca Arcilesi Fine Art pop-up show, NY, NY
- 2010 feeling untethered I laid down my memories at Amos Eno Gallery, NY, NY
- 2006 ashy tongues whispering in smokey ears at Next Gallery, Denver, CO

=== Two Person Group Show ===
- 2013 Striations at G Gallery, curated by Diane Barber, Houston, Texas

=== Five-Six Person Group Shows ===
- 2017 The Plot Thickens, The Institute Library, New Haven, CT
- 2016 Something Else, The Painting Center, NY, NY
- 2014 La Bellone Fait Le Mur! Trésor Caché at La Bellone, Brussels, Belgium
- 2013 Abstraction at William Baczek Fine Art, Northampton, MA
- 2013 Connecting the Dots at ISE Cultural Foundation, curated by Lovina Purple NY, NY

=== Museum Exhibits (Group Shows) ===
- 2017 Inspirations, Hammond Museum & Japanese Garden, North Salem, NY
- 2015 36th Annual Exhibition, Monmouth Museum, Lincroft, NJ
- 2014 National Fall Exhibition, selected by Betti-Sue Hertz, Marin Museum of Contemporary Art, Novato, CA
- 2014 The Intuitionist curated by Lisa Sigal at The Drawing Center, NY, NY
- 2012 Remembering at Attleboro Arts Museum, Attleboro, MA
