= Payne Harrison =

American author (born 1948)

- Education: Texas A&M University (BA, MA); Southern Methodist University (MBA)
- Occupation: Author
- Writing career
- Genres: Mystery fiction; spy fiction; techno-thriller; military fiction

Payne Harrison (born 1948/'49) is an American author. Harrison is a New York Times bestselling writer, and author of five novels in the genres of mystery, espionage, techno-thriller and military.

== Bibliography ==
Harrison holds B.A. and M.A. degrees from Texas A&M University, and an M.B.A. from Southern Methodist University. He lives in Dallas, Texas and formerly worked as a newspaper reporter and business consultant. (Information found on back flap of Black Cipher book jacket. Credits: Crown Publishing, Inc., New York, NY)

== Novels ==
- Storming Intrepid (Crown Publishing), 1989, 531 pages, ISBN 0-8041-0553-7
- The Thunder of Erebus (Crown Publishing), 1991, ISBN 0-517-11678-2
- Black Cipher (Crown Publishing), 1994, 337 pages, ISBN 0-517-58753-X
- Forbidden Summit (Crown Publishing), 1997, 340 pages, ISBN 0-425-16214-1
- Eurostorm (Variance Publishing), 2010, 326 pages, ISBN 978-1-935142-14-0
- Longitude Lost (Overflight Press), 2019, 665 pages, ISBN 0-578-45766-0
