= Thomas Bredlow =

American master blacksmith and metal designer

- Born: 1934 (age 91–92); Pontiac, Michigan
- Other names: Thomas "Tom" Bredlow

Thomas Bredlow (born 1934) is an American master blacksmith, iron artist, metal designer, historian and philosopher who was a significant figure in the mid- to late-20th century ironwork revival in the American southwest. He was self taught and instrumental in reviving classical blacksmithing techniques and traditions. During his active career, he developed an impressive artistic style and forged iron sculptures that would come to typify southwestern and American ironwork of the 20th century. His national commissions included gates and other art objects for the National Cathedral in Washington, DC, and public work in Arizona.

== Early life and education ==
Tom Bredlow was born in Pontiac, Michigan in 1934 to parents of German and French descent. His father William K. Bredlow, who worked in advertising, and mother Elizabeth La Ponsa had three children, Tom, Anthony and Jo Ann.

Bredlow was raised in Texas. His grandfather had worked as a tinsmith and the young Bredlow was gifted his tools at a young age. In a 1972 newspaper profile the author noted, “When other kids were asking for bicycles and cowboy outfits, the only thing he wanted was an anvil. Now he has five and uses all of them.” Bredlow saw his first anvil in the Marx Brothers Movie “A Night at the Opera,” and was certain that iron work was his path. He tried unsuccessfully to apprentice with a local blacksmith so instead he embarked on a self education path studying the work of Samuel Yellin.

Bredlow attended Texas A&M University to study philosophy and literature. While in school Bredlow became interested in folklore and was associated with the Brazos Folklore Society and served as president of the university Arts and Science Council. During this period he participated in public lectures including presenting “Ghost Stories from a Texas Town.”

Bredlow enrolled in a masters program at the University of Arizona and began taking machinist classes through the physics department. Bredlow collected Blacksmith tools and after college began to pursue the trade professionally.

== Blacksmithing and metal design ==
Bredlow opened his first shop in 1964. It was a partnership called “Bredlow and Sawicki.” Walter Sawicki was an educator and the first president of the International Designers Guild. The first paying customer ordered a door knocker. The partnership was short lived and by 1965 Bredlow had opened his own studio-shop in Plaza Antigua at Campbell Avenue and Limberlost Drive in Tucson, Arizona called “Tom Bredlow Blacksmith”. From the studio he sold Andirons, Fire Screens, and other ornamental objects. The sound of his hammer at his forge was a constant in the shop plaza.

During this period he specialized in reproducing metal products used “on the Arizona frontier” and developed an iron rose that would become a hallmark of his work. In 1966, Bredlow participated in a gallery show at the DeGrazia Studio, at 3568 Campbell Avenue with Cornelius Fiske, Gene Thorn, Natalie Norris, Nick DeGrazia and Madeline Nachriner.

In March 1967 his work “Stagecoach” and “Desert Birds” were exhibited at the Boyer Gallery, in Tucson. The Boyer would become his principal gallery representative for the next decade. In July he presented a Coyote at the gallery and in October a Roadrunner.

In 1967 Bredlow was commissioned to produce a large hand forged stair-railing and Gate for the Arizona Mortuary at 3rd and Stone in Tucson. The local Arizona newspapers began to recognize that his work was art more than function and produced a number of profile articles that raised his notoriety.

In December 1968, Cele Peterson, a noted fashion designer and personality, held a Bredlow exhibition at her downtown store and showroom. Bredlow at the time of the exhibit described his work as, “plain and ornamental forgings.” In 1970 the Boyer Gallery again presented the exhibition “little animals” of his figure work. The Tucson Daily Citizen wrote, “Bredlow is a mathematician, a machinist and student of the lore and heritage of the old West. A blacksmith with a scholarly turn, Bredlow draws inspiration from ethnic, contemporary, ancient Chinese and Spanish Colonial examples of wrought iron work. [...] Brewlow’s affinity for animals is reflected in his current exhibition at the Boyer.” The works presented were titled, “Quail 3,” "Chow Stretch,” “Owl, 1” “Owl, 2” “Coyote”, "Sow Stalk,” “Hmmm, Tasty” and 11 others. P. Nevitt, vice president of the Paine Art Center and Gardens in Oshkosh, Wisconsin contributed an essay for the 1969 exhibition catalog.

In the summer of 1970, after a completing commission replacing a stolen candlestick, created by Samuel Yellin, for the Washington National Cathedral, Bredlow was commissioned to create the first pair of gates for the landmark structure. In 1971 he traveled to Washington to oversee the installation of the first gates and while there, he received a second commission for a gate in passageway to a balcony.

In 1972 he was commissioned to create another pair of iron gates for the cathedral, the project took four months. The same year the Bahti Gallery at 1706 East Speedway commissioned Bredlow to create an ornamental iron work screen across the facade of the store in Southwestern Petroglyph figure motif.

Bredlow’s interviews reveal a tongue-in-cheek intellectual elitism while framing his craft and his artistic work as a proletariat. At the same time recognizing the collective revival of blacksmithing in Tucson in the late 20th century. He noted “My contention is that tucson is an ironworker center and has been since when the railroads came.”

His master style and remarkable skill almost seem to mold iron like clay. When asked about his technique in an interview in 1972 he replied “Well, you just heat it and moosh it around like clay.” The paper described the process. “In making an iron leaf he fired up his foge, thrust in a bar of hot-rolled steel and when it was glowing hot picked up one of the heavy hammers and set to work. A period of heating, pounding, shaping and bending, and two delicate leaves appeared finally to be attached to the flower stem, and then forge welded to an iron bar. When finished, no joint is visible and the bar appears to have spouted flowers and leaves. Bredlow noted, “the success of a piece of iron is determined more by its appropriateness than by who did it or what method they used.”

In 1975 he created a handcrafted candle stand as a wedding ornament for the daughter of noted 20th Century weaver, and fiber artist Ruth Brown. In 1976 he completed a third commission for the National Cathedral and in 1977 Bredlow’s work was included in the exhibit “Solid Wrought / U.S.A.,” mounted by the New York Museum of Contemporary Crafts and later displayed at the Renwick Gallery. He was noted in national syndicated articles highlighting the best of the exhibition including features in the Christian Science Monitor and New York Times.

In 1979 Bredlow was a featured artist in the Tubac Center for the Arts exhibition. He received a forth commission in 1979 for additional gates at the National Cathedral. For the National Cathedral he completed seven gates, a pair of handrails, two flower stands and the initial candlestick.

In 1981 Steve Nanini commissioned a work titled “People Play” now exhibited at Rillito Park on North First Avenue and River Road in Tucson. Kelly Rollings, who parched, saved and rebuilt dozens of buildings in the Barrio Viejo Historic District commissioned Bredlow to create a number of works integrated into his buildings. These included the animal bars across from the Theatro Carmen, interior details for the Cushing Street Bar and Restaurant. During this period he completed handrails and a waterless fountain in front of the Territorial Bank on North Oracle Road and a SunDial at Colossal Cave Mountain Park.

In the early 1980s, Bredlow, was hired to repair a number of features in Mary Colter’s Grand Canyon, National Historic Landmark Buildings for the Fred Harvey Company. Repairs at the Hermit’s Rest included: dragon head-handled fireplace tongs (1982), Made and installed a missing section of punched zinc for lamp at the lamppost (1984), Installed a screen within the Great Room chimney (1985).

== Legacy ==
Bredlow continued to produce work into the early 2000s before his retirement and became somewhat of a recluse. He continues to live in Tucson, Arizona.
