= Mavis Kelsey =

American physician

Mavis Parrott Kelsey Sr. (October 7, 1912 – November 12, 2013) was an American internist and one of the founders of the Kelsey-Seybold Clinic in 1949, now a large, multi-specialty clinic system located in the metro area of Houston, Texas. Kelsey received his Bachelor of Science degree from the Agricultural and Mechanical College of Texas (now Texas A&M University) in 1932. He attended medical school at the University of Texas Medical Branch in Galveston receiving his Doctor of Medicine degree in 1936.
