= John Henry Kinealy =

American engineer

John Henry Kinealy (March 18, 1864 in Hannibal, Missouri–1928) was an American mechanical engineer.

He was educated in the public schools of St. Louis and at Washington University (M.E., 1884), where he was an instructor in 1886-87 and professor of mechanical engineering from 1892 to 1902. He taught also at the Agricultural and Mechanical College of Texas (1887–89) and at the North Carolina College of Agriculture and Mechanical Arts (1889–92). He was a consulting engineer at Boston in 1902-04 and thereafter a mechanical engineer and patent expert at St. Louis. His own patents include an air-purifying apparatus, a thermal valve, a damper regulator, and other devices using the Kinealy metal diaphragm. He published:

- An Elementary Text-Book on Steam Engines and Boilers (1895; fourth edition, 1903)
- Charts for Low Pressure Steam Heating (1896)
- Formulas and Tables for Heating (1899)
- Slide Valve Simply Explained (1899)
- Centrifugal Fans (1905)
- Mechanical Draft (1906)
