= Corporate Council on Africa =

The Corporate Council on Africa (CCA) is a trade association focusing on strengthening commercial relationships between the United States and the African continent.

== History ==
The Corporate Council on Africa (CCA), based in Washington D.C., is a nonprofit, membership-based organization established in 1993 to promote business and investment between the United States and the nations of Africa. CCA is the premier American organization devoted to U.S.-Africa business relations and includes as members more than 180 companies, which represent nearly 85 percent of total U.S. private sector investments in Africa. CCA’s members range from America’s smallest to largest corporations. They represent a diverse pool of industries from more than 20 key sectors, including agribusiness, energy, infrastructure, security, power, healthcare, telecommunications and finance.

Jeff Sturchio serves as chairman of the Corporate Council on Africa.

The Corporate Council on Africa is a leading source of the most up-to-date information on business across Africa. CCA works closely with governments, multilateral groups and businesses to improve the continent’s trade and investment climate, and to raise Africa’s profile in the U.S. business community. Most importantly, CCA works with member companies to help them increase their investment in and trade with the nations of Africa. CCA accomplishes these goals through a number of sector- and country-specific working groups, initiatives, research areas, forums, conferences and advocacy programs.

In 2019 CCA held the U.S-Africa Business Summit in Maputo, Mozambique. Since its inception in 1997, the summit has been the essential conference on U.S.-Africa business.

== The U.S.-Africa Business Center ==
The U.S.-Africa Business Center (USABC) is a program at The Corporate Council on Africa funded by the U.S. Agency for International Development in 2010 to help creating partnerships between U.S. and African businesses. USABC works to increase two-way trade and investment between the United States and sub-Saharan African economies, with a focus on small- and medium-size enterprises (SMEs), as well as larger corporations. USABC places special emphasis on promoting American investments in Africa’s strategic agricultural value chains.

Target countries for USABC include Ethiopia, Ghana, Kenya, Nigeria and South Africa. Unlike other initiatives, USABC identifies both reliable African partners for U.S. firms seeking to market products and services in Africa and U.S. buyers for African firms wishing to sell to the United States through the African Growth and Opportunities Act (AGOA).

USABC also helps familiarize US energy companies and investors to connect with local African businesses in the energy sector.

In October 2013 USABC organized a roundtable at the US-Africa Business Summit in Chicago to connect African countries.

== The Board of Directors ==
The Board of Directors in 2022/2023 was:

*Jeffrey L. Sturchio (Chairman - 2024)

*Olugbenga Agboola

*Jean Raymond Boulle (Vice Chairman)

*Nneka Chime

*Mohamad Darwish

*Akin Dawodu

*Samuel Dossou-Aworet

*J. Hunter Farris

*Salvador Pérez Galindo

*Stephen Hayes (President Emeritus)

*Paul Hinks

*Temitope Iluyemi
