= Burnstein =

Burnstein is a surname. Notable people with the surname include:

- Ann Burnstein, American bridge player
- Eugene Burnstein, American social psychologist

== See also ==
- Burnstein-Malin Grocery, a building in Des Moines, Iowa, United States
- Gary Burnstein Community Health Clinic, a clinic in Pontiac, Michigan, United States
- Bernstein
