= Ray Bartkus =

Lithuanian artist

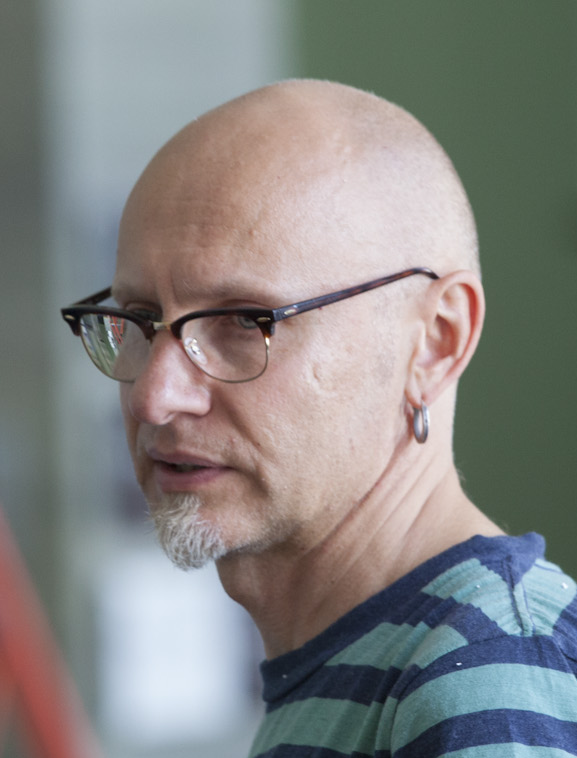
- Bartkus in 2015
- Born: Rimvydas Bartkus; July 6, 1961 (age 65); Vilnius, Lithuania
- Education: Vilnius Academy of Art
- Known for: Illustration, painting, drawing, installation art

Ray Bartkus (born 1961, in Vilnius) is a Lithuanian-American artist. His work spans numerous mediums, including illustrations, hyperrealist paintings, and large-scale installations. He is known as the founder of MaLonNY, an annual art festival in Marijampolė, and as the designer of the Lithuanian 50 Litas bill. His works have been acquired by the National Portrait Gallery, the Lithuanian National Gallery of Art, the MO Museum, and the Noewe Foundation.

== Illustrations ==
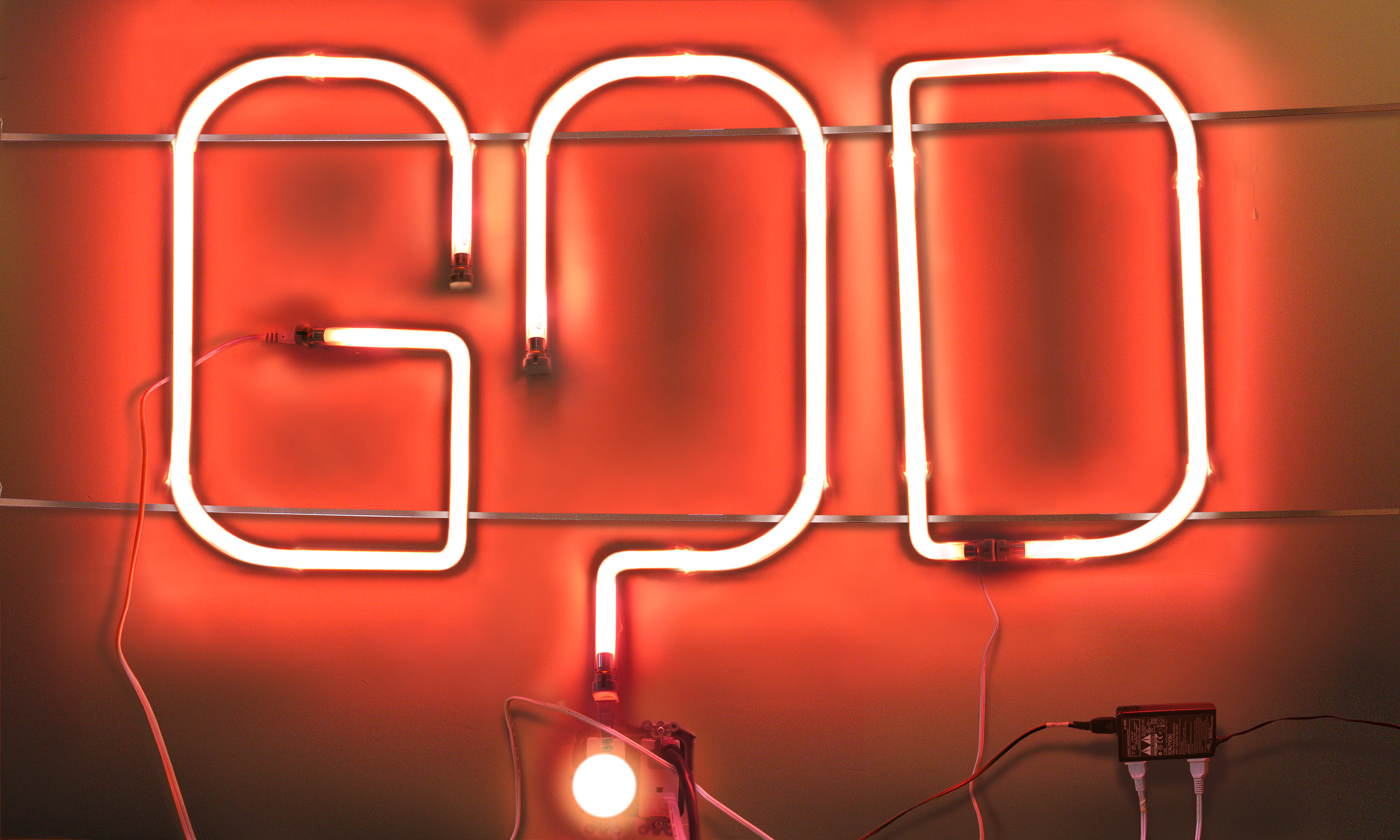
G?D, New York Times Book Review cover illustration, October 22, 2006

In 1991, shortly after emigrating to New York City, Bartkus began working as an illustrator for numerous publications, including The New York Times Book Review, Harper's Magazine, the Wall Street Journal and Time magazine. Former New York Times Art Director Steven Heller described Bartkus’ illustrations as combining elements of both realism and surrealism, while also noting Bartkus’ ability to constantly shift styles. Bartkus ascribed his creative flexibility to growing up amid the “single-mindedness of a communist state,” which led him to prize the freedom offered by multiple perspectives. His illustrations have received numerous awards from the Society of Publication Designers, the Society of Newspaper Designers, and the Society of Illustrators.

== MaLonNY ==
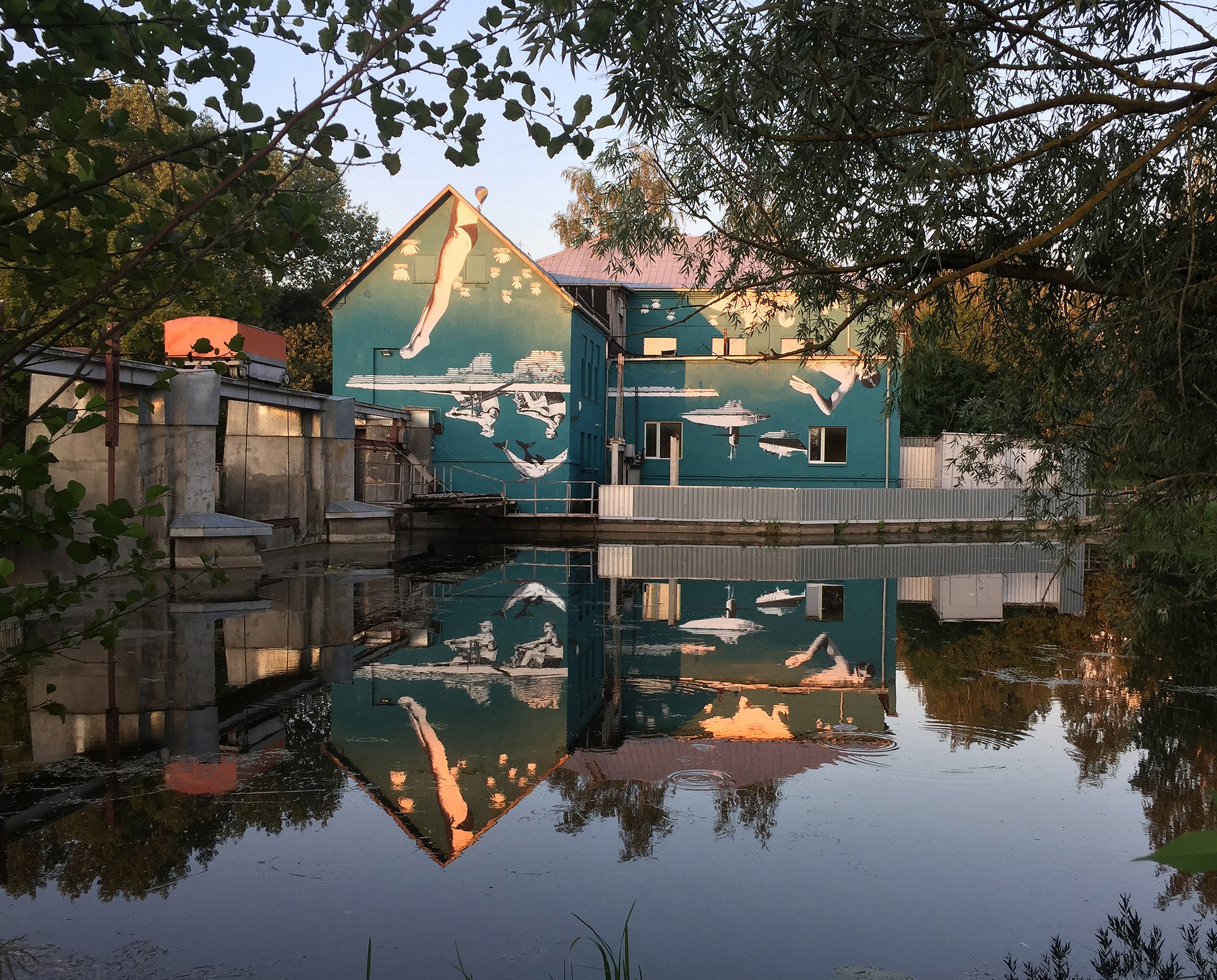
Floating World, 2015, Marijampolė, Lithuania

In 2014, Bartkus launched MaLonNY (which stands for Marijampolė, London, and New York), an ongoing street art and music festival and creative symposium held annually in the Lithuanian city of Marijampolė. Over ten years, MaLonNY has turned Marijampolė into a center for Lithuanian street art, with contributions from international and Lithuanian artists such as Judy Tuwaletstiwa, Žilvinas Kempinas, Stasys Eidrigevičius, Mike Estabrook, The Bubble Process, Lou Beach, Ieva Martinaitytė-Mediodia, Oleksandr Shatokhin, Philip Grisewood, Kacper Dolatowski, and others. MaLonNY has also featured musical performances by Electric Djinn, Daddy Was A Milkman, and Fast Forward, among others. One of Bartkus’ murals for the event, “Floating World,” has been widely shared online because of how it was painted to reflect in the river below it.

== Paintings ==
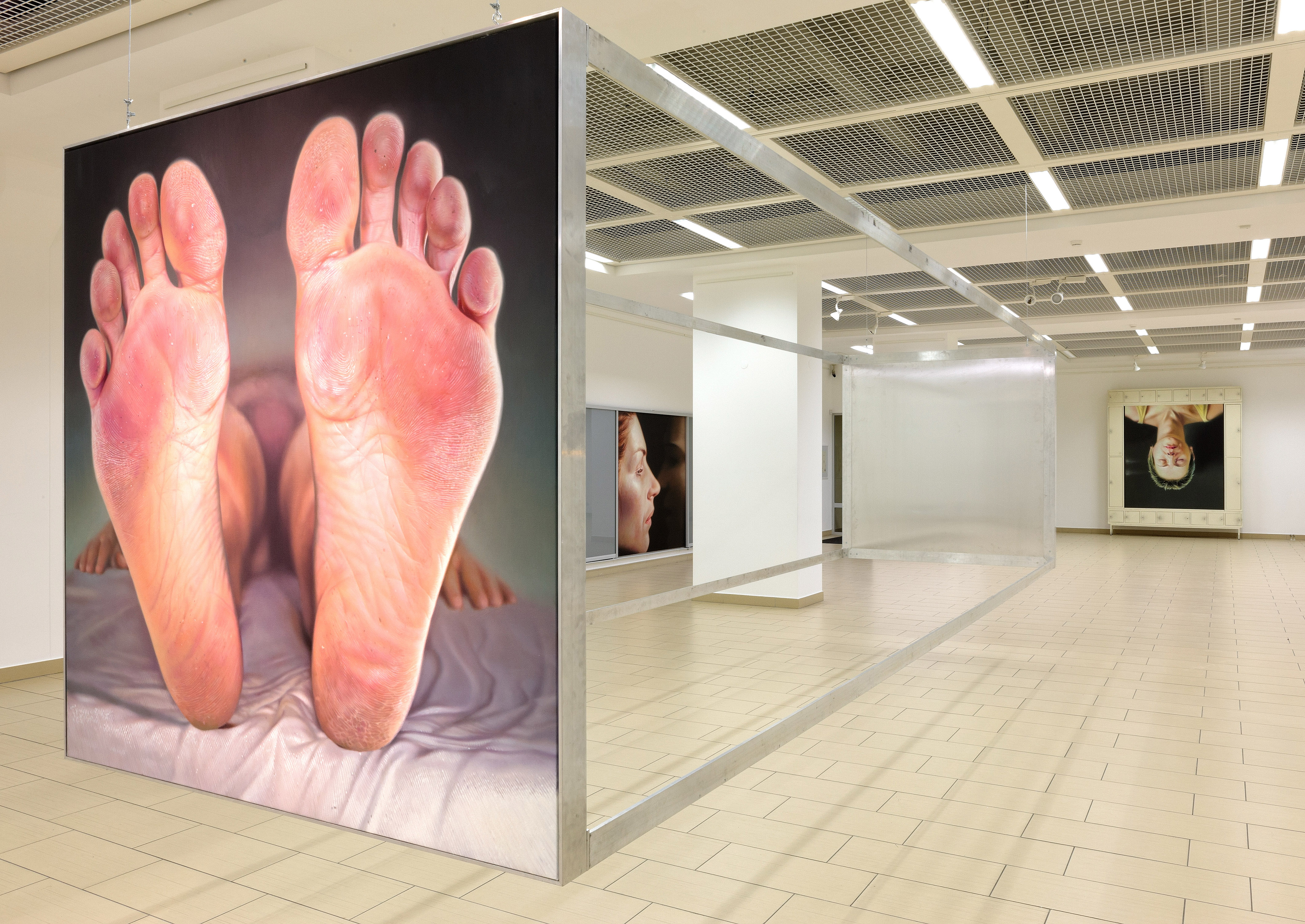
Balance and other works, 2008, Vartai Gallery

Bartkus has established himself as a hyperrealist painter. One of his series, “Last Paintings,” engaged in a dialogue with the works of Pre-Raphaelite painters, attempting to produce a more contemporary art by returning to earlier artistic principles. Another of his series, “Forgeries,” reproduced official documents from Bartkus’ life with humorous and meta-artistic touches. These works have been exhibited in the US, Lithuania, Poland, Austria, Japan, and the Netherlands, and have been selected to represent Lithuania in a 2025 exhibition on hyperrealist art organized by Hyp’Art in France.

== Installations ==
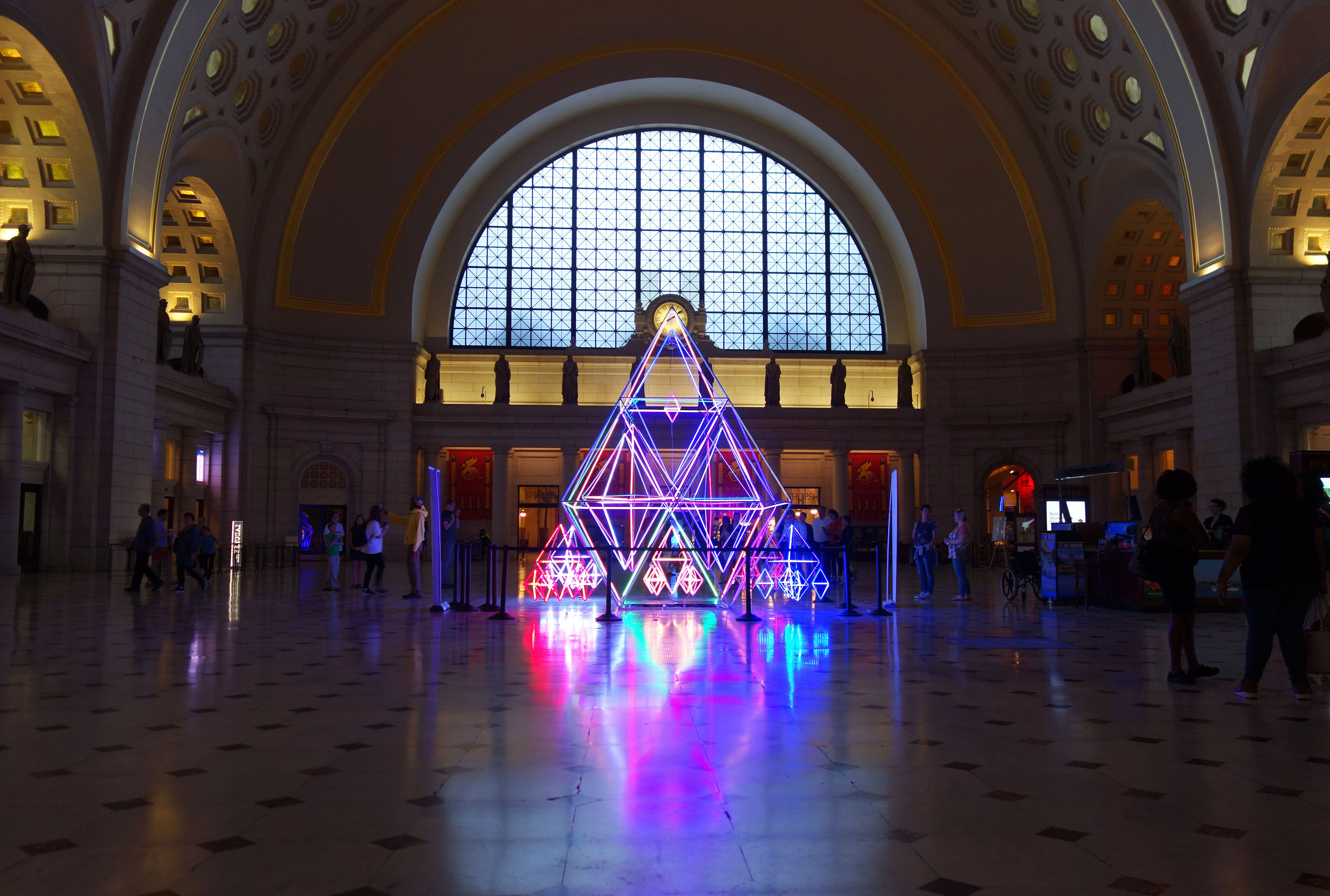
Gardens, 2018, Union Station, Washington, D.C.

Bartkus began creating large-scale public installations in 2014, when he created a work titled “Landing Strip” to inaugurate the annual meeting of the World Lithuanian Youth Association. Over the next three four years, his installations were featured at the United Nations building in New York City, the International Peace Institute Salzburg Forum, and Union Station in Washington, D.C. One of Bartkus’ installations, titled “Gardens,” was commissioned by the Lithuanian Embassy to commemorate 100 years of Lithuania's independence. The design of this piece was based on traditional Lithuanian straw mobile folk art. It was exhibited in several cities across the United States, including Washington D.C., Chicago, Philadelphia, and New York City, and later was shown at the Lithuanian National Gallery of Art in Vilnius and the Samogitian Art Museum. In 2024, Bartkus created “Infinity,” a series of portraits made using wire mesh and 100 kilograms of nails.

== Proposed Holocaust Memorial ==
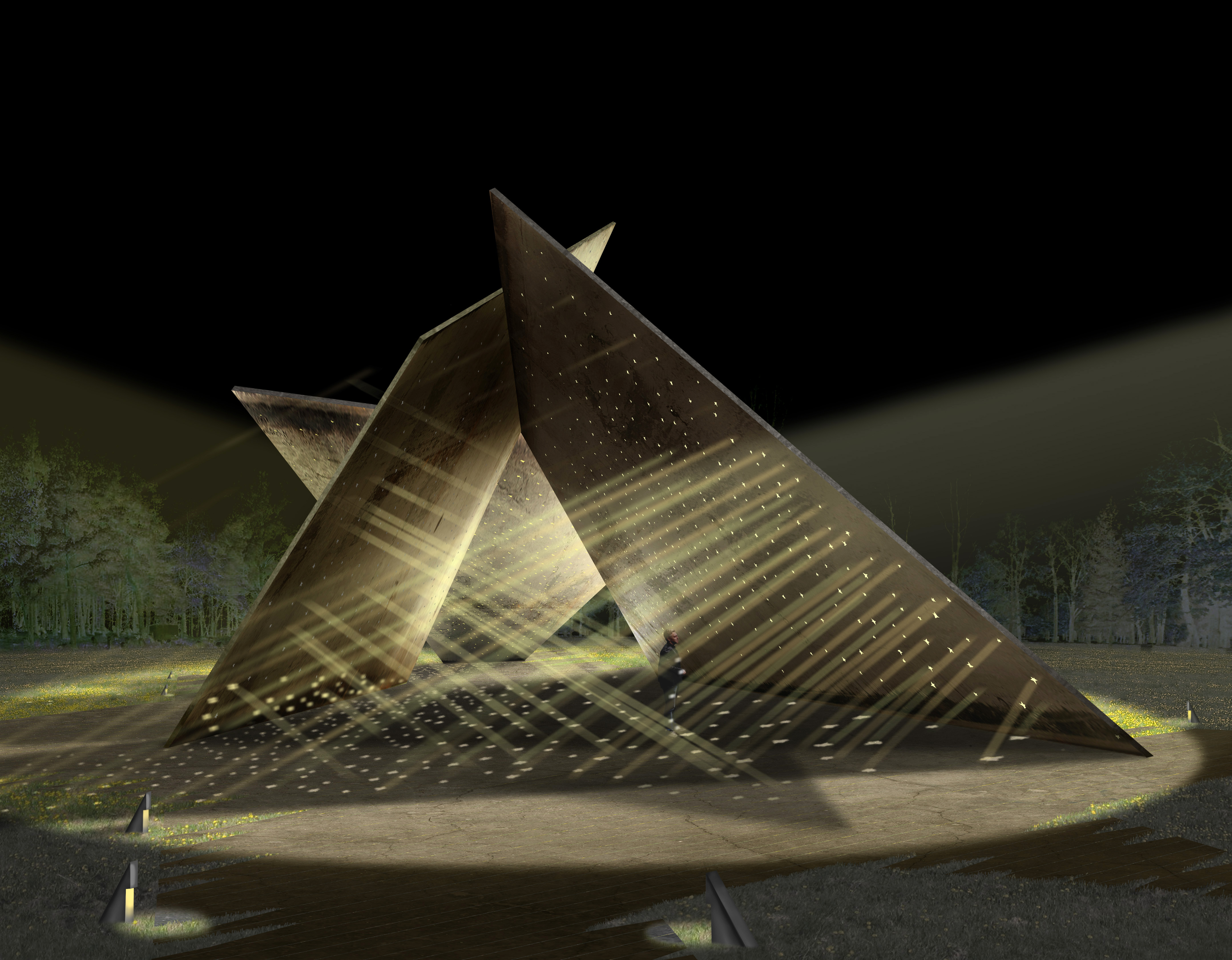
Rendering of Ray Bartkus' proposed Holocaust Memorial

Since 2017, Bartkus has advocated for the creation of a memorial that acknowledges the Holocaust in Lithuania. He has made numerous public appearances wearing a “Holocaust Memorial, Lithuania” t-shirt to raise awareness for this issue. He has worked to create dialogue on this issue between the Lithuanian Jewish Association, the American Jewish Committee, and the Vilnius mayor's office, among other groups.

== See also ==
- List of Lithuanian artists
- List of Lithuanian painters
