= Wallace E. Holland =

American politician (1926–1998)

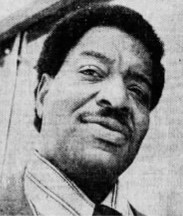

Mayor of Pontiac, Michigan
- In office 1974–1986
- Preceded by: Robert F. Jackson
- Succeeded by: Walter L. Moore
- In office 1990–1994
- Preceded by: Walter L. Moore
- Succeeded by: Charlie Harrison Jr.

City Council of Pontiac, Michigan
- In office 1970–1974

Personal details
- Born: Wallace E. Holland; 1926
- Died: 1998 (age 71)
- Party: Democratic

Wallace E. Holland (1926–1998) was an American politician who served as the first African-American mayor of Pontiac, Michigan, the county seat of Oakland County

== Biography ==
Holland was born in 1926. He was elected to the City Council of Pontiac, Michigan and then was named by the council as mayor in 1974. He was continuously appointed as mayor by the City Council through 1982. After the city changed its government to a strong mayor form of government, he won the general election in 1981 beginning his term in 1982. In the 1985 general election, he was defeated by Walter L. Moore before returning the favor and defeating Moore in the 1989 general election. In 1993, he was defeated in the primaries by state representative Charlie Harrison Jr. and former mayor Walter Moore. Voters were upset over the large budget deficit, high crime rates, and a declining population. Harrison would go on to win serving from 1994 until his death in 1995.

He died in 1998 at the age of 71 due to complications from diabetes.

== See also ==
- List of first African-American mayors
