= Pontiac, Michigan =

- City
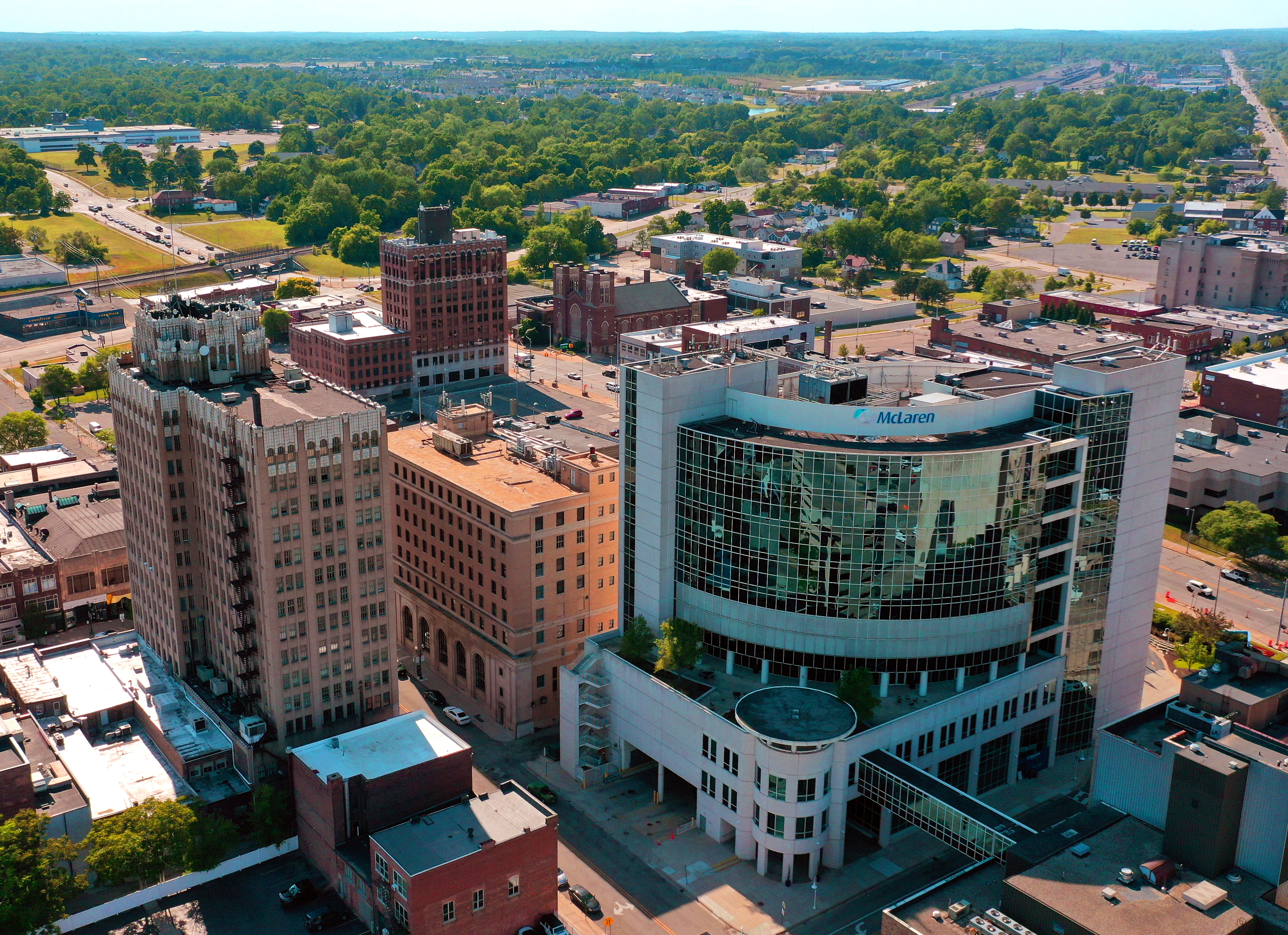
- Downtown Pontiac

- Seal
- Nicknames: The Yak, Yaktown
- Interactive map of Pontiac, Michigan
- Location within Michigan Location within the United States
- Coordinates: 42°38′46″N 83°17′33″W
- Country: United States
- State: Michigan
- County: Oakland
- Settled: 1818
- Incorporated: 1837 (village); 1861 (city)
- Named for: Pontiac

Government
  - Type: Mayor–council
  - Mayor: Mike McGuinness
  - Clerk: Garland Doyle

Area
  - City: 20.25 sq mi (52.46 km^{2})
  - Land: 19.88 sq mi (51.50 km^{2})
  - Water: 0.37 sq mi (0.95 km^{2})
- Elevation: 922 ft (281 m)

Population (2020)
  - City: 61,606
  - Density: 3,098.0/sq mi (1,196.16/km^{2})
  - Metro: 4,296,250 (Metro Detroit)
- Time zone: UTC−5 (Eastern (EST))
  - Summer (DST): UTC−4 (EDT)
- ZIP Codes: 48340,48341,48342
- Area codes: 248 and 947
- FIPS code: 26-65440
- GNIS feature ID: 0635224
- Website: pontiac.mi.us

Pontiac (/ˈpɒn(t)iæk/ PON-(t)ee-ak) is a city in and the county seat of Oakland County in the U.S. state of Michigan. Located roughly 26 miles (41.8 km) northwest of downtown Detroit, Pontiac is part of the Detroit metropolitan area, and is variously described as a satellite city or suburb of Detroit. As of the 2020 census, the city had a population of 61,606.

Founded in 1818, Pontiac was the second European-American organized settlement in what is now Metro Detroit, after Dearborn. It was named after Obwaandi'eyaag (Pontiac), a war chief of the Odawa, who occupied the area before the European settlers. The city was known for its multiple General Motors automobile manufacturing facilities in the 20th century, which were the basis of its economy and contributed to the wealth of the region. GM's operations in Pontiac included Fisher Body, Pontiac East Assembly (a.k.a. Truck & Coach/Bus), which manufactured GMC products, the Oakland Motor Car Company, and the Pontiac Motor Division, which produced cars under the namesake Pontiac brand.

Pontiac was also home to the Pontiac Silverdome, a stadium which was home to the Detroit Lions of the National Football League from 1975 until 2001.

== History ==
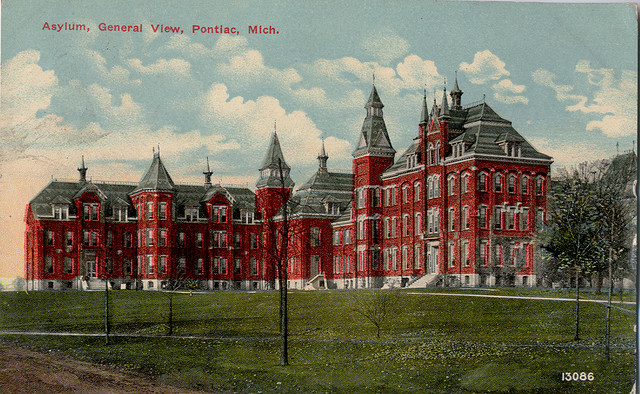
The Pontiac State Hospital, c. 1912

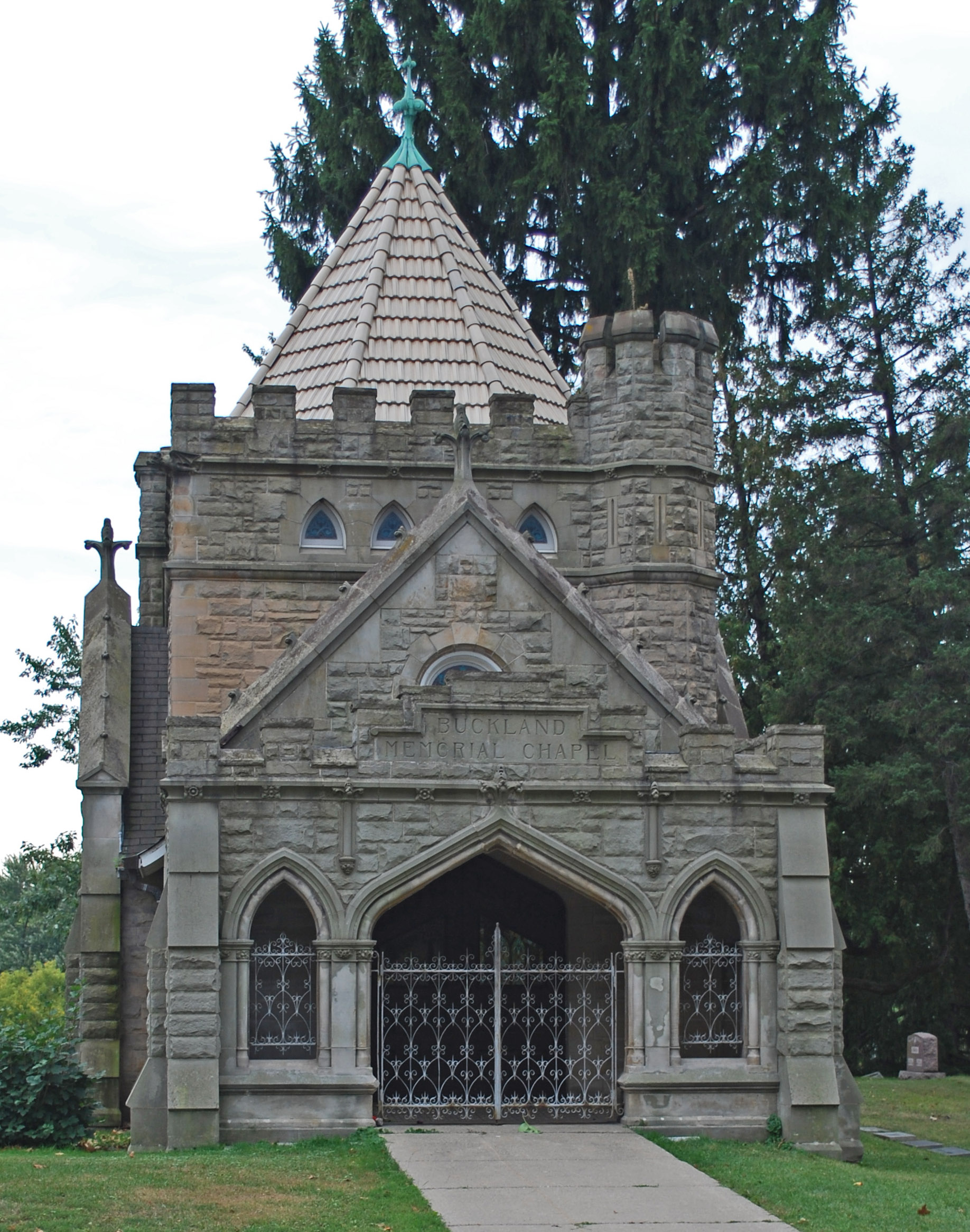
Buckland Memorial Chapel at Oak Hill Cemetery

Present-day Pontiac, Michigan was traversed for thousands of years by indigenous peoples due to the confluence of the Saginaw Trail and the Nottawassippi River; the river's indigenous name was replaced with the Clinton River name by settlers coming from New York State, where DeWitt Clinton served as Governor. The Saginaw Trail was an important land trail route for indigenous peoples that ran from the Saginaw Bay in Michigan to the Detroit River in present-day Detroit.

Early European expeditions into the land north of Detroit described the area as having "extreme sterility and barrenness". Developments and exploration were soon to prove that report false.

The first European-American settlers arrived in what is now the city of Pontiac in 1818. They followed the Saginaw Trail north from Detroit and determined the settlement should be where the trail and the river crossed. Two years later the fledgling settlement was designated as the county seat for Oakland County, due in part to the Michigan Territorial Governor Lewis Cass being receptive to the lobbying of The Pontiac Company's members that their recently acquired property was ideal for the county seat location.

The Pontiac Company, consisting of 15 members and chaired by Solomon Sibley of Detroit, comprised the first landowners in Pontiac. Sibley, along with Stephen Mack and Shubael Conant, Pontiac Company members, also formed the partnership Mack, Conant & Sibley to develop a town. Solomon and his wife Sarah Sibley largely financed construction of the first buildings. While Solomon was the first chair of the Pontiac Company, for two years Sarah Sibley was the most active as the go-between with settlers at Pontiac. Solomon Sibley was constantly traveling as a Territorial Congressman and later a Territorial Supreme Court judge. The Sibley-Hoyt house, thought to be one of the first structures in Pontiac, is preserved by its private owner.

In the 1820s Elizabeth Denison, an unmarried, free black woman, worked for the Sibleys. They helped her buy land in Pontiac in 1825. Stephen Mack, agent for the Pontiac Company, signed the deed at the request of the Sibleys, conveying 48.5 acres to Elizabeth Denison. She is believed to be the first black woman to purchase land in the new territory of Michigan.

In 1837 Pontiac became a village, the same year that Michigan gained statehood. The town had been named after the noted Odawa chief who had his headquarters in the area decades before, during the resistance to European-American encroachment. Founded on the Clinton River, Pontiac was Michigan's first inland settlement. Rivers were critical to settlements as transportation ways, in addition to providing water and, later, power.

The village was incorporated by the legislature as a city in 1861. From the beginning, Pontiac's central location served it well. It attracted professional people, including doctors and lawyers, and soon became a center of industry. Woolen and grist mills made use of the Clinton River as a power source.

Abundant natural resources led to the establishment of several carriage manufacturing companies, all of which were thriving at the turn of the 20th century. One of the largest carriage manufacturing companies in Pontiac of that era was the O.J. Beaudette Wagon Works, which made bodies for carriages and then transitioned to manufacturing bodies for automobiles. At that time, the first self-propelled vehicles were introduced. Pontiac quickly became a capital of the new automotive industry.

Throughout the 1910s and 1920s, Pontiac had tremendous growth in its population and size as tens of thousands of prospective autoworkers moved here from the South to work in its GM auto assembly plants at Pontiac Assembly. African Americans came in the Great Migration, seeking work, education, and the chance to vote and escape the oppression of Jim Crow in the South.

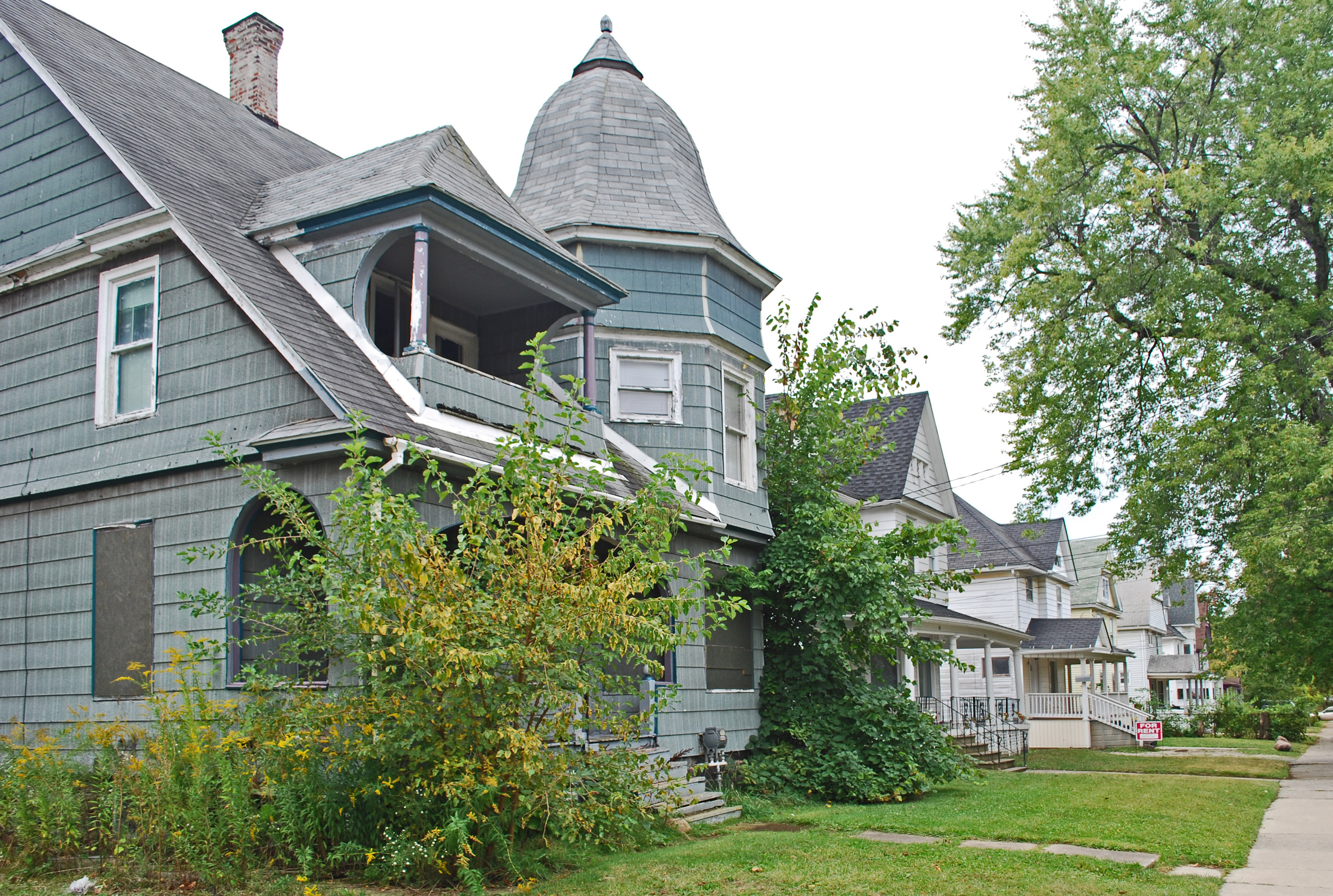
Houses in the Fairgrove Avenue Historic District

As the small "horseless carriage" manufacturers became consolidated under the mantle of the General Motors Corporation, Pontiac grew as the industry grew. It also suffered the same setbacks as other cities during the Great Depression years of the 1930s. The buildup of the defense industry and conversion of the automotive industry to war demands increased the need for labor. Pontiac was a pivotal concentration of wartime production for the United States in World War II. Among many other vehicles and weapons, Pontiac facilities produced thousands of GMC trucks, Oerlikon anti-aircraft guns, naval torpedoes, tank axles, amphibious vehicles, and munitions.

The first postwar years after World War II were a time of prosperity, and continued migration of African Americans to the city in the second wave of the Great Migration, but the city changed as suburbs were developed and people commuted by car to work. The more established residents moved out to buy newer housing being built in the suburbs, draining off business and resulting in vacancies downtown. Racist policies and racial animus toward the growing African American population was also an important factor, and until the mid-1960s with the enactment of Fair Housing ordinances, most of the properties in Pontiac neighborhoods contained racially restrictive covenants in the deeds.

In order to prevent flooding, Pontiac confined the Clinton River in concrete through the downtown in 1963. Changing ideas about urban living in the early 21st century prompted the city to study uncovering the river to create a waterfront community in the city.

In late 1966, Pontiac-born real estate developer A. Alfred Taubman tried to build a large-scale shopping mall on vacant downtown land (where the Phoenix Center now stands). It was unsuccessful. Pontiac resident C. Don Davidson and his University of Detroit architectural class created a more comprehensive plan for development to benefit the city and the entire region around it. In 1969, the city of Pontiac adopted the Pontiac Plan as the official plan for rebuilding the vacant area of the downtown district.

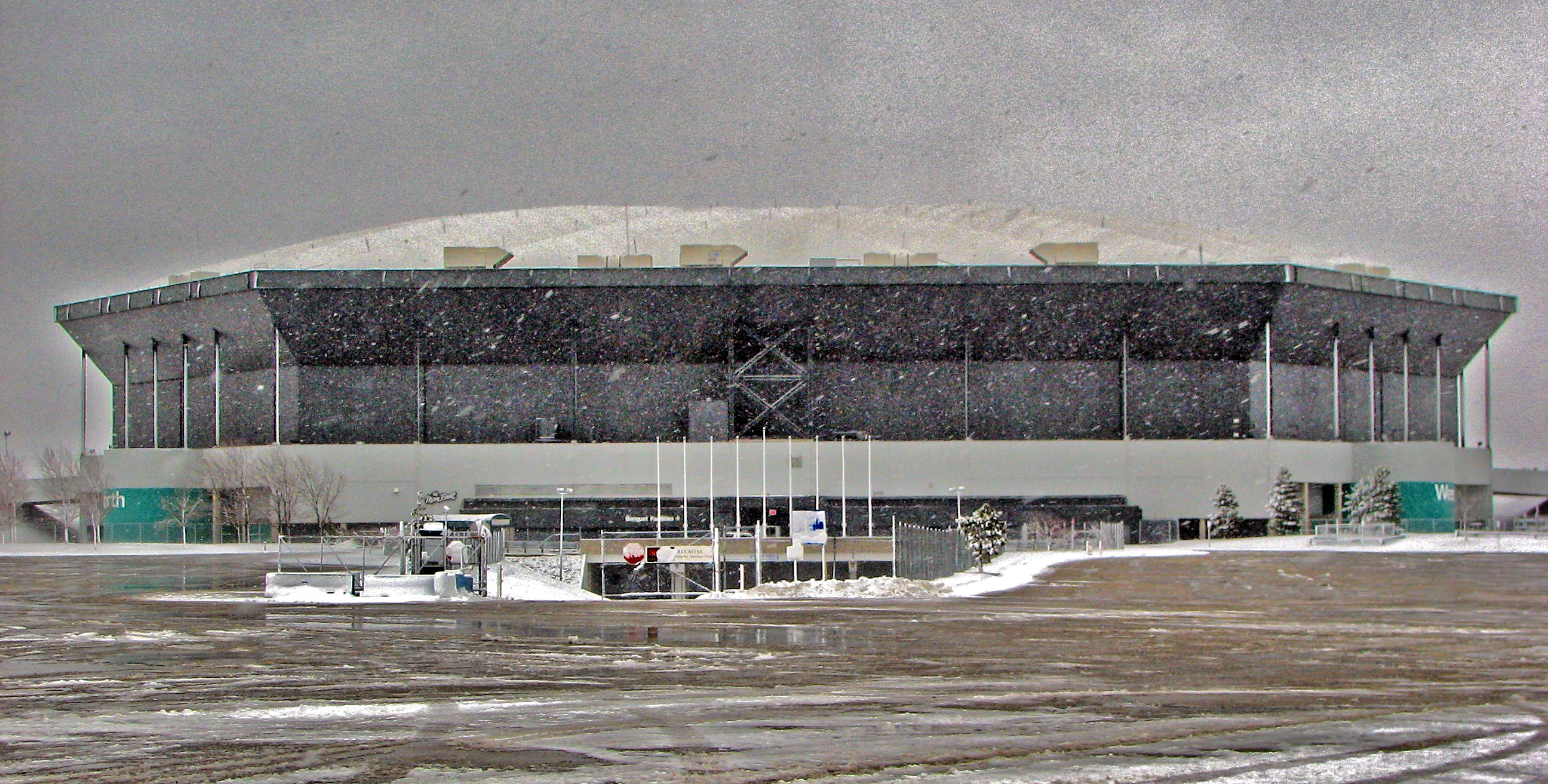
The Pontiac Silverdome in 2006

In 1965, Davidson overheard news that the Detroit Lions were seeking a new football stadium in Southeast Michigan. Davidson and city leaders made a push to develop a new multi-purpose stadium, which was built and became known as the Silverdome. Construction began on the 80,000-seat stadium in 1972 and it opened in 1975 as the Pontiac Metropolitan Stadium.

This was a part of Davidson's vision for Pontiac. Besides becoming the new home stadium of the NFL's Detroit Lions, NBA's Detroit Pistons and USFL's Michigan Panthers, the arena hosted such events as the 1979 NBA All-Star Game, the 1982 Super Bowl XVI game between the San Francisco 49ers and Cincinnati Bengals, and four matches of soccer's 1994 World Cup.

In 1968 there was an outbreak of a flu-like disease called Pontiac fever. After the discovery of the bacterium Legionella pneumophila in 1976 in Philadelphia, blood specimens from 1968 were re-examined and the same bacterium was found.

On August 30, 1971, ten school buses were destroyed in a bombing during white resistance to a federal court order to desegregate the city's public schools.

Construction began in the 1970s on an urban renewal project known as the "Pontiac Plan". The initial phase of this plan included the Phoenix Center, three office buildings, a transportation center, and a high-rise residential complex. The remainder of the plan was never completed. The city has struggled with declining population since 1980, due to industrial restructuring and the loss of jobs, especially in the automotive industry.

=== Emergency financial manager ===
From 2009 through 2013, Pontiac was under the oversight of an Emergency Financial Manager appointed by the state government. The Emergency Manager was authorized to make day-to-day executive and financial municipal decisions. The position was not subject to the usual checks and balances, nor to election. The first and second managers, Fred Leeb and Michael Stampfler, were appointed by Michigan Governor Jennifer Granholm. The third manager was Louis Schimmel, who was appointed by Governor Rick Snyder.

In order to balance the budget, state-appointed emergency managers drastically revised labor union contracts with the city, sold off city assets such as parking meters, and privatized most public services. The Oakland County Sheriff's Office handles all police (saving $2 million a year) and nearby Waterford township has responsibility for fire protection (saving $3 million). Pontiac sold its water treatment plant for $55 million, and outsources garbage collection, animal control, vital records and street maintenance. Many people working in City Hall are employed by contractors. The city payroll has declined from 600 to 50 employees. The Silverdome Stadium, once valued at $22 million, was sold for $583,000, and subsequently demolished in December 2017. The emergency managers reduced the city's annual spending to $36 million from $57 million, and erased almost all of its long-term debt.

In August 2013, Schimmel resigned as Emergency Financial Manager. Schimmel now serves as part of the four-member Transition Advisory Board for the city. Other members of the board include Deputy Oakland County Executive Bob Daddow, Rochester Hills Finance Director Keith Sawdon, and Ed Karyzno, administrator of the Michigan Department of Treasury's Office of Financial Responsibility.

In July 2012, Mayor Leon Jukowski and Emergency Financial Manager Louis Schimmel announced plans to demolish the Phoenix Center. Its vacancy rates were high, and the city did not want to continue the high maintenance costs. New thinking about downtown was to re-emphasize the street grid; the city wanted to reconnect Saginaw Street to the downtown area. Owners of the connecting Ottawa Towers filed an injunction, claiming the demolition would devalue their property and result in lost parking. In December 2012, a judge granted an injunction for the Ottawa Towers on an "expedited calendar", which prevented the demolition of the Phoenix Center for the time being.

In 2010, city leaders and business owners had launched "The Rise of The Phoenix" initiative. This plan was intended to attract businesses interested in downtown retail space. The applicants selected would be given free rent in exchange for multi-year leases (two years or more) as well as one year of free parking in city lots. Some 52 new businesses were recruited to locate in downtown Pontiac, bringing new life to the city. Plans for the development of mixed-use and loft flats in downtown were announced in September 2011 by the Michigan Economic Growth Authority (MEGA). MEGA estimates the development could generate $20.4 million in new investment and create up to 107 permanent full-time jobs in downtown. The development was to be supported by a state tax break.

On January 26, 2012, West Construction Services began the renovation and restoration of the former Sears building for the Lafayette Place Lofts, the largest construction investment in Downtown Pontiac in approximately 30 years. The 80,000-square-foot (7,400 m^{2}) project is a Leadership in Energy and Environmental Design (LEED) certified residential and commercial mixed-use development: it will have 46 new urban rental lofts, a fresh food grocery store and café, and a fitness center. Construction was completed during 2012, and the lofts and market opened in December of that year. 10 West Lofts, another development in the area, will bring more residents to downtown Pontiac.

== Geography ==
According to the United States Census Bureau, the city has a total area of 20.29 square miles (52.55 km^{2}), of which 19.97 square miles (51.72 km^{2}) is land and 0.32 square miles (0.83 km^{2}) (1.58%) is water.

Pontiac is bounded by the city of Auburn Hills to the east and north, the city of Lake Angelus to the north, Waterford Township to the west, and Bloomfield Township to the south.

The former Pontiac Township included what are now the cities of Pontiac, Lake Angelus, and Auburn Hills. The last remaining portion of the township incorporated as the city of Auburn Hills in 1983. Although the township no longer exists as a civil entity, it is still used as a survey township for land use purposes.

== Demographics ==
Historical population
Census	Pop.	Note	%±
1840	1,904		—
1850	1,681		−11.7%
1860	2,575		53.2%
1870	4,867		89.0%
1880	4,509		−7.4%
1890	6,200		37.5%
1900	9,769		57.6%
1910	14,532		48.8%
1920	34,273		135.8%
1930	64,928		89.4%
1940	66,626		2.6%
1950	73,681		10.6%
1960	82,223		11.6%
1970	85,279		3.7%
1980	76,715		−10.0%
1990	71,166		−7.2%
2000	66,337		−6.8%
2010	59,515		−10.3%
2020	61,606		3.5%
2025 (est.)	62,077		0.8%
U.S. Decennial Census; 2010-2020

=== Racial and ethnic composition ===
Pontiac city, Michigan – Racial and ethnic composition Note: the US Census treats Hispanic/Latino as an ethnic category. This table excludes Latinos from the racial categories and assigns them to a separate category. Hispanics/Latinos may be of any race.
Race / Ethnicity (NH = Non-Hispanic)	Pop 2000	Pop 2010	Pop 2020	% 2000	% 2010	% 2020
White alone (NH)	22,875	15,815	14,448	34.48%	26.57%	23.45%
Black or African American alone (NH)	31,416	30,384	29,046	47.36%	51.05%	47.15%
Native American or Alaska Native alone (NH)	275	242	176	0.41%	0.41%	0.29%
Asian alone (NH)	1,576	1,359	1,408	2.38%	2.28%	2.29%
Native Hawaiian or Pacific Islander alone (NH)	12	2	13	0.02%	0.00%	0.02%
Other race alone (NH)	109	69	295	0.16%	0.12%	0.48%
Mixed race or Multiracial (NH)	1,611	1,809	2,763	2.43%	3.04%	4.48%
Hispanic or Latino (any race)	8,463	9,835	13,457	12.76%	16.53%	21.84%
Total	66,337	59,515	61,606	100.00%	100.00%	100.00%

=== 2020 census ===
As of the 2020 census, Pontiac had a population of 61,606. The median age was 33.8 years. 25.6% of residents were under the age of 18 and 11.7% of residents were 65 years of age or older. For every 100 females there were 96.8 males, and for every 100 females age 18 and over there were 95.1 males age 18 and over.

100.0% of residents lived in urban areas, while 0.0% lived in rural areas.

There were 23,993 households in Pontiac, of which 31.1% had children under the age of 18 living in them. Of all households, 23.4% were married-couple households, 26.2% were households with a male householder and no spouse or partner present, and 41.8% were households with a female householder and no spouse or partner present. About 34.9% of all households were made up of individuals and 11.0% had someone living alone who was 65 years of age or older.

There were 26,253 housing units, of which 8.6% were vacant. The homeowner vacancy rate was 1.8% and the rental vacancy rate was 7.1%.

Racial composition as of the 2020 census
Race	Number	Percent
White	16,940	27.5%
Black or African American	29,702	48.2%
American Indian and Alaska Native	457	0.7%
Asian	1,427	2.3%
Native Hawaiian and Other Pacific Islander	13	0.0%
Some other race	6,862	11.1%
Two or more races	6,205	10.1%

=== 2010 census ===
As of the census of 2010, there were 59,515 people, 22,220 households, and 13,365 families residing in the city. The population density was 2,980.2 inhabitants per square mile (1,150.7/km^{2}). There were 27,084 housing units at an average density of 1,356.2 per square mile (523.6/km^{2}). The racial makeup of the city was 34.4% White, 52.1% African American, 0.6% Native American, 2.3% Asian, 6.2% from other races, and 4.5% from two or more races. Hispanic or Latino residents of any race were 16.5% of the population.

There were 22,220 households, of which 35.7% had children under the age of 18 living with them, 26.4% were married couples living together, 27.0% had a female householder with no husband present, 6.7% had a male householder with no wife present, and 39.9% were non-families. 33.1% of all households were made up of individuals, and 8.7% had someone living alone who was 65 years of age or older. The average household size was 2.56 and the average family size was 3.28.

The median age in the city was 33.4 years. 27.2% of residents were under the age of 18; 11.2% were between the ages of 18 and 24; 28.2% were from 25 to 44; 24.2% were from 45 to 64; and 9.3% were 65 years of age or older. The gender makeup of the city was 49.1% male and 50.9% female.

=== 2000 census ===
As of 2000, the median income for a household in the city was $31,207, and the median income for a family was $36,391. Males had a median income of $31,961 versus $24,765 for females. The per capita income for the city was $15,842. About 18.0% of families and 22.1% of the population were below the poverty line, including 29.3% of those under age 18 and 15.7% of those age 65 or over.

== Culture ==
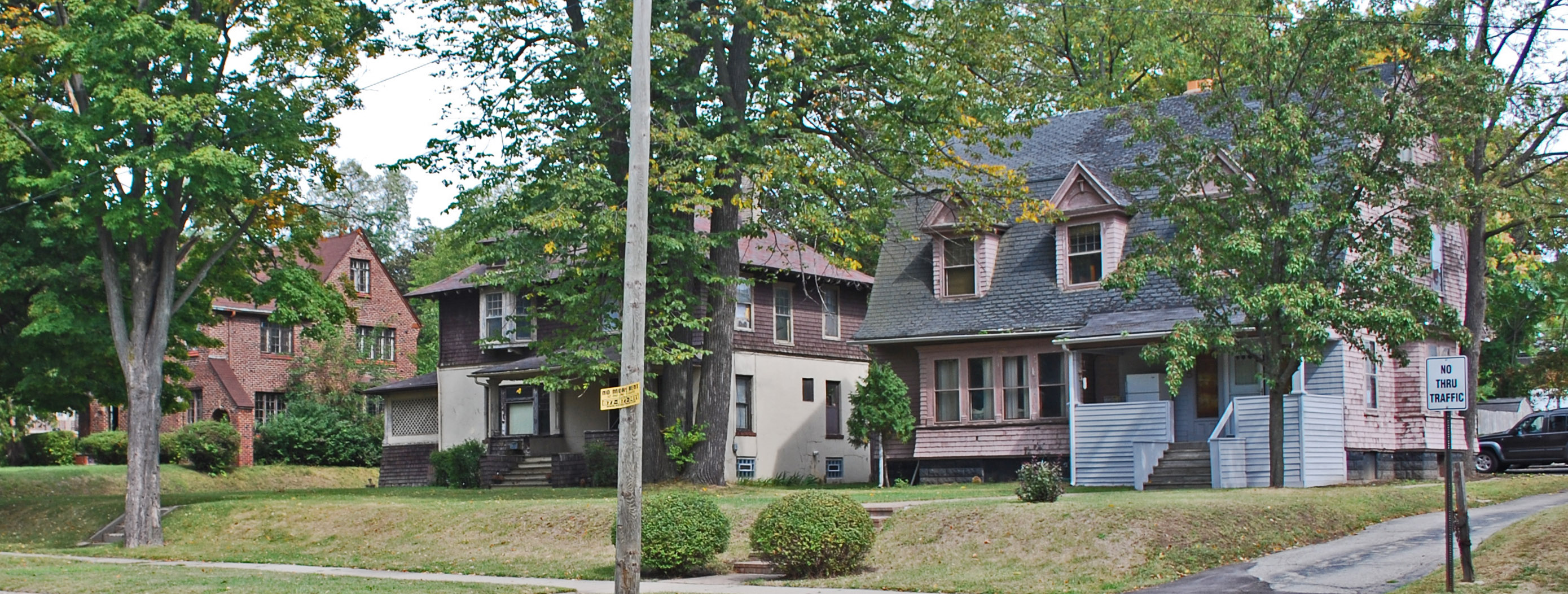
Franklin Boulevard Historic District

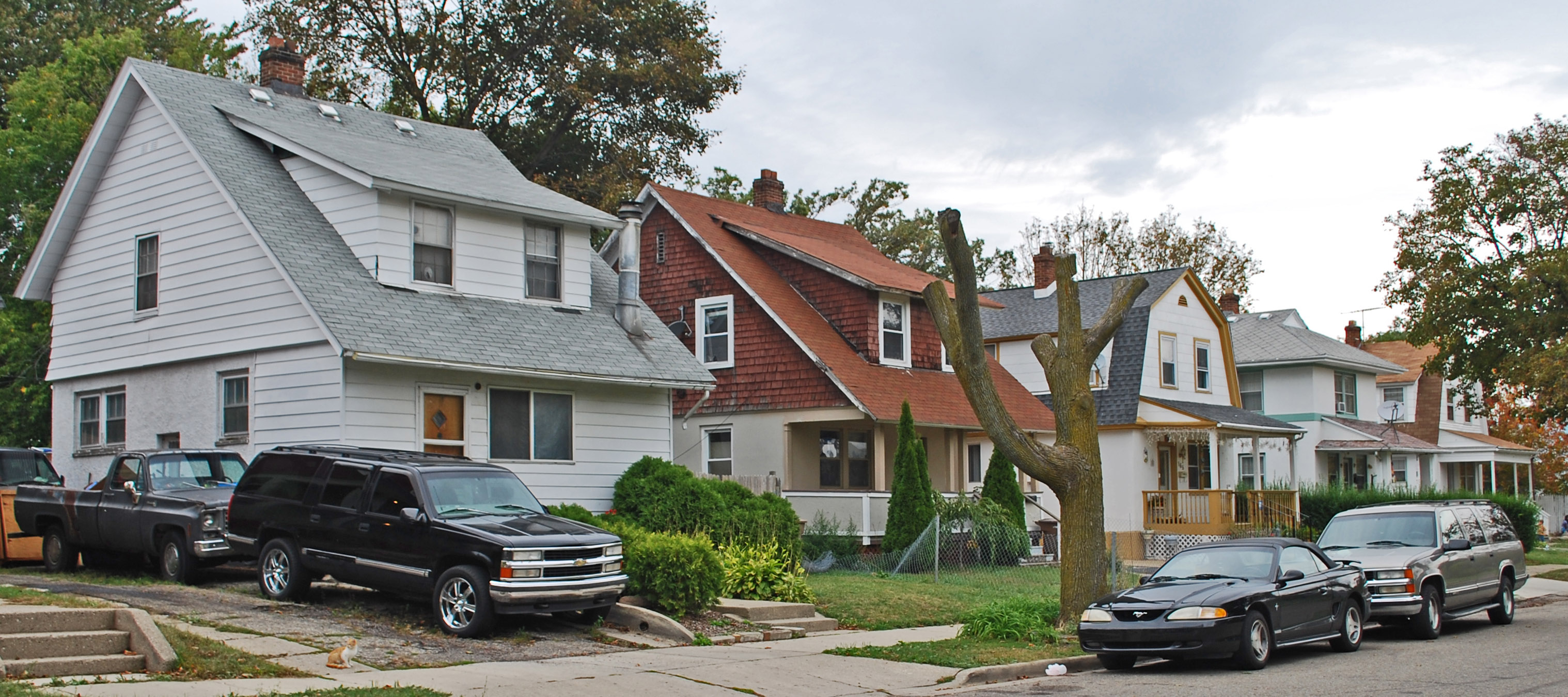
Modern Housing Corporation Addition Historic District

Regionally, the city was known for the Arts, Beats and Eats Festival, a widely attended summer festival featuring an art show, musical concert venues, and a sampling of food from numerous regional restaurants. In 2010, the festival was moved to nearby Royal Oak. The First Annual Scheme Cruise was held September 6, 2015, an event sponsored by the Scheme Street Battle League. The event combined rap battles, basketball competitions, and a car show. Pontiac officials are considering relocating the event to the downtown area of the city.

The city is at the north end of the famous Woodward Avenue, which extends as a major boulevard into Detroit. It was originally lined with mansions and prestigious businesses. In the 1950s and 1960s it was popular with young people who would "cruise" and drag-race their hot-rods in the area. Pontiac participates in the annual Woodward Dream Cruise, an event celebrating Woodward's hot-rod history, with a parade of cars stretching from Detroit to Pontiac.

The city hosts two nationally renowned haunted houses: The Realm of Darkness and Erebus. The Realm of Darkness has in previous years been chosen as America's Best Haunted House. Erebus held the world record from 2005 to 2009 for "Largest Haunted House"; it is 4 stories high.

Pontiac was an early location of movie making, with the Raleigh Michigan Studios, renamed as the Motown Motion Picture Studios. Scenes of the 2012 remake of the film Red Dawn were filmed in Pontiac and other Michigan locations, recreating Spokane, Washington. Additionally, downtown Pontiac in August 2012 was the filming site for the tornado-themed disaster movie Into the Storm. The 2013 fantasy adventure film Oz the Great and Powerful was filmed at Motown Motion Picture Studios. Transformers: Age of Extinction is the latest movie to be filmed within the studio, with the bulk of filming taking place in Pontiac.

Pontiac is home to the Michigan Fallen Heroes Memorial. It is located within the Oakland County Government Complex off Telegraph Road.

== Government ==
=== Government form ===
- 1837 - Incorporated as a village by an act of the Michigan Legislature. The first election was held in the same year and voters elected to be governed by a seven member board of trustees.
- 1861 - The State of Michigan redesignated Pontiac as a city which adopted the mayor-council form of government with the city divided into five wards with two aldermen elected from each ward and the mayor elected at large.
- 1911 - The city adopted a new charter providing for a commission form of government consisting of a mayor and two commissioners elected by the city at large on a nonpartisan basis each to three year terms of office.
- 1920 - The city adopted a new charter providing for a commission-manager form of government consisting of seven commissioners elected by the city at large on a nonpartisan basis and a mayor elected by one of the seven to act as mayor.
- 1982 - The city adopted a new charter providing for a strong-mayor form of government consisting of seven commissioners and a mayor elected by the city at large on a nonpartisan basis for 4-year terms

=== Mayor ===
The mayor of Pontiac is Mike McGuinness; his four-year term began in January 2026.

The city of Pontiac operates under a strong mayor system. The mayor serves as the chief executive of the city while holding all responsibilities of the city's executive branch. These responsibilities include proposing a city budget, ensuring that all laws are followed accordingly, as well as delivering a State of the City address. The Pontiac mayor also is responsible for appointing several positions in office including deputy mayor as well as overseeing the law, financial, police, and fire departments.

==== Mayoral history ====
Wallace E. Holland (1974–1986 and 1990–1994) was the first African American elected as Mayor of Pontiac, and the first directly elected Mayor following the adoption of the revised Pontiac City Charter in 1982.

Deirdre Holloway Waterman, was an ophthalmologist who was elected as Pontiac's first female mayor by more than 68% of the vote on November 5, 2013. She was re-elected in 2017 with 57% of the vote. Her late husband, William Waterman, was a prominent attorney in the community who was appointed in 1988 by Michigan Governor James Blanchard to the District Court in Pontiac and elected multiple times to continue serving; he died in office in 2003. The District Courthouse was renamed in his honor, the William J. Waterman Hall of Justice. Then-incumbent Mayor Deirdre Waterman was removed from the August primary ballot due to unresolved campaign finance violations, but continued as a write-in candidate in the primary election. She was not successful in that effort.

In November 2021, Tim Greimel, who previously served as a Michigan State Representative and Oakland County Commissioner in districts that included Pontiac, was elected Mayor in the general election. He won with 61.66% of votes, while his general election opponent Alexandria T. Riley received 37.50% of the vote. Riley, a frequent candidate for office in Pontiac, previously served as a city employee under Mayor Deirdre Waterman and more recent worked for the Genesee County Land Bank Authority.

==== List of past Mayors of Pontiac ====
Mayors of Pontiac, Michigan

Image	Mayor	Years	Notes
	Harry Mitchell	1932–1933	Resigned April 1933
	Frank B. Ruf	1933–1936	
	F. Homer Newton	1936–1937	
	Victor E. Nelson	1937–1938	Appointed mayor after the resignation of his predecessor in January 1937
	James C. Mahar†	1938–1939	Died in office, August 1939
	Samuel G. Backus	1939–1940	
	George W. Booth	1940–1942	
	Joseph H. Potts†	1942–1943	Died in office
	Phillip R. Sauer	1943–1944	
	Arthur J. Law	1944–1948	
	John C. Cowe	1948–1949	Resigned in August 1949
	J. H. Patrick Glynn	1949–1950	Picked by the council after his predecessor resigned
	John H. Ridgway	1950–1952	
	Arthur J. Law (2nd term)	1952–1954	
	William W. Donaldson	1954–1958	
	Philip E. Rowston	1958–1962	
	Robert A. Landry	1962–1964	
	William H. Taylor	1964–1970	
	Robert F. Jackson	1970–1974	Negotiated the relocation of the Detroit Lions to Pontiac
	Wallace E. Holland	1974–1986	First African-American mayor
	Walter L. Moore	1986–1990	
	Wallace E. Holland (2nd term)	1990–1994	
	Charlie Harrison Jr.†	1994–1995	Former 62nd district Michigan state representative (1974–1994); Died in office in 1995.
	Walter L. Moore (2nd term)	1995–1998; 1998–2002	Appointed to complete Harrison's term
	Willie J. Payne	2002–2006	
	Clarence Phillips	2006–2010	
	Leon Jukowski	2010–2014	
	Deirdre Holloway Waterman	2014–2022	First female and first female African-American mayor
	Tim Greimel	2022–2026	
	Mike McGuinness	2026-present	

=== City Council ===
District	Member	In office since
1	Chris Jackson	2026
2	Milanna Jones	2024
3	Mikal Goodman	2021
4	Kathalee James	2022
5	William A. Carrington	2022 (Note: Carrington has served on Council since 2021, but has only represented this district since 2025.)
6	Regina Campbell	2026
At-Large	Adrian Austin	2026

=== Federal, state, and county legislators ===
United States House of Representatives
District	Representative	Party	Since
11th	Haley Stevens	Democratic	2023 (Note: Stevens has represented the 11th district since 2019, but the district has only included Pontiac since 2023.)

Michigan Senate
District	Senator	Party	Since
7th	Jeremy Moss	Democratic	2023

Michigan House of Representatives
District	Representative	Party	Since
53rd	Brenda Carter	Democratic	2019

Oakland County Board of Commissioners
District	Commissioner	Party	Since
9	Angela Powell	Democratic	2021
10	Kirsten Nelson	Democratic	2019

=== City Tax ===
The city levies an income tax of 1 percent on residents and 0.5 percent on nonresidents.

=== Pontiac Library ===
As of 2024, the Pontiac library board consists of Rosie Richardson (chairperson), Yvette Brinker Marion (vice chairperson), Mattie Mckinney Hatchett (treasurer), Angela Allen (secretary), and H. Bill Maxey (trustee).

=== Oakland County Service Center ===
The East Campus of the Oakland County Service Center is located in Pontiac. It includes the county courthouse and jail for adults.

== Education ==
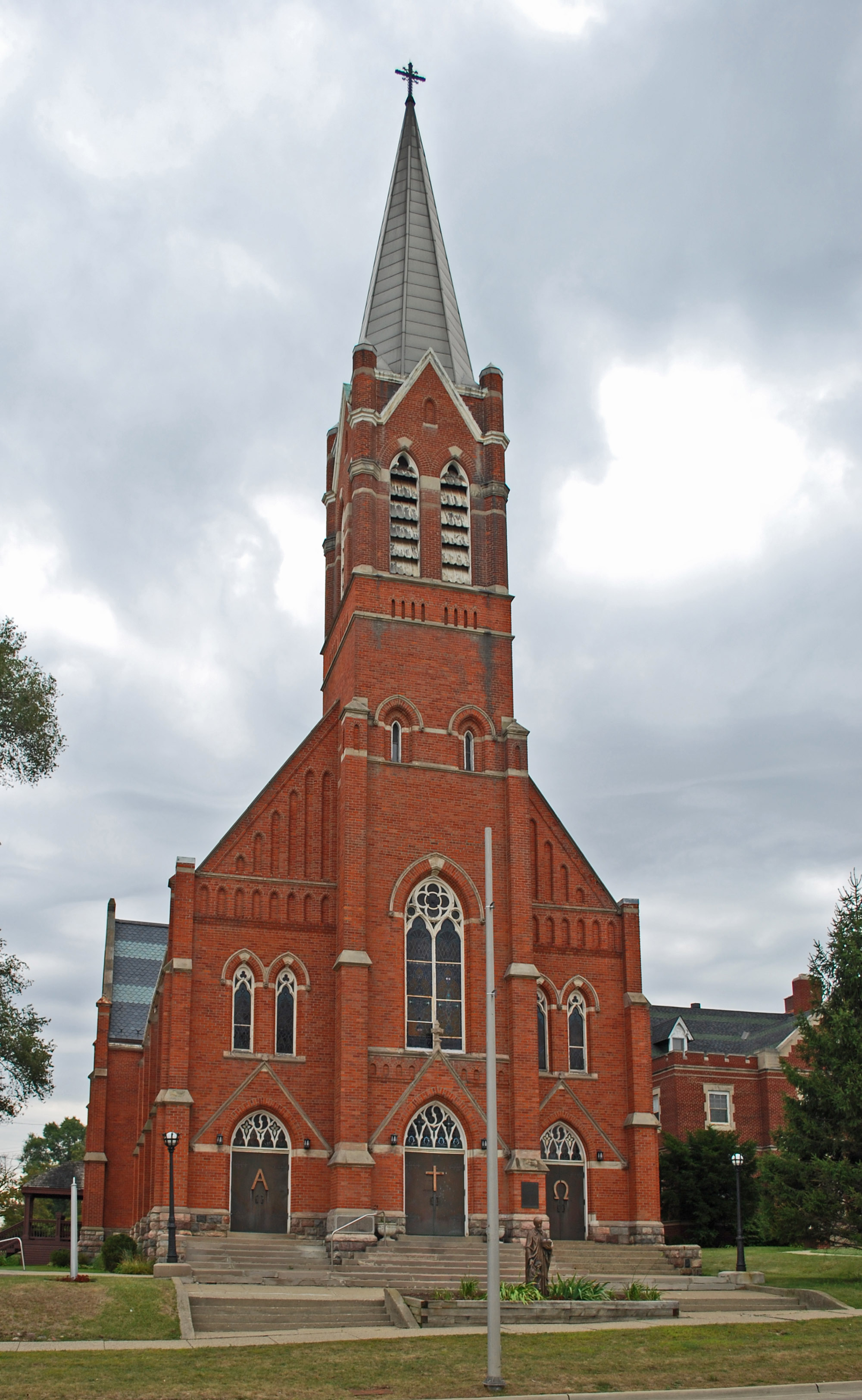
St. Vincent de Paul Church

Residents are zoned to the School District of the City of Pontiac. The district runs one main high school, Pontiac High School. There were once two high schools, Pontiac Northern and Pontiac Central, but by December 2008 administrators were making plans to consolidate the schools.

Four charter schools operate in Pontiac; they are Pontiac Academy for Excellence (K-12), Arts and Technology Academy, Walton Charter, and Great Lakes Academy. Pontiac is also home to Notre Dame Preparatory High School, a private Catholic school located in the North East area of the city.

== Transportation ==
=== Rail ===
Amtrak operates passenger service with its Wolverine from Pontiac to Chicago via Detroit and Battle Creek, Michigan. Service is three times daily, both arriving and departing.

Commuter rail service was once provided by Grand Trunk Western Railroad (GTW) and later Southeastern Michigan Transportation Authority (SEMTA) from Pontiac to downtown Detroit. This service ended on October 17, 1983, after subsidies were discontinued. Efforts continue to restore such commuter service.

Class one freight rail service is provided by Grand Trunk Western Railroad (GTW), which also operates a large classification yard in Pontiac serving the local auto industry. The Grand Trunk Western Railroad (reporting mark GTW) is an important subsidiary of the Canadian National Railway (CN). It constitutes the majority of CN's Chicago Division (which is part of CN's Southern Region). It operates in Michigan, Ohio, Indiana and Illinois, forming the CN mainline from Port Huron to Chicago, as well as serving Detroit and Toledo.

=== Air ===
Oakland County International Airport serves the city and surrounding areas with commuter air service. When previously owned by the city, it was known as the Pontiac City Airport. But it is located outside the city in neighboring Waterford Township and not on land contiguous with Pontiac's city limits. Detroit Metropolitan Airport, a larger international airport, is 35 miles south of the city in Romulus.

=== Bus ===
Suburban Mobility Authority for Regional Transportation (SMART) operates local and regional bus transit.

=== SMART Flex ===
Launched in March 2021, SMART Flex is an on-demand public transit service launched in partnership with TransitTech company Via Transportation as a way to help encourage first-and-last mile connections to existing bus routes as well as trips to universities, grocery stores, local hospitals and other destinations. SMART Flex is available to residents and workers in Dearborn, Troy, Pontiac, and the Hall Road corridor between Utica and New Baltimore to book rides using the SMART Flex app.

=== Road ===
The major thoroughfares in the city are: Woodward Avenue (M-1), Huron Street (M-59), and Telegraph Road (US 24). Portions of Woodward Avenue were once known as "Saginaw Street" and "Wide Track Drive" (the portion of "Wide Track Drive" that encircles the downtown business district is now known as the "Woodward Loop")

- I-75 provides a connection northwest to nearby Flint. Detroit is to the south.
- BL I-75 runs through Pontiac.
- US 24 ends north of Pontiac in at I-75. Southbound, US 24 serves suburban Detroit and Monroe before crossing into Ohio.
- Bus. US 24 serves local business traffic through the city.
- M-1 (Woodward Avenue) northbound loops around Pontiac's downtown district now known as the "Woodward Loop", continuing its loop back southbound as "Saginaw Street", then returning to the name of Woodward Avenue and routing directly to Downtown Detroit.
- M-24 (Lapeer Road) southbound ends in Auburn Hills at I-75. Northbound, the highway connects to Lapeer. Note: M-24 does not intersect with US 24.
- M-59 runs west to Howell and east to Utica and several other Detroit suburbs.

== Sports ==
The Pontiac Pharaohs of the Basketball Super League (BSL) currently play at Pontiac High School.

== Notable people ==
- Geri Allen, jazz pianist, born in Pontiac
- Lawrence S. Bacow, President of Harvard University, grew up in Pontiac
- Thomas Bredlow, blacksmith and iron artist
- Mark Bego, author, born in Pontiac
- Tim Birtsas, MLB pitcher, born in Pontiac
- Jim Bundren, NFL player, born in Pontiac
- Adolphus W. Burtt, South Dakota Attorney General
- Jamal Cain, NBA player for the Orlando Magic
- Albert J. Campbell, U.S. Representative from Montana
- Larry Joe Campbell, actor/comedian born in Pontiac and raised in Cadillac
- Mary A. Cornelius (1829–1918), writer, social reformer
- Sara Lynn Darrow, United States District Court judge, born in Pontiac
- DDG, rapper and YouTube personality, born and raised in Pontiac
- Pete Dexter, journalist, novelist, and screenwriter, born in Pontiac
- Thomas J. Drake, justice of Utah Territorial Supreme Court and third Lieutenant Governor of Michigan, died in Pontiac
- Electric Djinn, the solo musical project of NYC-based electronic musician and producer Neptune Sweet
- Dez Fitzpatrick, NFL player for the Tennessee Titans
- Tommy Edman, current center fielder for the Los Angeles Dodgers, born in Pontiac
- Kirk Gibson, MLB player and manager, two-time World Series champion, born in Pontiac
- Jonas Gray, NFL player, born in Pontiac
- K. J. Hamler, NFL player for the Indianapolis Colts
- Jayden Harrison, former college football player
- Laura Innes, actress, starred in hit television series ER; born in Pontiac
- Isaiah Jackson, NBA player for the Indiana Pacers
- Elvin Jones, jazz drummer of the post-bop era, born in Pontiac
- Hank Jones, musician, 2009 recipient of Grammy Lifetime Achievement Award; lived in Pontiac
- Hayes Jones, hurdler, NCAA champion and 1964 Summer Olympics gold medalist; lived in Pontiac
- Thad Jones, jazz musician, born in Pontiac
- Kem, R&B/Soul singer–songwriter and producer
- Jack Kevorkian, pathologist, euthanasia activist, painter, author, composer and instrumentalist, born in Pontiac
- Micki King, diver, Olympic gold medalist and 10-time national champion, U.S. Air Force colonel, born in Pontiac
- Rebecca Kleefisch, Lieutenant Governor of Wisconsin 2011–2019, born in Pontiac
- Henry W. Lord, U.S. Congressman from Michigan
- Tony Lucca, actor/singer and former Mouseketeer, born in Pontiac
- Madonna, singer, songwriter, record producer, and actress, lived in Pontiac during childhood
- Michael Mallory, author/actor, grew up in Pontiac
- Dave Marsh, music critic
- Yante Maten, NBA player for the Miami Heat
- Clara McDaniel (born 1948 in Pontiac), blues singer and songwriter
- Derek Minor, rapper, born in Pontiac
- Daniel O'Shea, figure skater, 2016 national champion, born in Pontiac
- Duane D. Pearsall, physicist and inventor
- Gary Peters, U.S. senator for Michigan, born in Pontiac
- Howard "Howdy" Quicksell, musician, lived and died in Pontiac
- Walker Russell, pro basketball player, born in Pontiac
- Walker Russell Jr., pro basketball player, born in Pontiac
- Frank Russell, NBA player, Chicago Bulls, first from Oakland County and Pontiac to play in modern NBA; raised in Pontiac
- Campy Russell, basketball player, Michigan and NBA; Best High School Player in America 1971–72, NBA All-Star 1978–79; broadcaster for Cleveland Cavaliers; raised in Pontiac
- Bryan Rust, NHL hockey player for the Pittsburgh Penguins, 2x Stanley Cup Champion
- Alfred Taubman, real estate developer, owned famed Sotheby's auction house and Michigan Panthers pro football team; born in Pontiac
- Joe Urla, actor
- Wilma Vaught, U.S. Air Force brigadier general, born in Pontiac
- Martell Webb, NFL player
- Tim Welke, MLB umpire, born in Pontiac
- Donald F. White (1908–2002), Canadian-born American architect and engineer, of African descent; first Black licensed architect in the state of Michigan; he attended Pontiac High School

== Climate ==
The Köppen Climate Classification subtype for this climate is "Dfb" (Warm Summer Continental Climate).

Climate data for Pontiac WWTP, Michigan (1991–2020 normals, extremes 1894–present)
Month	Jan	Feb	Mar	Apr	May	Jun	Jul	Aug	Sep	Oct	Nov	Dec	Year
Record high °F (°C)	66 (19)	65 (18)	84 (29)	89 (32)	95 (35)	102 (39)	104 (40)	102 (39)	98 (37)	90 (32)	79 (26)	65 (18)	104 (40)
Mean daily maximum °F (°C)	31.3 (−0.4)	34.0 (1.1)	44.3 (6.8)	57.6 (14.2)	69.4 (20.8)	78.2 (25.7)	82.3 (27.9)	80.8 (27.1)	73.9 (23.3)	60.5 (15.8)	47.4 (8.6)	36.4 (2.4)	58.0 (14.4)
Daily mean °F (°C)	24.2 (−4.3)	26.1 (−3.3)	35.2 (1.8)	47.0 (8.3)	59.2 (15.1)	68.4 (20.2)	72.6 (22.6)	71.3 (21.8)	63.8 (17.7)	51.4 (10.8)	39.7 (4.3)	30.3 (−0.9)	49.1 (9.5)
Mean daily minimum °F (°C)	17.1 (−8.3)	18.2 (−7.7)	26.2 (−3.2)	36.4 (2.4)	49.0 (9.4)	58.6 (14.8)	62.9 (17.2)	61.7 (16.5)	53.7 (12.1)	42.3 (5.7)	32.1 (0.1)	24.3 (−4.3)	40.2 (4.6)
Record low °F (°C)	−21 (−29)	−22 (−30)	−8 (−22)	6 (−14)	23 (−5)	34 (1)	41 (5)	37 (3)	29 (−2)	15 (−9)	2 (−17)	−12 (−24)	−22 (−30)
Average precipitation inches (mm)	2.18 (55)	1.87 (47)	2.19 (56)	2.94 (75)	3.81 (97)	3.29 (84)	3.14 (80)	3.24 (82)	2.92 (74)	2.90 (74)	3.15 (80)	2.25 (57)	33.88 (861)
Average snowfall inches (cm)	12.1 (31)	9.0 (23)	4.1 (10)	0.9 (2.3)	0.0 (0.0)	0.0 (0.0)	0.0 (0.0)	0.0 (0.0)	0.0 (0.0)	0.1 (0.25)	1.7 (4.3)	8.1 (21)	36.0 (91)
Average precipitation days (≥ 0.01 in)	12.5	10.0	9.5	11.3	12.6	10.5	9.7	9.8	9.2	12.0	10.3	12.4	129.8
Average snowy days (≥ 0.1 in)	8.8	7.2	3.7	0.9	0.0	0.0	0.0	0.0	0.0	0.1	1.6	6.7	29.0
Source: NOAA

== See also ==
- Images of metropolitan Detroit
- Gary Burnstein Community Health Clinic
- Saginaw Trail
- Woodward Corridor
- Pontiac fever
