= Banknotes of the Lithuanian litas =

Prior to the introduction of the euro in 2015, banknotes of Lithuania were denominated in litas. All banknotes were of the same size (135 mm × 65 mm) except for the 500 litų banknote. They bore the signatures of Minister of Finance and/or of Chairperson of the Bank of Lithuania Board. 10, 20, and 50 litų banknotes had 4 releases. This was mainly due to security reasons: number of security features was gradually increased from virtually 0, to 9, 14 and eventually to 17. The first release bore the date "1991" but were actually released to the public in 1993 for a very brief time (June–October). Since they were replaced in the same year, the first release is dated to 1991 and the second to 1993.

The banknotes were not printed in Lithuania: at first they were printed by the United States Banknote Corporation, later by the UK-based Thomas De La Rue & Co. Ltd. and the Germany-based Giesecke & Devrient GmbH.

== 10 litų ==
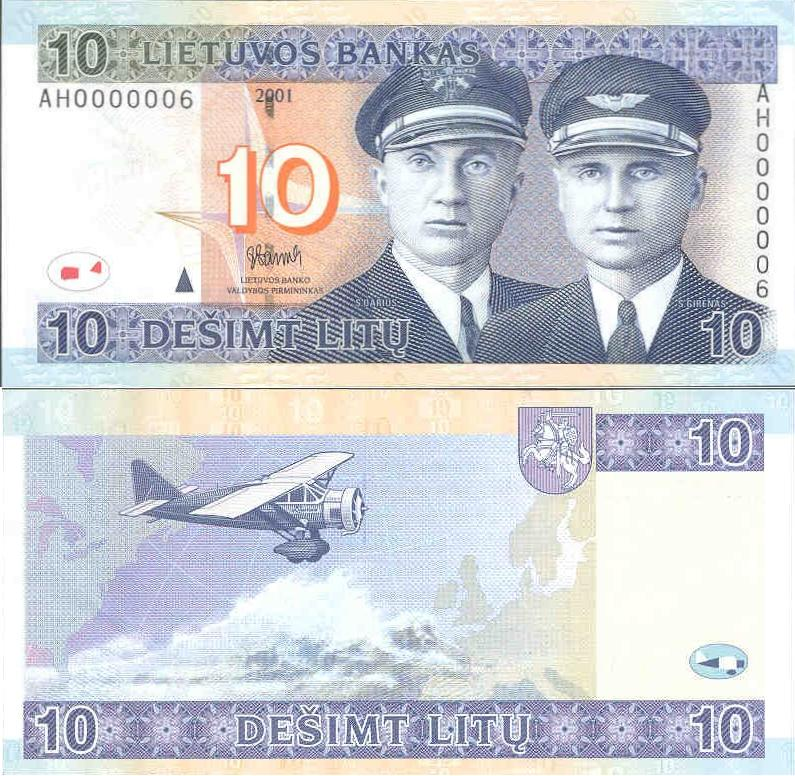
10 litų banknote (2001 release). Compare with 1991, 1993 and 1997 releases.

The reverse of the 10 litų banknote featured Lithuanian heroes, Steponas Darius and Stasys Girėnas. In 1933 they flew from New York City over the Atlantic Ocean with a small plane called Lituanica. However, the plane mysteriously crashed in Germany (now Poland). The duo did not survive. The obverse depicts Lituanica flying over the Atlantic Ocean with visible shores of the North America and Europe.

This banknote was noticed by the international press covering the introduction of the litas. Journalists made a metaphor that the litas should do better than the pilots, i.e. the litas, hopefully, would not crash.

The most recent release clearly showed Darius wearing the cap with an insignia from then-Palwaukee Municipal Airport (now Chicago Executive Airport) located in Wheeling, Illinois. It attracted some attention from collectors.

The banknote was designed and redesigned by Giedrius Jonaitis. The very first draft of new Lithuanian currency had Darius and Girėnas on the 5 litai banknote. It was released in different designs four times (in 1993 (twice), 1997, and 2001). The first banknote design started an international scandal. In 1992, these banknotes were printed and ready to be released to the public. However, it was discovered that they were virtually unprotected against counterfeiting. It delayed the introduction of the litas as the banknotes had to be reprinted. The banknotes bearing the date "1991" were released for a very short time and were quickly replaced by the 1993 issue. The major design ideas have not changed throughout the issues.

In 1993, on the 60th anniversary of Lituanica's flight, the 10 litų silver commemorative coin was issued featuring the pilots. It was the second commemorative coin issued by "Lithuanian Mint" (the first was for Pope John Paul II's visit to Lithuania).

== 20 litų ==
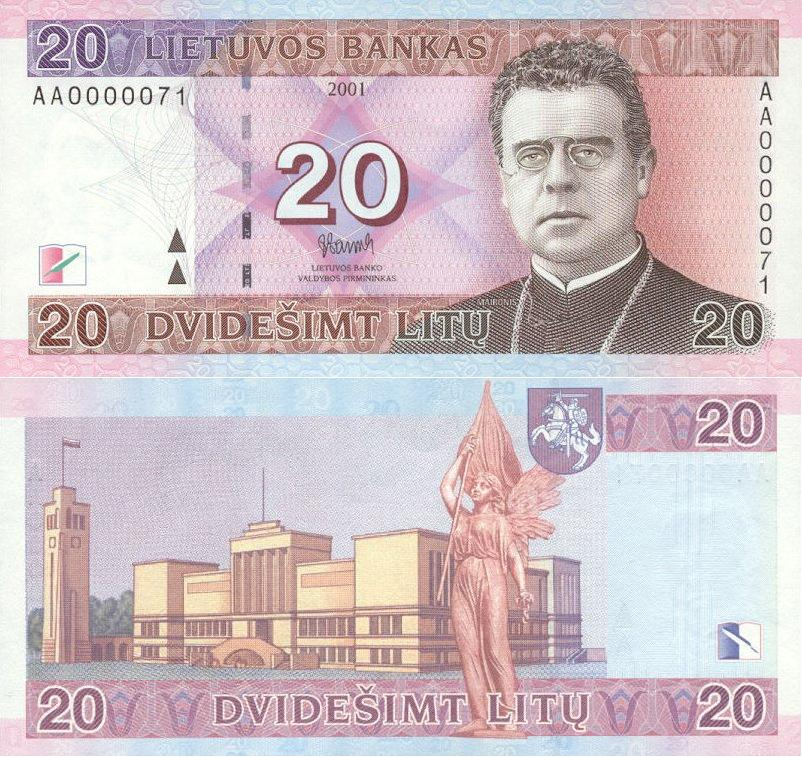
20 litų banknote (2001 release). Compare with 1991, 1993, and 1997 releases.

The banknote featured a portrait of the Lithuanian romantic poet Maironis (real name Jonas Mačiulis, 1862–1932) who was a great patriot and made efforts to "wake up" the nation, to inspire resistance to Russification policies, and fight for the independence of Lithuania from Imperial Russia.

The obverse features the Vytautas the Great War Museum in Kaunas, with its carillon tower (the most famous exhibit in the museum is a wreckage of "Lituanica" airplane). The reverse also depicts the Statue of Liberty by Juozas Zikaras, commemorating the declaration of Lithuania's independence in 1918. The 20 litų banknote released in 1930 also featured the same Statue of Liberty on the back, just it is on the left hand side. The obverse of the 1930 banknote featured Vytautas the Great himself.

The banknotes printed in 1991, together with the 10 litų banknotes, started an international scandal. The 1991 release was replaced very quickly. The 1993 release was designed by Justas Tolvaišis. The last issue was designed by Giedrius Jonaitis. The major change in 2001 issue was moving the Statue of Liberty from the left hand side to the right on the back.

== 50 litų ==
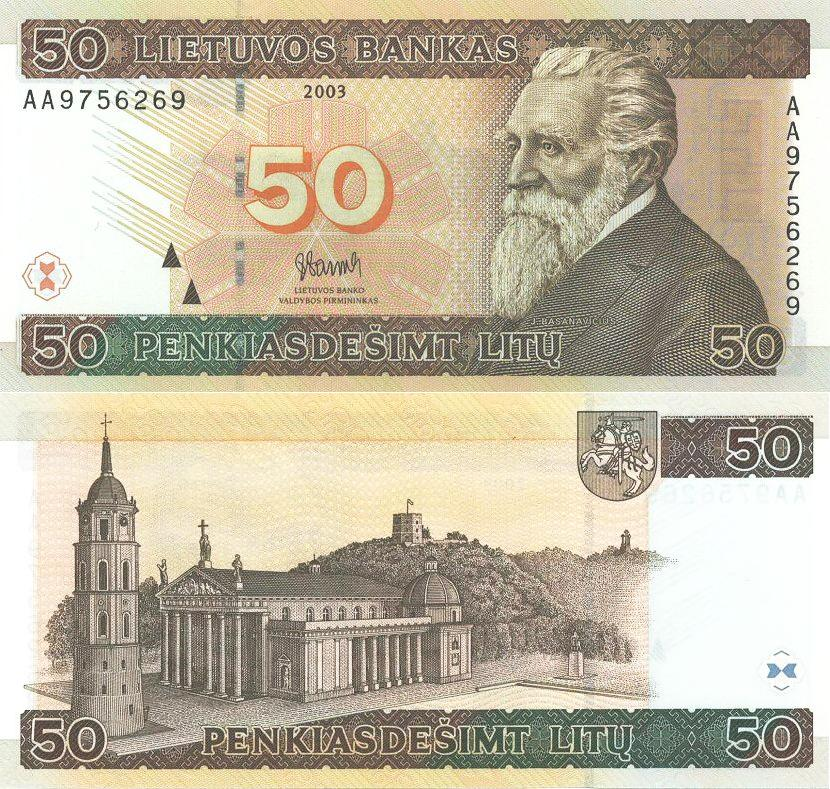
50 litų banknote (2003 release). Compare with 1991, 1993, and 1998 releases.

The obverse bore a portrait of the national patriarch, scholar, statesman and signatory of Lithuania's Declaration of Independence of February 16, 1918, Dr. Jonas Basanavičius (1851–1927). Sometimes he is nicknamed as "father of independence" as he was the chairman of Council of Lithuania when the declaration was signed.

The back of the banknote depicted Vilnius Cathedral and its belfry, Monument to Grand Duke Gediminas, Gediminas Castle and the Hill of Three Crosses. All these objects are considered as the heart of Vilnius and are strong national symbols.

The 50 litų banknote released in 1928 also features Basanavičius and Vilnius Cathedral. It makes this banknote the only one that closely represents a banknote released in the interwar Lithuania.

The 1991 release faced the same destiny as 10 and 20 litų banknotes. They were released for a very short time. The 1993 release was designed by Ray Bartkus. At first the reverse depicted only Vilnius Cathedral and indistinctive houses of Vilnius Old Town. In 1998 release, however, the view of the cathedral shifted to include the other monuments. The 2003 issue was the last banknote added to the banknote family. Despite that, the view featured on the banknote appeared outdated as it failed to display the Royal Palace, which was under construction when banknote was released.

== 100 litų ==
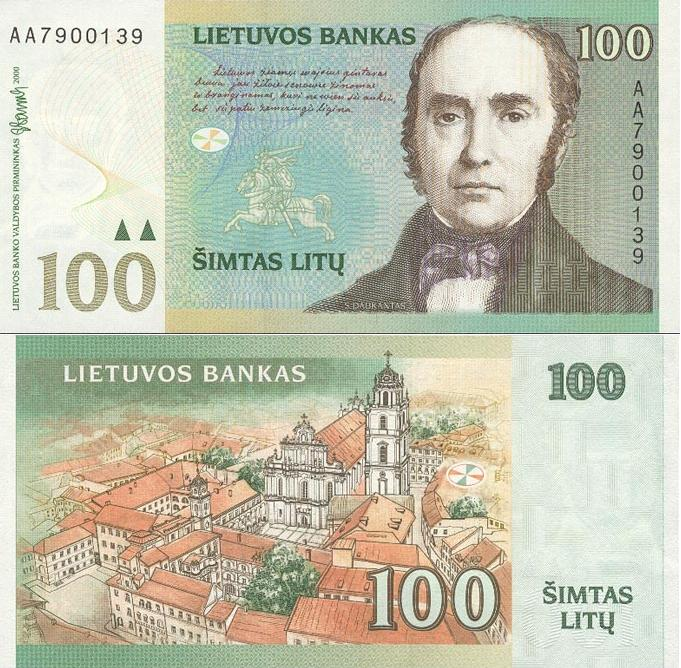
100 litų banknote (2000 release). Compare with 1991 release.

It featured Simonas Daukantas (1793–1864), the initiator of the national rebirth movement (when Lithuanians started to realize that they are one nation), historian, who wrote the first history of Lithuania in the Lithuanian language. The reverse shows the Vilnius Old Town, which is included in the UNESCO list of World Heritage Sites. The focus is the architectural ensemble of Vilnius University with St. John's Church and its belfry. This makes Vilnius featured twice.

The first 1991 release of the 100 litų banknotes did not meet the same destiny as 10, 20, or 50 litų banknotes. It was decided that it had sufficient security measures to be released and used. However, it did not spread widely and today together with other 1991 banknotes is withdrawn from the market. It could be exchanged for a new 100 litų banknote only at Bank of Lithuania central office. The new banknote with 19 security features was introduced only in 2000. The appearance changed quite a bit. The back of the new banknote zoomed in more on the Vilnius University campus and left less space for other houses in Vilnius Old Town. Also, the colors were brighter and sharper. In format it resembled more 200 and 500 litų banknotes than 10, 20, or 50.

== 200 litų ==
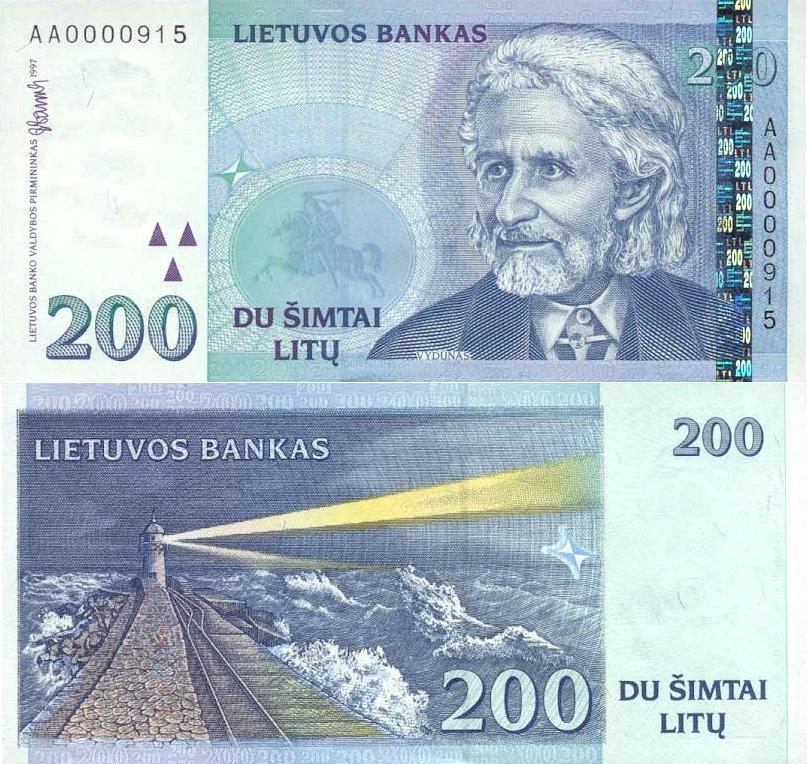
200 litų banknote (1997 release)

The banknote featured a portrait of Vydūnas (real name Vilhelmas Storosta, 1868–1953), a prominent Lithuanian philosopher, writer, poet, playwright, musician, pedagogue and culture educator. He was spreading idealistic philosophy and ideas of humanism through his works.

The back depicted the Klaipėda (Memel) lighthouse erected in 1796 and reconstructed in 1819. The lighthouse was 29.2 m high and its beams stretched up to 35 kilometers. The lighthouse was a symbol of the city and was popular among tourists. However, it has not survived and is not well known today. However, it was very likely that Klaipėda was chosen because Vilnius was featured twice, Kaunas once, and Klaipėda is the 3rd largest city in Lithuania.

The designer was Rytis Valantinas and it was the only release.

== 500 litų ==
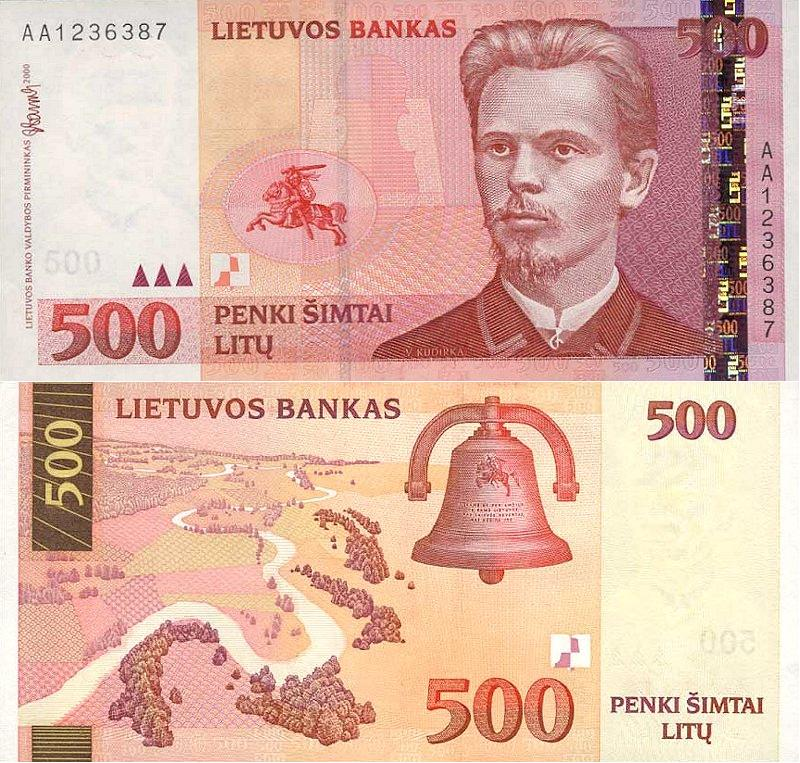
500 litų banknote (2000 release)

The banknote depicted a portrait of Vincas Kudirka (1858–1899), a Lithuanian writer, participant of the national rebirth movement and author of Tautiška giesmė, the national anthem.

The back of the note showed Bell of the Freedom in the background of Nemunas loops, a well-known scenery. The bell has been inscribed in Lithuanian: "O skambink per amžius vaikams Lietuvos, kad laisvės nevertas, kas negina jos" (in English: "Thou shalt ring through the centuries to the children of Lithuania: he who does not defend freedom is not worthy of it"). This four-line poem was created by Bronius Kazys Balutis (1879–1967) and became the motto of Bell of Freedom, a newspaper published by one of the partisan groups. Also, Kudirka was one of the publishers of Varpas ("bell") newspaper to educate and inspire Lithuanians to for a nation and fight for independence during the Lithuanian national revival.

This banknote was slightly bigger than the rest (147 mm x 70 mm) and has 22 security features (other banknotes have 16-19). At first it was doubted if Lithuania needed a 500 litų banknote as it was more than a minimum monthly salary. The designer of the banknote was Giedrius Jonaitis and it was the only release.

== Former Designs ==
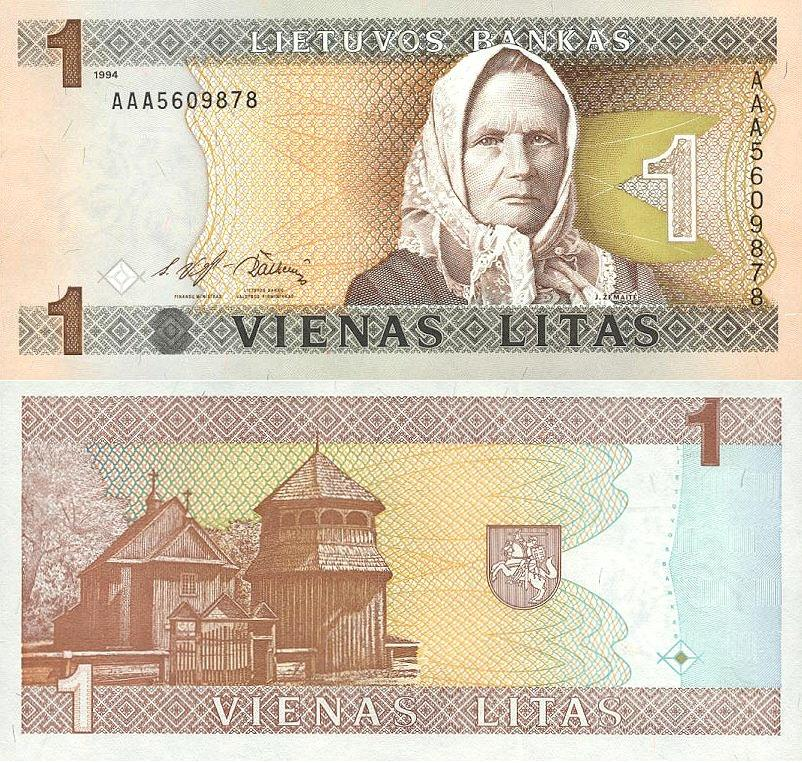
1 litas - 1994 release

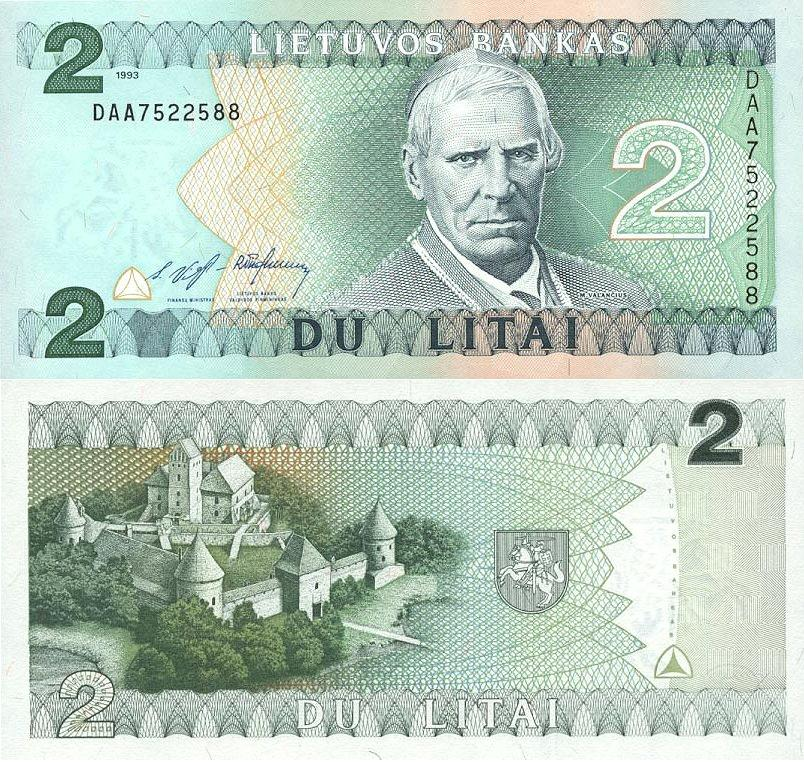
2 litai - 1993 release

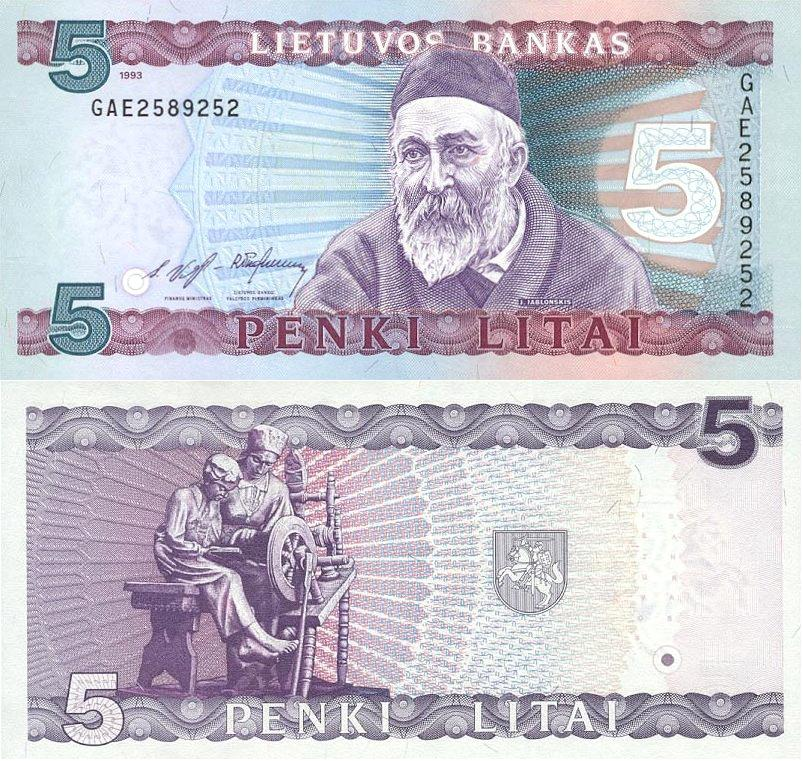
5 litai - 1993 release

500 and 1000 litų were designed for the first 1993 series, but never issued. The designs are very similar to the 100-litas note of the same series.
