= Electric Djinn =

- Origin: New York City
- Genres: Electronic; IDM; experimental; dark electronic
- Instruments: Vocals; laptop
- Years active: 2013–present
- Website: electricdjinn.com

Electric Djinn (born in Pontiac, Michigan) is the solo musical project of American electronic musician and producer Neptune Sweet, based in New York City. Her EP is entitled The Singles (2014). She has also released two singles: "Deer Xing" (2015), the video for which was reviewed by Tiny Mix Tapes, and "Phoenix" (2019).

== Background ==
The daughter of a first-generation Croatian-American and mixed-heritage American, Sweet spent her formative years in Grand Rapids, Michigan. After leaving art school, she moved to New York City.

== Career ==
Neptune Sweet started Electric Djinn with a group of four others in the 2010s: visual artists Mike Estabrook, Vandana Jain, Emmanual Migriño, and jazz drummer David Gould in New York City. They met and practiced in South Slope, Brooklyn and recorded an eight-track album, Rejector, at Emandee Studios, Williamsburg.

Interested in exploring the possibility of virtual synthesizers, Sweet decided to go her own way. After disbanding the group, she self-recorded The Singles as Electric Djinn in 2014 then "Deer Xing" the following year. Researching alternative music venues to play at as a solo artist, she applied for and got into the Make Music Festival in the East Village in 2013 then subsequently curated its program the next several years.

Also in 2013, she played at 1335 Mabini gallery in Manila and the Colony Cafe in Woodstock, New York. Two years later she played at Post Pablo Gallery in the Philippines' capital, at the Dacha Project in Freeville, New York, and Black Bear Bar in Williamsburg, the former Galapagos art space. 2016 saw performances in Harlem, at Bliss on Bliss Studio in Queens, and at Aliya Surf Camp Resort in Baler, Philippines, the latter a result of an artist's residency at AIR Aurora in Baler. The next year she played at New York's the Delanceyand with visual artist Maria Hupfield at Gibney Dance.

Her collaboration with Hupfield continued into 2018 with her providing the sound to the latter's performance piece during the January opening of Hupfield's solo exhibition at Galerie de l'UQAM in Quebec and in the piece The Kind of Dream You've Never Seen at the Brooklyn Museum in July. She also played an event at Ambrosia Elixirs store in Bushwick and continues to play at the Delancey.

Electric Djinn premiered the music video for "Deer Xing" in 2017, and it was reviewed by Tiny Mix Tapes In addition to being listed in Female:Pressure, her "Phoenix" was reviewed favorably by Glamglare, with Elke Nominikat writing that the track is "gorgeous." She further writes that Electric Djinn "creates highly appealing indie electronic songs that are grounded in low frequencies, programmed beats and topped off with virtual synths and processed vocals.... The results are actually quite mesmerizing and emotional."

== Discography ==
- Rejector (EP, 2010s)
- "Deer Xing" (single, 2015)
- "Phoenix" (single, 2019)

== Professional affiliations ==
- Broadcast Music, Inc. (BMI)
- Women in Music (WIM)
