= Erebus haunted attraction =

Haunted attraction in Pontiac, Michigan

Erebus
- Erebus Logo
- Interactive map of Erebus
- Location: 18 S. Perry St., Pontiac, Michigan
- Coordinates: 42.6362628°N 83.2929243°W
- Opened: 2000
- Operated by: Edward & Jim Terebus
- Theme: Halloween
- Operating season: Fall
- Website: Official website

Erebus is a four-story haunted attraction located in Pontiac, Michigan, open seasonally for Halloween. It held the Guinness World Record for largest walk-through haunted attraction from 2005 until 2009, when it lost the record to Cutting Edge Haunted House. It is not recommended for children under 13.

== History ==
Erebus Haunted Attraction opened in 2000 in what was formerly an abandoned four-story parking garage in Pontiac, Michigan. The parking structure was abandoned for nearly 50 years and had been used as an indoor junkyard prior to Erebus moving in. The owners, Edward and Jim Terebus, had operated other haunted attractions around the Detroit area prior to Erebus, mainly portable haunts built out in trailers. In addition to Erebus, their first permanent attraction, they also publish Fear Finder, a seasonal publication, to serve as a central hub for all haunted houses in Michigan to advertise and allow the people interested to locate them easily.

== Attraction ==
Erebus changes the basic effects and events from year to year, but the main theme stays the same. Patrons are sent through time by a scientist where they experience many different eras in history. The actors along the walkthrough push the boundaries of privacy and how to "touch" the visitors without actually laying a hand on anyone by utilizing props, animatronics, and massive puppets. In one of the events, a 6-foot (1.8 m) dragon comes out from the gloom and eats the patron. Some of the other effects utilize mirrors, and include a moving wall pushing patrons toward a bottomless pit, as well as burying them alive.

== Features ==
The Metro Detroit area is home to many haunted and Halloween attractions, including Erebus. Erebus occupies 100,000 square feet (9,300 m^{2}) and uses 70,000 square feet (6,500 m^{2}) of that for storing props. The haunted attraction occupies multiple stories including an elevator. The production hires about 90 actors as well as uses animatronics resembling animals and monsters. Erebus uses these animatronics to bypass the “no-touch” safety rules, as well as other techniques such as dropping fake bugs from the ceiling and making building structures move. Erebus also uses landscape changes throughout the walk-through including inclines, stairwells, narrow passages, low ceilings, and trap doors. Additionally, Erebus mounts electronic props such as lasers, lights, and mirrors to create visual obstruction and manipulation. Unique in haunted attractions, Erebus has an illuminated scoreboard tracking "wimps" and "wetters".

== Awards ==
- 2005–09: This four-story attraction was entered into the Guinness Book of World Records as the "World's Largest Walk-Through Haunted Attraction" (2,189 linear feet).
- 2009: Click on Detroit voted Erebus the "#1 Best Haunted House in Pontiac".
- 2010: Rated Number 1 as United States' best haunted house
- 2015: #8 scariest, biggest and best haunted houses
