= Ann Burnstein =

American bridge player

Ann Burnstein is an American bridge player.

== Bridge accomplishments ==
=== Wins ===
- North American Bridge Championships (11)
  - Chicago Mixed Board-a-Match (2) 1952, 1953
  - Rockwell Mixed Pairs (2) 1946, 1952
  - Smith Life Master Women's Pairs (1) 1963
  - Wagar Women's Knockout Teams (3) 1951, 1962, 1979
  - Whitehead Women's Pairs (1) 1979

=== Runners-up ===
- North American Bridge Championships (3)
  - Smith Life Master Women's Pairs (1) 1962
  - Wagar Women's Knockout Teams (1) 1955
  - Whitehead Women's Pairs (1) 1946
