= Gary Burnstein Community Health Clinic =

Free clinic in Michigan, United States

Coordinates: 42.640434°N 83.289408°W

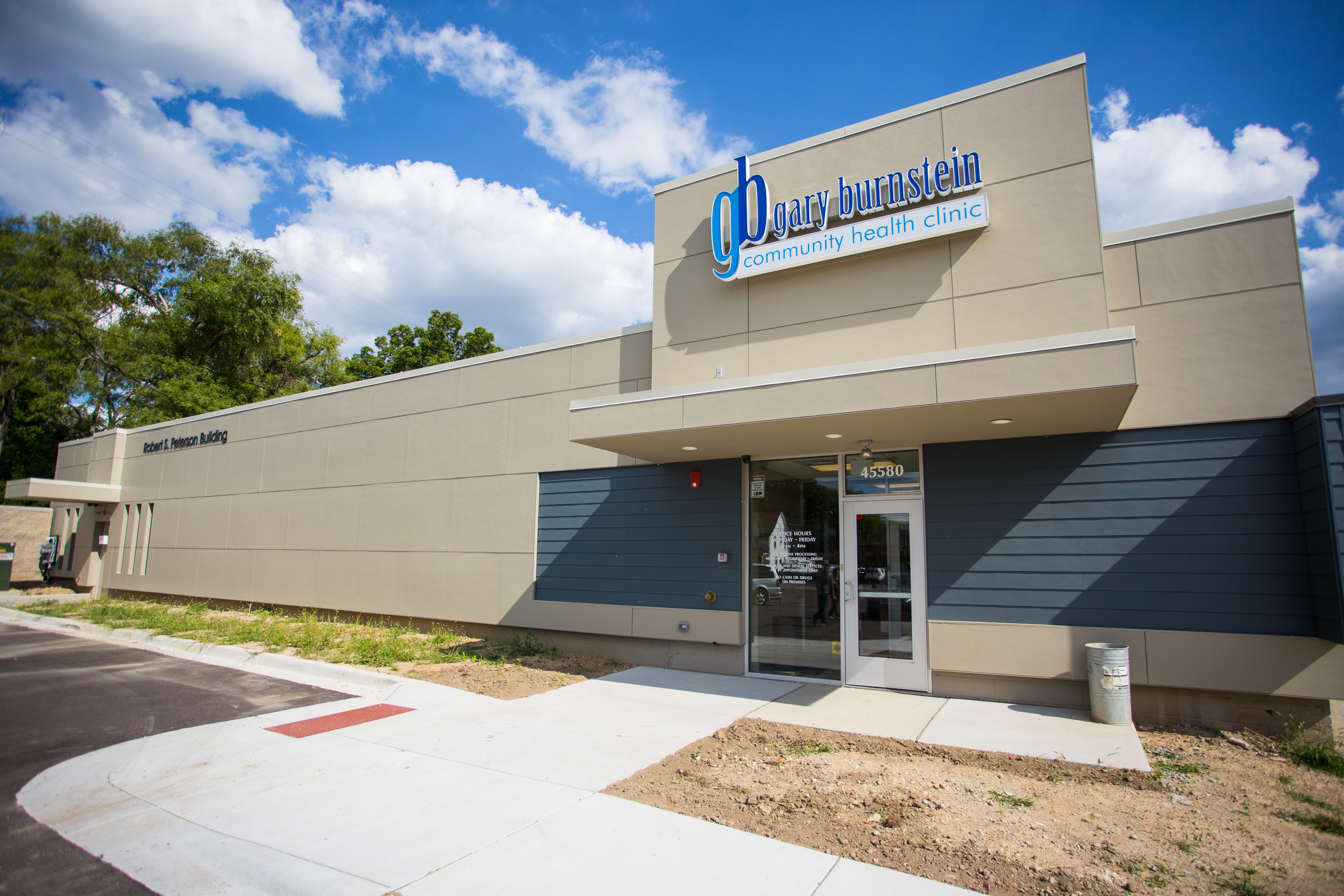
- Named after: Gary Burnstein
- Type: Nonprofit
- Location: Pontiac, Michigan
- President: Ian Burnstein and Linda Kovan
- Treasurer: Gabe Karp
- Secretary: Lori Burnstein Taylor
- CEO: Mary Lewis
- Main organ: Board of Directors
- Staff: 12
- Volunteers: 700
- Website: http://www.garyburnsteinclinic.org/

The Gary Burnstein Community Health Clinic is a Michigan's largest volunteer-led free clinic in Pontiac, Michigan, United States. It provides free medical, dental, pharmacy, a vision program, specialty care (gynecology, cardiology, urology, optometry, podiatry, etc.), and labs to Michigan residents who are uninsured or underinsured. The clinic serves all 83 Michigan counties. The Burnstein free clinic faces strong demand due to high unemployment in Michigan.

== History ==
In 1997, Dr. Gary Burnstein, a cardiologist, started caring for patients from a local shelter in Pontiac, Michigan. Dr. Burnstein died in September 2003. His family took up his goal of providing healthcare access to the uninsured and founded the Dr. Gary Burnstein Community Health Clinic in October 2004.

=== 90 West University building ===
Volunteers from the Kensington Community Church renovated a building into an operating medical clinic, dental clinic, and pharmacy from January 2004 through October 2004. The clinic opened in October 2004. In 2005, a fire at the clinic forced the clinic to move temporarily to the Grace Centers of Hope church.

The clinic reopened in December 2005. The volunteer medical team saw about 150 to 200 patients and filled 300 to 400 prescriptions per month. The clinic had four examination rooms, a procedure room, two dental examination rooms with X-ray capabilities, and a pharmacy laboratory.

=== 45580 Woodward Avenue building ===
In 2013 the Robert S. Peterson Foundation purchased a new building for the clinic. After a little over a year of fundraising and design, construction began on the new facility in October 2014, and the clinic moved into its new space in February 2015. The new building has seven medical exam rooms, five dental operating rooms, a full-service pharmacy, and an educational room. The Clinic offers various specialty services, including podiatry, dermatology, cardiology, optometry, gynecology, etc. All services are free to uninsured, low-income adults. COVID vaccines are available for ages five and older.

== Services ==
All of the following services are provided free to qualifying patients:

- Basic primary care
- Patient education
- Disease prevention and screening
- Women's health, including gynecological care
- Men's health
- Laboratory testing
- Gynecological care
- Full pharmacy services
- Basic Behavioral Health services

=== Patient requirements ===
- Supply the clinic with valid picture identification
- Be a resident of the State of Michigan, 18 years or older.
- Be uninsured or underinsured

== Fundraising ==
The financial support of the Clinic is based almost entirely on community donations, corporate and charitable grants, public grants, private donations.

=== Events ===
- Esteemed Women of Michigan
