= Burnstein-Malin Grocery =

- Formerly listed on the U.S. National Register of Historic Places
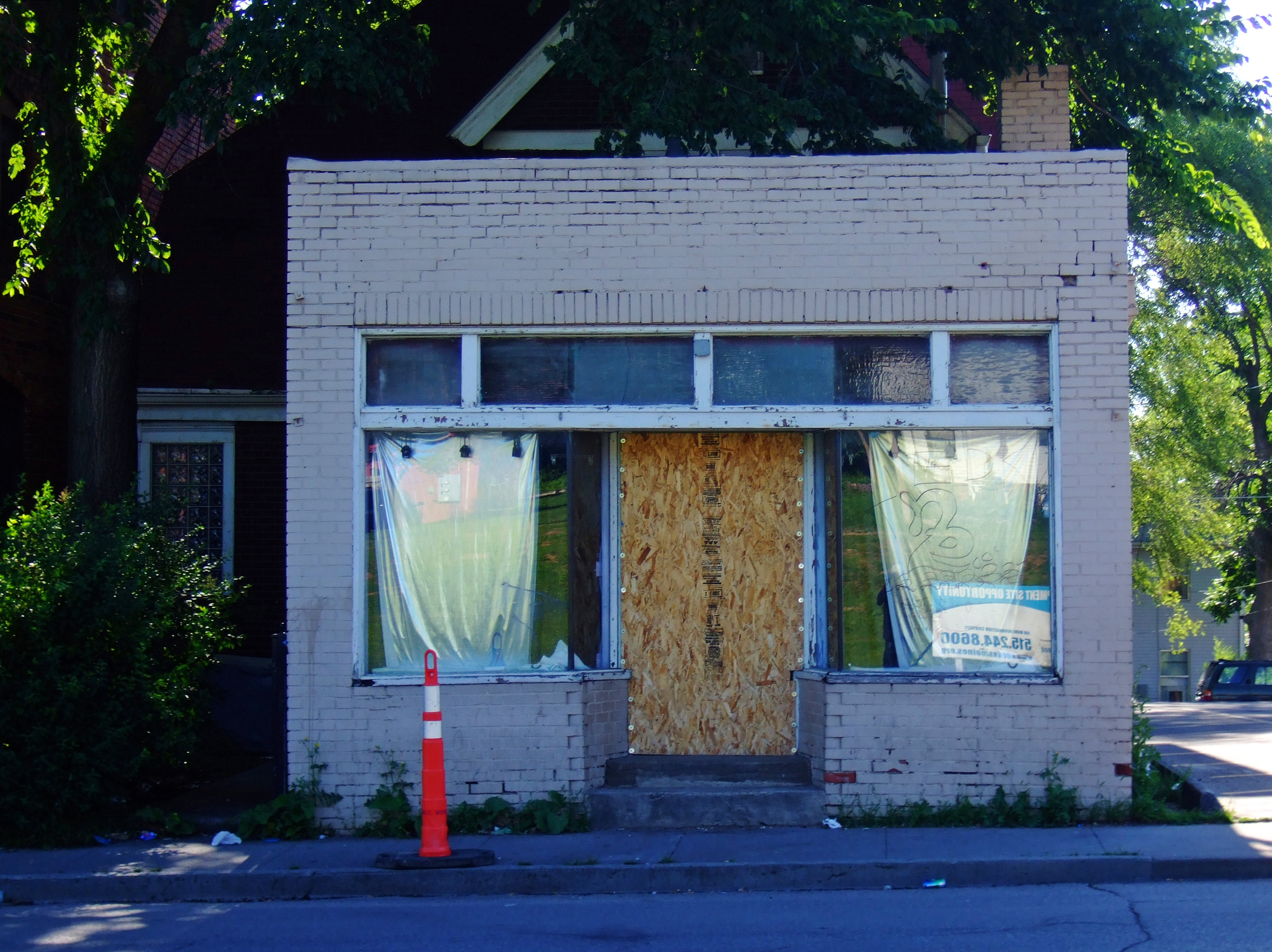

- Location within Iowa Location within the United States
- Location: 1241 6th Ave. Des Moines, Iowa
- Coordinates: 41°36′07.1″N 93°37′31.8″W
- Area: less than one acre
- Built: 1940
- MPS: Towards a Greater Des Moines MPS
- NRHP reference No.: 98001277

Significant dates
- Added to NRHP: October 22, 1998
- Removed from NRHP: March 7, 2019

The Burnstein-Malin Grocery, also known as the Malin's Kosher Delicatessen, Pickle Barrel Delicatessen, and The Pickle Barrel, was a historic building located in Des Moines, Iowa, United States. This commercial building was constructed in two parts. The first part was a 2½-story frame house built back from Sixth Avenue for Frank W. Whitcomb in 1896. It was converted into Burnstein Grocery in 1923. The number of commercial establishments along this street increased five-fold between 1920 and 1937, and the Whitcomb house exemplified this transition. The single-story brick section on the front was completed in 1940. The two sections shared a common wall. This was one of several modified residence-specialty stores that were located along Sixth Avenue from the 1930s through the 1950s, but by the end of the century it was only one of two that remained standing. The building was listed on the National Register of Historic Places in 1998. It has subsequently been torn down and it was delisted from the National Register in 2019.
