= Mike Estabrook (artist) =

American artist

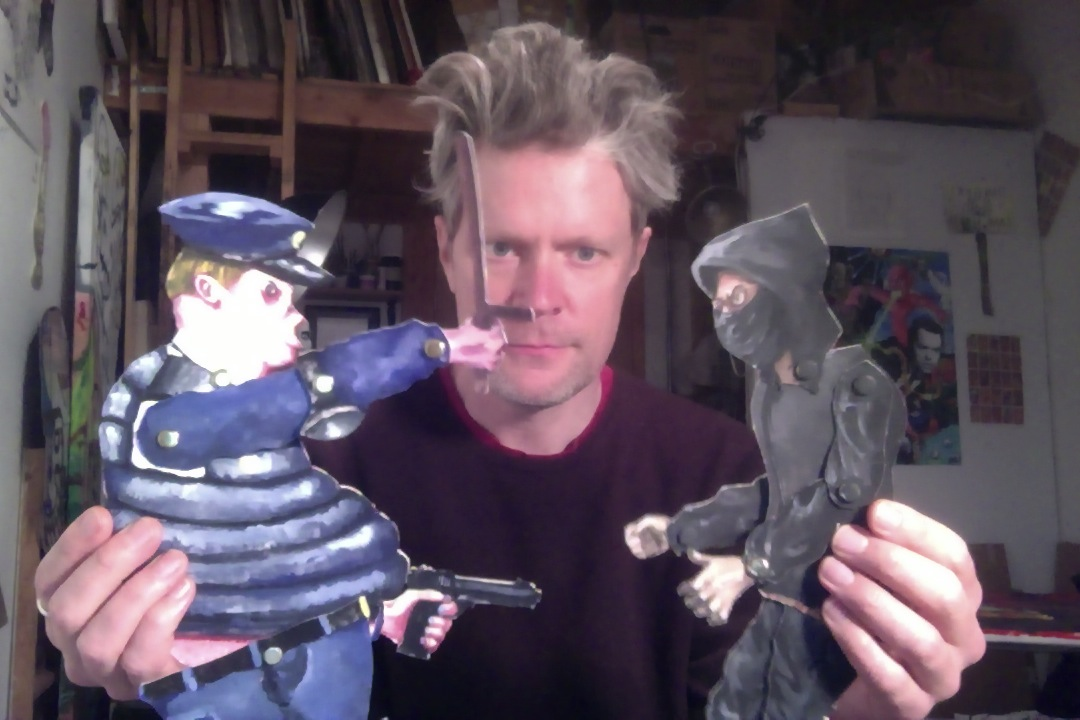
- Estabrook in 2015
- Born: June 4, 1970 (age 55); Quincy, Illinois, USA
- Education: BFA -- University of Illinois at Urbana–Champaign, Urbana and Champaign, Illinois, USA; MFA -- Queens College, Queens, NY, USA
- Known for: Painting, drawing, photography, sculpture, writing, film
- Notable work: The Road to Nam (2004); Jackson (2014); Popes (2009); Yllier'O Llib (2006); The Warriors of the Dragon's Teeth (2015); B_potemk (2014)
- Movement: political art pop surrealism animation

Mike Estabrook (born in Quincy, Illinois) is an American visual artist based in Brooklyn, New York. His work spans several media, including animation, painting, drawing, performance and installation. He makes work that is funny, grotesque, fantastical, and political. He often imposes these fantastical creations onto pre-existing cultural materials such as movie clips, army recruiting pamphlets, and magazines.

He has been active as both an exhibitor and an organizer at ABC No Rio since 1995. His work has also been shown at several prominent venues, including P.P.O.W. Gallery, the Queens Museum of Art, P.S.1, Arario Gallery, Nurture Art, and the Bronx Museum of the Arts. He has been in residence at The MacDowell Colony, both the workspace and the Governors Island residency at Lower Manhattan Cultural Council, and NY Arts Beijing.

image on left A still from Self-Inflicted Monster Death, 2010.

== Animations ==
In 2003, he began making animations that took from a variety of cultural sources, juxtaposing different elements to make a political or aesthetic statement. An early example is The Road to Nam, a mash-up in which the famous Eddie Adams photograph of an execution during the Vietnam War is animated to depict the two main characters each singing a part to Bob Hope and Bing Crosby's version of If I Knew You Were Comin' I'd a Baked a Cake. More typical of later animations is The Good, Etc., in which Estabrook takes footage from the climactic showdown scene of The Good, The Bad, and The Ugly, and essentially doodles his own monsters on top of it. He has also done this with the Zapruder footage of the Kennedy Assassination, and scenes from Demille's The Ten Commandments.

Popes, installed at St. Paul the Apostle Church, NYC, fall 2009.

== Installations ==
His installation work often involves arrangements of several standing cardboard figures. The first of these was Standing Army, an installation of 50 life-size soldiers made of found cardboard. The figures were based on those found in army recruiting materials, and were arranged in formations based on the Chinese Terracotta Army.

A second installation in this vein is Popes, an arrangement of 21 papal figures, each approximated four-feet tall and decorated with painting and metal leaf, installed in St. Paul the Apostle Church in autumn 2009.

Most Recently, Estabrook created Warriors of The Dragon's Teeth, a multi media installation done in Tbilisi Georgia in November 2015. This work is an exploration of the Myth of Jason and the Golden Fleece, which was taken from present day Georgia. The imagery here illustrates the warriors who grew from dragon's teeth the hero planted in the earth. The work uses this myth as springboard to discuss the interests of western neoliberal powers in countries of the former Soviet Union, such as Georgia.

== Drawings ==
Estabrook's art practice is founded in drawing, a medium which he often uses as a tool of political satire. His drawing projects include "Purple Pilot Pen Presidential Portraits", a piece in which all of the American presidents (as of 2005) were rendered hairless. He also uses shrinky dinks as a medium, creating "bug demons" of such figures as George W. Bush's cabinet ("Shrinky Dink Bug Demons, The President and His Cabinet") and Ronald McDonald (Swarm of Ronalds). At the root of this drawing are Estabrook's "Accretions", stream of consciousness drawings that organically grow onto the paper. Often these "Accretions" are done on scrolls, some measuring as long as 45 feet.

== Paintings ==
Estabrook uses painting to many ends. Most often, purposeful vandalism is his intention. Works in this vein include "An Army of One", in which he defaced army recruiting propaganda and then returned it to its distribution point. Related to this is the "Gun Mags" series in which Estabrook paints out all the text of gun magazine pages except sexualized words like "cock" or "butt". He then paints monsters on the guns and people posing with them.

Feel Remington's Beef, acrylic on magazine, 2008.

== Collaborations ==
In addition to his work as a solo artist, Estabrook often engages in collaborative art activities. The two most prominent of these are with the Artcodex collective, and with the Shining Mantis.

Artcodex is a loosely defined collective of artists the core of which is Estabrook and his partner Vandana Jain. Other members who’ve participated are Brian Higbee, Glen Eden Einbinder, Jennifer Berklich, and Manny Migrino. Artcodex have frequently engaged in “Social Sculpture” works, usually infused with humor and centered around political topics, such as war, gmo agriculture, and invasive plants.

The Shining Mantis was a collaboration between Estabrook and Ernest Concepcion known for their Kangarok epic: large-scale chalk drawings which are both a live drawing battle, and the depiction of one. They were also an experimental music ensemble with influences ranging from the minimalism to punk, metal, and noise.
