= Shadow Creek =

Shadow Creek may refer to:

- Shadow Creek Ranch, a master planned community in Pearland, Texas
- Shadow Creek Golf Course, an 18-hole golf course in North Las Vegas, Nevada
