= Charles Arbuckle =

American football player and coach (born 1968)

No. 81
- Position: Tight end

Personal information
- Born: September 13, 1968 (age 58); Beaumont, Texas, U.S.
- Listed height: 6 ft 3 in (1.91 m)
- Listed weight: 248 lb (112 kg)

Career information
- High school: Willowridge (Houston, Texas)
- College: UCLA
- NFL draft: 1990: 5th round, 125th overall pick

Career history

Playing
- New Orleans Saints (1990)*; Cleveland Browns (1991)*; San Diego Chargers (1991)*; Indianapolis Colts (1992–1993); Green Bay Packers (1994)*; Indianapolis Colts (1994–1995)
- * Offseason or practice squad member only

Coaching
- Arizona Hotshots (2019)

Awards and highlights
- Second-team All-American (1989)

Career NFL statistics
- Receptions: 33
- Receiving yards: 282
- Touchdowns: 1
- Stats at Pro Football Reference

Charles Edward Arbuckle (born September 13, 1968) is an American football coach and former professional tight end in the National Football League (NFL). He was drafted in the fifth round (125th overall) of the 1990 NFL Draft by the New Orleans Saints. He was recently the tight ends coach for the Arizona Hotshots of the Alliance of American Football (AAF), a position he took in 2019. He was a two-time All-American while playing college football with the UCLA Bruins. He played four seasons for the Indianapolis Colts (1992–1995). Arbuckle is a graduate of Willowridge High School (Houston) Class of 1986 and was one of the very successful group of football players that hail from Willowridge in the 1980s. He is also a color analyst for college football on ESPN College Football, ACCRSN and for college and NFL games on Sports USA radio.
