= Shadow Creek Ranch =

Planned community in Pearland, Texas, US

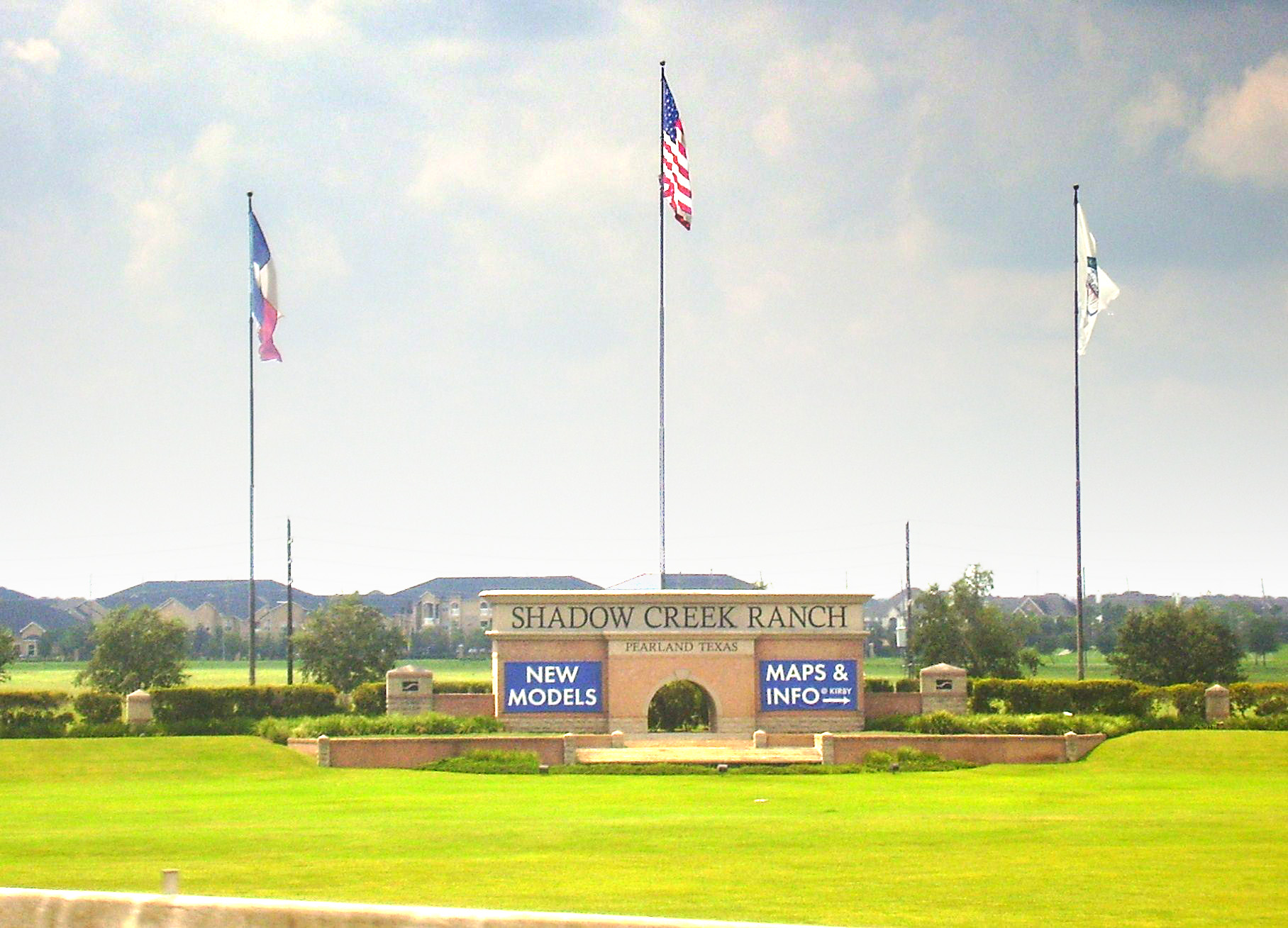
Shadow Creek Ranch

Shadow Creek Ranch is a planned community in Pearland, Texas, United States. Shadow Creek Ranch, which has 3,500 acres (1,400 ha) of space, is west of State Highway 288, south of Beltway 8, and about 10 miles (16 km) from the Texas Medical Center.

Shadow Creek Ranch, the largest planned community in Pearland, is a bedroom community for commuters to Houston. The construction of State Highway 288 led to the development. It has experienced solid population growth due to its proximity to Downtown Houston.

== History ==
The City of Pearland annexed areas that are now Shadow Creek Ranch in 1996, 1997, and 1998.

The community has been developed by the Shadow Creek Ranch Development Co. In 2001, sales of houses in Shadow Creek Ranch began. In June 2001 four lakes were created and 600 acres (240 ha) of land were excavated as part of the first phase of development. One of the companies that built 300 of the original houses was Perry Homes.

In 2014, the Houston Business Journal, in its Most Active Residential Communities List, ranked Shadow Creek Ranch at number six.

== Geography ==
The plans called for there to be about 12,000 housing units, including 6,200 single-family houses, when the development was fully built out. The lakes were scheduled to take up 300 acres (120 ha) of land.

As of 2007 the housing prices range from $150,000 to $1 million.(as of 2023 houses range from ~$300,000 to >$1,200,000) That year, David Goswick, a real estate advisor for the development, stated that the average sale price was $249,955.

In October 2016 the Texas Commission on Environmental Quality (TCEQ) identified the Blue Ridge Landfill as being the source of an odor along a section of SCR. The City of Pearland planned to hold a meeting on it in 2017.

== Economy ==
As of 2007 the Texas Medical Center houses the workplaces of most SCR residents.

The Shadow Creek Ranch Town Center, a 616,000 square feet (57,200 m^{2}) retail development near SCR that is named after the planned community, is located at the intersection of Texas State Highway 288 and Farm to Market Road 518. As of 2008 the center was 80% leased. Prior to 2008, WCF Development, Transwestern Development Co. and Buchanan Street Partners owned the center. In 2008 JPMorgan and an affiliate fund of AmREIT closed a deal which let them purchase the center for an amount not disclosed to the public.

Kelsey-Seybold Clinic has its corporate headquarters in Shadow Creek Ranch.

== Education ==
=== Primary and secondary schools ===
==== Public schools ====
The Brazoria County portion of Shadow Creek Ranch is within the Alvin Independent School District. The Fort Bend County portion, the subdivision called the Village of Diamond Bay, is in the Fort Bend Independent School District.

===== Alvin Independent School District =====
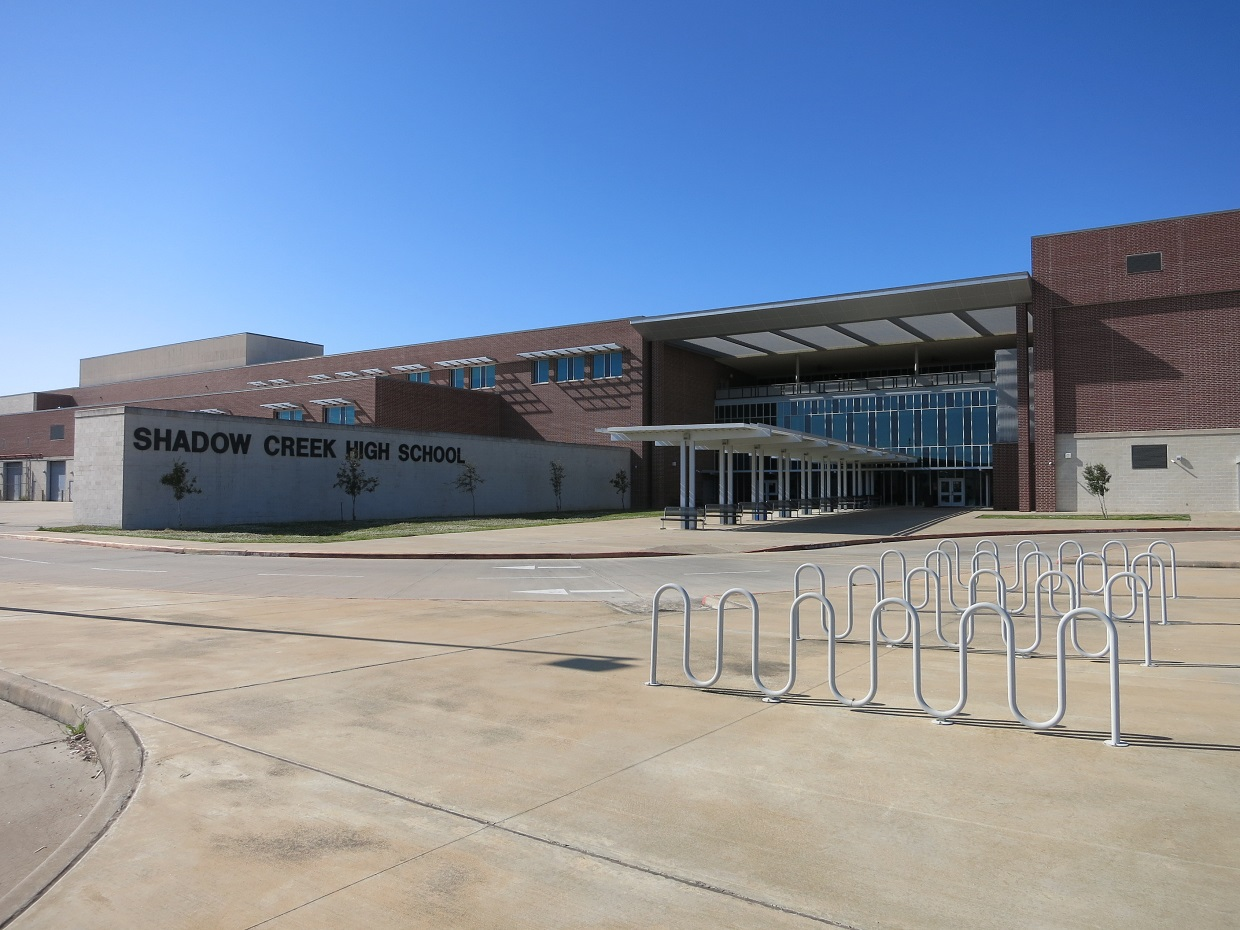
Shadow Creek High School

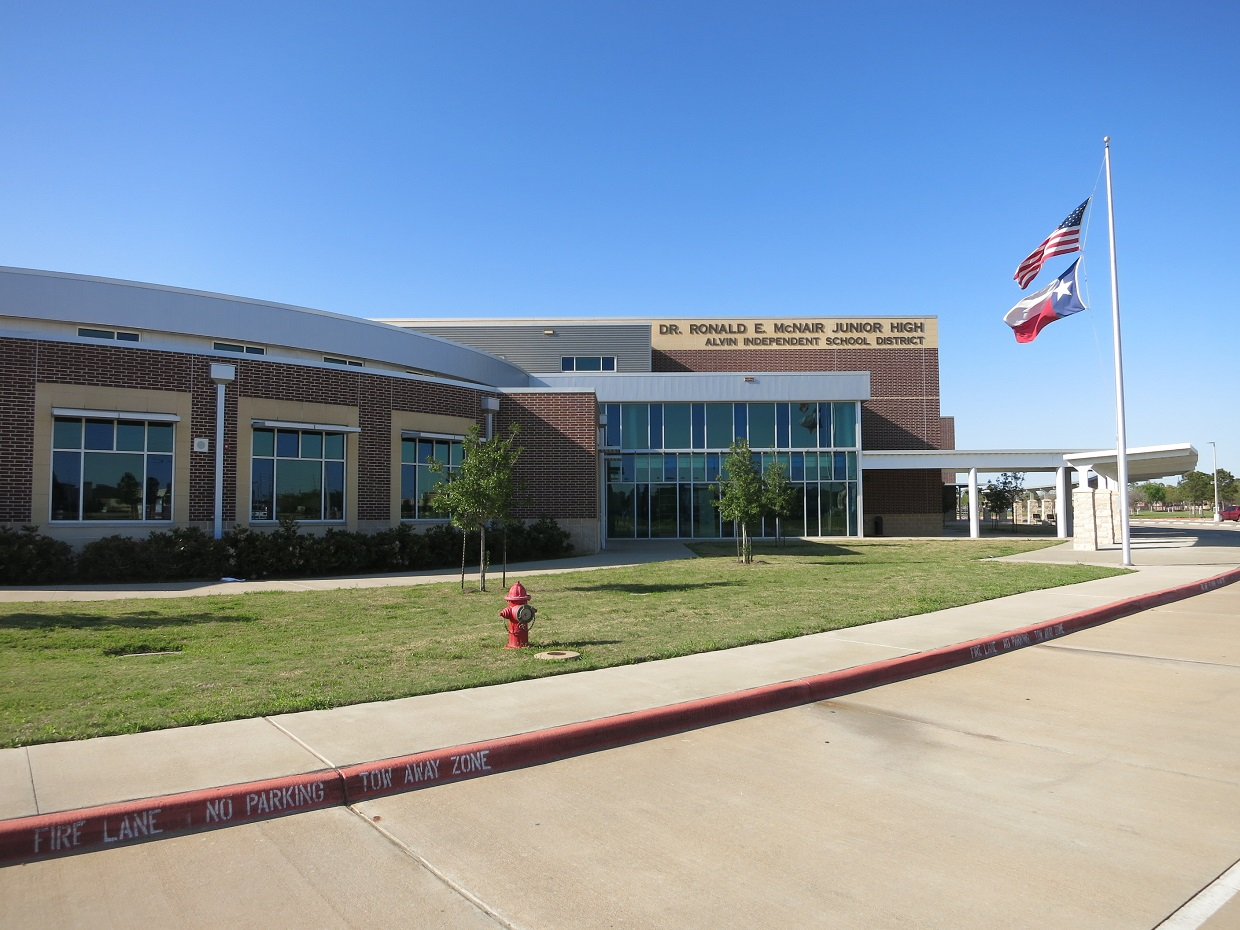
Ronald E. McNair Junior High School

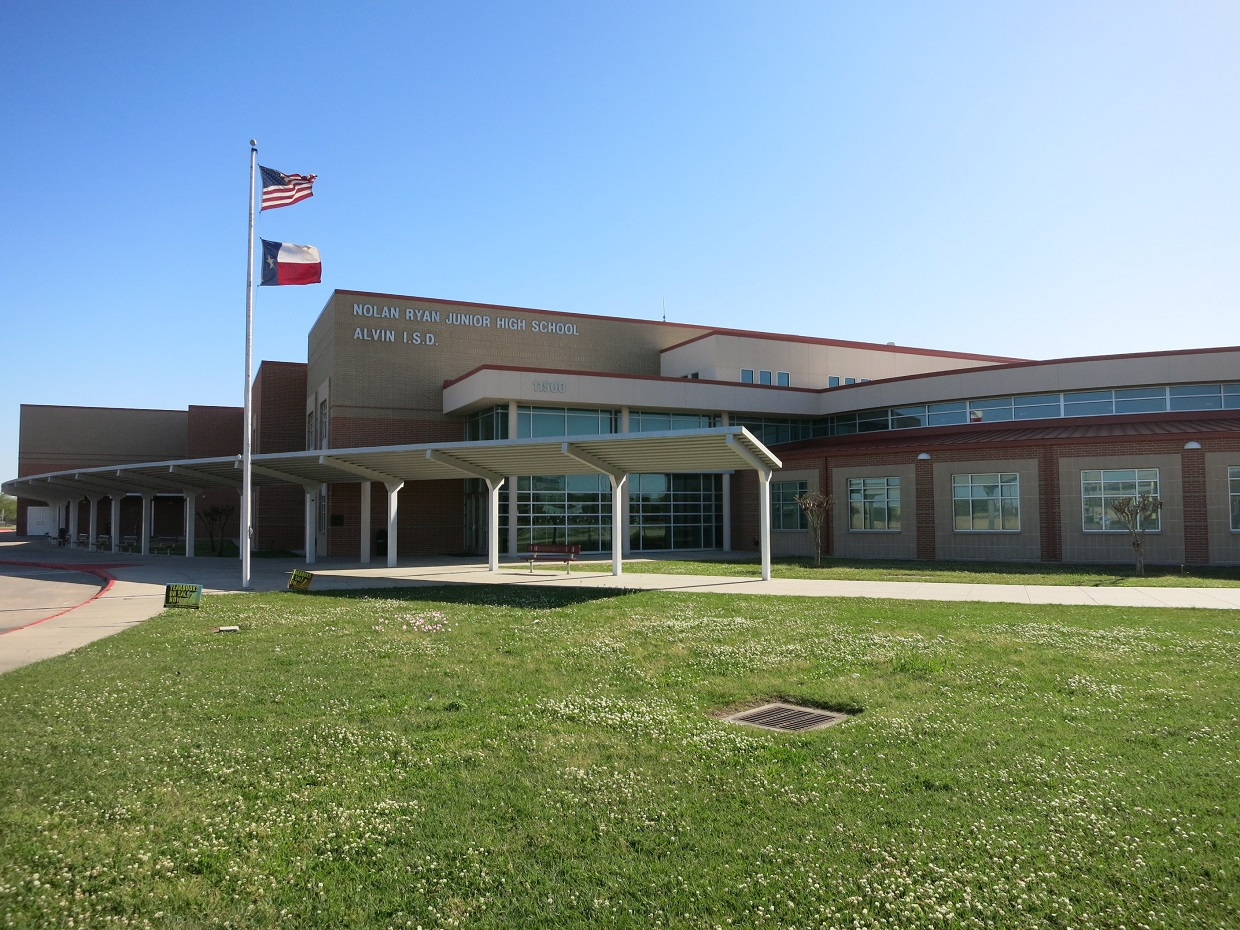
Nolan Ryan Junior High School

Students are zoned to:

Elementary schools:

- Mary Burks Marek Elementary School (The Village of Emerald Bay)
- Laura Ingalls Wilder Elementary (northern parts of The Village of Reflection Bay and The Village of Biscayne Bay)
- Glenn York Elementary School (southern parts of The Village of Reflection Bay and The Village of Biscayne Bay)
- Shirley Dill Brothers Elementary School (newer school of the system) (students from the newer parts of SCR)
- Some of these schools, although once top rated schools, have become "title 1" schools and their ratings have dropped (see Marek Elem.)
- Secondary schools:
- Dr. Ronald E. McNair Junior High School (newer parts of SCR)
- Nolan Ryan Junior High School
  - Ryan opened circa in August 2008. The first principal was Deborah Roberson. Ryan, as of 2014, had 1,196 students. The school regularly holds an international festival.
- Shadow Creek High School (essentially all of SCR and southern trails go to SCHS)

In 2016 11th grade students were allowed to choose between Manvel High School (Manvel) and the new Shadow Creek High School, but in fall 2017 Shadow Creek HS became the only high school assigned to SCR. Previously Manvel High School was the assigned high school for SCR. A portion of SCR was formerly zoned to Rodeo Palms Junior High School.

Prior to the opening of Manvel High in fall 2006, students were zoned to Alvin High School in the city of Alvin, and prior to the opening of Nolan Ryan students were zoned to Manvel Junior High School. Prior to the opening of Marek in fall 2004, all Shadow Creek Ranch students were zoned to Don Jeter Elementary School in unincorporated Brazoria County

In 2015 Children at Risk, a nonprofit organization, gave favorable rankings to the AISD schools serving SCR.

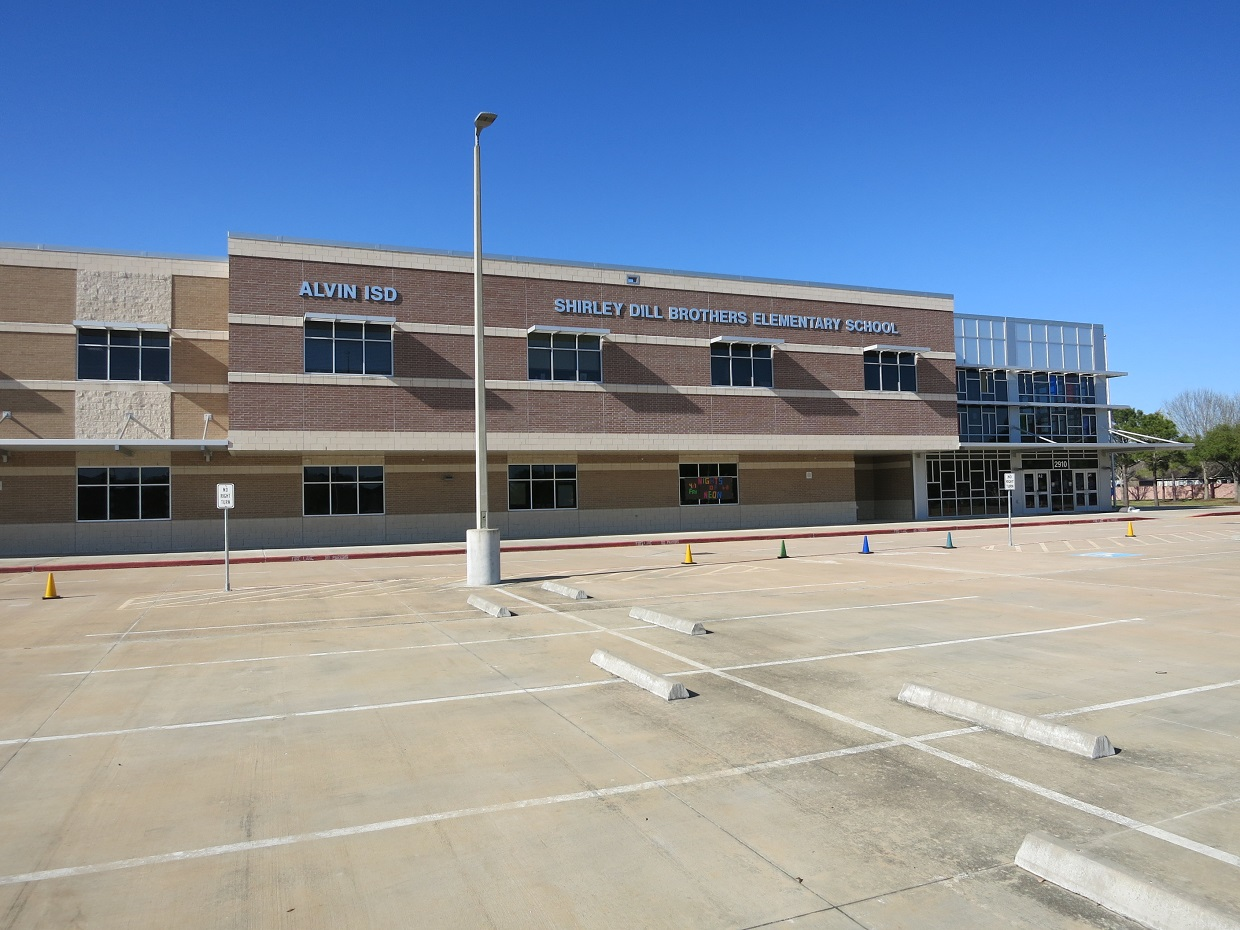
Shirley Dill Brothers Elementary School

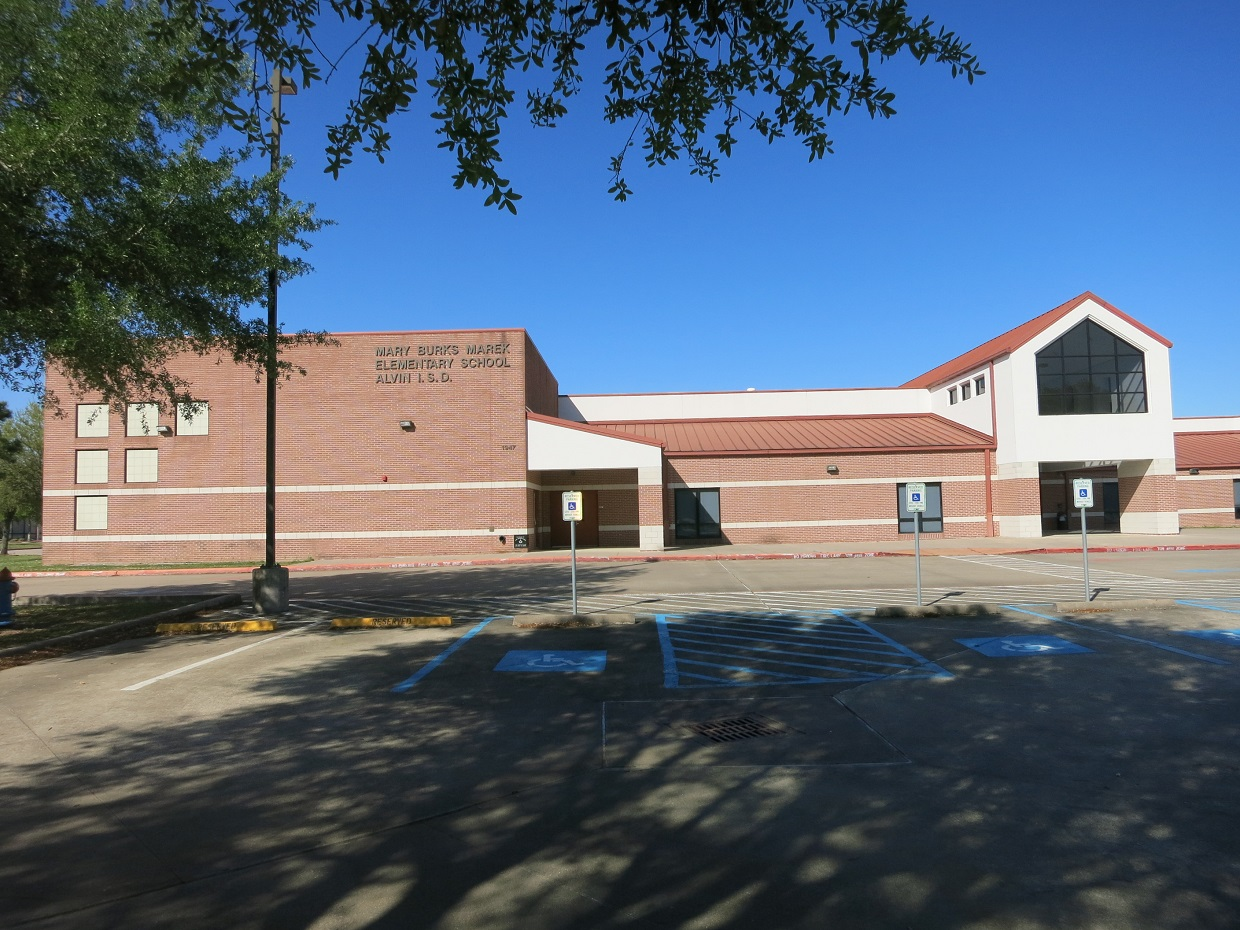
Mary Burks Marek Elementary School

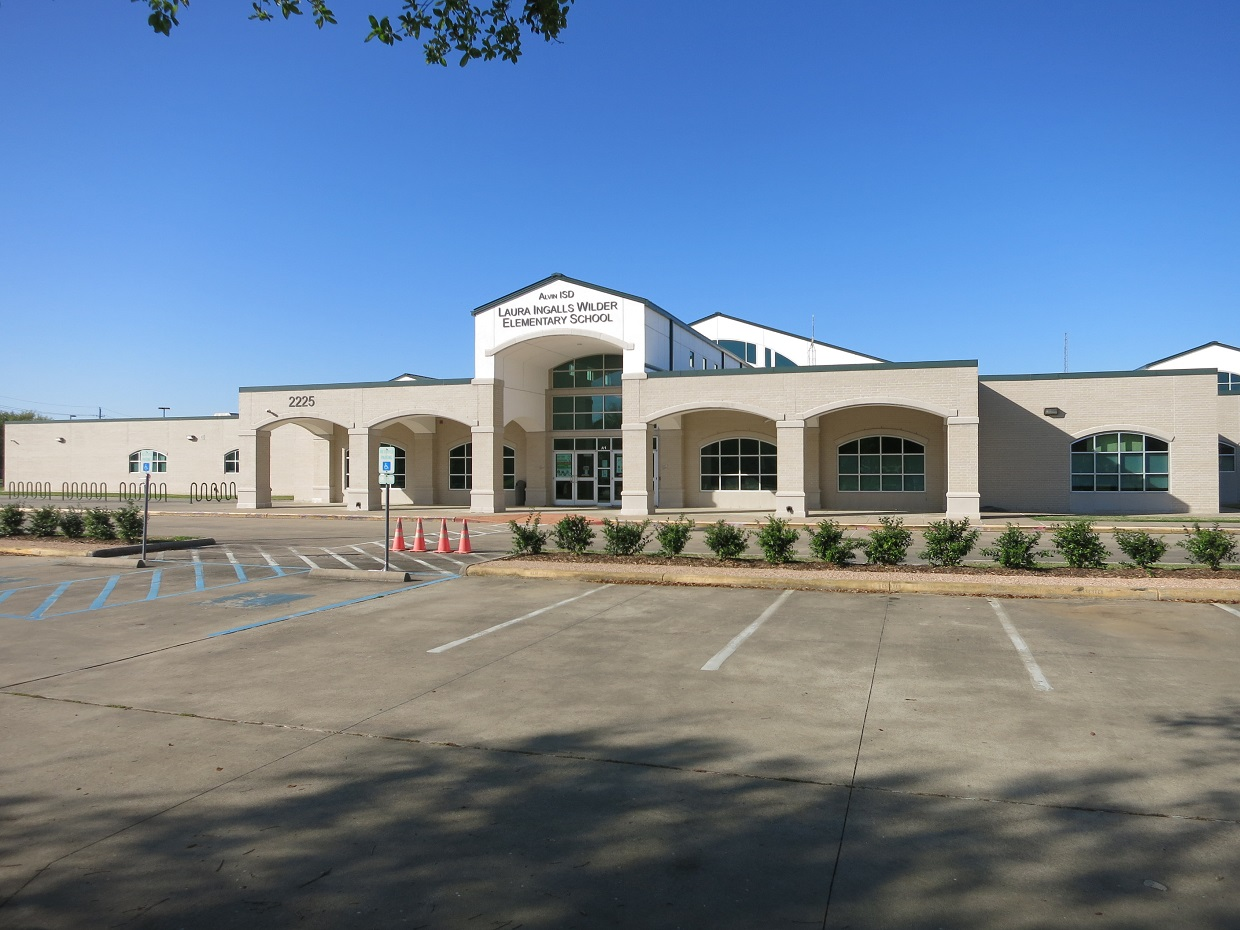
Laura Ingalls Wilder Elementary School

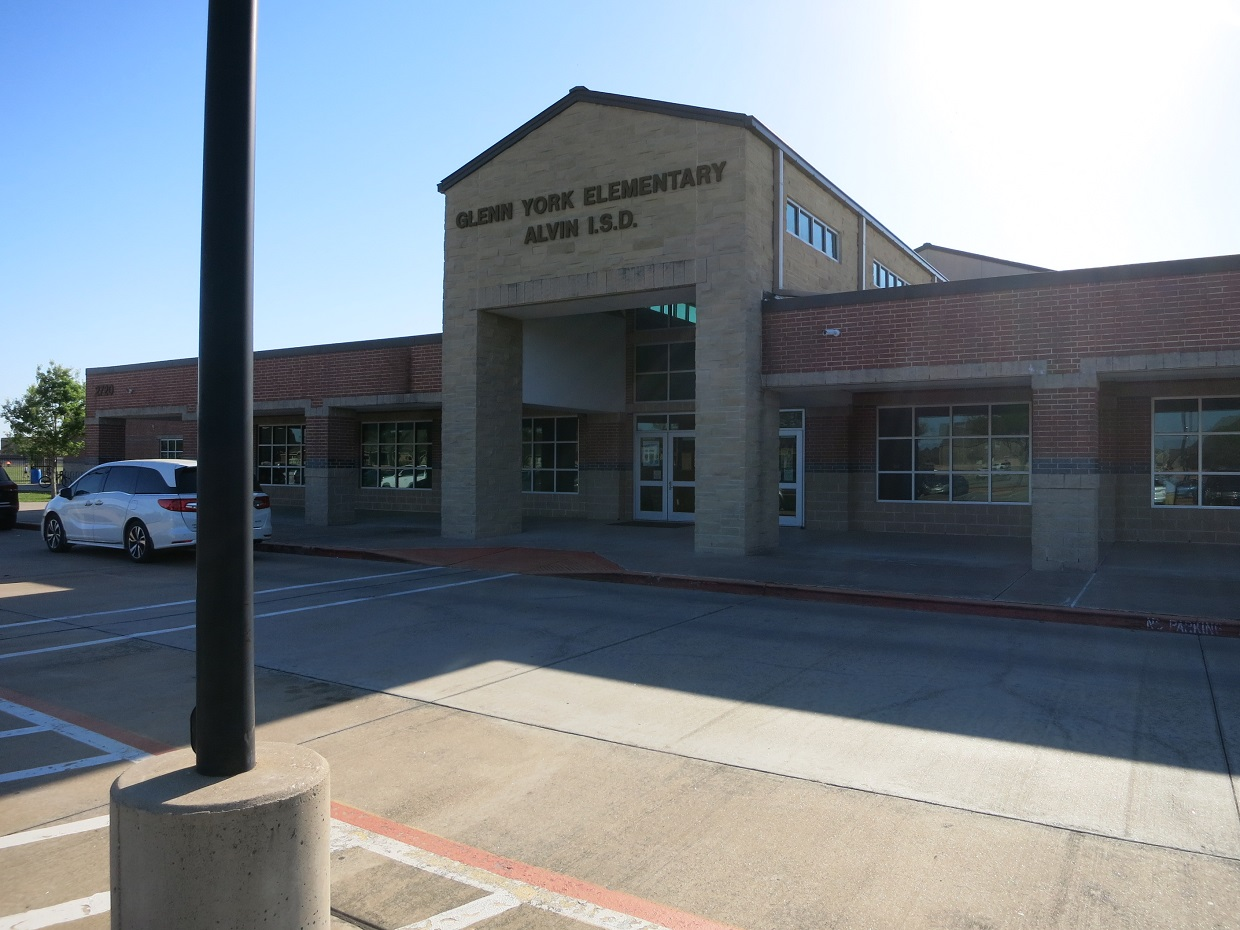
Glenn York Elementary School

===== Fort Bend Independent School District =====
Zoned schools include the following, all in the Blue Ridge area of Houston :

- Blue Ridge Elementary School
- Christa McAuliffe Middle School
- Willowridge High School

Students who attend the FBISD schools use school buses, as the schools serving the community are about 3 miles (4.8 km) away from the FBISD section while AISD schools are about 1 mile (1.6 km) away. In 2015 Children at Risk gave low rankings to the FBISD schools serving SCR. The Fort Bend County portions of SCR include: Arbor Lakes, Autumn Brook, Azalea Creek, Black Berry, Brook Run, Cedar Wood, Country Glen, Eden Cove, Edgewater, Holly Landing, Lake Meadows, Pelican Shore, Orchard Village, Piney Trails, West Haven, Westwood Spring, and Windy Shore.

Around 2005 the president of the Shadow Creek Ranch Development, Gary Cook, asked Alvin ISD to make an exception for its transfer policy for Shadow Creek Ranch residents living in Fort Bend County. The Alvin ISD school board approved the policy, and beginning in the 2005–2006 school year students in kindergarten through sixth grade in the Fort Bend County portion were allowed to transfer to Alvin ISD until Fort Bend ISD builds schools to accommodate Shadow Creek Ranch children in its area. Previously some residents also got transfers to Pearland Independent School District (PISD) schools. In 2007 a section of SCR in FBISD was rezoned from Hightower High School to Willowridge prior to its development. By 2016 transfers generally were no longer issued as AISD and PISD schools became overcrowded, and some residents proposed seceding from FBISD and joining AISD.

==== Private schools ====
The Roman Catholic Archdiocese of Galveston–Houston operates the St. Helen School, a K–8 parochial school, in Pearland. St. Helen is east of Shadow Creek Ranch.

=== Public libraries ===
Pearland Westside: 39,000 sq ft. built ~2022 with 14.5 million dollars from the county.

11801 Shadow Creek Pkwy, Pearland, TX

Old Pearland Library: The Brazoria County Library System operates the Pearland Westside Library, located on 6,000 square feet (560 m^{2}) of space in an area at the intersection of Business Center Drive at Memorial Hermann Drive, behind the H-E-B Plus in the Shadow Creek Ranch Town Center. (It is not actually in the town center, it is across the street to it.) (no longer an active library)

=== Colleges and universities ===
Additionally, Alvin Community College provides basic undergraduate courses and adult education; the AISD portion is in the ACC taxation zone.

== Parks and recreation ==
According to the development plans by the Shadow Creek Ranch Development Co., parks, hike and bike trails, and parks are to occupy over 700 acres (280 ha) of land in Shadow Creek Ranch.

In 2003 the developers of the community donated 120-acre (49 ha) of parkland along Kingsley Drive, north of Shadow Creek Parkway in the northeast of the community, to the City of Pearland. At the time, the land was worth over $11 million. This land was scheduled to be used as a regional sports park. KGA Deforest was hired as the landscape architecture firm for the new park.

-the Sports Complex at Shadow Creek Ranch is the resulting sports park.

== See also ==
- Silverlake, Texas
