= Allen Aldridge =

American football player (1972–2024)

No. 57, 55
- Positions: Linebacker, long snapper

Personal information
- Born: May 30, 1972; Houston, Texas, U.S.
- Died: September 8, 2024 (aged 52); Houston, Texas, U.S.
- Listed height: 6 ft 1 in (1.85 m)
- Listed weight: 254 lb (115 kg)

Career information
- High school: Willowridge (Houston)
- College: Houston
- NFL draft: 1994: 2nd round, 51st overall pick

Career history
- Denver Broncos (1994–1997); Detroit Lions (1998–2001); Houston Texans (2002)*
- * Offseason or practice squad member only

Awards and highlights
- Super Bowl champion (XXXII); Second-team All-SWC (1992)

Career NFL statistics
- Tackles: 482
- Solo: 351
- Tackles for loss: 18
- Interceptions: 1
- Forced fumbles: 5
- Fumble recoveries: 4
- Sacks: 10.5
- Stats at Pro Football Reference

Allen Ray Aldridge Jr. (May 30, 1972 – September 8, 2024) was an American professional football player who was a linebacker and long snapper in the National Football League (NFL). He played college football for the Houston Cougars. He was selected by the Denver Broncos in the second round of the 1994 NFL draft and later won Super Bowl XXXII with the team over the Green Bay Packers.

Aldridge also played for the Detroit Lions and Houston Texans.

== Professional career ==
=== Denver Broncos ===
Aldridge was drafted by the Denver Broncos in the second round of the 1994 NFL draft. He started at middle linebacker in Super Bowl XXXII against the Green Bay Packers. He played for them from 1994 to 1997. During the four years he started 45 of 64 games, recording 227 tackles and 1.5 sacks.

=== Detroit Lions ===
Aldridge signed with the Detroit Lions before the 1998 season. He played for the team from 1998 to 2001. In the fours years he started 59 of 64 games, recording 237 tackles, nine sacks and an interception. He also served as the Lions' long snapper for punt coverage.

=== NFL statistics ===
| Year | Team | Games | Combined tackles | Tackles | Assisted tackles | Sacks | Forced fumbles | Fumble recoveries | Fumble return yards | Interceptions | Interception return yards | Yards per interception return | Longest interception return | Interceptions returned for touchdown | Passes defended |
|---|---|---|---|---|---|---|---|---|---|---|---|---|---|---|---|
| 1994 | DEN | 16 | 1 | 1 | 0 | 0.0 | 0 | 0 | 0 | 0 | 0 | 0 | 0 | 0 | 0 |
| 1995 | DEN | 16 | 89 | 65 | 24 | 1.5 | 1 | 1 | 0 | 0 | 0 | 0 | 0 | 0 | 3 |
| 1996 | DEN | 16 | 81 | 67 | 14 | 0.0 | 1 | 0 | 0 | 0 | 0 | 0 | 0 | 0 | 6 |
| 1997 | DEN | 16 | 56 | 39 | 17 | 0.0 | 1 | 0 | 0 | 0 | 0 | 0 | 0 | 0 | 4 |
| 1998 | DET | 16 | 68 | 46 | 22 | 3.0 | 1 | 1 | 0 | 0 | 0 | 0 | 0 | 0 | 1 |
| 1999 | DET | 16 | 64 | 40 | 24 | 3.0 | 0 | 1 | 0 | 0 | 0 | 0 | 0 | 0 | 5 |
| 2000 | DET | 16 | 58 | 40 | 18 | 2.0 | 2 | 1 | 0 | 1 | 4 | 4 | 4 | 0 | 2 |
| 2001 | DET | 16 | 47 | 32 | 15 | 1.0 | 0 | 0 | 0 | 0 | 0 | 0 | 0 | 0 | 0 |
| Career | | 128 | 464 | 330 | 134 | 10.5 | 6 | 4 | 0 | 1 | 4 | 4 | 4 | 0 | 21 |

== Death ==
Aldridge died in Houston on September 8, 2024, at the age of 52.
