= Blue Ridge, Houston =

Neighborhood of Houston, Texas

Coordinates: 29.600°N 95.480°W

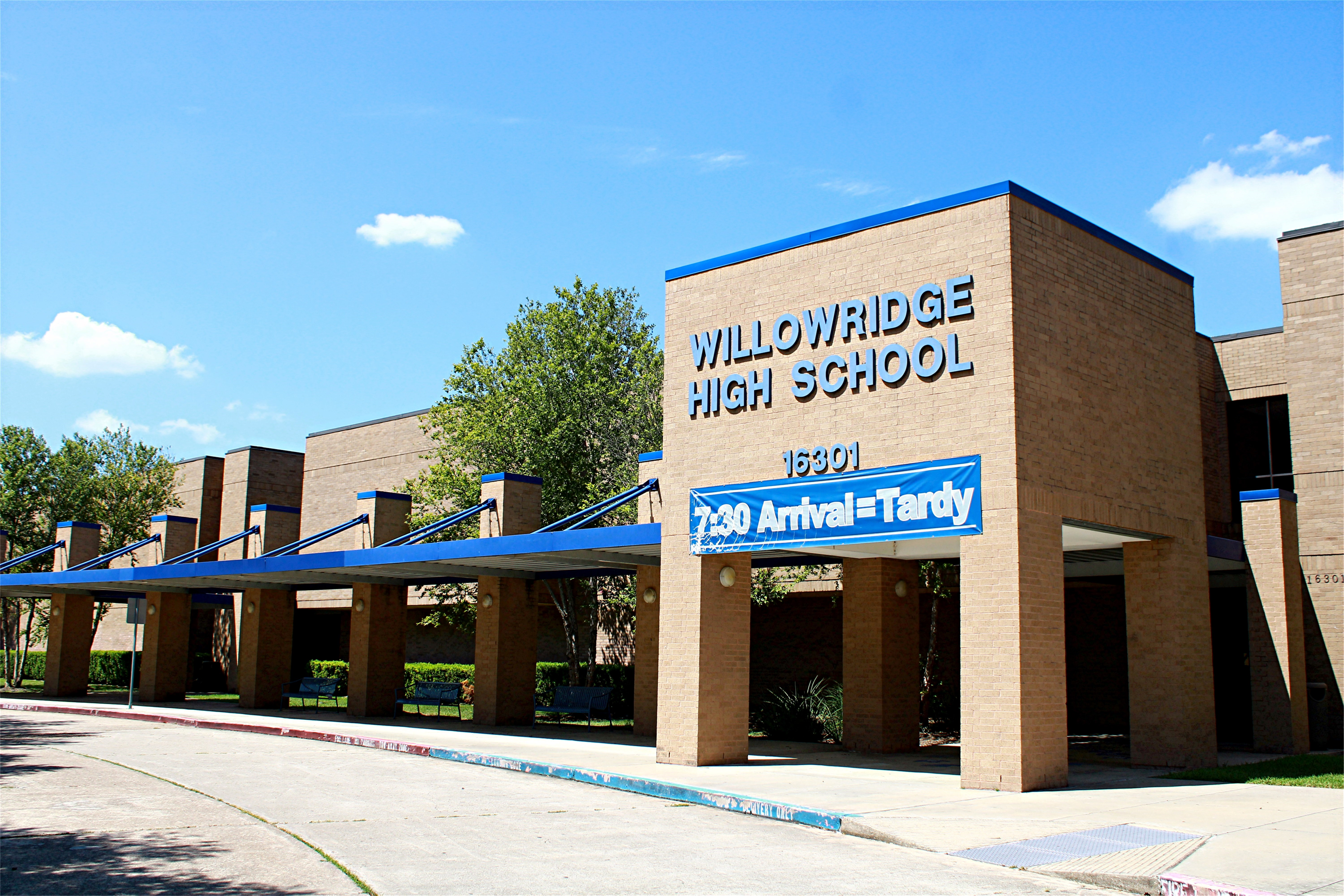
Willowridge High School

Blue Ridge is a community in Houston, Texas, United States that used to be a distinct unincorporated area in northeast Fort Bend County. The community, which was also known as Hobby, is located on a ridge of Oyster Creek, 16 miles (26 km) east of Richmond. The section of Blue Ridge within the Houston City Limits is known as the Fort Bend-Houston Super Neighborhood #41.

== History ==
The area now known as Blue Ridge was a part of Stephen F. Austin's first colony. The site itself began to be permanently occupied in the late 19th century. As an independent community Blue Ridge did not have any post offices. The W. Allen Robinson family arrived in Blue Ridge in 1894, and in the 1890s the family established a ranch headquarters. Oil was discovered near Blue Ridge in 1919, and a salt mine opened shortly afterwards. In 1925 gas was discovered in the area. As resources were discovered, banks and gambling houses opened and the Handbook of Texas stated that Blue Ridge became a "boomtown". In 1936 the 4,348-acre (1,760 ha) Blue Ridge State Prison Farm incorporated the area, and most Blue Ridge residents were staff members at the facility. Blue Ridge acted as a satellite work camp for the Central Prison Farm.

In 1958 the Texas Department of Corrections voted to sell the prison lands to private developers. The houses were developed in the 1960s and 1970s. Parts of the area were annexed by Houston in the early 1970s. The first population figure for the community was of the year 1970, when the community had 50 residents and no businesses. The former prison inmate housing compound is the current location of Willowridge High School.

== Cityscape ==
The Houston Fort Bend Super Neighborhood has its boundaries as Beltway 8, Fondren Road, Hiram Clarke Road, and McHard Road. Its area is almost 8 square miles (21 km^{2}). Many churches of various ethnic groups and religions are supported by the Blue Ridge community. Carol E. Vaughn of the Houston Chronicle said that the 5-acre (2.0 ha) area, before the formation of the super neighborhood, "has considered itself a stepchild of sorts in the past, an area unwittingly passed back and forth between parents." Half of the community has a Missouri City zip code (77489) west of Chimney Rock - a majority of residents still refer to this section as Missouri City even though it is not located inside the Missouri City city limits. Residents who still use the Missouri City designation are known as Missouri City by Choice residents.

== Government ==
Blue Ridge is within Houston City Council District K. Prior to 2011 it was a part of city council district D.

In the final Mayor of Houston election before 2002, over 6,000 people there voted for Lee P. Brown.

== Transportation ==
Metropolitan Transit Authority of Harris County (METRO) operates public bus services.

In 1990 members of the Ridgegate and Briargate subdivisions protested proposed bus services from METRO.

== Education ==
=== Primary and secondary schools ===
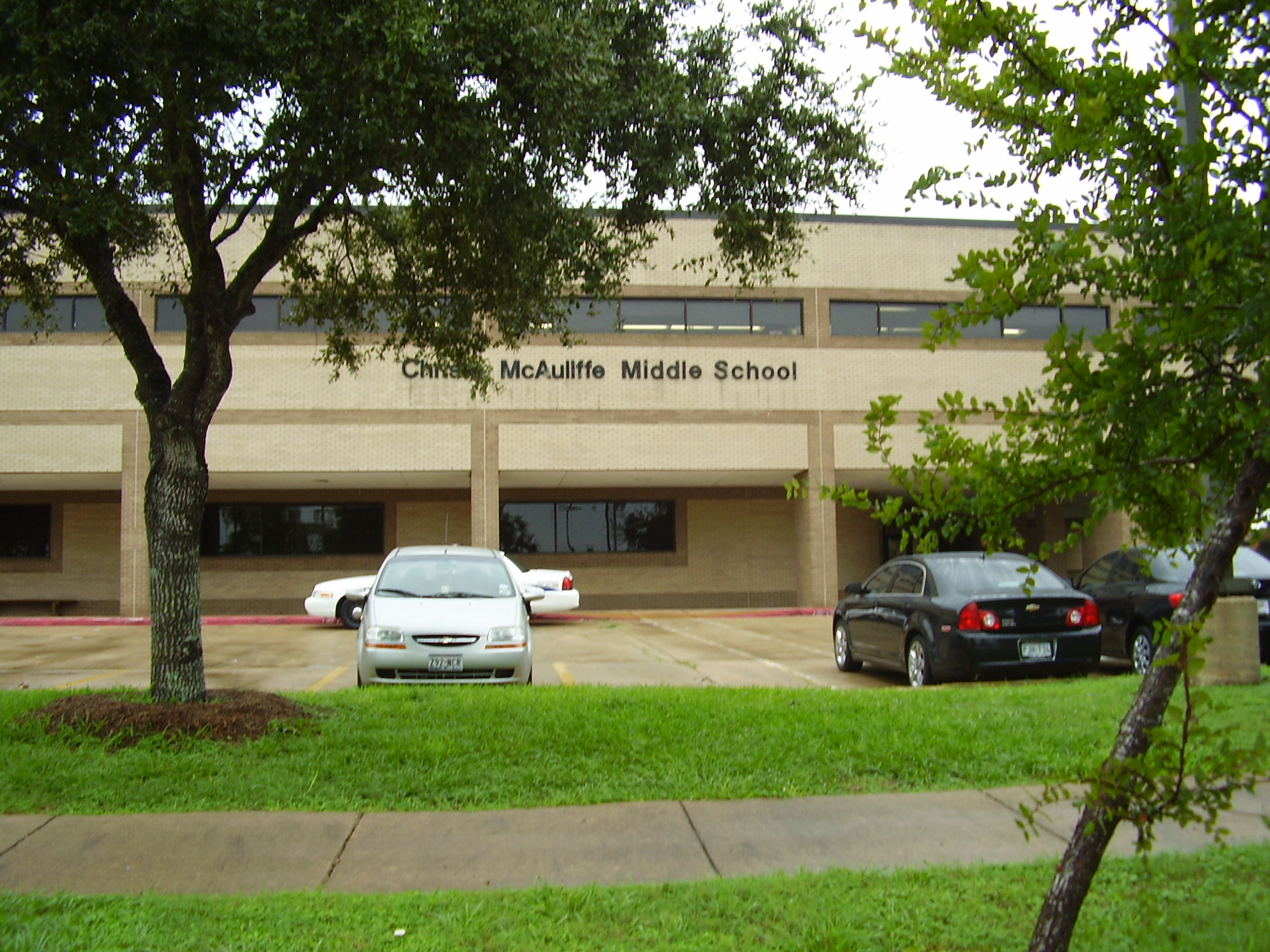
Christa McAuliffe Middle School

Blue Ridge is within the Fort Bend Independent School District. The community is within the East Division, controlling school board slots 5 through 7. As an independent community Blue Ridge did not have any schools.

Zoned schools include:

- Briargate-Blue Ridge Elementary School
- Ridgegate Elementary School
- Ridgemont Elementary School
- Christa McAuliffe Middle School
- Willowridge High School

Blue Ridge Elementary School was occupied in August 1969. Ridgemont was occupied in August 1973. Briargate was occupied in the fall of 1977. Willowridge's phase one began construction in February 1978 and opened in September 1979. Ridgegate was occupied in January 1981. McAuliffe was occupied in the northern hemisphere fall of 1986. Phase two of Willowridge was completed in the summer of 1992. Blue Ridge and Briargate elementaries consolidated in 2023, with a new campus being built on the Briargate location, due to decreased enrollments.

=== Public libraries ===
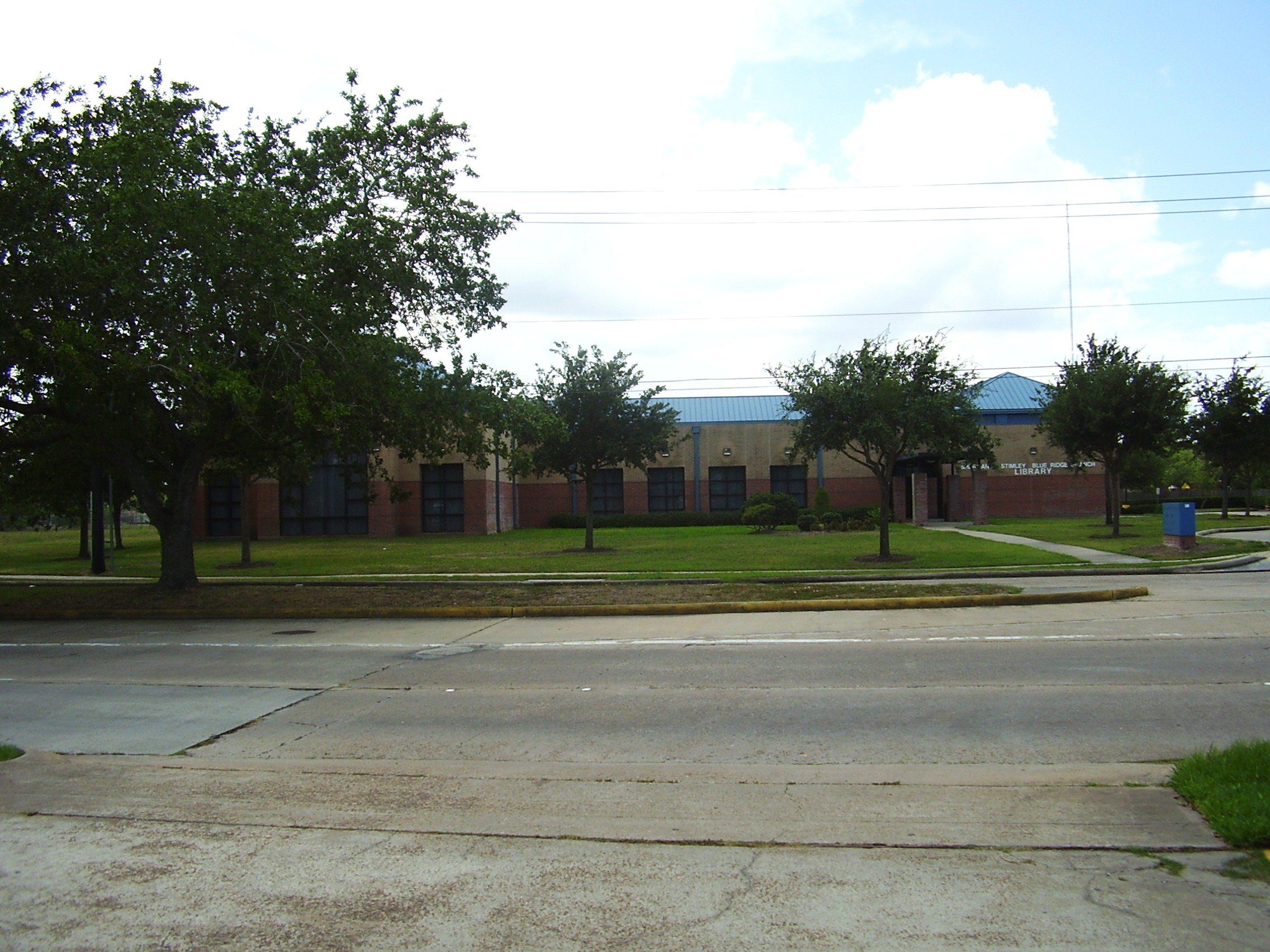
Stimley-Blue Ridge Library

The Stimley-Blue Ridge Library of the Houston Public Library is located at 7007 West Fuqua in Blue Ridge. In 1997 the library was named after Sherman E. Stimley, the first African-American law associate of the firm Vinson & Elkins. In 1985 Stimley started the first consulting company exclusively dealing with tax-exempt bond law that was headed by an African-American in Houston. Stimley had books as an interest.

== Parks and recreation ==
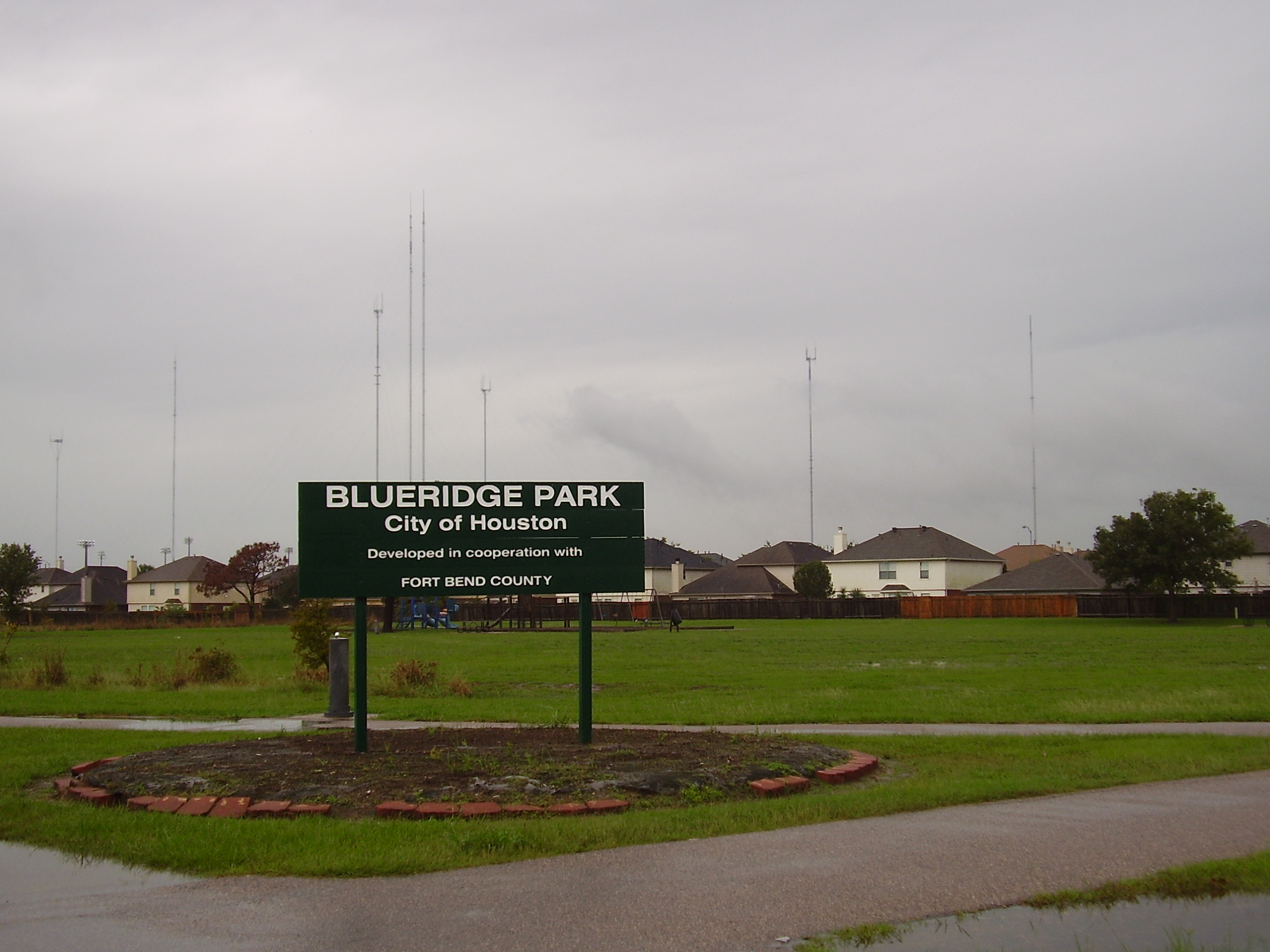
Blueridge Park

The Blueridge Park, operated by the City of Houston's Parks and Recreation Department, is in Blue Ridge. Fort Bend County operates the Post Oak Park. The 23-acre (93,000 m^{2}) park includes three baseball fields, one concession stand, one softball field, and one toilet facility.
