= Selwyn Jones =

American football player (born 1970)

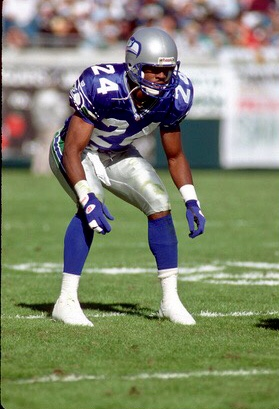
- Jones with the Seattle Seahawks

No. 22, 27, 24
- Position: Cornerback

Personal information
- Born: May 13, 1970 (age 56); Houston, Texas, U.S.
- Listed height: 6 ft 0 in (1.83 m)
- Listed weight: 192 lb (87 kg)

Career information
- High school: Willowridge (Houston)
- College: Colorado State
- NFL draft: 1992: 7th round, 177th overall pick

Career history
- Cleveland Browns (1992–1994); New Orleans Saints (1994); Seattle Seahawks (1995–1996); Denver Broncos (1997)

Awards and highlights
- Second-team All-WAC (1990)

Career NFL statistics
- Tackles: 69
- Interceptions: 4
- Fumble recoveries: 1
- Stats at Pro Football Reference

Selwyn Aldridge Jones (born May 13, 1970) is an American former professional football player who was a cornerback for six seasons in the National Football League (NFL). He played college football for the Colorado State Rams.

At the time of his entering the NFL draft, Jones had set the career record for interceptions with 15 at Colorado State University. He finished the 1990 season with six interceptions. Jones was invited to play in the Senior Bowl and the East West Shrine game but couldn't attend due to a hip injury. He was the #5 rated NFL cornerback prospect heading into his senior year at Colorado State by USA Today in 1991. Jones was selected by the Cleveland Browns in the seventh round of the draft with the 177th overall pick in April 1992 and placed on injured reserve. Jones returned to action for the 1993 season under Bill Belichick and Nick Saban with 24 tackles and 3 interceptions for the Cleveland Browns. Jones intercepted David Klingler of the Cincinnati Bengals twice in a September 5, 1993, nationally televised game. He hauled in another interception against Steve Young and the 49ers the very next week in a Monday night match-up. The 1994 season saw Jones get released mid-year from the Browns and join the New Orleans Saints in late October 1994. Jones made 2 starts and played in 7 games for the Saints. As a free agent, he signed a 2-year $1.9 million deal with the Seattle Seahawks in 1995. He played in 12 games that season. Jones completed the 1996 season with one interception and 24 tackles. Jones signed with the Denver Broncos in May 1997 and won the starting right cornerback spot prior to sustaining a left knee injury early in the season and was placed on season-ending injured reserve. In Super Bowl XXXII, the Broncos defeated the Green Bay Packers thus earning the city of Denver and Jones their first Super Bowl ring in February 1998.

== Personal life ==
Jones' parents are Alvin and Shirley Jones. He has two brothers, named Alvin Jr. and Avery. He is married to Raquel Ramirez. Raquel is the Founder of the non-profit organization "Daughter's Gather At The Table" and a prominent Fashion Influencer. The couple's daughter, Anastaja, started as a true freshman for the North Carolina Central University volleyball team. Anastaja graduated from the University of Houston in 2019. Jones and his family reside in the Lake Conroe, Texas area where he is a Purchasing Manager for a Fortune 500 company. Also, public records show that Selwyn and Raquel own several properties across Texas and one in Northern Colorado. Selwyn is not the only member of the Jones' family to achieve stardom. His younger brother (Avery) achieved huge success as a music producer with tracks on 50 Cents & Juvenile hit albums to name a few. Public records show multiple houses in Texas are owned by Avery as well. Avery now owns several mobile barbershops that have taken over the Houston area. With over 150 active clients, "Stop N Style" mobile barbershops have been in business since 2014.
