= Kelsey-Seybold Clinic =

- UnitedHealth Group

Geography
- Location: Pearland, Texas, United States
- Coordinates: 29.565341°N 95.388511°W

Organization
- Care system: Multispecialty clinic system, healthcare research
- Type: Primary Care/Teaching/Specialty Care
- Affiliated university: Baylor College of Medicine and UTHealth through affiliation with Baylor St. Luke's Medical Center

Services
- Standards: AAAHC Certified
- Emergency department: Level II trauma centers located throughout Houston
- Beds: over 1200 in related hospitals

History
- Founded: 1949

Links
- Website: Official Website

The Kelsey-Seybold Clinic is a large multi-specialty clinic system located in Greater Houston with its administrative headquarters in Shadow Creek Ranch, Pearland. The clinic system is a major provider of healthcare for NASA and a center for healthcare research. In April, 2022, UnitedHealth Group's Optum, Inc. acquired Kelsey-Seybold Clinic.

== History ==
The formation of starting 1949 by Dr. Mavis P. Kelsey with the purpose of combining primary and specialty medical services in one location in the city of Houston. This was a popular concept of the day based on the Mayo Clinic model. These types of clinics bring specialists, primary care physicians, nurses, medical laboratory scientists, and other care givers together as a team.

In 1949, Dr. Kelsey, an internal medicine specialist, leased space in the Hermann Professional Building and set up his practice. Over the next two years, he would welcome two of his Mayo friends, Dr. William D. Seybold, a surgeon, and Dr. William V. Leary, another internist, to the practice.

Dr. Kelsey's brother, John R. Kelsey, Jr., another Mayo-trained physician and specialist in gastroenterology, joined the practice in 1953. Also joining the multi-specialty team in the 1950s were a psychiatrist, cardiologist and rheumatologist. In 1953, Clinic doctors began serving rotations at area hospitals, including Hermann Hospital, Baylor University Medical College (now Baylor College of Medicine), and M.D. Anderson Cancer Center.

On December 15, 1956, the Kelsey and Leary Foundation for the Advancement of Medicine was established to provide scholarships and financial support for research. The Kelsey Foundation, as it is known today, is involved in a variety of research projects with universities, pharmaceutical companies, government bodies and hospitals in the Texas Medical Center. Research areas include cancer, epilepsy, cardiology, diabetes and obstetrics.

During the 1960s, the Clinic added more specialists and more departments. The rapidly expanding Radiology Department added lab technicians, while the multi-specialty team continued to grow with the addition of a pediatrician and otolaryngologist (Ear, Nose & Throat specialist). New departments included Pediatrics, Rheumatology, Dermatology, Urology, Ophthalmology and Dentistry.

In 1964, the Clinic moved into new facilities at 6624 Fannin. That building is now the St. Luke's Medical Tower. Dr. Leary joined the staff of M.D. Anderson Cancer Center in 1965 and the Clinic's name was changed to Kelsey-Seybold Clinic. For over half a century, the Kelsey-Seybold name has been synonymous with multi-specialty healthcare in Houston.

In 2020, Kelsey-Seybold Clinic relationship with Blue Cross and Blue Shield of Texas was renewed.

In 2021, a clinic in the River Oaks Shopping Center opened.

== Affiliation with NASA ==
In 1966, the Clinic became the first contract medical service provider for the National Aeronautics and Space Administration (NASA). Dr. Stanton P. Fischer, a pulmonologist, joined the staff a year earlier and assisted in providing executive physical examinations on NASA employees and other contractors.

Throughout the clinic's long association with NASA, they have contributed medical support services to the Apollo, Skylab, Apollo–Soyuz and Space Shuttle and International Space Station (ISS). Concerning the ISS, Kelsey-Seybold has provided a NASA Support Physician in Moscow since the inception of the International Space Station. Dr. Jose F. Flores has served in that capacity since 1998. Additionally, Dr. Flores provides medical support at all Soyuz launches in Baikonur, Kazakhstan involving American astronauts and has also provided medical support at certain Soyuz landings. Flores attended the launch of Zarya, the first uncrewed module launched by Russia in 1998 and has attended every crewed Soyuz launch with an American astronaut on board to the present day. Kelsey-Seybold also provides contract medical services in six locations in the U.S.

== Patients served ==
Among the many patients who came to Kelsey-Seybold Clinic in the late 60s and 70s were entertainers like Roy Rogers and international patients from Saudi Arabia, India, and Africa. More Latin Americans visited Kelsey-Seybold Clinic than any other U.S. clinic during this period.

In 1971, KSC opened its first neighborhood health center on Post Oak in the Uptown District of Houston. The success of that health center resulted in other locations being operated in downtown Houston, Sugar Land, The Woodlands and by Intercontinental Airport. Today, Kelsey-Seybold Clinic operates more than 35 neighborhood health centers in the Greater Houston area.

== Current administrators and expansion ==
In 1978, Dr. James C. Hoyle joined the staff of Pediatrics. Dr. Hoyle is the current medical director, Clinical Operations. In 1980, Dr. Spencer R. Berthelsen, an internist and current chairman of the Board joined the group.

Dr. William Seybold retired in 1979 and Dr. Mavis Kelsey retired in 1986. The Clinic they founded continued to increase its presence in the Houston service sector.

In 1999, Kelsey-Seybold Clinic moved into the current Main Campus at 2727 West Holcombe Blvd. The 400,000-square-foot (37,000 m^{2}) Main Campus building provides primary and specialty care in a single location, an outpatient surgery center, and an urgent care center.

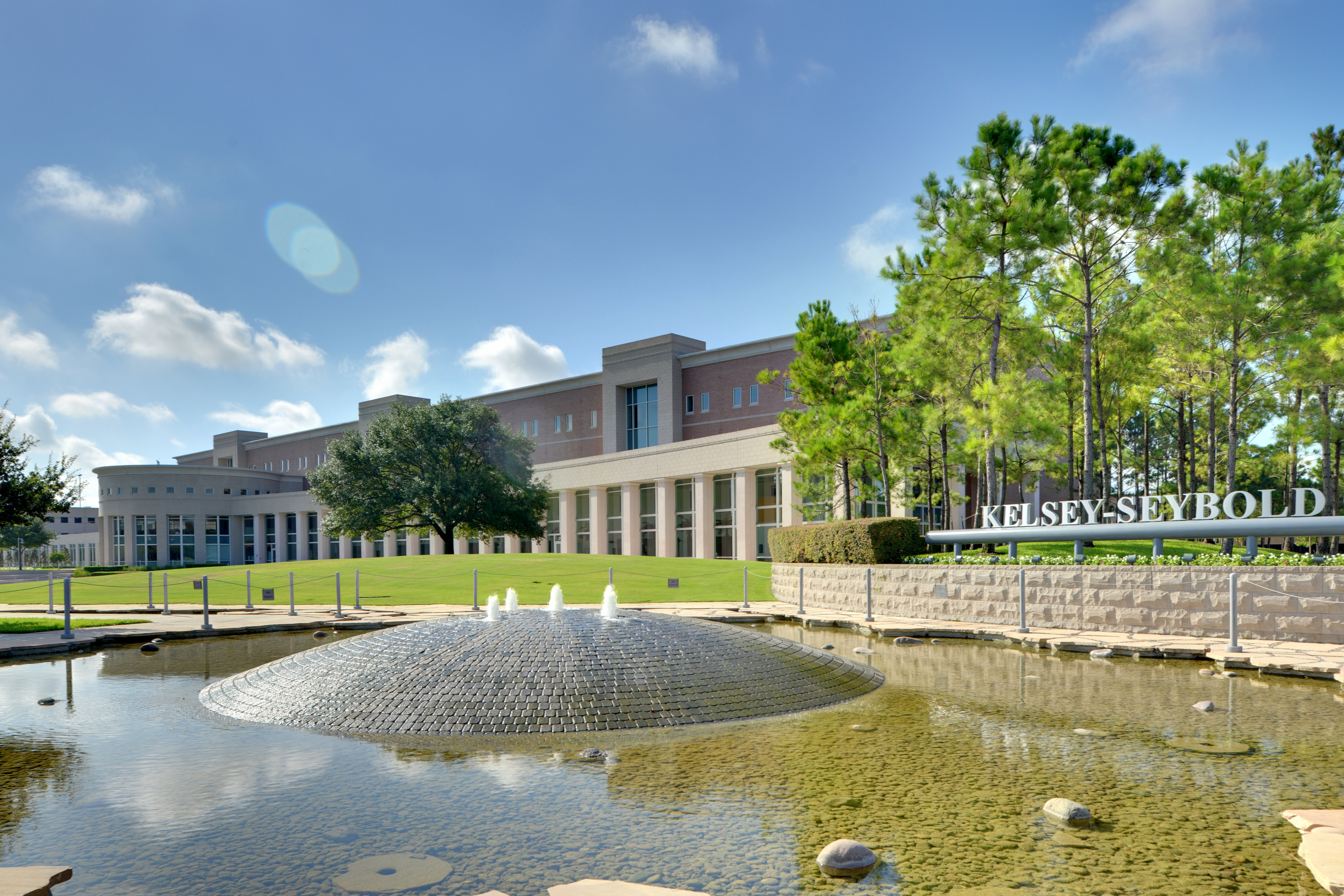
Kelsey-Seybold Clinic, Main Campus at 2727 W. Holcombe Avenue, Houston

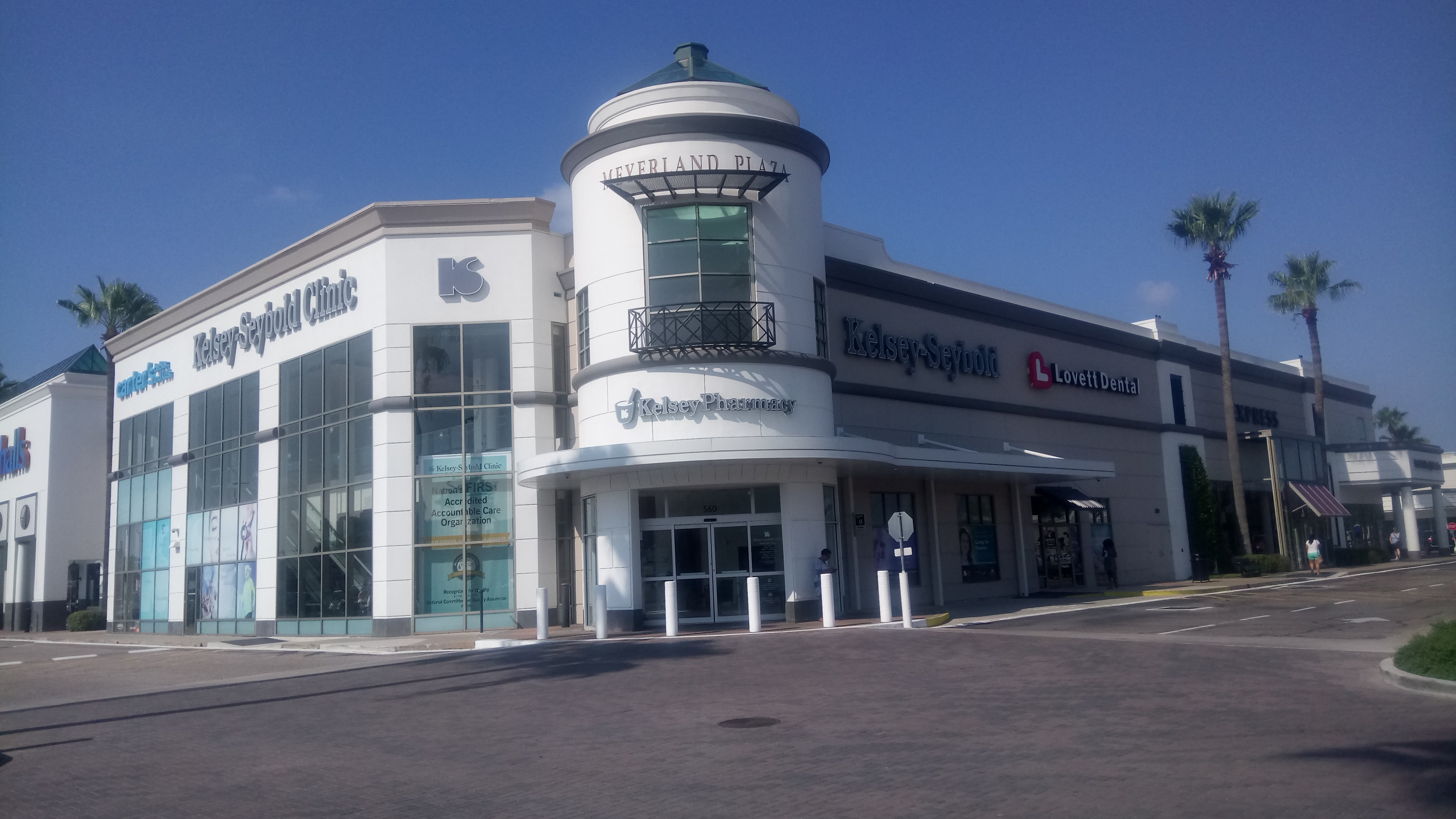
Meyerland Plaza Clinic

== Headquarters ==
The headquarters is located in a four-story, 170,000-square-foot (16,000 m^{2}) building at the intersection of Shadow Creek Parkway and Kirby Drive in Shadow Creek Ranch, Pearland.

Previously the headquarters were in Houston. Matt Buchanan, the president of the Pearland Economic Development Corp. (PEDC), stated that the PEDC and the City of Pearland spent four years to convince Kelsey-Seybold to increase its Pearland operations. In 2011 Kelsey-Seybold announced plans to establish a new Pearland headquarters. Nicholas Ro, the organization's vice president of legal and strategic affairs, stated that the nearby shopping, the area school districts, and the locations of many employees on the southside were reasons why the organization selected Pearland as a site for the new headquarters. At the time many employees of the central office lived in communities such as the Texas Medical Center area, Fort Bend County, and Clear Lake.

The headquarters had a cost of $36 million, including the costs for equipment, construction, and fees. Construction began in May 2012. The construction was scheduled to be completed in June 2013. The first group of employees were scheduled to move in the third week of July of that year.
