= Willowridge High School (Houston) =

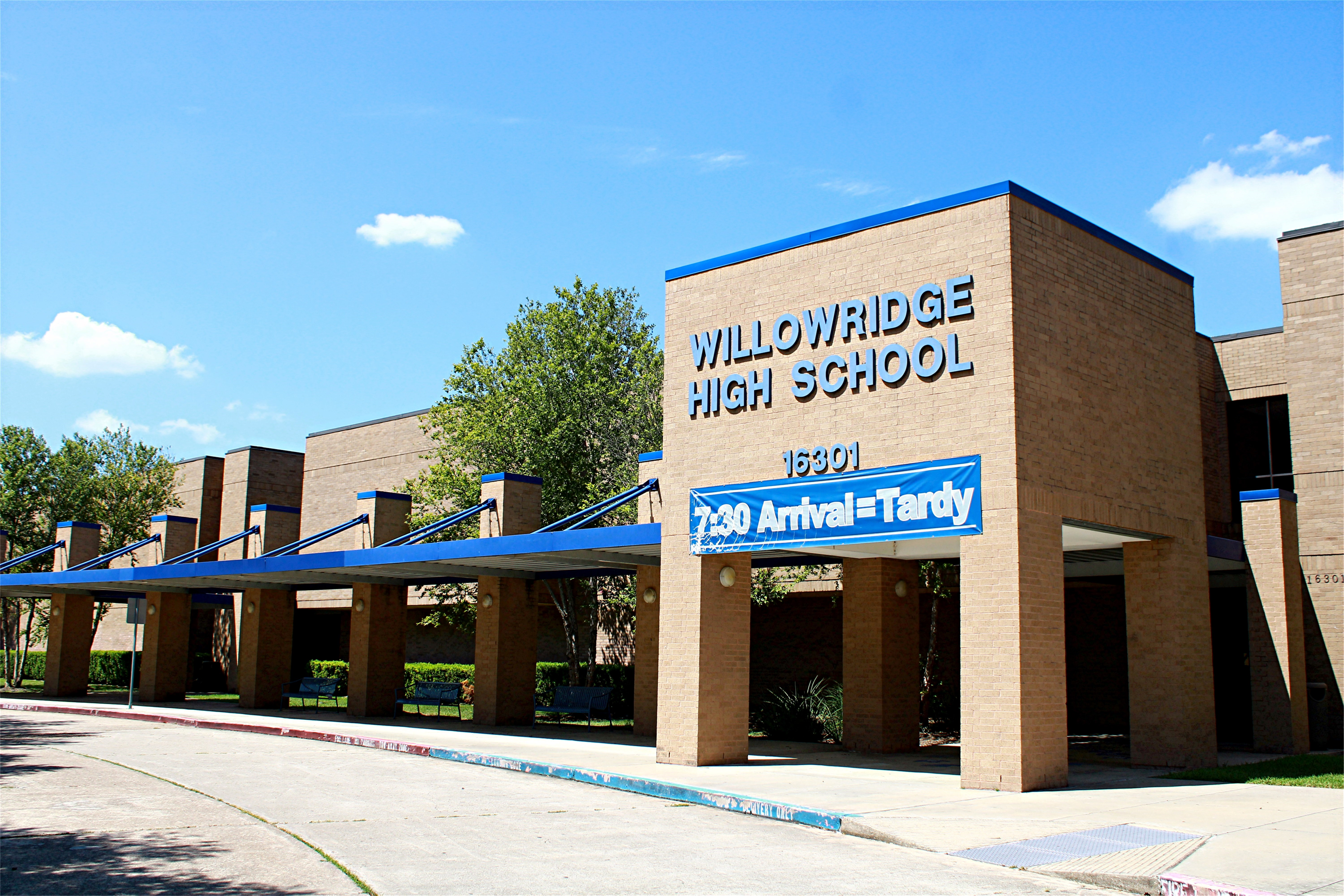

Location
- 16301 Chimney Rock Road; Houston, Fort Bend County, Texas 77053; United States; 29.585772°N 95.482586°W

Information
- Type: Public high school
- Opened: September 1979
- School district: Fort Bend Independent School District
- NCES District ID: 4819650
- Superintendent: Marc Smith
- CEEB code: 446712
- NCES School ID: 481965005468
- Principal: Jennifer Roberts
- Teaching staff: 92.98 (FTE)
- Grades: 9-12
- Enrollment: 1,242 (2024-2025)
- Student to teacher ratio: 13.36
- Colors: Blue and silver
- Slogan: "Eagle Pride Never Dies"
- Athletics conference: UIL Class AAAA
- Mascot: Eagle
- Rival: Thurgood Marshall High School (Texas)
- Feeder schools: McAuliffe Middle School
- 2011 TEA Rating: Academically Acceptable
- Magazine: The Talon
- Magnet programs: P-TECH Computer Science and cybersecurity
- Website: whs.fortbendisd.gov

Willowridge High School is a public high school in Houston, Texas, United States. It is part of the Fort Bend Independent School District. Willowridge serves grades 9 through 12.

The school serves many areas of east Fort Bend County east and north of FM 2234, and a section of Houston inside Fort Bend County, including the neighborhoods of Briargate, Chasewood, Willow Park II, Mayfair Park, Ridgemont, Ridgegate, and Briar Villa. The school also serves the Fort Bend County portion of Shadow Creek Ranch, a community within the city of Pearland.

== History ==
The first phase of Willowridge started in February 1978 and was occupied in September 1979. It was the second (racially integrated) high school opened in FBISD.

In the 1980s, the school was known for its successful football program. During the 82-83 season, NFL Hall of Famer Thurman Thomas led the football team to the Texas Class 4A state championship. This era also produced other NFL players, such as O. J. Brigance, Charles Arbuckle, Allen Aldridge, Selwyn Jones and Stanley Petry.

From 1999 to 2001, the men's basketball team compiled a 75–1 win–loss record (including a 62-game winning streak), earning a pair of Texas Class 5A state titles.

One of the streets on the WHS campus was named in memory of Edgar Glover, Jr., who served as principal between November 1982 until his death in April 1993. Coincidentally, an elementary school named in Edgar Glover, Jr's honor opened on August 17, 1994.

The second phase of Willowridge High School was completed in summer 1992 and dedicated on September 23, 1992. During the expansion, the Ronald McNair Auditorium was dedicated in memoriam (the middle school next to Willowridge was named after Christa McAuliffe).

In 2017 the school temporarily closed due to a mold contamination.

== Campus ==
Circa 2018 Jay Shells, a New York City graphic designer, installed a sign at the school entrance referring to a Z-Ro rap song which mentions the school. The sign was made as a dedication to Houston rap culture.

== Academics ==
Willowridge High School is home to Fort Bend ISD’s Pathways in Technology Early College High School (P-TECH) Program in Computer Science. This dual-enrollment program is conducted in partnership with Houston City College. Students enrolled in the P-TECH program simultaneously work toward their high school diploma along with an associates degree in web development or a Level 2 certificate in cybersecurity.

The school offers a selection of Advanced Placement (AP) courses including AP African American Studies, AP Physics 1, AP Mexican American studies and more. These courses allow students to pursue college-level studies and potentially earn college credit through successful performance on the AP examinations.

Willowridge High School operates on an eight-period schedule.

== Extracurricular programs ==
The school is well known for its marching band, known as the "Mighty Eagle Marching Band." Under band directors Ronald Thornton (head), Delcenia Hill, Maurice Ross, Robert Lee, and Robert Jackson, the band performed at the Rose Bowl in 1994 and Orange Bowl in 1996. In 2001, the band participated in the Macy's Thanksgiving Day Parade. In the summer of 2005, the Willowridge Band vacationed in Honolulu, Hawaii, a rarity for high school bands. The band also hosted the Bands of America contest at Rice Stadium on October 1, 2005. They have consecutively won 1st place at the MLK Battle of the Bands and All-American Battle of the Bands.

The school is also renowned for its basketball program. In 2001, the men's team accomplished the rare feat of having two McDonald's All-Americans in Daniel Ewing and T. J. Ford, who went on to play for Duke University and Texas, respectively.

== Feeder patterns ==
The following elementary schools feed into Willowridge:

- Briargate
- Ridgegate
- Ridgemont
- Blue Ridge

The following middle schools feed into Willowridge:

- McAuliffe

== Notable alumni ==
- Allen Aldridge - former NFL football player for the Denver Broncos (Class of 1990)
- Charles Arbuckle - former NFL football player for the Indianapolis Colts (Class of 1986)
- O. J. Brigance - former NFL football player Baltimore Ravens and director of player development; recipient of 2012 Distinguished Alumni Award from Rice University (Class of 1987)
- Eric England - former NFL football player and player for the Toronto Argonauts in the CFL (Class of 1990)
- Daniel Ewing - former NBA basketball player for the Los Angeles Clippers, now player for Maccabi Ashdod of the Israeli Premier League (Class of 2001)
- T. J. Ford - former NBA basketball player for San Antonio Spurs (Class of 2001)
- Albert Johnson III - former NFL & CFL football player for Winnipeg Blue Bombers & Miami Dolphins
- Selwyn Jones - former NFL defensive back for the Seattle Seahawks and Super Bowl champion Denver Broncos in 1998; won championship with high school teammate Allen Aldridge (Class of 1988)
- Ivan McFarlin - former NBA basketball player for the Philadelphia 76ers (Class of 2000)
- Manny Ramirez - offensive lineman for the Denver Broncos (Class of 2002)
- Di Reed - member of early 1990s R&B soul group Jade
- Scarface, real name Brad Terrence Jordan - Houston rapper (attended)
- Ansu Sesay - former NBA basketball player for the Seattle SuperSonics, and Golden State Warriors (Class of 1994)
- Thurman Thomas - former NFL running back for the Buffalo Bills; elected to the Pro Football Hall of Fame in 2007 and into the College Football Hall of Fame in 2008 (Class of 1984)
- Isaiah Washington - actor, known for Romeo Must Die, Wild Things 2, Grey's Anatomy (Class of 1981)
- Jason Webster - former NFL football player for the New England Patriots and Atlanta Falcons (Class of 1996)
- Z-Ro - member of Houston rap group ABN
