= Austin House =

Austin House may refer to:

== Guyana ==
- Austin House (Guyana), official residence of the Anglican Bishop of Guyana

== United States ==
- Hiram B. Austin House, Mon Louis Island, Alabama, listed on the National Register of Historic Places in Mobile County, Alabama
- A. Everett Austin House, Hartford, Connecticut, listed on the NRHP in Hartford County, Connecticut
- Austin House (Sarasota, Florida), listed on the National Register of Historic Places in Manatee County, Florida
- Austin-Hennessey Homestead, Wells, Maine, listed on the National Register of Historic Places in York County, Maine
- Drury-Austin House, Boyds, Maryland, listed on the NRHP in Maryland
- Francis B. Austin House, Boston, Massachusetts, listed on the NRHP in Massachusetts
- Cooper-Frost-Austin House, Cambridge, Massachusetts, listed on the NRHP in Massachusetts
- Austin-McDonald House, Aztec, New Mexico, listed on the National Register of Historic Places listings in San Juan County, New Mexico
- Austin, Nichols and Company Warehouse, Brooklyn, New York, listed on the National Register of Historic Places in Kings County, New York
- Richard Austin House, Ossining, New York, listed on the National Register of Historic Places in Westchester County, New York
- William Austin House (Trumansburg, New York), listed on the NRHP in Tompkins County, New York
- Eliphalet Austin House, Austinburg, Ohio, listed on the NRHP in Ohio
- Austin-Magie Farm and Mill District, Oxford, Ohio, listed on the NRHP in Ohio
- John Alexander Austin House, Memphis, Tennessee, listed on the National Register of Historic Places listings in Shelby County, Tennessee
- Thomas Austin House, Lehi, Utah, listed on the National Register of Historic Places in Utah County, Utah
- William Austin House (Park City, Utah), listed on the National Register of Historic Places in Summit County, Utah

== See also ==
- Austin Hall (disambiguation)
- Austin Building (disambiguation)
- Austin Historic District (disambiguation)
