= Austin Building =

Austin Building may refer to:

- Building 800-Austin Hall, Montgomery, Alabama, listed on the NRHP in Alabama
- Austin Building (Denver, Colorado), listed on the National Register of Historic Places listings in Northeast Denver, Colorado
- Glidden-Austin Block, Newcastle, Maine, listed on the National Register of Historic Places listings in Lincoln County, Maine
- Austin City Hall, Austin, Nevada, listed on the National Register of Historic Places in Nevada
- Austin Masonic and Odd Fellows Hall, Austin, Nevada, listed on the National Register of Historic Places in Nevada
- Austin, Nichols and Company Warehouse, Brooklyn, New York, listed on the National Register of Historic Places in Kings County, New York
- Austin County Jail, Bellville, Texas, listed on the National Register of Historic Places in Austin County, Texas
- Austin Daily Tribune Building, Austin, Texas, listed on the National Register of Historic Places in Travis County, Texas

== See also ==
- Austin Hall (disambiguation)
- Austin House (disambiguation)
- Austin Historic District (disambiguation)
