= William Austin =

William, Bill or Billy Austin may refer to:

== Literary figures ==
- William Austin (English writer) (1587–1634), English author of miscellany
- William Austin (poet) (before 1634–after 1666), English classical scholar
- William Austin (physician) (1754–1793), English medical doctor and author
- William Austin (American writer) (1778–1841), American author and lawyer
- William James Austin (1949–2019), American poet inspired by New York City
- William D. Austin (1856–1944), American architect and author

== Politicians ==
- William J. Austin (1822–1904), American miller, farmer and politician
- William H. Austin (1859–1922), American lawyer and politician

== Sportspeople ==
- William Austin (cricketer) (1801–?), English first-class player
- Billy Austin (footballer) (1900–1979), English outside-right; played as Sam Austin
- Bill Austin (American football, born 1928) (1928–2013), American player and coach
- Bill Austin (American football, born 1937) (c. 1937–2015), American player with Rutgers Scarlet Knights
- Billy Austin (American football) (born 1975), American player with Indianapolis Colts

== Others ==
- William Austin (actor) (1884–1975), British character performer
- William Austin (film editor) (1903–1993), American film and TV editor
- William Austin (caricaturist) (1721–1820), English drawing master and engraver
- William Austin (bishop) (1807–1892), English-born Anglican bishop of Guyana
- William F. Austin (born 1942), American billionaire, CEO of Starkey Hearing Technologies, the largest hearing aid manufacturer in the US
- William G. Austin (1868–1929), American Army officer and Medal of Honor recipient
- William Weaver Austin (1920–2000), American musicologist, organist, and pianist

== See also ==
- William Austin House (disambiguation)
