= William Austin House =

William Austin House may refer to:

- William Austin House (Trumansburg, New York), listed on the NRHP in Tompkins County, New York
- William Austin House (Park City, Utah), listed on the National Register of Historic Places in Summit County, Utah
