= Austin City Hall =

Austin City Hall may refer to:

- Austin City Hall (Austin, Nevada)
- Austin City Hall (Austin, Texas)
