= Austin Hall =

Austin Hall may refer to:

== People ==
- Austin Hall (writer) (1885–1933), science fiction, fantasy and western writer

== Buildings ==
=== United States ===
- Building 800–Austin Hall, Montgomery, Alabama
- Austin Town Hall, Chicago, Illinois
- Austin Hall (Harvard University), Cambridge, Massachusetts
- Austin City Hall (Austin, Nevada)
- Austin Masonic and Odd Fellows Hall, Austin, Nevada
- Austin Hall, Strafford, New Hampshire
- Austin Scott Hall (Rutgers), New Brunswick, New Jersey
- Austin Hall (Ohio Wesleyan University), Delaware, Ohio
- Austin Hall (Oregon State University), Corvallis, Oregon
- Austin City Hall (Austin, Texas)
- Austin Hall (Huntsville, Texas), listed on the National Register of Historic Places
