= Hermon Camp House =

Historic house in New York, United States

- U.S. National Register of Historic Places
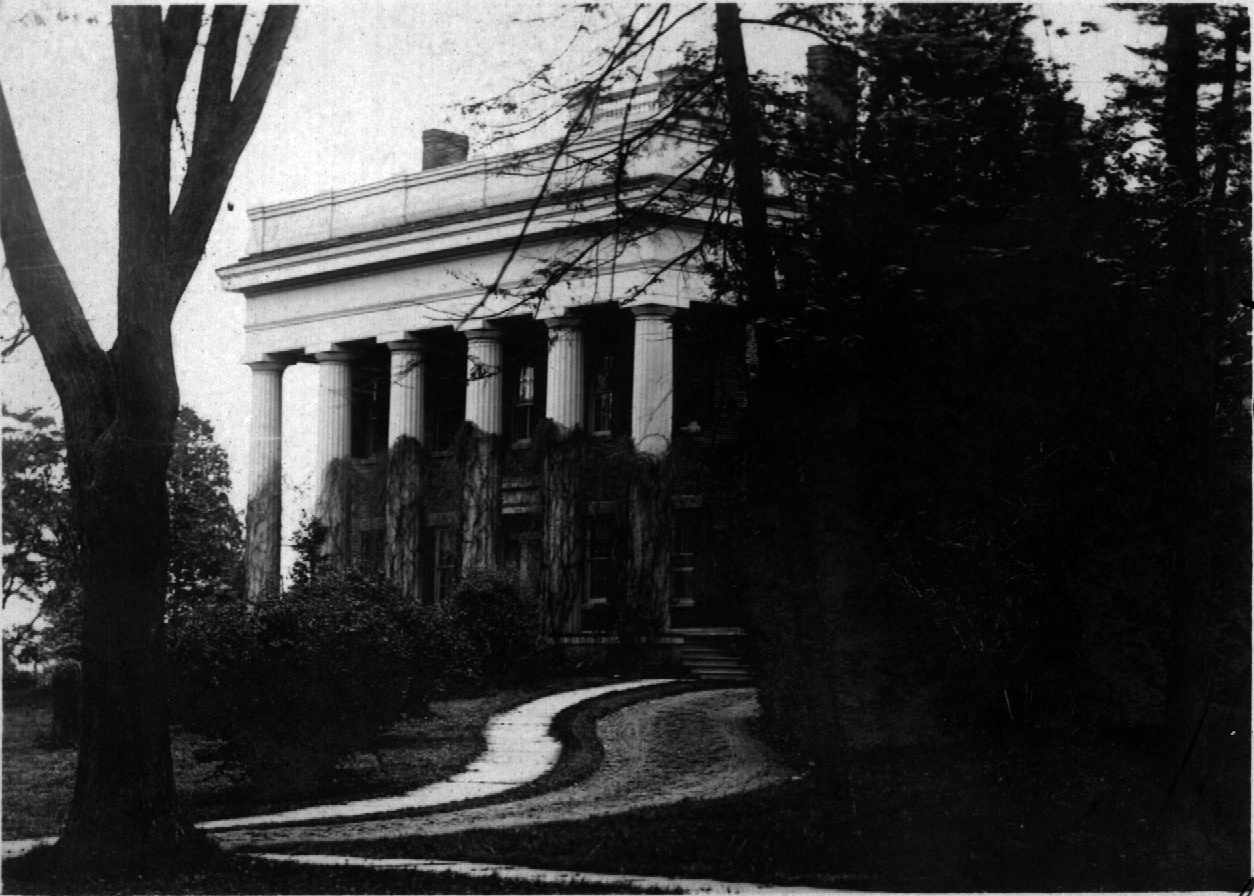
- Hermon Camp House, ca. 1900

- Location within New York Location within the United States
- Location: Camp St., Trumansburg, New York
- Coordinates: 42°32′19″N 76°39′42″W
- Area: 4.5 acres (1.8 ha)
- Built: 1845
- Architect: Judd, Thomas
- Architectural style: Greek Revival
- NRHP reference No.: 73001279
- Added to NRHP: December 04, 1973

Hermon Camp House is a historic home located at Trumansburg in Tompkins County, New York. It was built in 1845-1847 and consists of a two-story central block flanked by two slightly lower wings in the Greek Revival style. The main block is dominated by a full-height portico with six fluted Doric order columns supporting full entablature and parapet. Attached to the west wing of the main block is a carriage house.

It was listed on the National Register of Historic Places in 1973.

The house is privately owned and used as a residence, and so is not open to the public. The owners occasionally open it for local charity and political events.
