= Second Baptist Society of Ulysses =

Historic church in New York, United States

- U.S. National Register of Historic Places
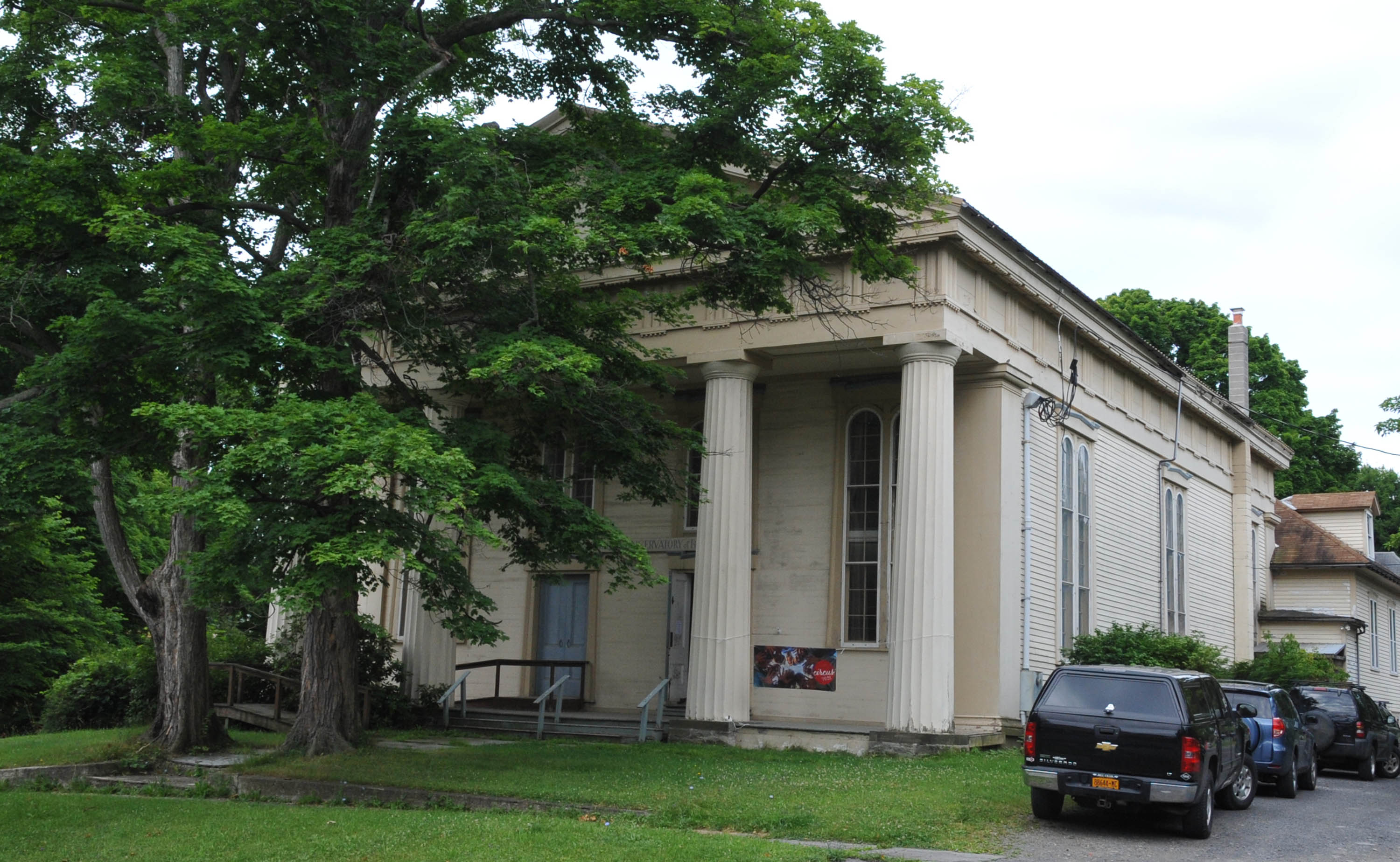

- Location within New York Location within the United States
- Location: 1 Congress St., Trumansburg, New York
- Coordinates: 42°32′35″N 76°39′45″W
- Area: less than one acre
- Built: 1849
- Architect: Elmore, Daniel; Holton, Eugene
- Architectural style: Greek Revival
- NRHP reference No.: 01001381
- Added to NRHP: December 28, 2001

Second Baptist Society of Ulysses, now known as Trumansburg Conservatory for the Arts, is a historic Baptist church located at Trumansburg in Tompkins County, New York. The building has a rectangular footprint comprising a front gable main block, built between 1849 and 1851, with a later frame addition with a hipped roof completed about 1902. It measures 54.5 feet wide by 85 feet deep, with an additional 10 feet for the porch, or verandah. The porch is supported by four fluted Doric order columns in the Greek Revival style. The church was sold to the Trumansburg Conservatory for the Arts in 1982.

It was listed on the National Register of Historic Places in 2001.
