= William Austin (poet) =

English writer of verse and classical scholar

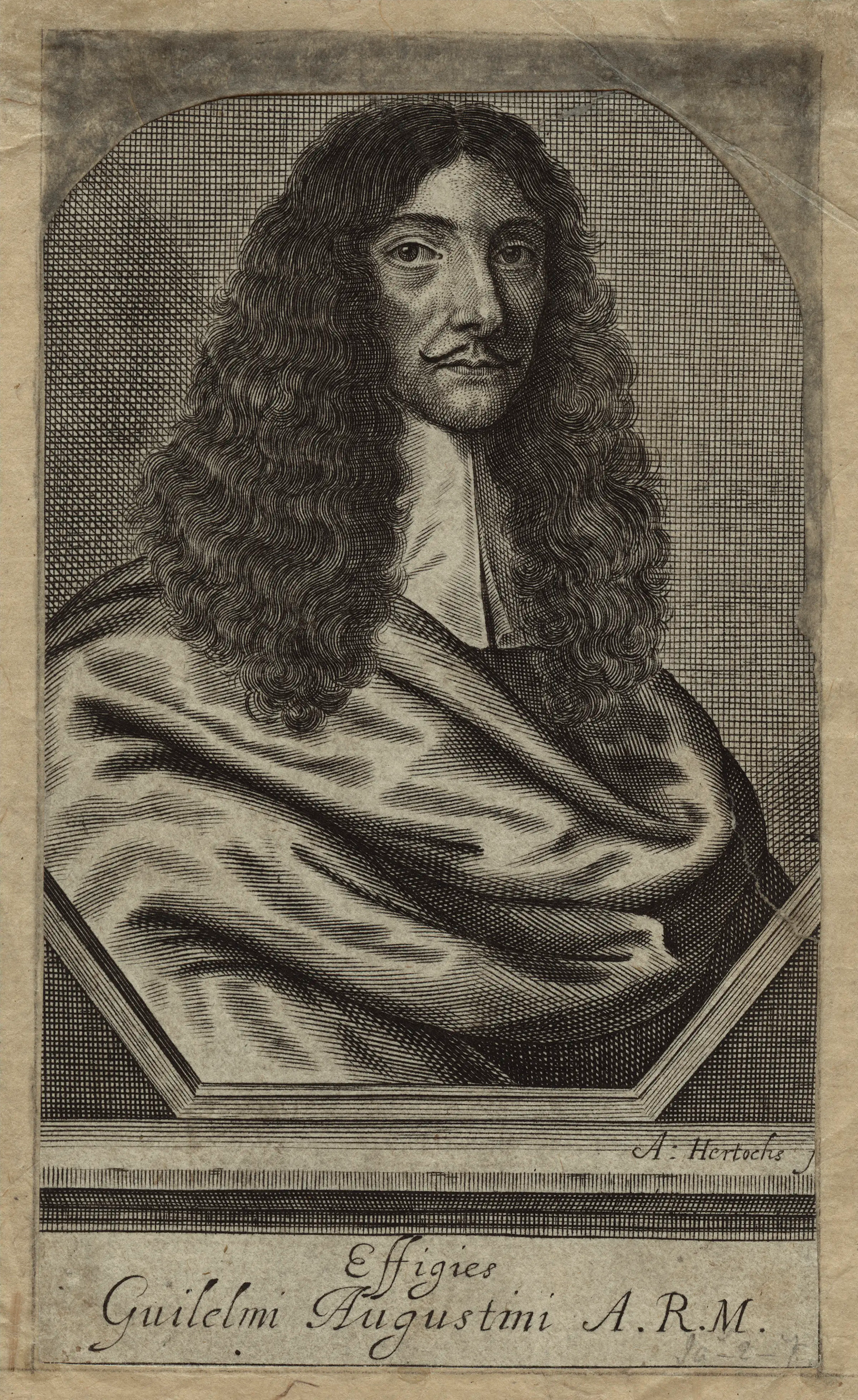
Engraving by Abraham Hertochs, published 1666

William Austin (fl. 1662), was an English writer of verse and classical scholar.

== Life ==
He was the son of William Austin, the religious writer, and was a barrister of Gray's Inn, London.

== Poems on the wedding of Charles II ==
On the marriage of Charles II with Catherine of Braganza, Austin wrote two poems to celebrate the union, which were "presented to their majesties" on their passage down the Thames from Hampton Court to Whitehall (23 Aug. 1662). The first was entitled A Joyous Welcome to the most Serene and most Illustrious Queen of Brides, Catherine the Royal Spouse and Consort of Charles II (London, 1662 folio), and the second Triumphus Hymenæus, London's solemn Jubilee for the most auspicious Nuptials of their great Sovereign, Charles the Second (London, 1662, folio).

Both poems were elaborately printed, and are now highly prized as bibliographical rarities. They are full of bombastic eulogy, and are crowded with classical allusions, explained in voluminous and learned notes. In an address to the reader Austin not inaptly refers to his work as "this thatcht Tugurium of Poesie."

== Atlas under Olympus ==
In 1664 he produced a doggerel poem of similar calibre, bearing the title of Atlas under Olympus. An Heroick Poem by William Austin, of Gray's Inn, Esq. London, printed for the author, 1664 (8vo). It was dedicated to Charles II and George Monck, 1st Duke of Albemarle, and was a fulsome panegyric upon their achievements. Almost every line is based on a classical quotation, which is printed in each case at the foot of the page.

== Anatomy of the Pestilence ==
Austin's most readable production is a prosaic description in verse of the Great Plague of London. Its title runs: Ἑπιλοωα επη or the Anatomy of the Pestilence. A Poem in three parts, describing the deplorable condition of the city of London under its merciless dominion, 1665. What the Plague is, together with the causes of it. As also, the Prognosticks and most eftectual meanes of safety both preservative and curative. By William Austin, of Grayes Inne, Esq." (London, 1666, 8vo.) In an address to the reader it is stated that the poem was written at the request of "very worthy persons in the countrey at the time of the sickness when the mortality in London" reached "seven or eight thousand a week with some hundreds over and above." Although Austin here dispenses with classical allusions and annotations, he employs a number of Latin and Greek words in a slightly anglicised form. A portrait of the author is prefixed to the volume.

== Death ==
Austin was buried in the parish church of Southwark, near the monument of his father, but the year of his death is uncertain.
