= First Presbyterian Church of Ulysses =

Historic church in New York, United States

- U.S. National Register of Historic Places
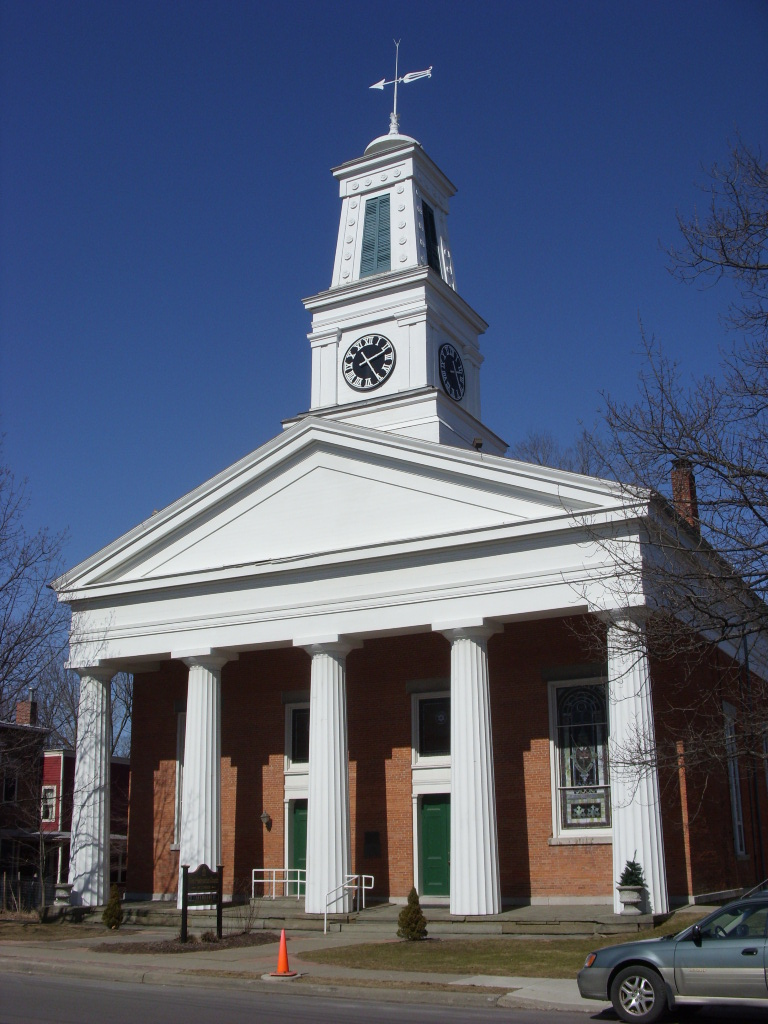
- First Presbyterian Church of Ulysses, March 2009

- Location within New York Location within the United States
- Location: Main St., Trumansburg, New York
- Coordinates: 42°32′29″N 76°39′34″W
- Area: 1.1 acres (0.45 ha)
- Built: 1849
- Architectural style: Greek Revival
- NRHP reference No.: 99000669
- Added to NRHP: June 03, 1999

First Presbyterian Church of Ulysses is a historic Presbyterian church located at Trumansburg in Tompkins County, New York. It is an imposing temple front Greek Revival style structure built in 1849–1850. The church is a 61 feet by 57 feet, gable roofed brick structure that is dominated by a monumental, pedimented portico supported by five massive, fluted Doric order columns. A tripartite bell tower crowns the roof ridge.

It was listed on the National Register of Historic Places in 1999.

== Gallery ==
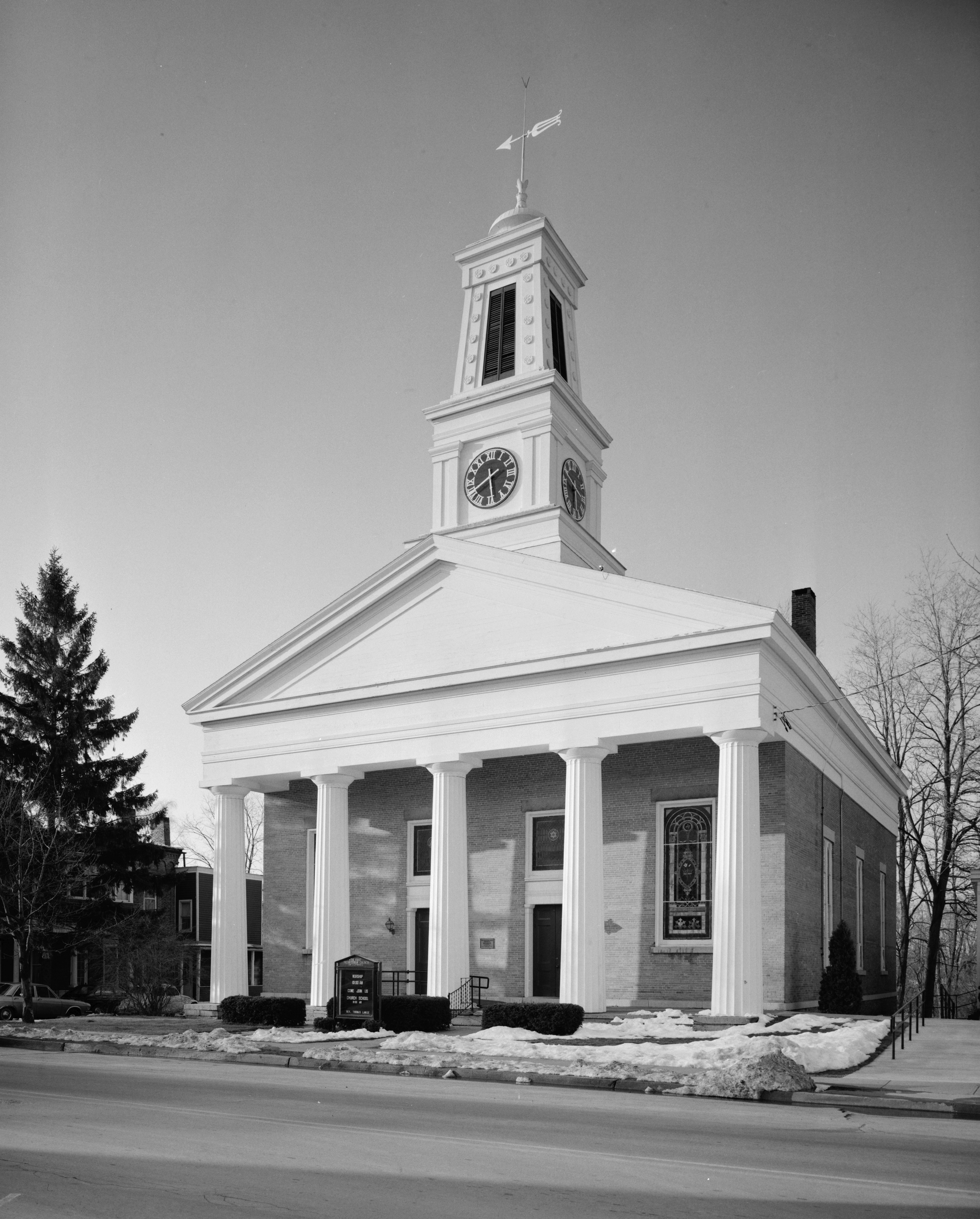
First Presbyterian Church of Ulysses, April 1983

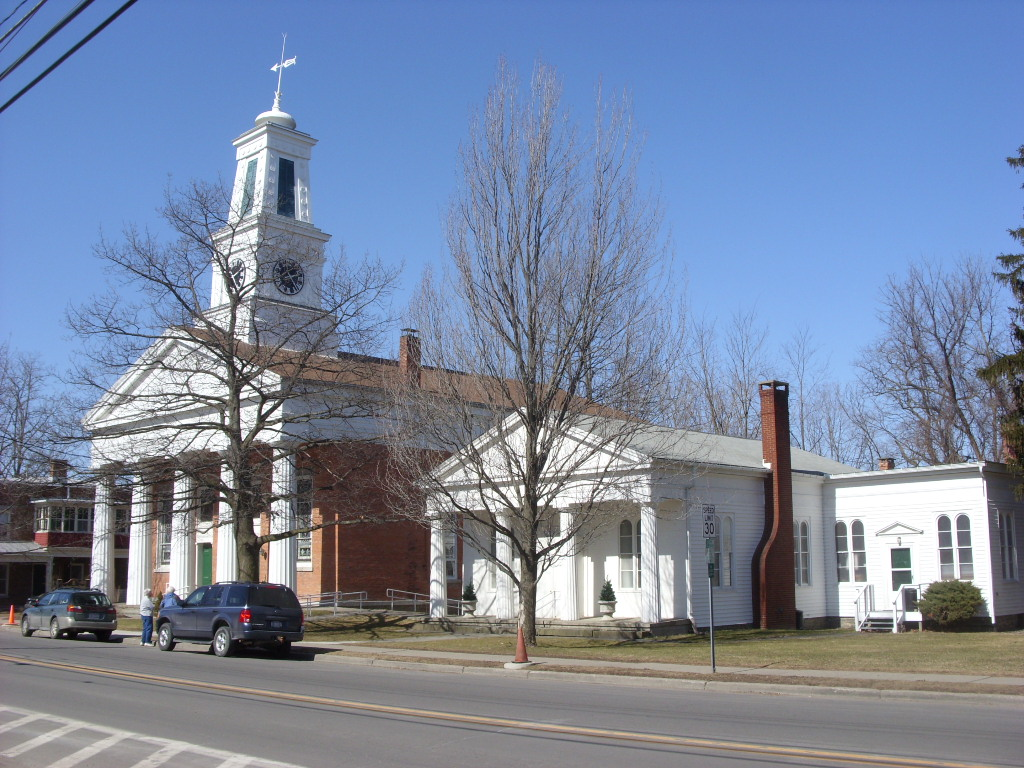

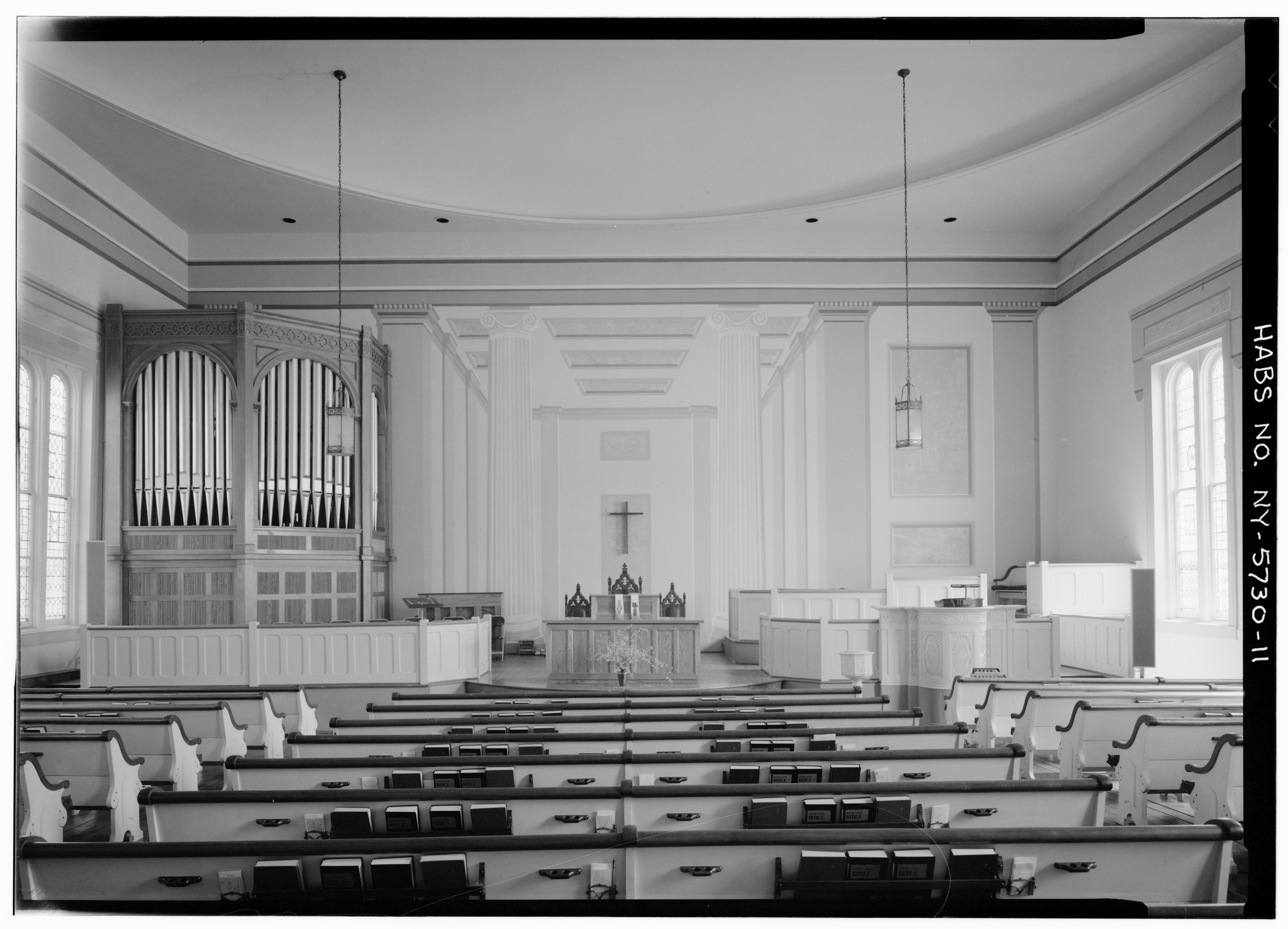
Interior of the church

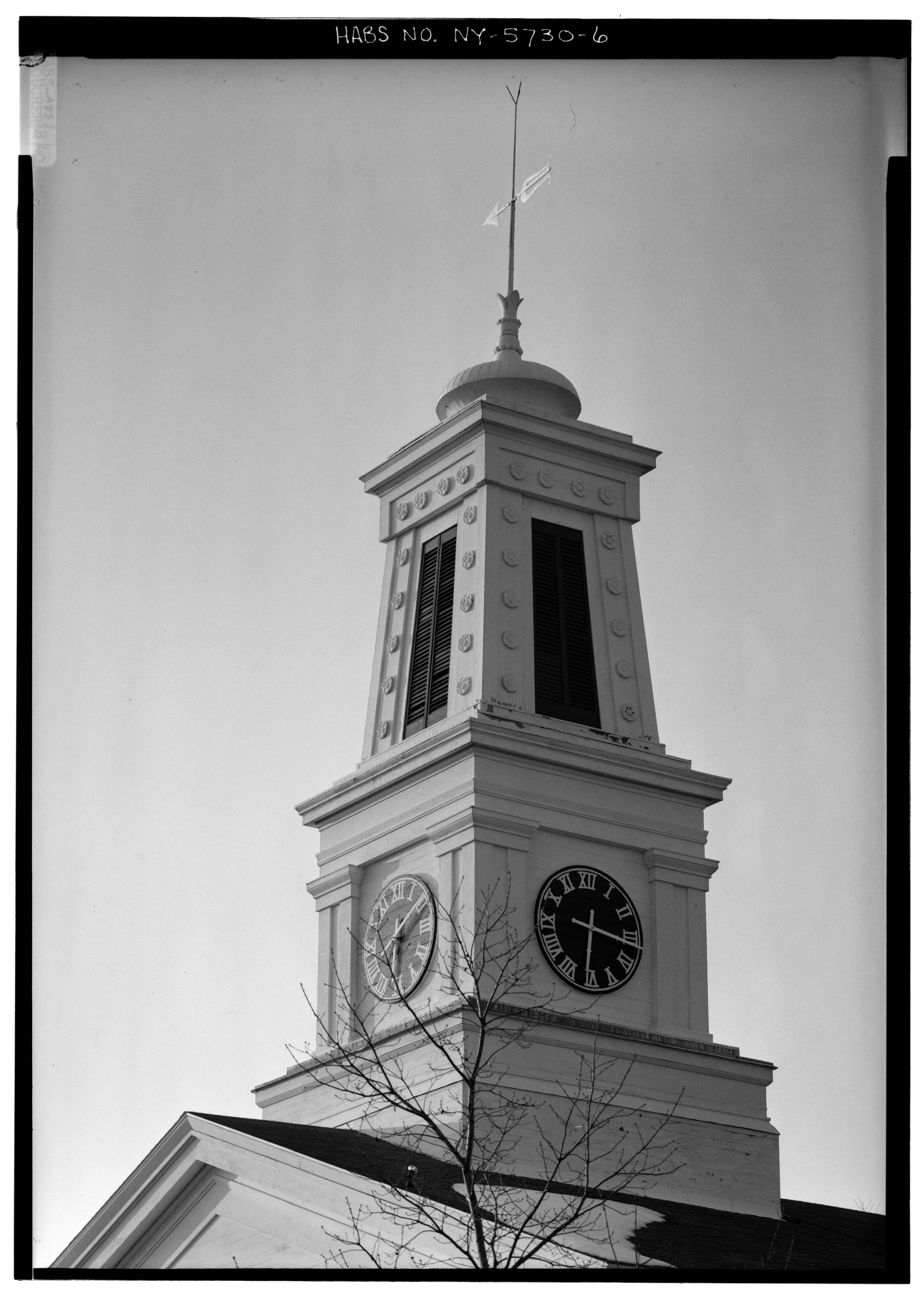
Detail of the steeple
