= Trumansburg, New York =

- Village
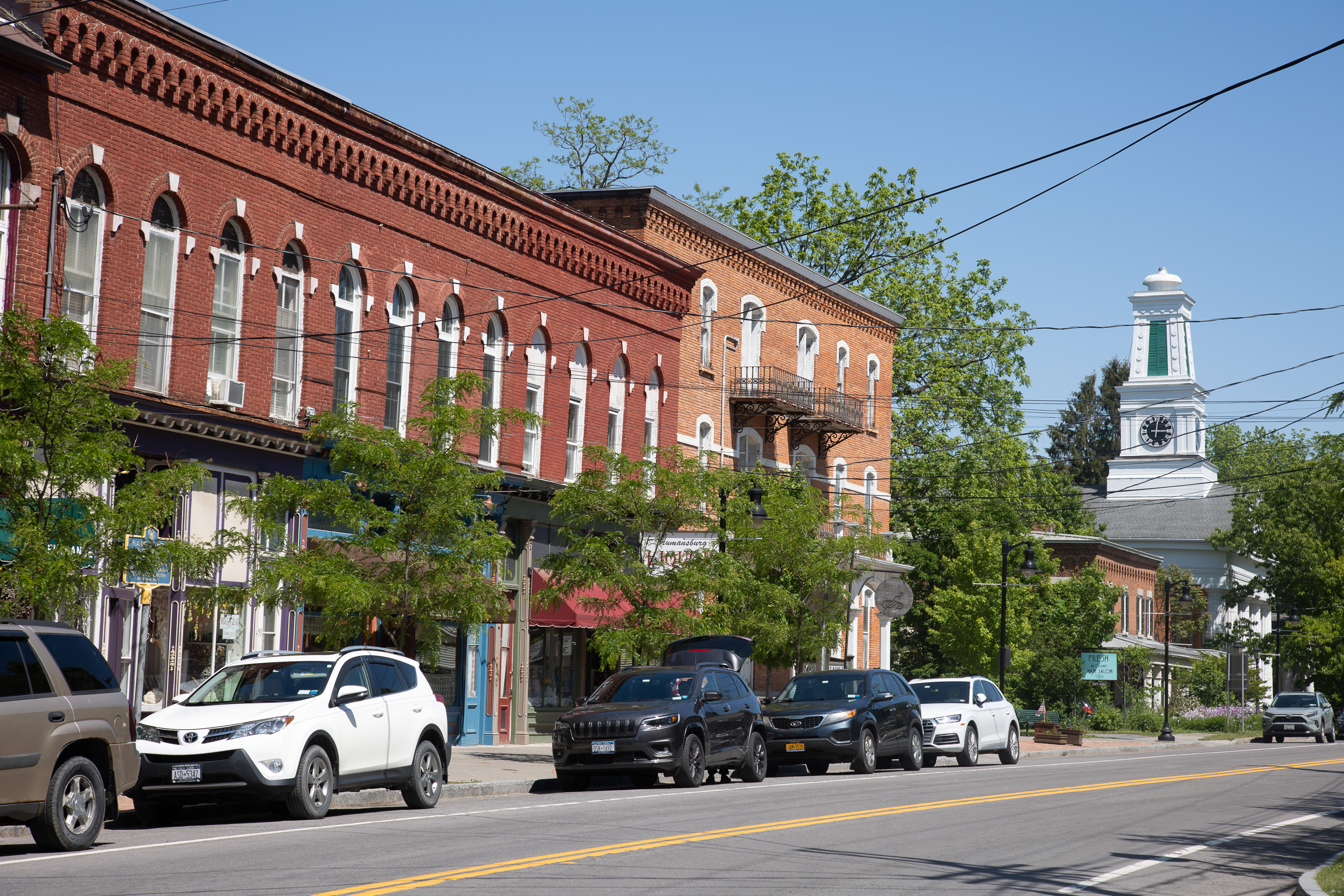
- Trumansburg's Main Street

- Location in the state of New York
- Coordinates: 42°32′26″N 76°39′36″W
- Country: United States
- State: New York
- County: Tompkins
- Settled: 1793
- Incorporated: 1872
- Named for: Early settler

Area
  - Total: 1.39 sq mi (3.60 km^{2})
  - Land: 1.39 sq mi (3.59 km^{2})
  - Water: 0.0039 sq mi (0.01 km^{2})
- Elevation: 965 ft (294 m)

Population (2020)
  - Total: 1,714
  - Density: 1,235.6/sq mi (477.06/km^{2})
- Time zone: UTC-5 (Eastern (EST))
  - Summer (DST): UTC-4 (EDT)
- ZIP code: 14886
- Area code: 607
- FIPS code: 36-75506
- GNIS feature ID: 0974069
- Website: www.trumansburg-ny.gov

Trumansburg is a village in Tompkins County, New York, United States. The population was 1,714 at the 2020 census. The name incorporates a misspelling of the surname of the founder, Abner Treman. The Tremans spelled their surname several different ways; "Truman", however, was not one of them. The village's application for a post office established the present spelling. The village is located within the town of Ulysses and is northwest of Ithaca, New York.

== History ==
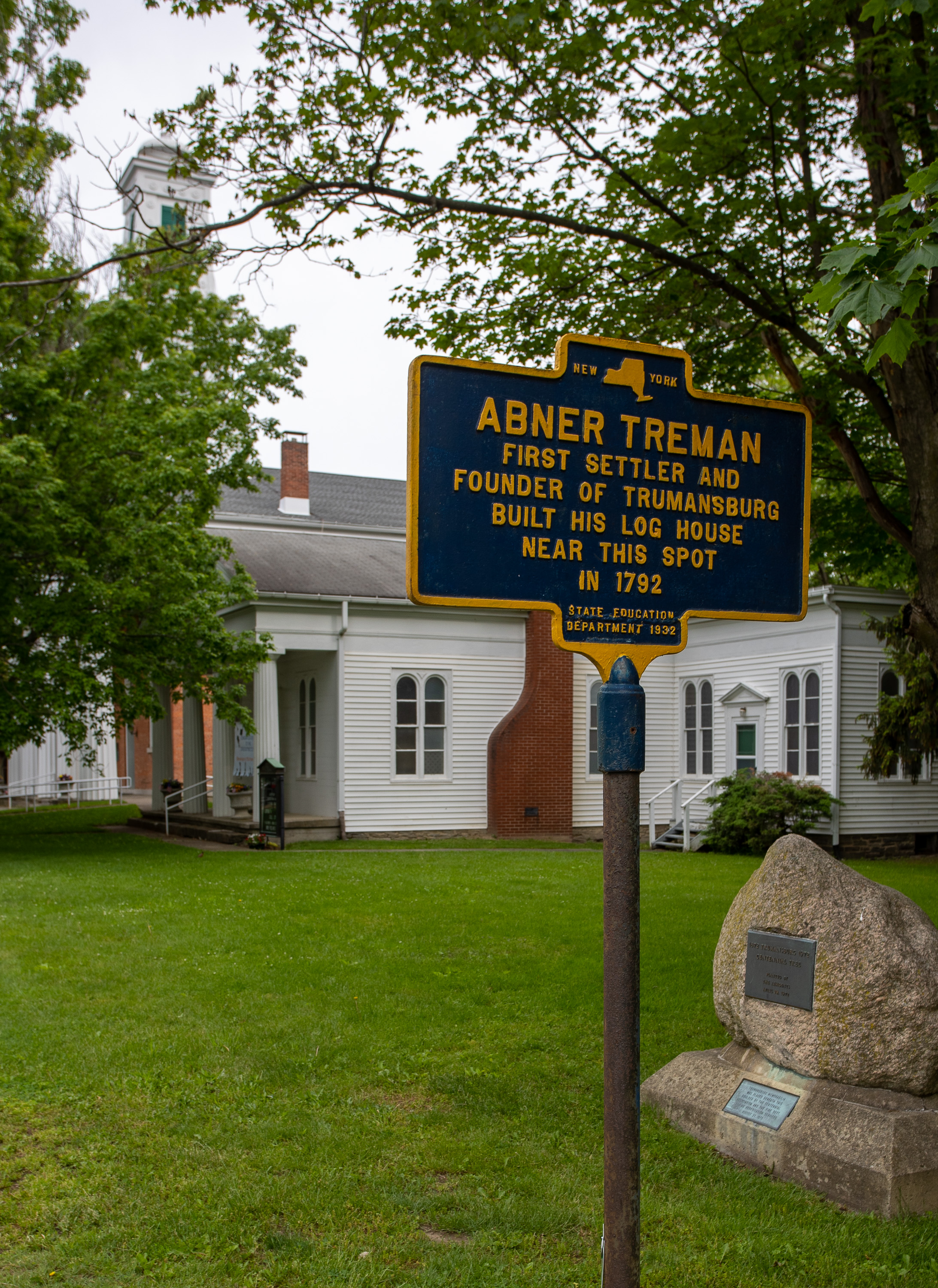
Abner Treman historic marker

The village was incorporated in 1872, in the former Central New York Military Tract. The village was originally named "Tremaine's Village", after an early settler, Abner Tremaine (Tremain, Treman), who was granted the land for his service in the American Revolutionary War. The village was built around a cascade on the creek that provided power for grain mills.

In the 19th century Trumansburg was dominated by Col. Hermon Camp, an officer in the War of 1812 who settled in what was to become the village. For many years he was the local postmaster, and founded a bank, now the Tompkins Trust Company, the largest bank in the county. His imposing and elegant Greek Revival style house remains the largest in the village. The Hermon Camp House was listed on the National Register of Historic Places in 1973. Also listed on the National Register of Historic Places are the First Presbyterian Church of Ulysses, William Austin House, Indian Fort Road Site, and Second Baptist Society of Ulysses.

In the latter half of the 20th century, as the quality of the road between Trumansburg and Ithaca improved and "country living" became more fashionable, the village became home to many faculty and staff at nearby Cornell University and Ithaca College, as well as many musicians. Between 1961 and 1970, Robert Moog built electronic music equipment including Theremins and his famous synthesizers in a downtown storefront.

From 2004 to 2007, the mayor was John R. Levine, the original author of The Internet for Dummies.

== Village life ==
Trumansburg

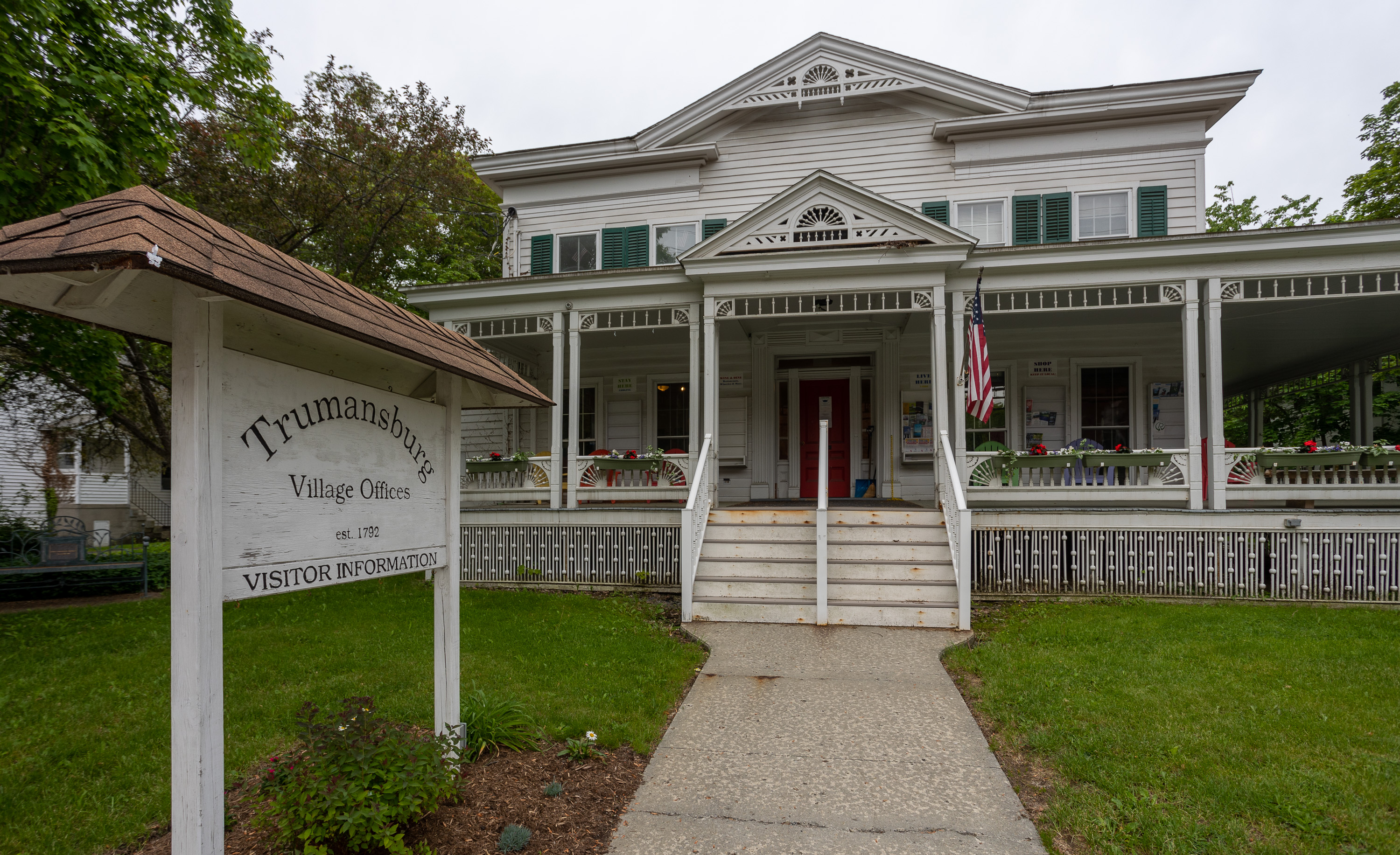
Village offices

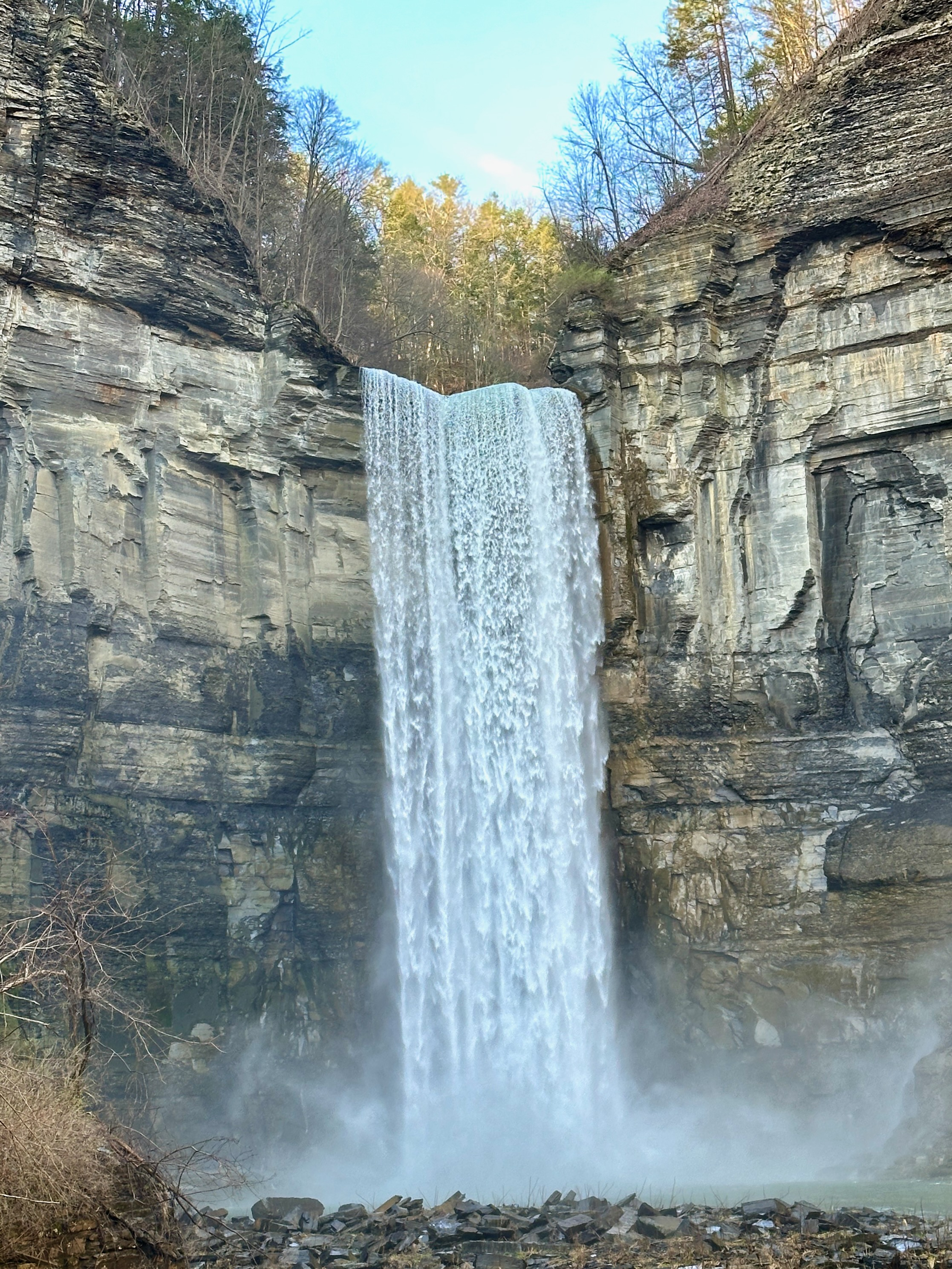
Taughannock Falls

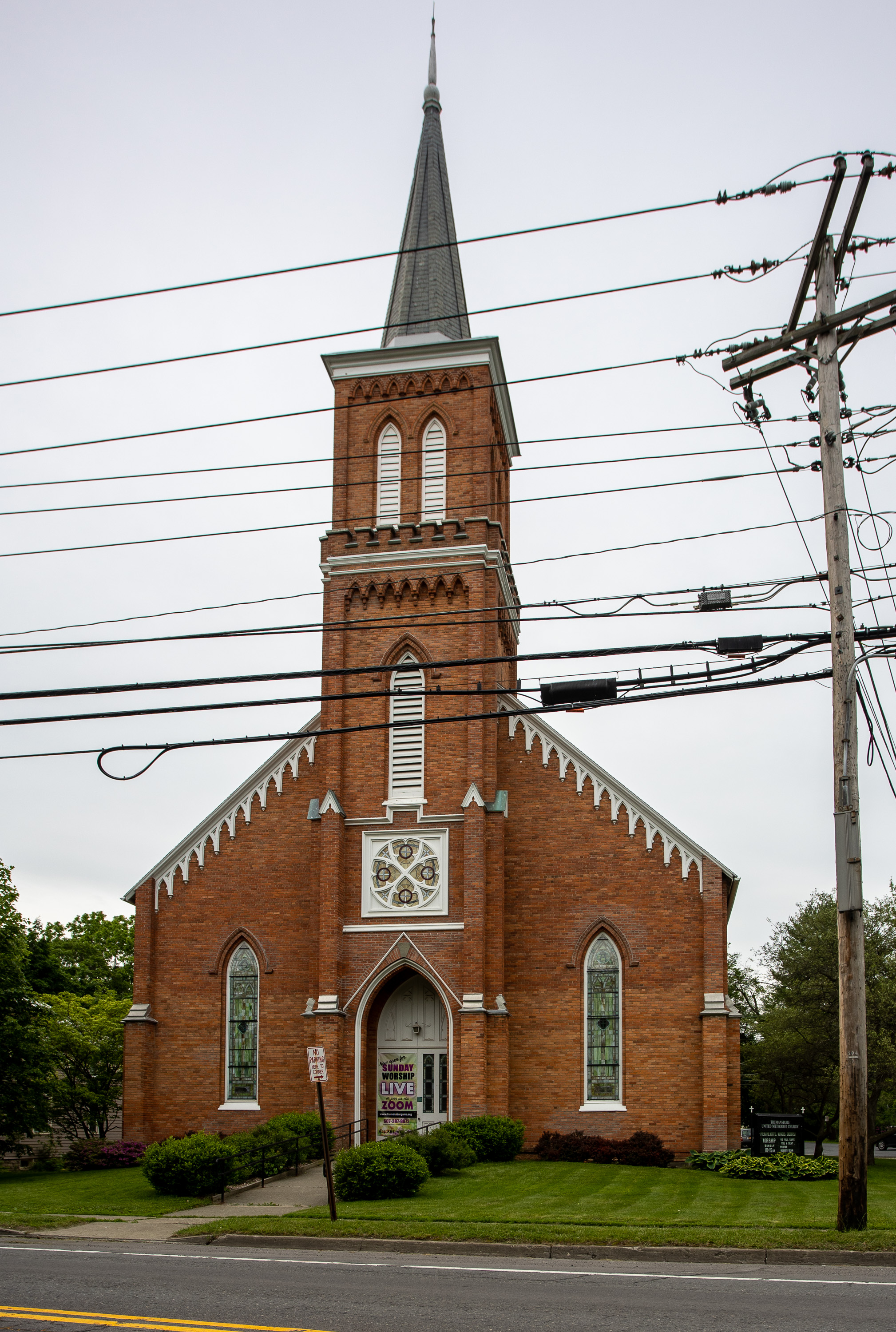
United Methodist Church

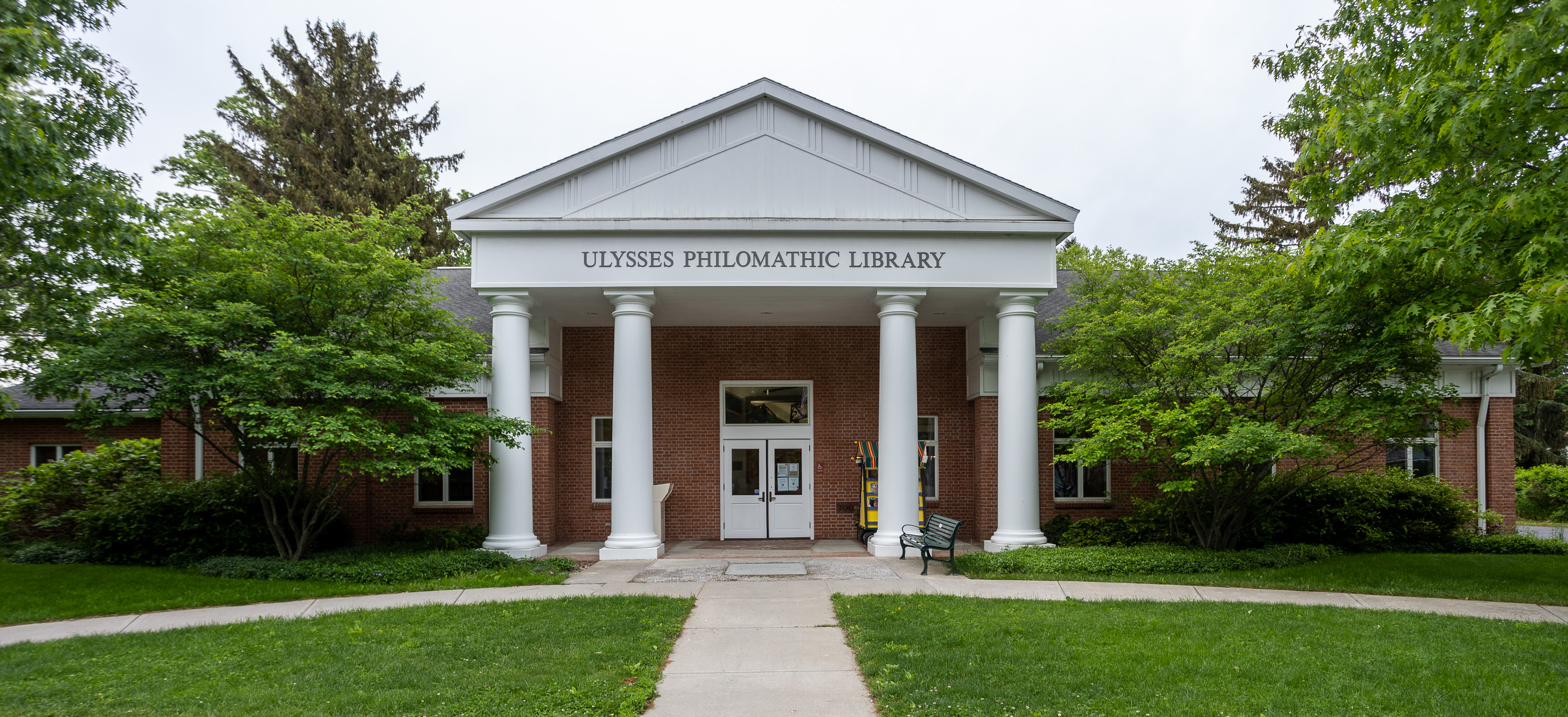
Ulysses Philomathic Library

Trumansburg was a milltown and commercial center for the agricultural community from its inception until the Second World War. Since the late 1940s it has become a combination of a bedroom suburb for Ithaca and a modest tourist destination, with restaurants and antique stores. Since 1991, the Finger Lakes GrassRoots Festival of Music and Dance has taken place each July at the village fairgrounds and is hosted by nationally popular Trumansburg-based band Donna the Buffalo. From 1973 to 2016, the Rongovian Embassy to the USA ("the Rongo") was a regional center for live music. The village is also located along the Cayuga Wine Trail and is close to Taughannock Falls.

Other cultural resources include the Ulysses Philomathic Library, a member of the Finger Lakes Library System, the Trumansburg Conservatory of Fine Arts, which offers concerts and music lessons, and the Ulysses Historical Society Museum, with collections of local historical material.

Baptist, Catholic, Episcopalian, Methodist, and Presbyterian churches are located within the village, with a Baptist church and a meetinghouse of the LDS Church located just outside the village limits.

The Trumansburg Central School District consists of the Elementary School, Russel I. Doig Middle School, and Charles O. Dickerson High School, all of which share a campus at 100 Whig Street. School and local athletic teams use the nickname the Blue Raiders. The Trumansburg Central School District Foundation provides financial support for local educational programs.

== Geography ==
Trumansburg is located at 42°32′26″N 76°39′36″W (42.540447, -76.660121). According to the United States Census Bureau, the village has a total area of 1.2 square miles (3.1 km^{2}), of which, 1.2 square miles (3.1 km^{2}) of it is land and 0.83% is water. The village is located on the Trumansburg Creek (also known as Frontenac Creek) which arises on the ridge west of the village and empties into Cayuga Lake at Frontenac Point. Trumansburg is in the northern part of Tompkins County with its northern boundary bordering Seneca County. It is approximately 12 miles north of Ithaca, New York on the west side of Cayuga Lake. The scenic Taughannock Falls State Park, featuring one of the highest waterfalls east of the Rocky Mountains, is located just southeast of the village at the edge of Cayuga Lake.

=== Climate ===
Trumansburg has cold, snowy winters and enjoys warm, pleasant summers. The average annual temperature is 48 °F (9 °C), and the average annual precipitation is 36 inches (910 mm).

Climate data for Trumansburg, New York
Month	Jan	Feb	Mar	Apr	May	Jun	Jul	Aug	Sep	Oct	Nov	Dec	Year
Mean daily maximum °F (°C)	32 (0)	35 (2)	42 (6)	56 (13)	68 (20)	77 (25)	81 (27)	80 (27)	73 (23)	60 (16)	48 (9)	37 (3)	57 (14)
Mean daily minimum °F (°C)	17 (−8)	18 (−8)	25 (−4)	37 (3)	47 (8)	57 (14)	61 (16)	59 (15)	52 (11)	42 (6)	34 (1)	24 (−4)	39 (4)
Average precipitation inches (mm)	1.91 (49)	1.87 (47)	2.52 (64)	3.26 (83)	3.16 (80)	3.76 (96)	3.52 (89)	3.16 (80)	4.01 (102)	3.42 (87)	3.22 (82)	2.42 (61)	36.23 (920)

== Transportation ==
Trumansburg is bisected by NY Route 96, a state highway, enlarged and re-routed in 1961, that runs north to Waterloo and south to Ithaca. Tompkins Consolidated Area Transit (TCAT) (Route 21) provides local bus service to Ithaca with connections to long-distance bus and air service there.

In the 19th century, Trumansburg had a port at Frontenac Point, at the mouth of the Trumansburg Creek on Cayuga Lake. The lake is connected at its north end to the Erie Canal via the Cayuga–Seneca Canal. The docks, warehouses and hotels that made up the port have long since been torn down or have burned. Only scattered pilings remain, and the site is now Three Falls State Park.

The Lehigh Valley Railroad ran through Trumansburg between September 13, 1873, and October 1962, when the portion south to Ithaca was abandoned and most of the easements sold to the New York Gas & Electric Company (NYSEG). The portion north to Geneva was abandoned in 1967. In the last 15 years the state park system has bought back much of the right-of-way and is in the process of constructing a biking and hiking trail along the portion south to Ithaca. It is called the Black Diamond Trail, after the Lehigh Valley's premier passenger train that ran between New York City and Buffalo along the line (although not stopping in Trumansburg).

== Demographics ==
Historical population
Census	Pop.	Note	%±
1870	1,246		—
1880	1,376		10.4%
1890	1,211		−12.0%
1900	1,225		1.2%
1910	1,188		−3.0%
1920	1,011		−14.9%
1930	1,077		6.5%
1940	1,130		4.9%
1950	1,479		30.9%
1960	1,768		19.5%
1970	1,803		2.0%
1980	1,722		−4.5%
1990	1,611		−6.4%
2000	1,581		−1.9%
2010	1,797		13.7%
2020	1,714		−4.6%
U.S. Decennial Census

As of the census of 2000, there were 1,581 people, 682 households, and 424 families residing in the village. The population density was 1,309.5 inhabitants per square mile (505.6/km^{2}). There were 715 housing units at an average density of 592.2 per square mile (228.6/km^{2}). The racial makeup of the village was 96.52% White, 0.76% African American, 0.06% Native American, 0.70% Asian, 0.57% from other races, and 1.39% from two or more races. Hispanic or Latino of any race were 2.09% of the population.

There were 682 households, out of which 33.6% had children under the age of 18 living with them, 48.5% were married couples living together, 10.3% had a female householder with no husband present, and 37.8% were non-families. 33.0% of all households were made up of individuals, and 15.2% had someone living alone who was 65 years of age or older. The average household size was 2.32 and the average family size was 2.97.

In the village, the population was spread out, with 26.9% under the age of 18, 5.9% from 18 to 24, 23.0% from 25 to 44, 28.6% from 45 to 64, and 15.6% who were 65 years of age or older. The median age was 42 years. For every 100 females, there were 82.6 males. For every 100 females age 18 and over, there were 74.9 males.

The median income for a household in the village was $39,423, and the median income for a family was $58,194. Males had a median income of $41,167 versus $26,429 for females. The per capita income for the village was $22,773. About 5.0% of families and 6.5% of the population were below the poverty line, including 7.9% of those under age 18 and 7.7% of those age 65 or over.

== Education ==
It is in the Trumansburg Central School District.

== Notable people ==
- Hermann Biggs, physician and pioneer in the field of public health
- Ruth Stiles Gannett, children's book author best known for My Father's Dragon and its two sequels
- John Gurche, artist known for his paintings, sculptures, and sketches of prehistoric life, especially dinosaurs and early humans
- Alfred E. Kahn, economist and political advisor commonly known as the "Father of Airline Deregulation"
- John R. Levine, internet author and mayor of Trumansburg from 2004 until 2007
- Robert Moog, engineer and pioneer of electronic music
- Edward Ormondroyd, children's book author best known for David and the Phoenix
- Sandra Steingraber, biologist, author, and faculty member at Cornell University
- Richard Clyde Taylor, metaphysical philosopher and author
