= Ulysses Philomathic Library =

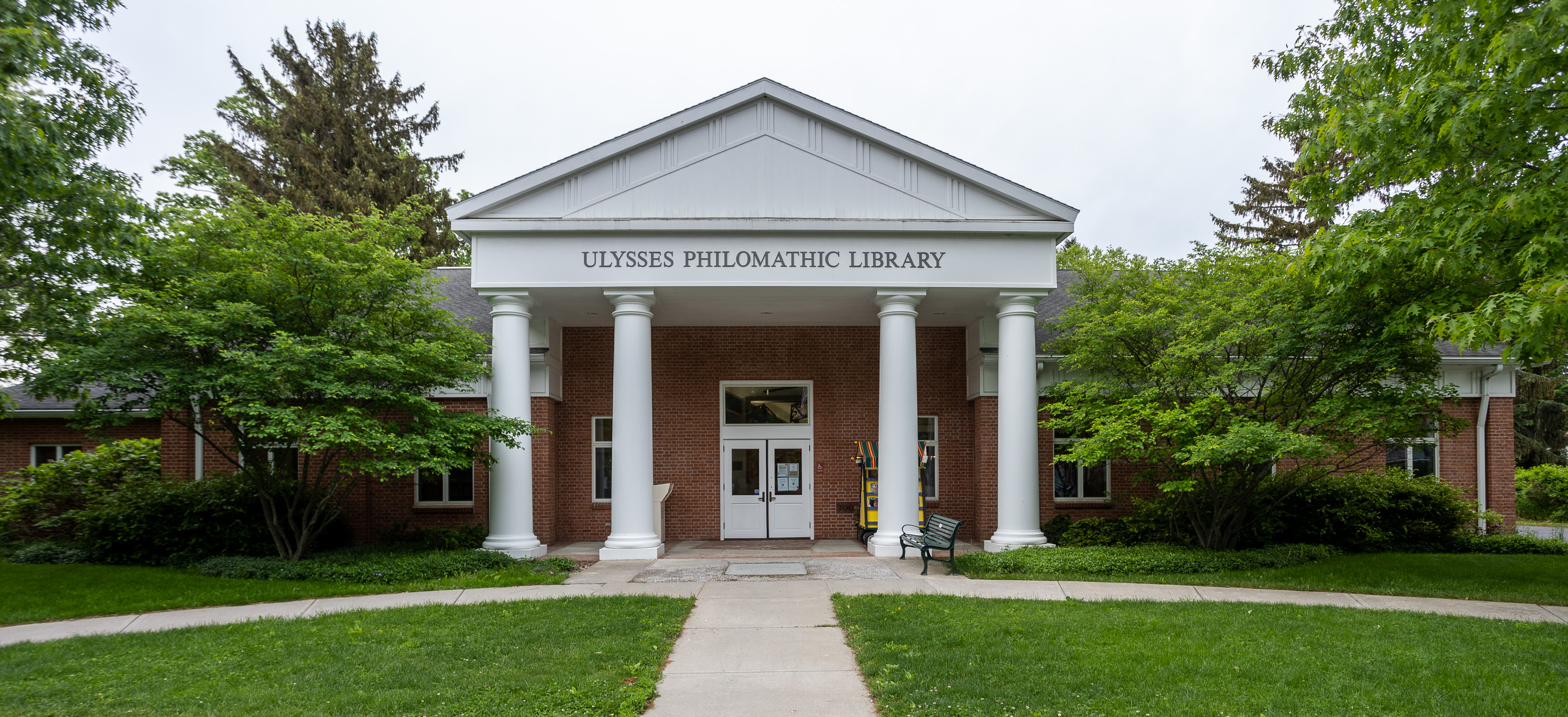
- The library in 2021
- 42.54077°N 76.65892°W
- Location: Trumansburg, New York
- Established: 1811
- Branches: 1

Collection
- Size: 20,000

Access and use
- Circulation: 66,000
- Population served: 4,775
- Members: 4,137 registered borrowers

Other information
- Budget: $266,746
- Director: Ksana Broadwell
- Employees: 7
- Website: http://www.trumansburglibrary.org/

Ulysses Philomathic Library is a public library in the village of Trumansburg, New York which is located within the town of Ulysses. The town existed at the time the library was founded as a private association in 1811 but the village was not incorporated until 1872. Philomathic means “love of learning”. The library serves the town of 4,775 residents according to the 2000 census. Work began on the current Greek Revival and brick library building in June 2000. The library is a member of the Finger Lakes Library System.

== Funding ==
Approximately 60% of the library funding comes from municipal funding - town, village, county and taxes that are levied but not given by the school district.

== Staff ==
Staff at the library include the director, reference and youth librarians, an administrative assistant, volunteer coordinator, program, publicity, and circulation assistants. Teens are hired through the county and town youth programs help them out year round. Many roles are filled by volunteers such as circulation desk assistants, shelvers, book processing and repair, and buildings and grounds maintenance.

== Governance ==
The library is chartered as an Association Library and run by a 15 member board of directors that oversees the library director, who in turn supervises staff and volunteers.

== Mission ==
The Ulysses Philomathic Library is an educational and cultural resource center which strives to meet the informational, creative and leisure needs of all community residents. To that end, the library will provide a broad collection of materials and access to a wide network of contemporary resources and media.
