= Indian Fort Road Site =

- U.S. National Register of Historic Places
- Nearest city: Trumansburg, New York
- Area: 12 acres (4.9 ha)
- NRHP reference No.: 83001810
- Added to NRHP: September 30, 1983

Indian Fort Road Site is an archaeological site located at Trumansburg in Tompkins County, New York.

It was listed on the National Register of Historic Places in 1983.
