= Austin House (Sarasota, Florida) =

Historic house in Florida, United States

- U.S. National Register of Historic Places
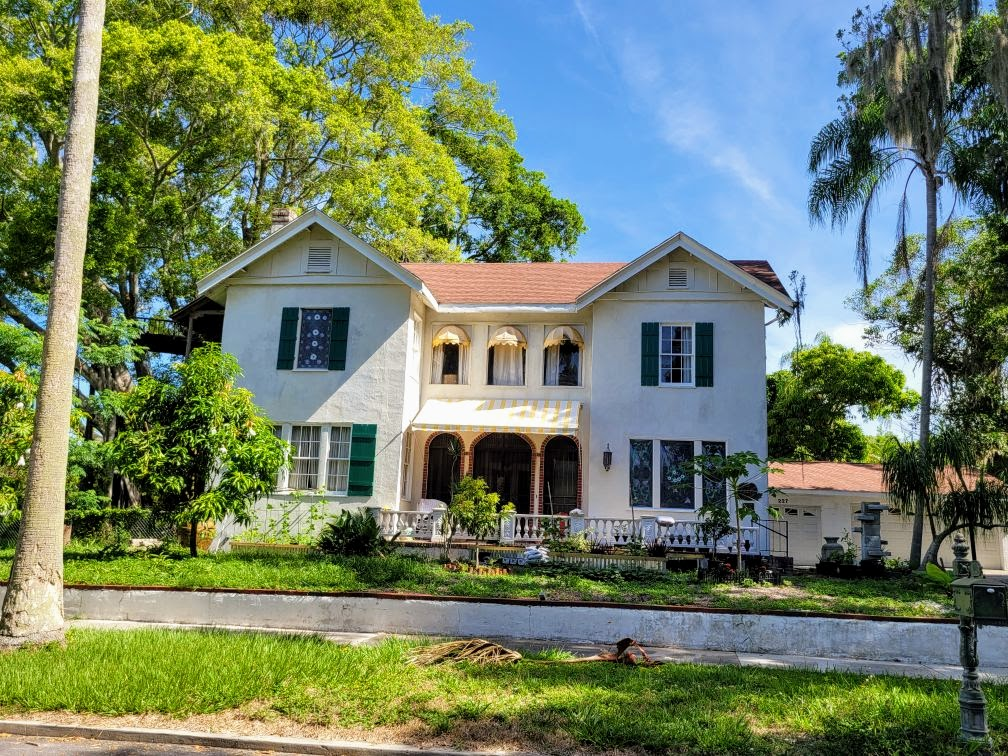

- Location within Florida Location within the United States
- Location: Sarasota, Florida
- Coordinates: 27°24′16″N 82°34′14″W
- Built: c. 1926
- Built by: T. A. Monk
- NRHP reference No.: 98000062
- Added to NRHP: February 5, 1998

Austin House is a historic home located at 227 Delmar Avenue, Sarasota, Florida in Manatee County. It was added to the National Register of Historic Places on February 5, 1998.

The house was built circa 1926 during the Florida land boom. The house was purchased by Arthur "Chick" Everett Austin Jr. in 1947, as part of his move to Sarasota to become the director of the John and Mable Ringling Museum. Austin renovated the home and included a ballroom.
