= Drury-Austin House =

Historic house in Maryland, United States

- U.S. National Register of Historic Places
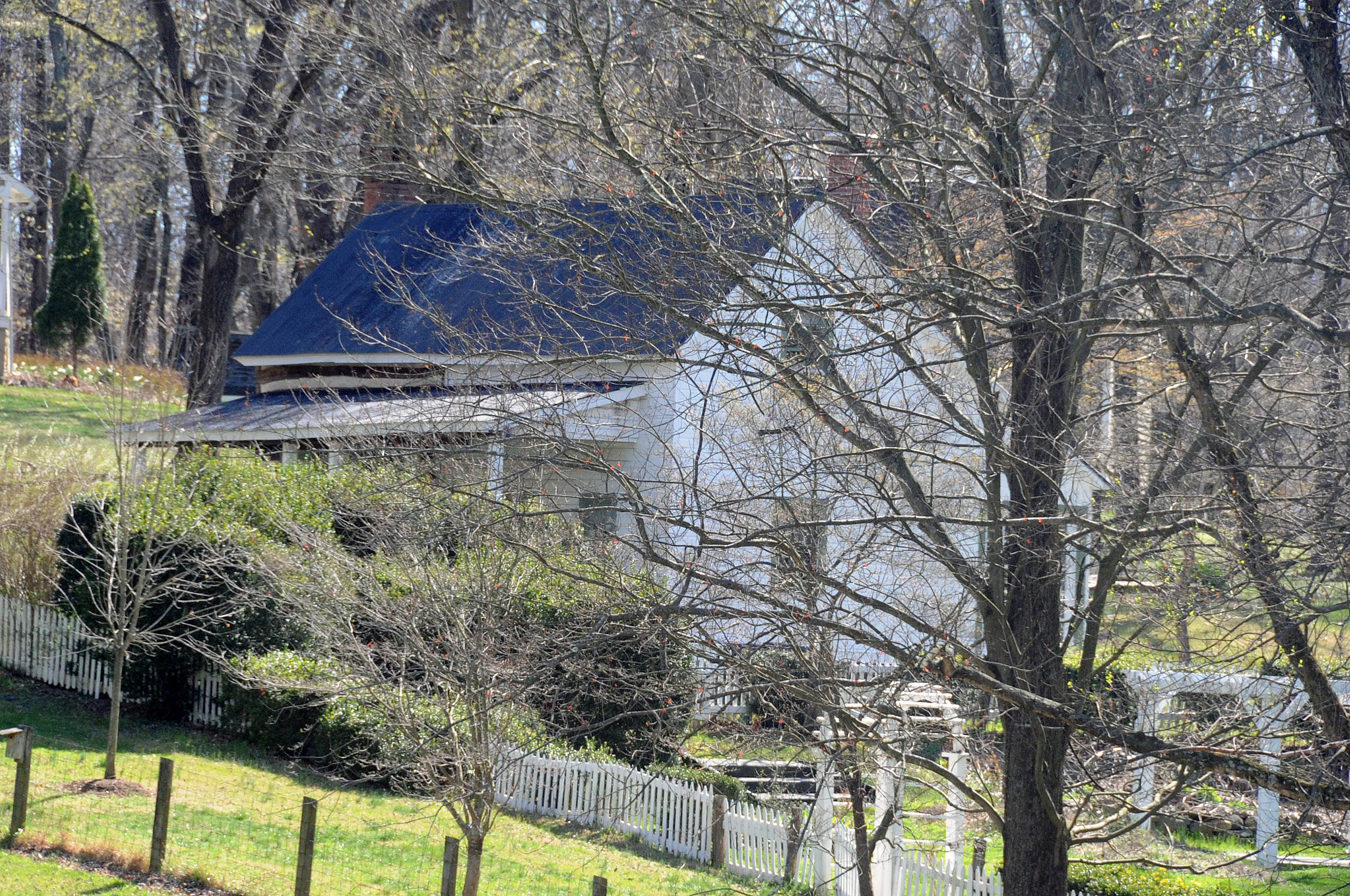

- Location within Maryland Location within the United States
- Location: 16112 Barnesville Rd., Boyds, Maryland
- Coordinates: 39°12′3″N 77°20′21″W
- Area: 0.5 acres (0.20 ha)
- Built: 1768
- Built by: Drury, Thomas
- NRHP reference No.: 86000371
- Added to NRHP: March 13, 1986

The Drury-Austin House is a historic home located at Boyds, Montgomery County, Maryland. It is a 1 1/2-story dwelling comprising two sections: a late-18th-century one-room plan log house (the southern half), which was doubled in size by the addition of a one-room timber-frame section in the early 19th century. The house is exemplary of the type of dwelling that characterized western Montgomery County in the earliest phase of its settlement.

It was listed on the National Register of Historic Places in 1986.
