= Austin–Magie Farm and Mill District =

Historic district in Ohio, United States

Coordinates: 39°31′32″N 84°43′56″W

- Austin-Magie Farm and Mill District
- U.S. National Register of Historic Places
- U.S. Historic district
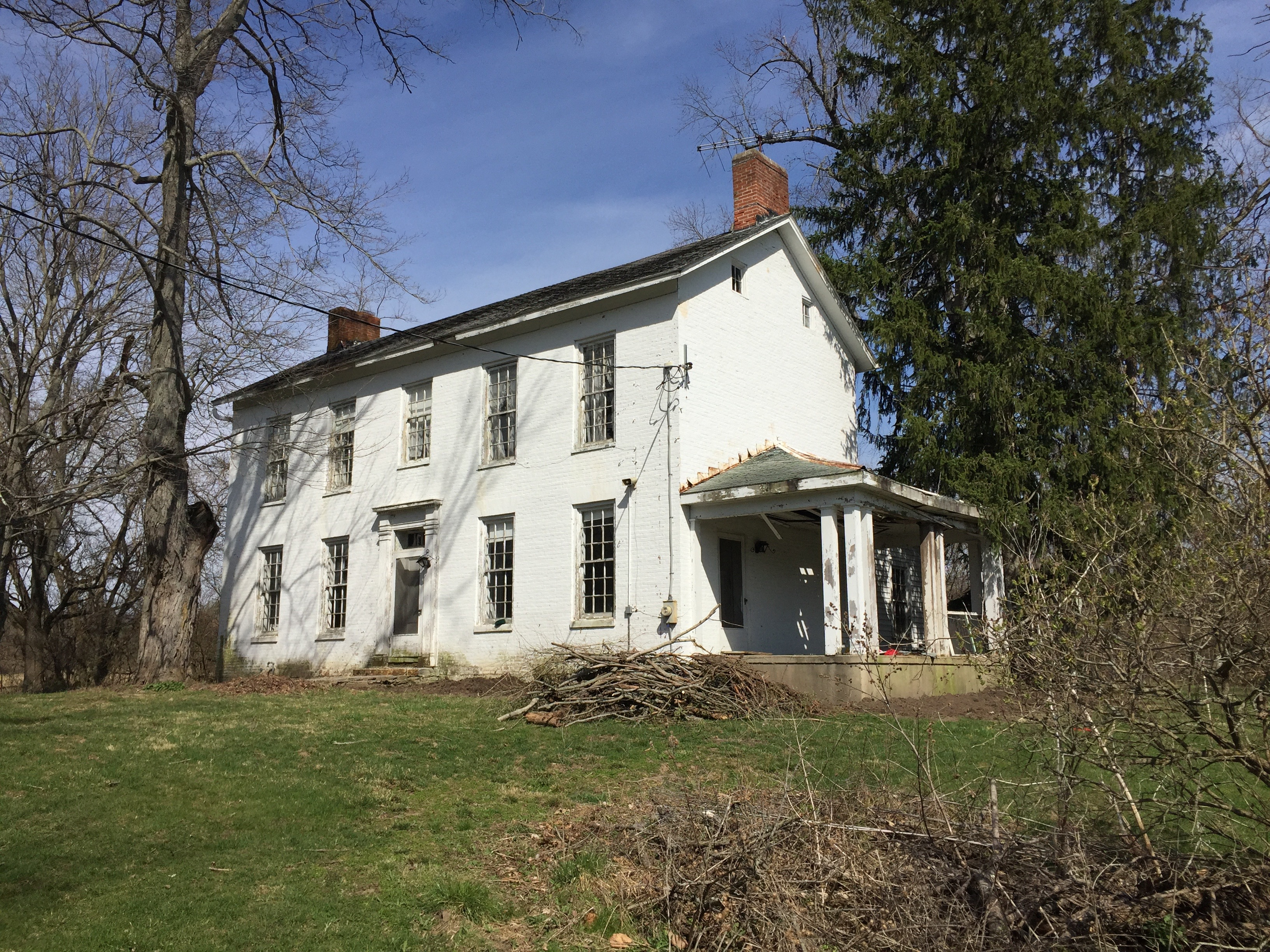
- Roadside view of the farmhouse

- Location within Ohio Location within the United States
- Nearest city: Oxford, Ohio
- Area: 340 acres (1.4 km^{2})
- Architect: Aaron Austin
- NRHP reference No.: 82001360
- Added to NRHP: December 21, 1982

Austin–Magie Farm and Mill District is a registered historic district near Oxford, Ohio, listed in the National Register on December 21, 1982. It contains 5 contributing buildings.

The farm, mill site and millrace are significant as they represent the intensive nineteenth century agricultural and processing activities in Butler County, Ohio. Between 1815–1916, the Austin–Pugh mills were an integral component of this area's industry and commerce. The main farmhouse, built 1841, is a solid embodiment of rural vernacular architecture, and the associated outbuildings enhance the agrarian setting. The limestone mill foundation and mile-long mill race are tangible evidence of Oxford Township's largest mill complex. Aaron Austin, builder of the house, and mill owned the property from 1815–1863.

Subsequently, the property was acquired by David M. Magie, one of Ohio's most prominent stock farmers and swine breeders. As early as 1837 Magie had earned a reputation for his superior breed of swine. These large, well proportioned hogs, forerunners of the Poland China breed, were widely known as the "Magie Breed." Many agrarian historians consider the Poland China hog Ohio's greatest contribution to the breeding of fine livestock in the United States.

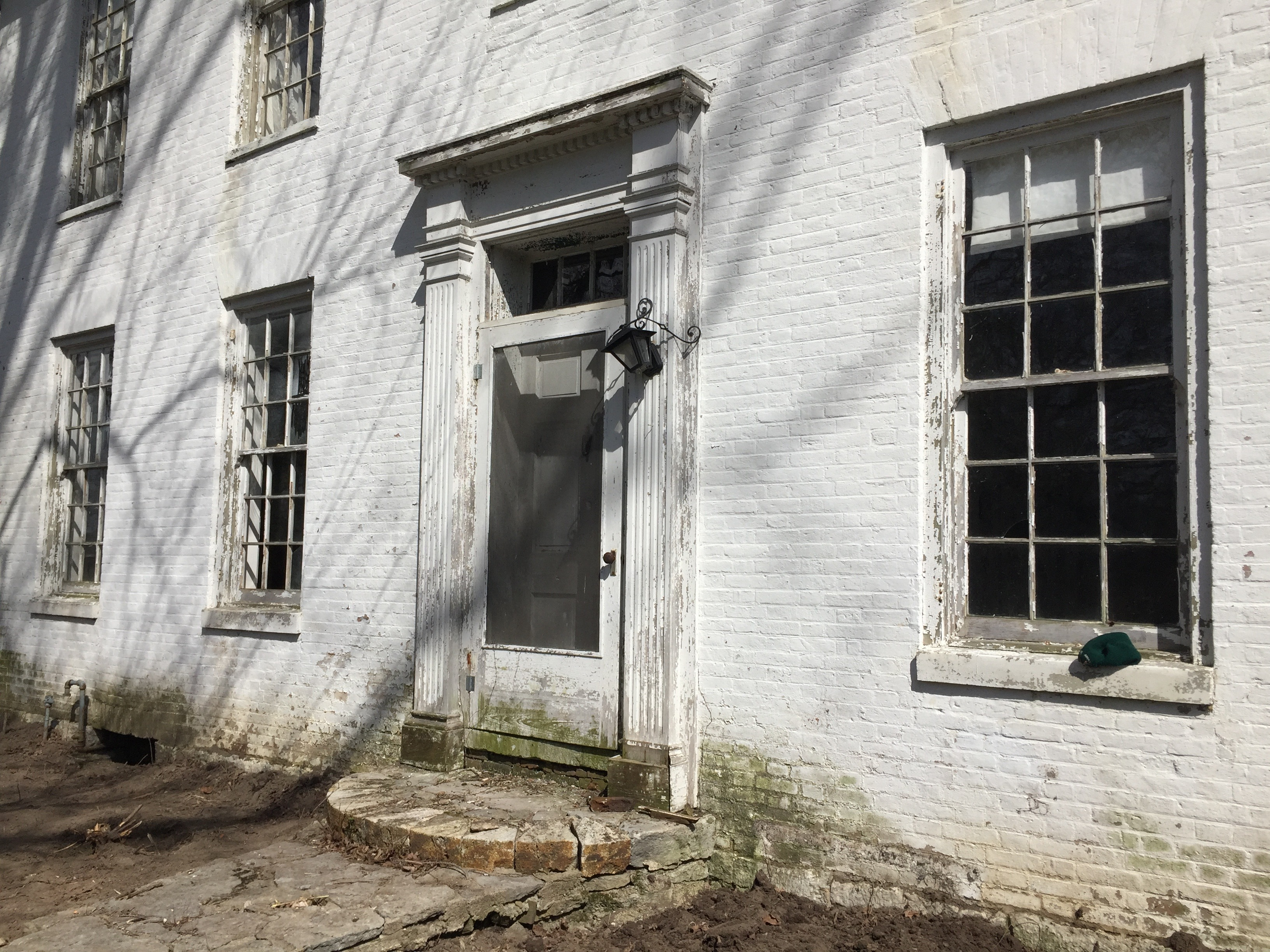
The entry has been embellished, probably by David M. Magie after he acquired the property in 1863.

== Historic uses ==
- Single Dwelling
- Animal Facility
- Manufacturing Facility
