= Austin Historic District (Austin, Nevada) =

Historic district in Nevada, United States

- U.S. National Register of Historic Places
- U.S. Historic district
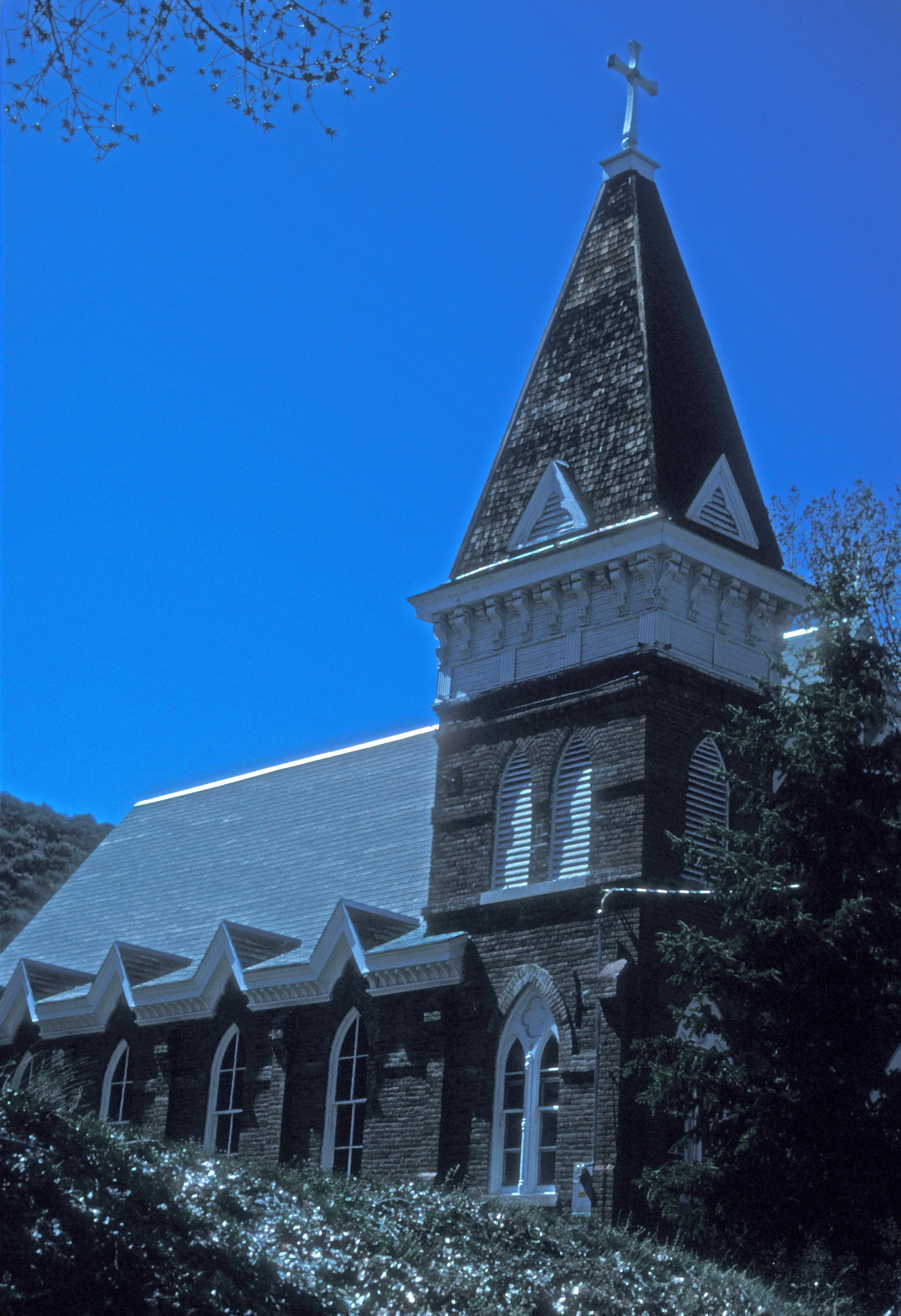

- Location within Nevada Location within the United States
- Location: In Pony Canyon at jct. of U.S. 50 and NV 8A, Austin, Nevada
- Coordinates: 39°29′37″N 117°04′15″W
- Area: 748 acres (303 ha)
- Built: 1862
- NRHP reference No.: 71000489
- Added to NRHP: November 23, 1971

The Austin Historic District in Austin, Nevada is a 748-acre (303 ha) historic district that was listed on the U.S. National Register of Historic Places in 1971. It is located in Pony Canyon at the junction of Nevada State Route 305 (formerly State Route 8A) and U.S. Route 50, and has significance dating from 1862 when silver ore was discovered in the canyon. By the next year, Austin had population 2,000, and it became a city in 1864.

The district includes the Austin City Hall, which is separately NRHP-listed, and 12 other contributing buildings. It was listed on the National Register in 1971.
