= Thomas Austin House =

Historic house in Utah, United States

- U.S. National Register of Historic Places
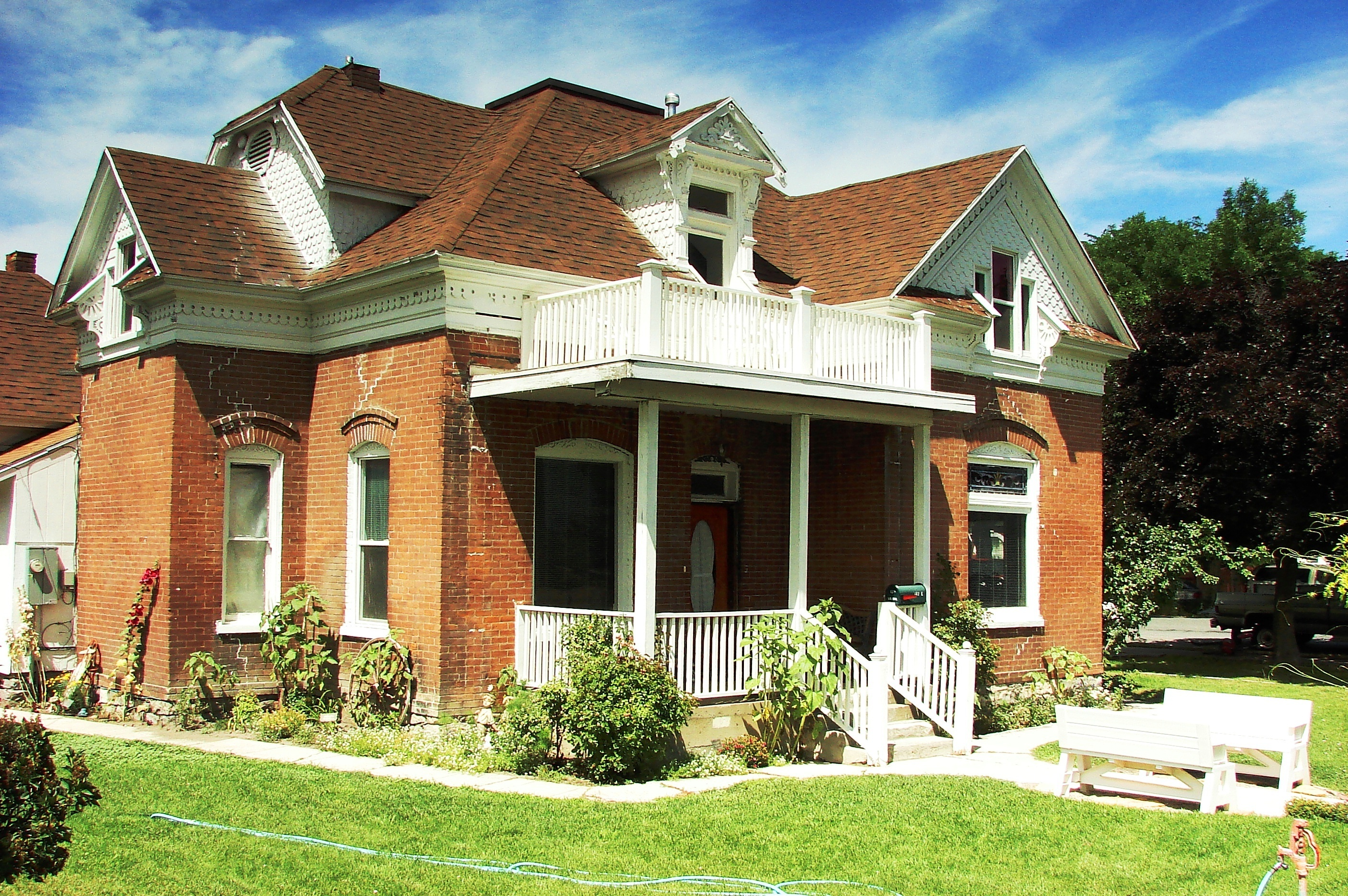

- Location within Utah Location within the United States
- Location: 427 East 500 North, Lehi, Utah
- Coordinates: 40°23′39″N 111°50′32″W
- Area: less than one acre
- Built: 1901
- Architectural style: Victorian
- NRHP reference No.: 82004168
- Added to NRHP: July 26, 1982

The Thomas Austin House is a historic house located in Lehi, Utah. It was listed on the National Register of Historic Places on July 26, 1982.

== Description and history ==
The two-story, Victorian style house was built for English-born local rancher Thomas Austin in 1901 for $4,000. According to its NRHP nomination, it is "the best example in Lehi of Victorian domestic architecture." And: "At a time when eclecticism and irregularity in house design was at a premium, the Austin House projects an asymmetry of massing and mixing of historical details which is truly exceptional."
