= Austin Hall (Ohio Wesleyan University) =

- U.S. National Register of Historic Places
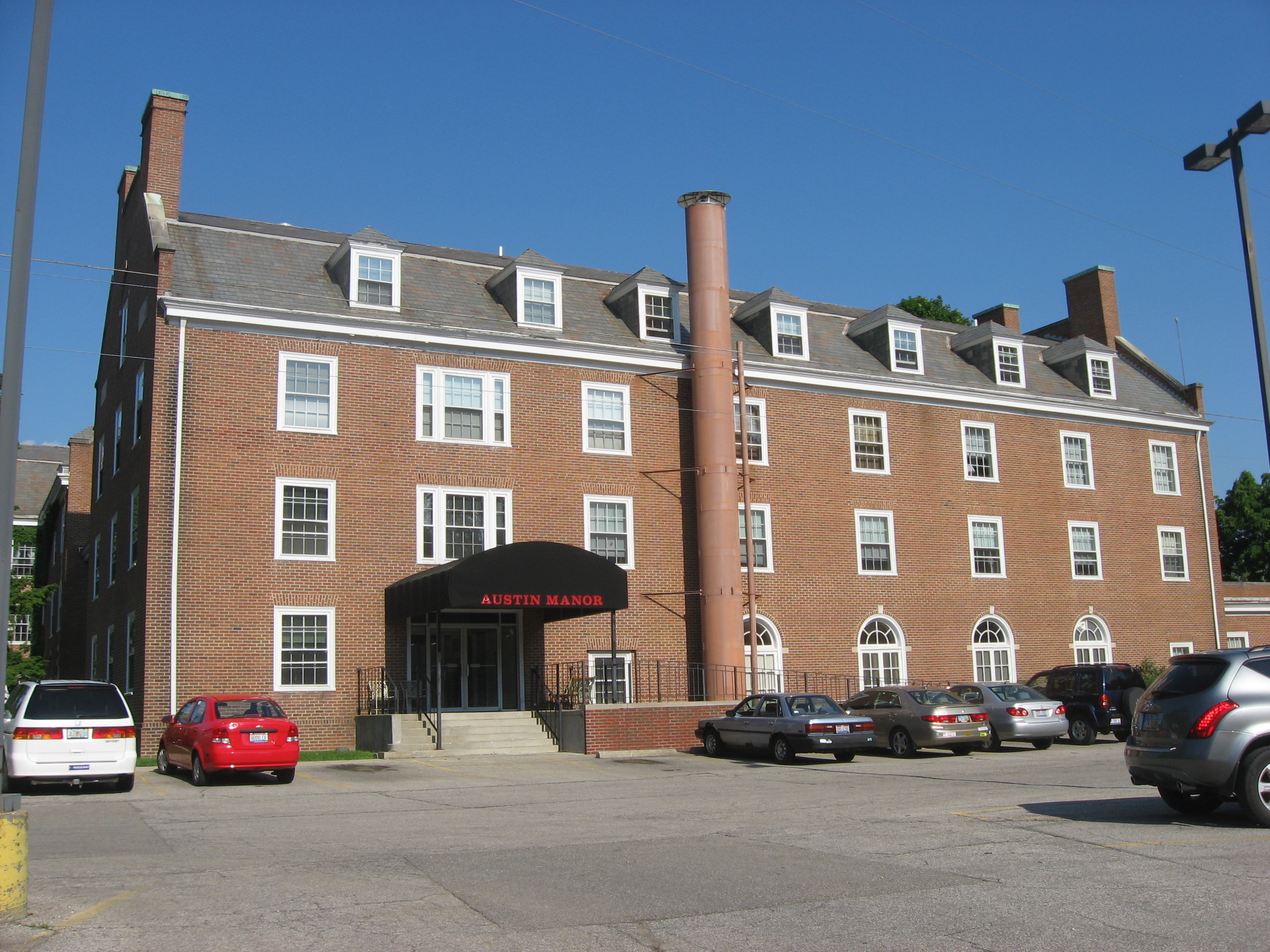
- Rear of Austin Hall

- Location within Ohio Location within the United States
- Location: 95 Elizabeth St., Delaware, Ohio
- Coordinates: 40°18′6″N 83°4′37″W
- Built: 1923
- Architectural style: Colonial Revival
- MPS: Ohio Wesleyan University TR
- NRHP reference No.: 85000631
- Added to NRHP: March 18, 1985

Austin Hall, also called Austin Manor, is a historic building in Delaware, Ohio. It was listed in the National Register of Historic Places on March 18, 1985. Originally built in 1923 on the campus of Ohio Wesleyan University, it was sold by the university in 2018.
