= Eliphalet Austin House =

- U.S. National Register of Historic Places
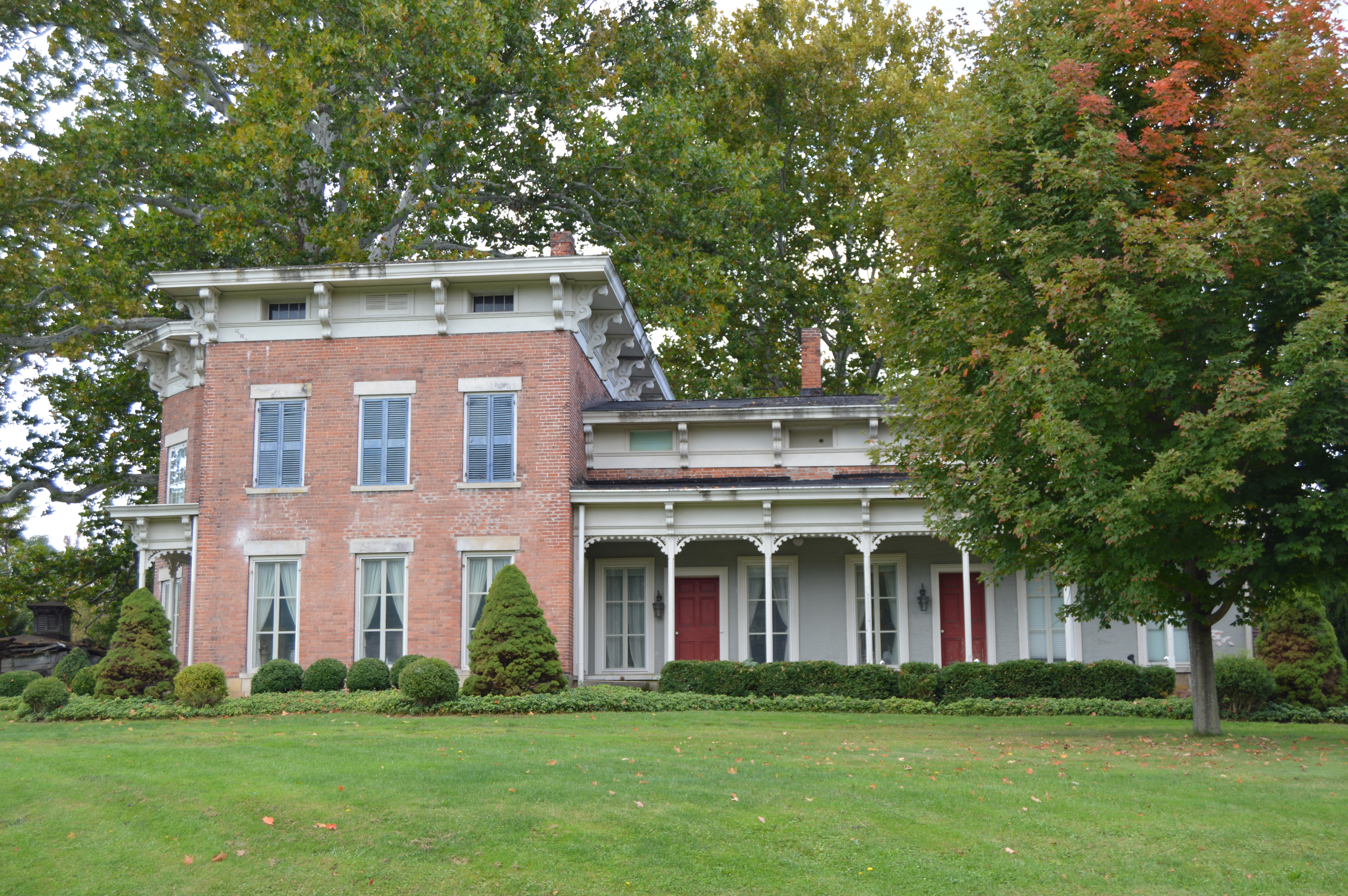
- Front of the house

- Location within Ohio Location within the United States
- Location: 1879 State Route 45, Austinburg, Ohio
- Coordinates: 41°46′31″N 80°51′19″W
- Area: 1 acre (0.40 ha)
- Built: 1815
- Architectural style: Italian Villa
- NRHP reference No.: 75001313
- Added to NRHP: February 24, 1975

The Eliphalet Austin House is a historic residence in the community of Austinburg, Ohio, United States. Constructed by the community's namesake founder, it has been greatly modified by later owners, and it has been named a historic site.

The Connecticut Land Company was formed in the late eighteenth century to settle and develop the section of western Connecticut that later became the Connecticut Western Reserve region of Ohio. Eliphalet Austin joined the company and purchased wide tracts of land throughout the region, including present-day Austinburg Township, which bears his name. He settled at present-day Austinburg in 1799 and, according to local tradition, arranged for the construction of the present house in 1811. As northeastern Ohio developed, he became regionally prominent: his land holdings were located in multiple counties, he was responsible for carrying the mails, he operated a cattle-dealing operation, and he was a state senator from 1829 to 1831. Austin's descendants inherited his property after his death.

Austin's house is a brick structure in the Italianate style. Its appearance is radically different from that of its earliest years; it appears that the present appearance was the result of an extensive remodelling project conducted under the auspices of Austin's grandson Louis B. Austin during the 1860s. Precise documentation of the remodelling is not extant, but numerous details are typical of the 1860s, and no extant building anywhere in the United States is known to have employed the Italianate style before 1844.

In 1975, Austin's house was listed on the National Register of Historic Places, qualifying for inclusion both because of its historically significant architecture and because of its place as the home of a regionally significant man. It is one of three National Register-listed properties in Austinburg Township, along with the nearby Congregational Church of Austinburg and the L.W. Peck House in the community of Eagleville.
