= Hiram B. Austin House =

Historic house in Alabama, United States

- U.S. National Register of Historic Places
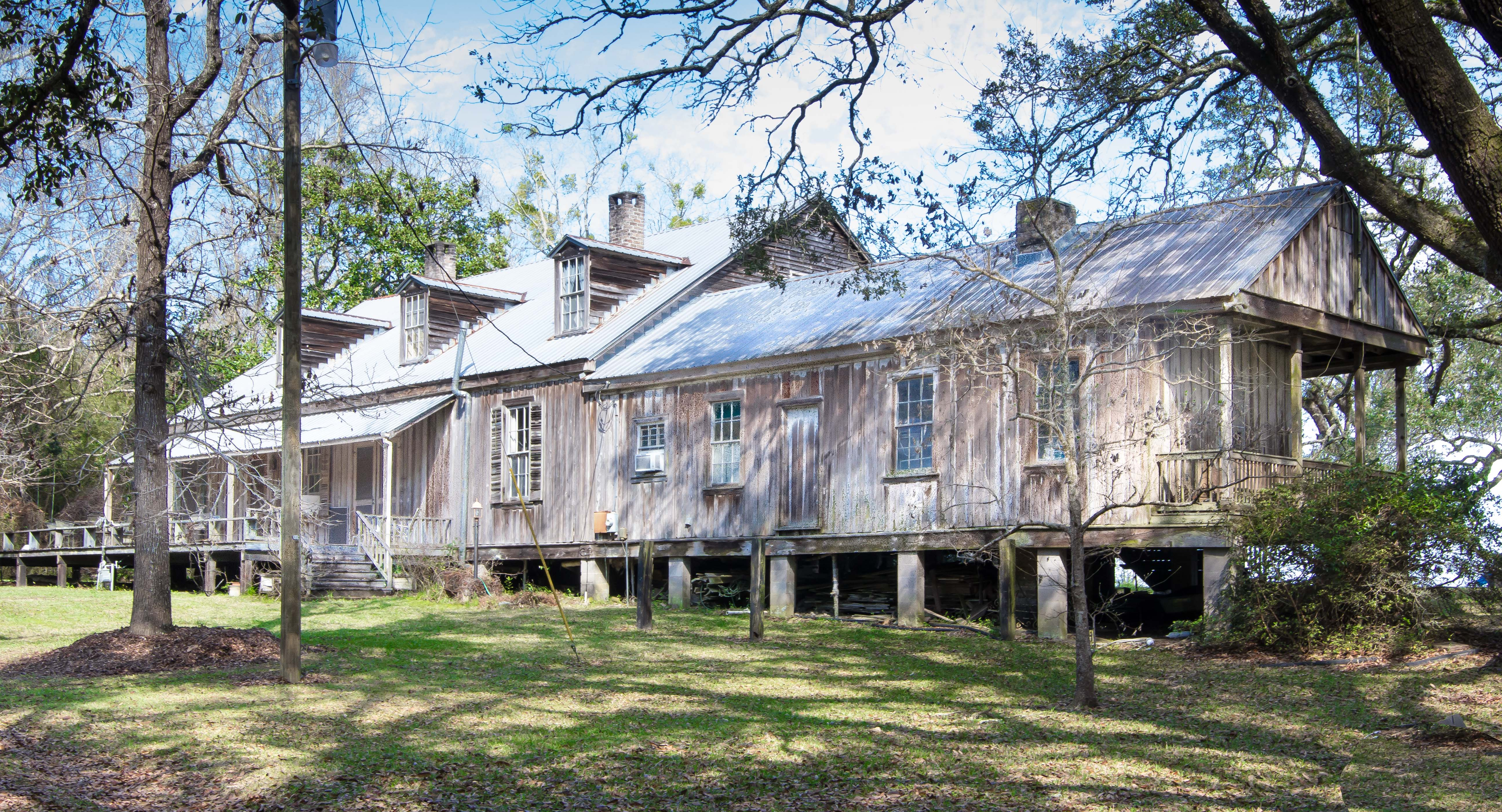

- Location within Alabama Location within the United States
- Nearest city: Mon Louis Island
- Coordinates: 30°25′12″N 88°6′17″W
- Area: 1.4 acres (0.57 ha)
- Built: 1837
- Architectural style: Bay House, Gulf Coast Cottage
- NRHP reference No.: 88000106
- Added to NRHP: February 11, 1988

The Hiram B. Austin House is a historic residence on Mon Louis Island in Mobile County, Alabama, United States. Situated on the western shore of Mobile Bay, the 1 1/2-story wood-frame structure was built in 1837 in the Gulf Coast Cottage style. It was placed on the National Register of Historic Places on February 11, 1988.
