= Austin Historic District =

Austin Historic District may refer to:

- Austin Historic District (Chicago, Illinois), listed on the National Register of Historic Places in Chicago, Illinois
- Austin Town Hall Park Historic District, listed on the NRHP in Chicago, Illinois
- Austin Historic District (Austin, Nevada), listed on the National Register of Historic Places in Lander County, Nevada
- Austin Farm Road Agricultural Area, a historic district listed on the NRHP in Exeter, Rhode Island
- Old West Austin Historic District, Austin, Texas, listed on the NRHP in Texas

== See also ==
- Austinberg Historic District, Covington, Kentucky, listed on the National Register of Historic Places in Kenton County, Kentucky
