= William Austin House (Park City, Utah) =

- U.S. National Register of Historic Places
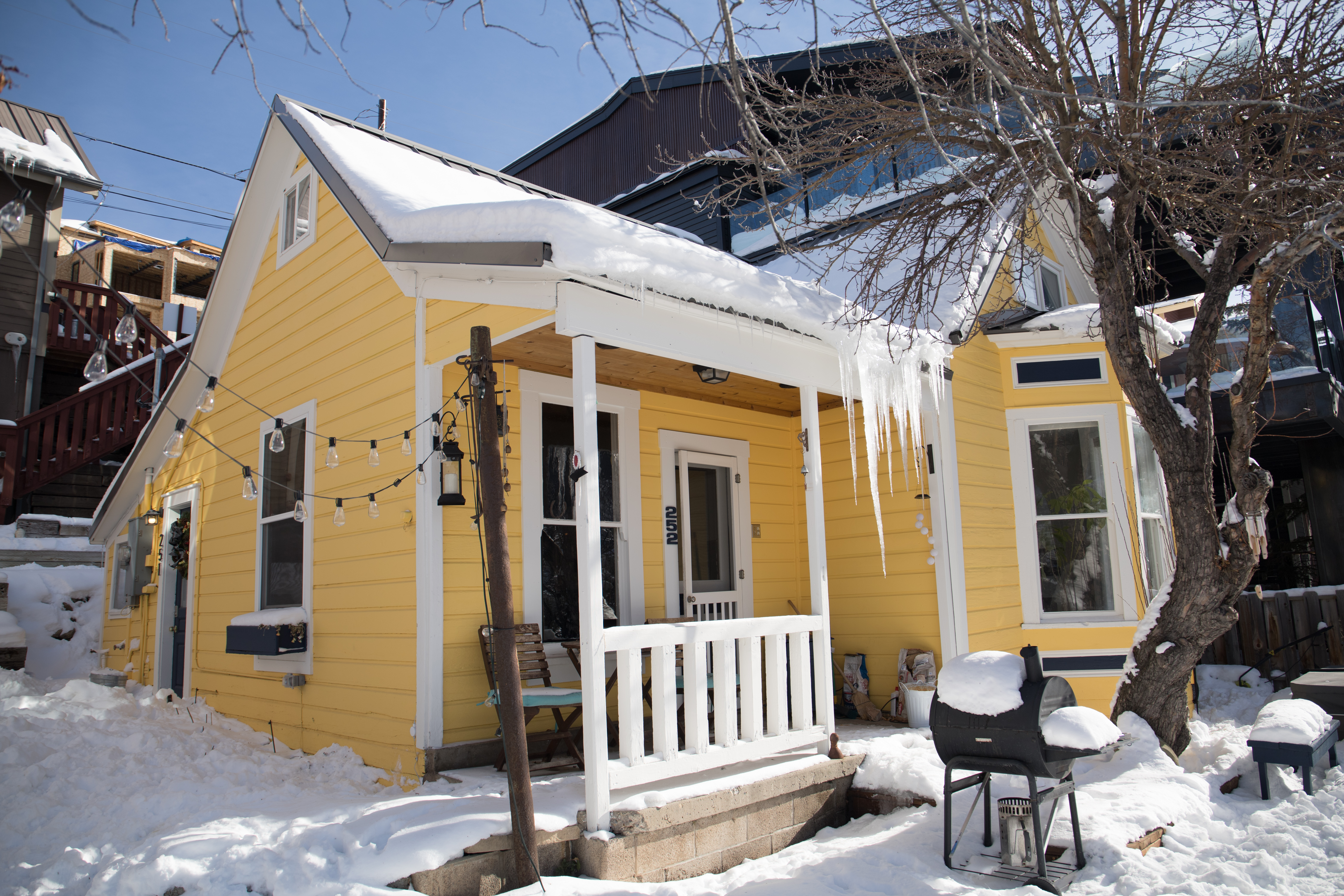

- Location within Utah Location within the United States
- Location: 247 Ontario Ave., Park City, Utah
- Coordinates: 40°38′32″N 111°29′32″W
- Area: less than one acre
- Built: c.1890
- MPS: Mining Boom Era Houses TR
- NRHP reference No.: 84002226
- Added to NRHP: July 11, 1984

The William Austin House, at 247 Ontario Ave. in Park City, Utah was built around 1890. It was listed on the National Register of Historic Places in 1984.

It, among a group of 17 buildings, was deemed "architecturally significant as one of 78 extant T/L cottages in Park City".
