= Austin Masonic and Odd Fellows Hall =

- U.S. National Register of Historic Places
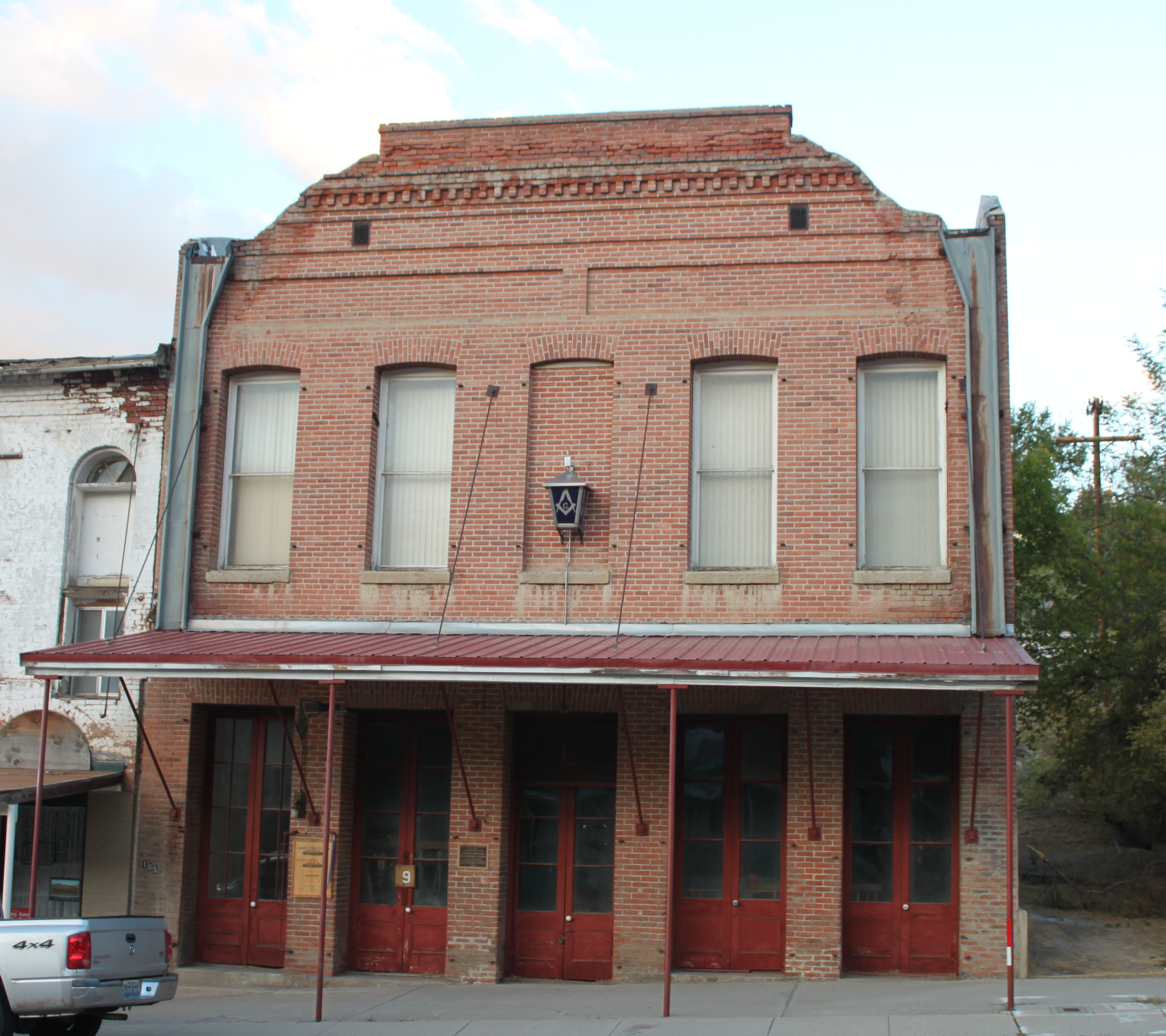

- Location within Nevada Location within the United States
- Location: 625 Main St., Austin, Nevada
- Coordinates: 39°29′34″N 117°4′10″W
- Area: 0.1 acres (0.040 ha)
- Built: 1867
- Built by: Pearce, Richard
- Architectural style: Masonic Temple
- NRHP reference No.: 03000756
- Added to NRHP: August 14, 2003

The Austin Masonic and Odd Fellows Hall is a building in Austin, Nevada that was built in 1867. Historically, it served as a meeting hall and a business. It was listed on the National Register of Historic Places in 2003.

It is a brick building with stretcher-bond brickwork on its front and American bond on the sides and rear. It has a tall front parapet with dentil-like corbels.
