= William Austin (English writer) =

English miscellaneous writer

William Austin (1587–1634) was an English miscellaneous writer. He was a barrister of Lincoln's Inn, and resided for many years in Southwark, where he acquired a great local reputation.

== Works ==
His works, which are mainly of a religious character, were all published posthumously, but in his lifetime he distributed copies of them among his friends, among whom were James Howell and his neighbour Edward Alleyn. Austin's name appeared on the proposed list of members of the Royal Academy of Literature, projected in 1620, but later abandoned. In a letter dated 20 August 1628 Howell thanks Austin in extravagant terms for "that excellent poem ... upon the Passion of Christ" which "transported me into a true Elysium", and urges him to publish "the other precious pieces of yours which you have been pleased to impart unto me". Austin died on 16 Jan 1633—4, at the age of 47 and unpublished. He was buried in the parish church of St. Mary Overy or St. Saviour's, Southwark, of which he and his family had been benefactors. An elaborate monument stood above his grave, erected by Austin himself from his own designs to the memory of his first wife.

In 1635 there appeared a folio volume entitled titled "Devotionis Augustinianæ Flamma, or Certayne Devout, Godly, and Learned Meditations: written by the Excelently Acomplisht Gentleman, William Austin of Lincolnes Inne, Esquier." The title-page, which contains an admirably engraved portrait of the author, states that the work had been "set forth after his decease by his deare wife and executrix, Mrs. Anne Austin." The book opens with a meditation for Lady Day, written in 1621, and closes with a funeral sermon in prose, and an epicedium or funeral dirge in verse, composed by Austin for himself, in which he deplores the loss of his first wife and many of his children. Two series of poems, entitled respectively' Carols for Christmas Day' and 'Meditations for Good Friday,' are included in the volume, and to the latter Howell probably referred in the letter already noticed. Almost every page of the book displays a wide knowledge of the Bible and patristic literature, and justifies to some extent a friend's estimate of Austin as a gentleman highly approved for his religion, learning, and exquisite ingenuity.' A second edition of the 'Meditations' was published in 1637, and its success encouraged Austin's friends to produce in the same year another of his works entitled 'Hæc Homo, wherein the Excellency of the Creation of Woman is described by way of an Essay,' 12mo. The book consists of dreary scholastic disquisitions based on scriptural and classical quotations, and is said to have been suggested by Agrippa's 'De Nobilitate et Præcellentia Fœminei Sexus.' It is inscribed to 'Mistresse Mary Griffith,' to whom the editors refer as the author's 'paterne.' Before 1671, a third work of Austin's, a translation of Cicero's 'Cato Maior, or the Book of Old Age... with annotations upon the men and places,' was published by a London stationer into whose hands the manuscript had accidentally fallen. It reached a second edition in 1671, and a third in 1684.
