= William Austin House (Trumansburg, New York) =

Historic house in New York, United States

- U.S. National Register of Historic Places
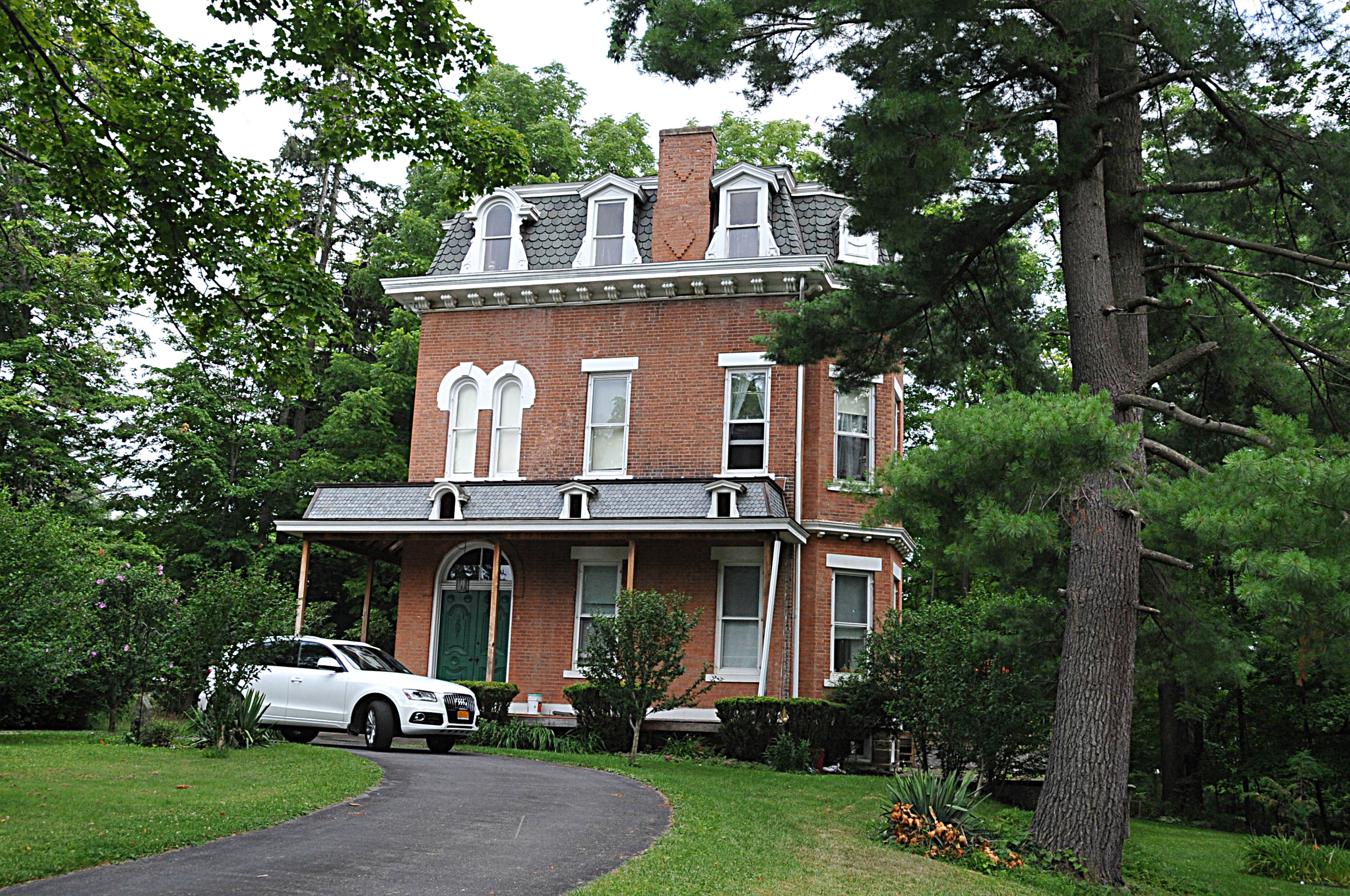

- Location within New York Location within the United States
- Location: 34 Seneca St., Trumansburg, New York
- Coordinates: 42°32′40″N 76°40′1″W
- Area: 0.7 acres (0.28 ha)
- Built: 1870
- Architectural style: Second Empire
- NRHP reference No.: 02000798
- Added to NRHP: July 19, 2002

The William Austin House is a historic house located at 34 Seneca Street in Trumansburg, Tompkins County, New York.

== Description and history ==
The William Austin House (34 Seneca Street, Trumansburg, NY 14886) was listed on the National Register of Historic Places in 2002. Portions of the text below were adapted from a copy of the original nomination document.

Description

The William Austin House, built in 1870, is a fashionable, Second Empire style brick dwelling located in the northwestern fringes of the historic core of the village of Trumansburg. The immediate neighborhood around the Austin House consists of late nineteenth and early twentieth century dwellings on relatively small village lots informally landscaped with lawns and mature trees and shrubbery. The dwelling is located on a .68-acre corner lot at the intersection of Seneca and Bradley Streets; a circular gravel driveway provides access to the front (south) facade of the house overlooking Seneca Street. There are no outbuildings located on the property.

The Austin house consists of a large, essentially rectangular, 2 1/2-story brick main block and an asymmetrically placed rear wing. Overall features of the building include slate-clad, Mansard roofs pierced by dormer windows accented by round or miter-arched lintels; broadly projecting eaves supported by elaborate scroll brackets; and generally regular fenestration, with paired and single double-hung sash predominating. Most window openings are rectangular and feature simple iron sills and flat-arched iron lintels; the second story of the front facade is enlivened by a prominent pair of round-arched windows with keystoned iron lintels. Third-story dormer windows are generally rectangular, although a few asymmetrically placed round-arched windows and oculi accentuate the Mansard roof.

The front facade and west elevation of the main block are dominated by a handsome verandah with a slate-clad, Mansard roof pierced by tiny, decorative dormer windows (with round or miter-arched lintels). Bold, square posts with elegant, molded details support the verandah's broadly projecting, bracketed eaves. The main entrance consists of a pair of molded wood doors surmounted by a large, round-arched fanlight. The east elevation of the main block features a prominent, two-story bay window; the east elevation of the rear (north) wing contains a secondary entrance with a small, yet handsome, porch with Victorian-inspired details similar to those found on the front verandah.

Many of the building's interior features survive with a high degree of integrity of design, materials and craftsmanship. Notable features include original room configurations, a variety of restrained Victorian era woodwork (window trim; baseboards; wainscoting) and original staircases. Of particular note are four marble fireplaces with elaborate Eastlake inspired details.

Significance

The William Austin House, built in 1870, is architecturally significantly as an outstanding example of Second Empire style domestic architecture in the village of Trumansburg, Tompkins County. Characterized by a prominent, slate-clad Mansard roof, polychrome masonry construction, asymmetrical massing and elaborate, Victorian era ornamentation, it embodies all of the distinctive characteristics of the type and period.

The area that is now the village of Trumansburg was originally settled by Abner Treman (also spelled Tremaine), a Revolutionary War veteran who acquired a tract of land within New York State's Military Tract. Applying for his tract under the name of Abner Trimmins, Treman arrived in 1793 with his wife (Mary McLallen) and three children (Mary, Jonathan, and Annis). Treman is credited with establishing the first mill in the area that later became Trumansburg (name derived and corrupted from Treman/Tremaine). Trumansburg was one of several concentrations of settlement in the town of Ulysses, which was officially formed on March 5, 1799. By 1803, the first church (formed by Jedediah Chapman to serve the needs of a small group of Presbyterians) was built. The fast-slowing Taughanick Creek, ultimately emptying into Cayuga Lake, provided hydropower for a variety of early and mid-nineteenth century industrial ventures. On the eve of the Civil War, Ulysses boasted four main settlements: Trumansburg, Jacksonville, Waterburgh, and Halseyville. By 1860, there were six churches scattered throughout Ulysses; four were located in Trumansburg. Home to 1,052 souls (R. P. Smith's Historical and Statistical Gazetteer of New York State, 1860), Trumansburg also boasted numerous commercial establishments and the renowned Trumansburg Academy.

Trumansburg continued to flourish after the Civil War, rivaled only by the nearby city of Ithaca as Tompkins County's focal points of commercial, social, civic and educational activity. At this time, one of Trumansburg's foremost citizens was William Austin, a Civil War veteran who had served as a lieutenant colonel in the infantry of the 109th NY Vol. William, born in 1832, was the son of David R. and Lydia (Rhodes) Austin of nearby Odessa, NY. After the war, Austin was a prominent lawyer in Trumansburg; in 1872 he served as the village clerk. Befitting his prominent position in the community, Austin built a fashionable Second Empire style dwelling for his family (including his wife, Anne E., and their five daughters) in an upscale residential neighborhood of the bustling village. With the exception of some interior deterioration due to neglect, the building, as it stands today, remains an intact, representative example of Victorian era domestic architecture in Trumansburg. Characteristic features of the type and period — specifically, the Second Empire style — displayed by the house include a prominent, slat-clad Mansard roof with bracketed eaves and dormer windows; overall asymmetry in form, plan and massing; decorative window treatments, including molded iron lintels; and a sweeping verandah with a bracketed, Mansard roof supported by ornate wood columns.

William died in 1909 and Ann E. died in 1919, after which the house came into the possession of the by then married daughters, Mary Ogden, Ida Astinger, Elizabeth Wood, Helen Halsey and Pearl Haas. In 1928, the property was acquired by three young sisters in the Jeffery family, Mary Jane, Frances and Bessie. In 1951, the Jeffery sisters sold the property to the Dubois family, who leased the building out to a series of tenants between 1951 and 1969. The property changed ownership several times during the next few years; the longest subsequent tenant was the Neglia family between 1972 and 2001. The current owner, who purchased the neglected, but still grand, old house in January 2001, is [at the time of this writing] in the process of restoring the building (particularly the deteriorated interior features).

1. Portions of the text were adapted from a copy of the original nomination document. [1] Adaptation copyright © 2008, The Gombach Group.
1. Todd, Nancy L., NY State Division of Historic Preservation, William Austin House, Trumansburg, Tompkins County, New York, nomination document, 2002, National Park Service, National Register of Historic Places, Washington, D.C.

It was listed on the National Register of Historic Places on July 19, 2002. The nomination was submitted by Diane Layo McLafferty.
