= Austin City Hall (Austin, Nevada) =

- U.S. National Register of Historic Places
- U.S. Historic district – Contributing property
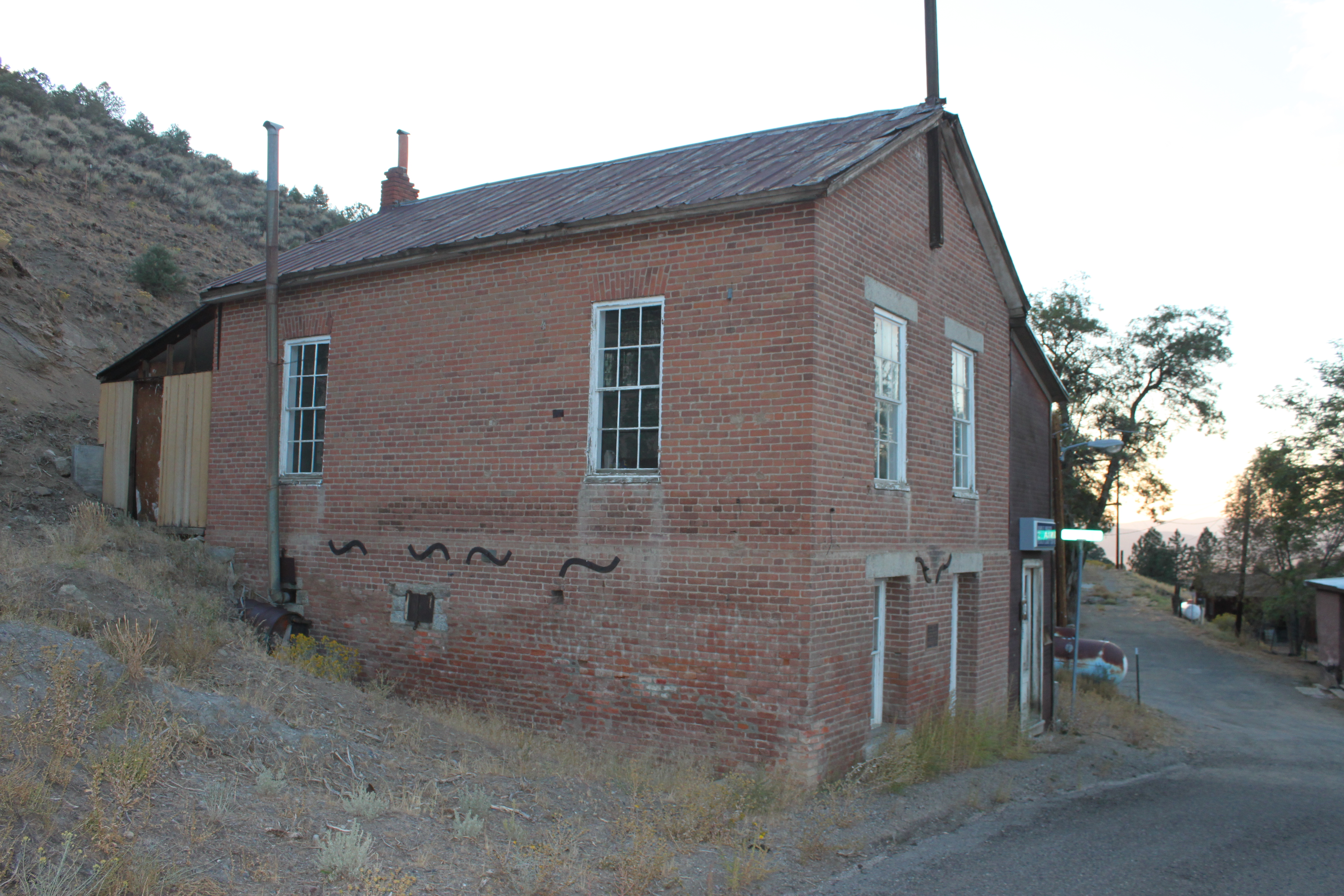

- Location within Nevada Location within the United States
- Location: 90 South St., Austin, Nevada
- Coordinates: 39°29′33″N 117°4′15″W
- Area: 0.2 acres (0.081 ha)
- Built: 1866; c.1904
- Built by: Richardson, L.; et al.
- NRHP reference No.: 03000754
- Added to NRHP: August 14, 2003

The Austin City Hall, at 90 South St. in Austin, Nevada, was built in 1866, when Austin was prosperous as a new silver mining city, and served as a city hall and jail. It has also been known as Austin Station House, as Austin American Legion Hall, and as Austin VFW Hall. It was listed on the National Register of Historic Places in 2003. It was deemed significant because it served Austin during most of the 1864–1881 period during which Austin was legally a city. The building was transferred to the local Knights of Pythias chapter and extended in c.1904; it was bought by the local American Legion chapter in 1947, and, as of 2003, continued to serve as a location for American Legion and for VFW meetings.

It is also a contributing building in the National Register-listed Austin Historic District.
