= List of historical societies in the United States =

This is a partial list of historical and heritage societies in the United States.

== National societies ==
- American Antiquarian Society
- American Historical Association
- American Baptist Historical Society
- Hereditary Society Community of the United States of America
- Jewish American Society for Historic Preservation
- National Council on Public History
- National Japanese American Historical Society
- Order of the Founders and Patriots of America
- Organization of American Historians
- Society of American Historians
- Shapell Manuscript Foundation

== State societies ==
Societies with museums include:

State or federal district	State historical society	State history museum
Alabama	Alabama Historical Commission	Alabama Department of Archives and History
Alaska	Alaska Historical Society	Alaska State Museum
Arizona	Arizona Historical Society	Arizona State Museum
Arkansas	Arkansas Historical Association	Historic Arkansas Museum
California	California Historical Society (ceased in 2025)	The California Museum
Colorado	History Colorado	History Colorado Center
Connecticut	Connecticut Museum of Culture and History	Museum of Connecticut History
Delaware	Delaware Historical Society	Delaware History Center
Florida	Florida Historical Society	Museum of Florida History
Georgia	Georgia Historical Society	None
Hawaiʻi	Hawaiian Historical Society	Hawaiian Historical Society
Idaho	Idaho State Historical Society	Idaho State Museum
Illinois	Illinois State Historical Society	Illinois State Museum
Indiana	Indiana Historical Society	Indiana State Museum
Iowa	State Historical Society of Iowa	State Historical Museum of Iowa
Kansas	Kansas Historical Society	Kansas Museum of History
Kentucky	Kentucky Historical Society	Kentucky Museum; Thomas D. Clark Center for Kentucky History
Louisiana	Louisiana Historical Society	Louisiana State Museum; Louisiana History Museum
Maine	Maine Historical Society	Maine State Museum; Maine Historical Society Museum
Maryland	Maryland Historical Society	Maryland Historical Society
Massachusetts	Massachusetts Historical Society	Commonwealth Museum
Michigan	Historical Society of Michigan	Michigan Historical Center
Minnesota	Minnesota Historical Society	Minnesota History Center
Mississippi	Mississippi Historical Society	Museum of Mississippi History
Missouri	State Historical Society of Missouri	Missouri State Museum
Montana	Montana Historical Society	Montana Historical Society Museum
Nebraska	History Nebraska	Nebraska History Museum
Nevada	Nevada Historical Society	Nevada State Museum
New Hampshire	New Hampshire Historical Society	New Hampshire Historical Society Museum
New Jersey	New Jersey Historical Society	New Jersey State Museum
New Mexico	Historical Society of New Mexico	New Mexico History Museum
New York	New-York Historical Society	New York State Museum
North Carolina	North Carolina State Historic Preservation Office	North Carolina Museum of History
North Dakota	State Historical Society of North Dakota	North Dakota Heritage Center
Ohio	Ohio History Connection	Ohio History Center
Oklahoma	Oklahoma Historical Society	Oklahoma History Center
Oregon	Oregon Historical Society	Oregon Historical Society Museum
Pennsylvania	Historical Society of Pennsylvania	State Museum of Pennsylvania
Rhode Island	Rhode Island Historical Society	Rhode Island Historical Society
South Carolina	South Carolina Historical Society	South Carolina State Museum
South Dakota	South Dakota State Historical Society	South Dakota State Historical Society
Tennessee	Tennessee Historical Commission	Tennessee State Museum
Texas	Texas State Historical Association	Bullock Texas State History Museum
Utah	Utah State Historical Society	Museum of Utah
Vermont	Vermont Historical Society	Vermont History Museum
Virginia	Virginia Historical Society	Virginia Museum of History and Culture
Washington	Washington State Historical Society	Washington State History Museum
West Virginia	West Virginia Division of Culture and History	West Virginia Culture Center and State Museum
Wisconsin	Wisconsin Historical Society	Wisconsin Historical Museum
Wyoming	Wyoming State Historical Society	Wyoming State Museum
District of Columbia	Historical Society of Washington, D.C.	None

=== Other state associations ===
- Missouri Historical Society
- New York State Historical Association

== Territorial societies ==
- Official Historian of Puerto Rico

== Federal District societies ==
- Cleveland Park Historical Society
- Historic Chevy Chase DC
- Historical Society of Washington, D.C.
- Jewish Historical Society of Greater Washington
- Sheridan Kalorama Historical Association
- Supreme Court Historical Society
- Tenleytown Historical Society
- United States Capitol Historical Society
- White House Historical Association

== County and local societies ==
=== Alabama ===
- Birmingham Historical Society
- Blount County Historical Society
- Bullock County Historical Society
- Cherokee County Historical Society
- Chilton County Historical Society
- Clarke County Historical Society
- Clay County Historical Society
- Crenshaw County Historical Society
- Elmore County Historical Society
- Escambia County Historical Society
- Fayette County Historical Society
- Greene County Historical Society
- Hale County Historical Society
- Lee County Historical Society
- Limestone County Historical Society
- Marengo County Historical Society
- Marion County Historical Society
- Mobile Historical Society
- Montgomery County Historical Society
- Randolph County Historical Society
- Russell County Historical Society
- Shelby County Historical Society
- Washington County Historical Society
- West Jefferson County Historical Society

=== Alaska ===
- Cook Inlet Historical Society
- Cooper Landing Historical Society
- Cordova Historical Society
- Eagle Historical Society
- Gastineau Channel Historical Society
- Hope and Sunrise Historical Society
- Kasilof Regional Historical Association
- Kenai Historical Society
- Kenai Peninsula Historical Association
- Kodiak Historical Society
- Matanuska Valley Historical Society
- Nome Historical Society
- Palmer Historical Society
- Port Alexander Historical Society
- Resurrection Bay Historical Society
- Salcha Historical Society
- Sitka Historical Society
- Soldotna Historical Society
- Tanana-Yukon Historical Society
- Tongass Historical Society
- Wasilla-Knik Historical Society

=== Arizona ===
- Apache County Historical Society
- Arizona Pioneers' Historical Society
- Gila County Historical Society
- Graham County Historical Society
- Maricopa County Historical Society
- Mohave County Historical Society
- Navaho County Historical Society
- Northern Gila County Historical Society
- Prescott Historical Society
- Yuma County Historical Society

=== Arkansas ===
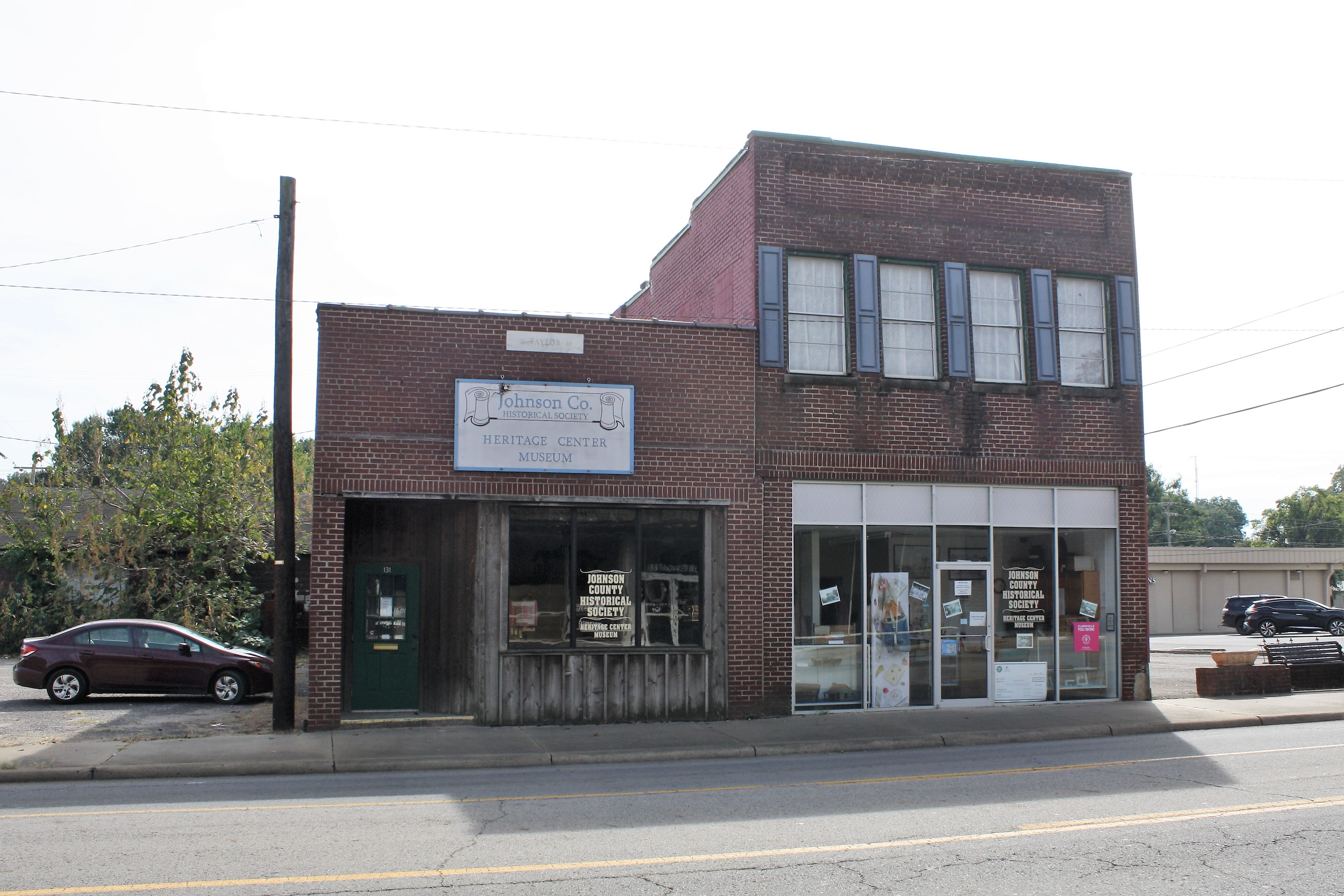
Johnson County Historical Society building in Clarksville, Arkansas (photo 2021)

- Benton County Historical Society
- Clark County Historical Association
- Cross County Historical Society
- Drew County Historical Society
- Faulkner County Historical Society
- Garland County Historical Society
- Glade Community Historical Society
- Johnson County Historical Society
- Ouachita County Historical Society
- Pope County Historical Association (formerly Arkansas Valley Historical Society)
- Pope County Historical Society
- Pulaski County Historical Society
- Saline County County History and Heritage Society
- Sharp County Historical Society
- Stone County Historical Society
- Washington County Historical Society, Arkansas
- White County Historical Society, Arkansas

=== Delaware ===
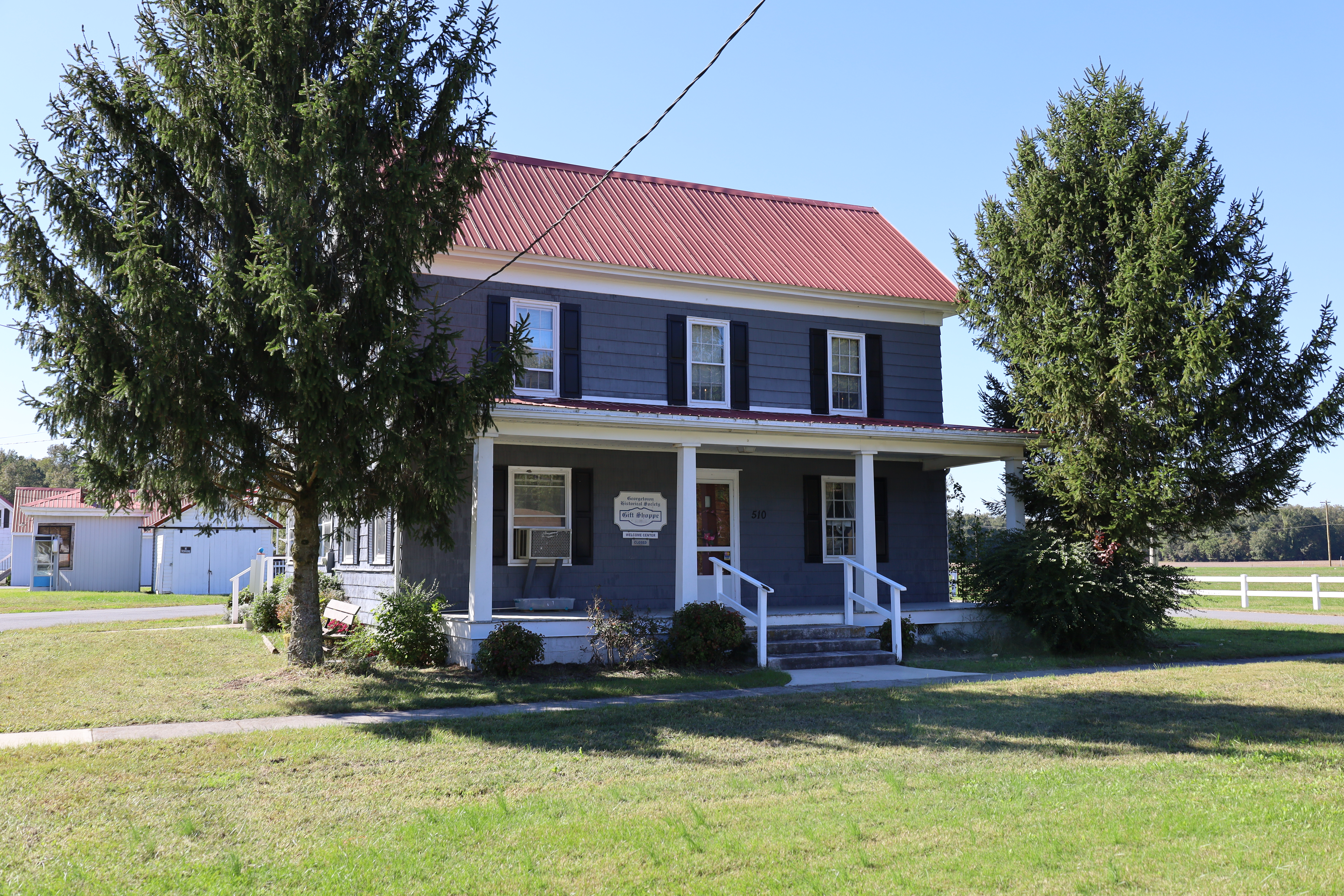
Georgetown Historical Society building in Delaware, US in 2020

- Georgetown Historical Society
- Laurel Historical Society
- Lewes Historical Society
- New Castle Historical Society
- Seaford Historical Society

=== Hawaii ===
- Kaua'i Historical Society
- Maui Historical Society
- Wahiawa Historical Society

=== Kentucky ===
- Adair County Historical Society
- Allen County Historical Society
- Anderson County Historical Society
- Barren County Historical Society
- Big Sandy Valley Historical Society
- Boone County Historical Society
- Boyle County Historical Society
- Clay County Historical Society
- Eastern Kentucky Historical Society
- Erlanger Historical Society
- Filson Historical Society
- Hart County Historical Society
- Henderson County Historical Society
- Kenton County Historical Society
- Kentucky Genealogical Society
- Lincoln County Historical Society
- Livingston County Historical Society
- Louisville Southern Historical Society
- Oldham County Historical Society
- Red River Historical Society
- Simpson County Historical Society
- Woodford County Historical Society

=== Mississippi ===
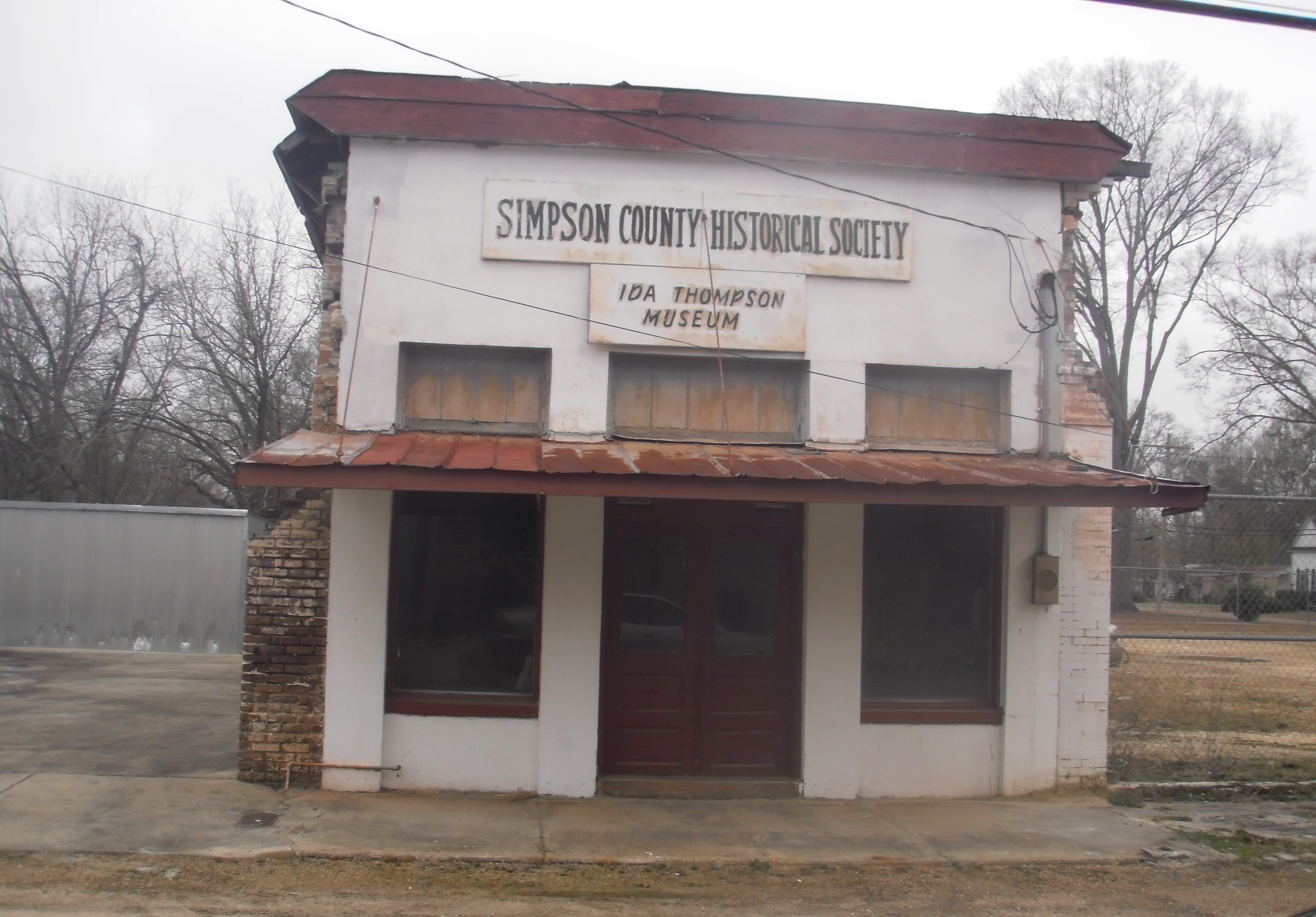
Simpson County Historical Society building in Mississippi (photo 2019)

- Biloxi Historical Society
- Bolivar County Historical Society
- Canton Madison County Historical Society
- Hancock County Historical Society
- Hattiesburg Area Historical Society
- Itawamba Historical Society
- Historical Society of Jackson County
- Kosciusdko Attala Historical Society
- Lawrence County Historical Society
- Lucedale George County Historical Society
- Marion County Historical Society
- Marshall County Historical Society
- Mississippi Methodist Historical Society
- Noxubee County Historical Society
- Pass Christian Historical Society
- Pontotoc County Historical Society
- Simpson County Historical and Genealogical Society
- South Tishomingo County Historical Society
- Tishomingo County Historical & Genealogical Society
- Union County Historical Society
- Vicksburg & Warren County Historical Society

=== Missouri ===
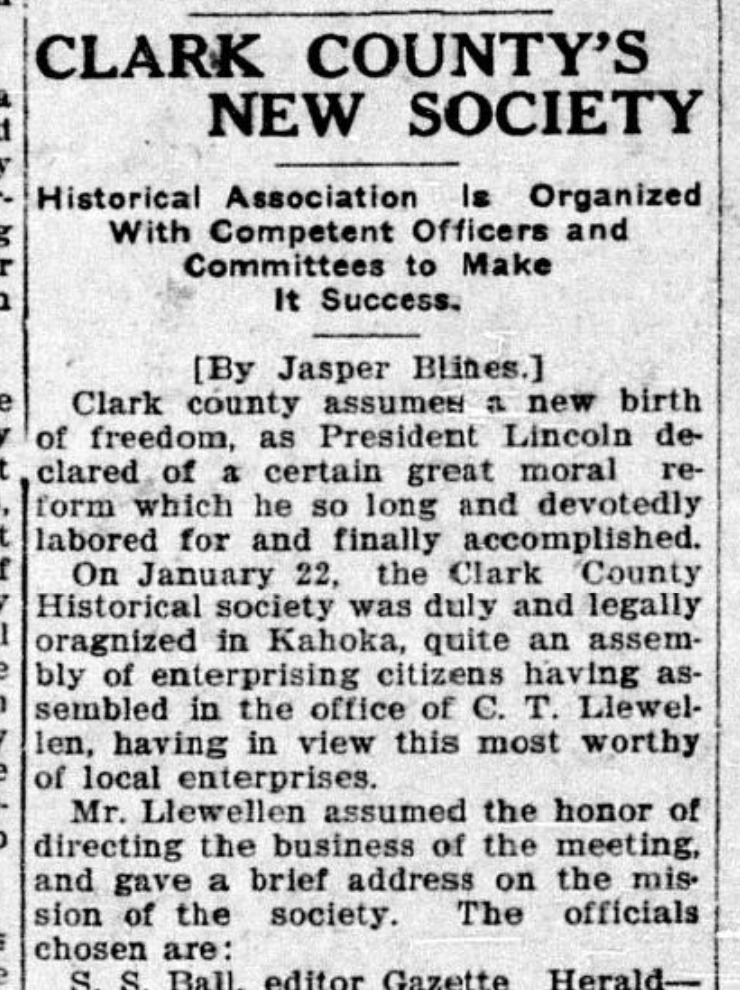
1920 newspaper item about the formation of the Clark County Historical Society, Missouri

- Adair County Historical Society
- Bates County Historical Society
- Boone County Historical Society
- Cape Girardeau County Historical Society
- Clark County Historical Society
- Grundy County Historical Society
- Holt County Historical Society
- Kimmswick Historical Society
- Miller County Historical Society
- Missouri Historical Society
- Monroe County Historical County
- Old Mines Area Historical Society
- Platte County Historical Society
- Raymore Historical Society
- Shelby County Historical Society
- Saint Charles County Historical Society
- St Louis County Historical Society
- Warren County Historical Society
- Washington Historical Society
- Webster Groves Historical Society
- Westport Historical Society
- Wildwood Historical Society

=== Montana ===
- Cascade County Historical Society
- Glacier County Historical Society
- Upper Swan Valley Historical Society

=== Nebraska ===
- Arthur County Historical Society
- Buffalo County Historical Society
- Douglas County Historical Society
- Landmarks Heritage Preservation Commission, Omaha
- Nuckolls County Historical Society
- Plains Historical Society and Museum, Kimball
- Washington County Historical Society

=== Nevada ===
- Austin Historical Society
- Carlin Historical Society
- Carson City Historical Society
- Douglas County Historical Society, Nevada
- Nevada Historical Society
- Northeastern Nevada Historical Society
- Virginia & Truckee Railroad Historical Society

=== New Mexico ===
- Albuquerque Historical Society
- Los Alamos Historical Society
- Los Vegas Historical Society
- Luna County Historical Society
- Historical Society for Southeast New Mexico - Roswell
- San Juan County Historical Society - San Juan County

=== North Dakota ===
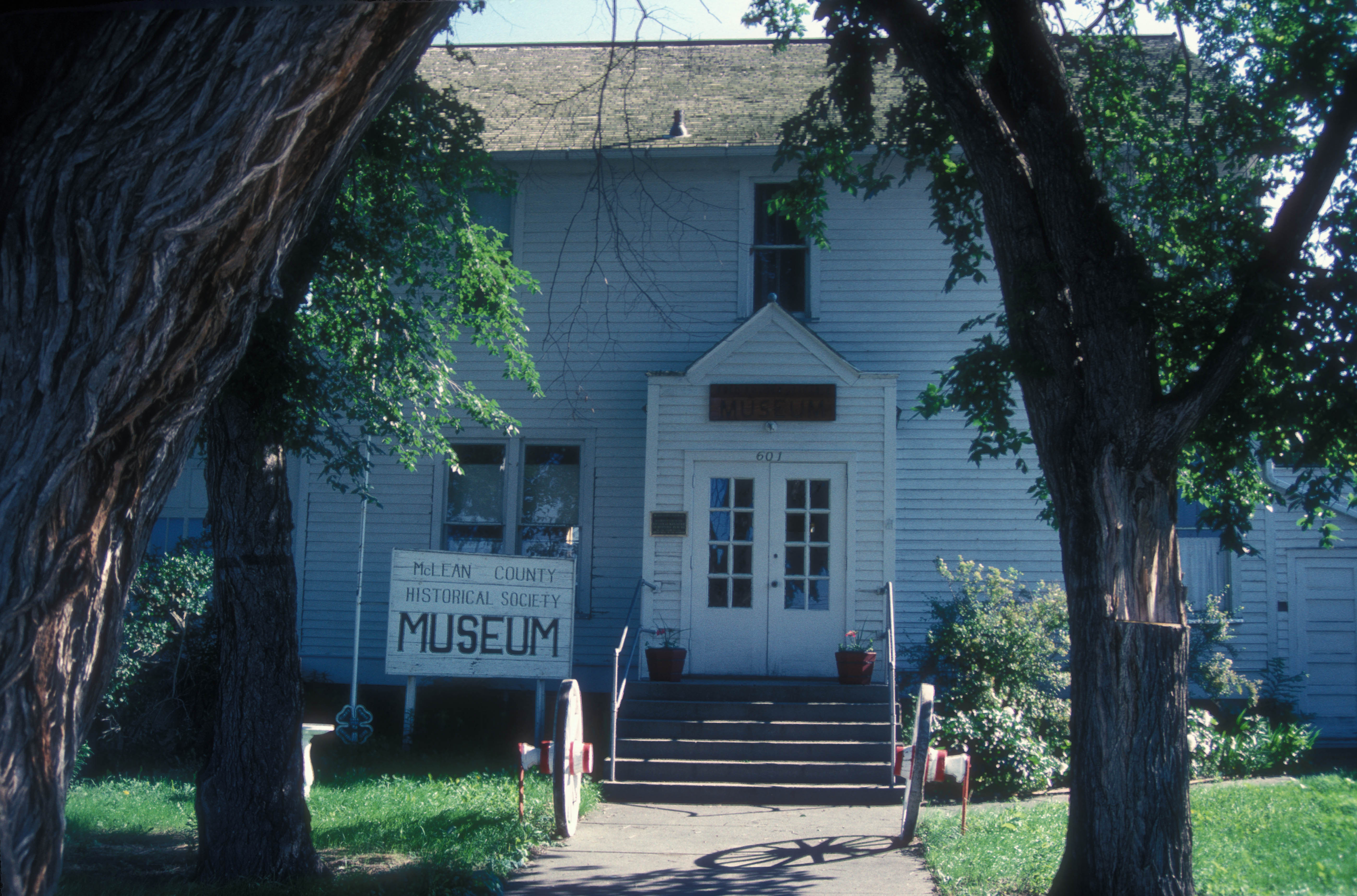
McLean County Historical Society museum building in Washburn, North Dakota (photo 2007)

- Bismarck Historical Society
- Cass County Historical Society
- Cavalier County Historical Society
- Dunn County Historical Society
- Emmons County Historical Society
- Garretson Area Historical Society
- Grand Forks County Historical Society
- McLean County Historical Society
- Missouri Valley Historical Society
- Ransom County Historical Society
- Richland County Historical Society
- Stark County Historical Society
- Steele County Historical Society
- Walsh County Historical Society
- Ward County Historical Society

=== Oklahoma ===
- Cherokee Strip Historical Society
- Cleveland County Historical Society
- Edmond Historical Society
- Garfield County Historical Society
- Grady County Historical Society
- Hooker Historical Society
- Keystone Crossroads Historical Society
- Logan County Historical Society
- No Man's Land Historical Society
- Oklahoma City/County Historical Society
- Payne County Historical Society
- Pontotoc County Historical Society
- Pottawatomie County Historical Society
- Rogers County Historical Society
- Sapulpa Historical Society
- Southwestern Oklahoma Historical Society
- Spencer Historical Society
- Tulsa Historical Society

=== Oregon ===
- Benton County Historical Society
- Clatsop County Historical Society
- Cottage Grove Historical Society
- Gresham Historical Society
- Josephine County Historical Society
- Lane County Historical Society
- Old Fort Dalles Historical Society
- Polk County Historical Society
- Portland Historical Society
- Sandy Historical Society
- Silverton Country Historical Society
- Southern Oregon Historical Society
- Tillamock County Pioneer Association
- Umatilla County Historical Society

=== South Dakota ===
- Brookings County Historical Society
- Codington County Historical Society
- Custer County Historical Society
- Lake County Historical Society
- Minnehaha County Historical Society
- Sully County Historical Society
- Union County Historical Society
- Yankton County Historical Society

=== Utah ===
- Alta Historical Society
- Cache Valley Historical Society
- Delta County Historical Society
- Draper Utah Historical Society
- Fort Harmony Historical Society
- Iron County Historical Society
- Lehi Historical Society and Archives
- Morgan County Historical Society
- Park City Historical Society
- Riverton Historical Society
- Smithfield Historical Society
- Summit County Historical Society
- Tooele County Historical Society
- Washington County Historical Society
- West Jordan Historical Society
- West Valley Historical Society

=== West Virginia ===
- Berkeley County Historical Society
- Doddridge County Historical Society
- Fayette County Historical Society
- Gilmer County Historical Society
- Hancock County Historical Society
- Hardy County Historical Society
- Jefferson County Historical Society
- Marion County Historical Society
- Marshall County Historical Society
- Mercer County Historical Society
- Mineral County Historical Society
- Monroe County Historical Society
- Pendleton County Historical Society
- Raleigh County Historical Society
- Randolph County Historical Society
- Ritchie County Historical Society
- Roane County Historical Society
- St. Albans Historical Society
- Summers County Historical Society
- Taylor County Historical & Genealogical Society
- Tucker County Historical Society
- Upshur County Historical Society
- Webster County Historical Society
- West Virginia Baptist Historical Society
- Wood County Historical & Preservation Society
- Wyoming County Historical Society

=== Wyoming ===
- Jackson Hole Historical Society
- Natrona County Historical Society
- Saratoga Historical & Cultural Association
- Sheridan County Historical Society
- Sublette County Historical Society

== See also ==
- American Association for State and Local History
- Family history societies in the US
- List of hereditary and lineage organizations in the United States
- List of historical societies
- List of learned societies in the United States
- List of subject matter-based historical societies in the United States
  - List of aviation historical societies in the United States
- List of time-period oriented societies in the United States
- Lists of newspapers in the US by state and territory
