= List of churches in the Roman Catholic Diocese of Reno =

This is a list of Roman Catholic parishes and mission churches in the Diocese of Reno in Northern Nevada in the United States.

Name	Image	Location	Description/notes
Corpus Christi		3597 N. Sunridge Dr, Carson City	
Holy Cross		5650 Vista Blvd, Sparks	
Holy Family		103 N. West Street, Yerington	
Holy Spirit Mission Church		95 US-395, New Washoe City	It used the Traditional Latin Mass, but was burnt down in the Davis Fire in September of 2024.
Our Lady of Perpetual Help		804 A St, Hawthorne	
Our Lady of the Snows		1138 Wright St, Reno	Founded in 1938, current church dedicated in 1939
Our Lady of Tahoe		1 Elks Point Rd, Zephyr Cove	Founded as mission in 1948, became parish in 1951, current church dedicated in 1972
Our Lady of Wisdom Newman Center		1101 N Virginia St, Reno	Serves the University of Nevada Reno community
Sacred Heart Mission Church		Olivarria St, McDermitt	
St. Albert the Great		1250 Wyoming Ave, Reno	Founded in 1948, current church dedicated that same year
St. Ann		3 Melanie Dr, Dayton	
St. Augustine Station Church		113 Virginia St, Austin	Constructed in 1866, it is the oldest Catholic church in Nevada.
St Francis of Assisi		701 Mt Rose Hwy, Incline Village	
St. Gall		1343 Centerville Lane, Gardnerville	Founded as mission in 1918, became parish in 1940, current church dedicated in the 1980s
Saint John Baptist Mission Church		Smith Valley	
St. John Bosco		384 S. Reese St, Battle Mountain	
St. John the Baptist		1045 Franklin Ave, Lovelock	
St Joseph Parish		St. Joseph Church, 990 Highland Dr, Elko	
		St Brendan Church, 70 O'Neil St, Eureka	Supervised by St. Joseph Parish
		Sacred Heart Parish, 562 4th St, Carlin	Supervised by St. Joseph Parish
		Our Lady of the Rubies Chapel, 1201 Silver State Drive, Spring Creek	Supervised by St. Joseph Parish
		Our Lady of Guadalupe Mission Church, 2555 Progressive Dr, Jackpot	Supervised by St. Joseph Parish
		St. Thomas Aquinas Church, 619 6th St, Wells	Supervised by St. Joseph Parish
St. Mary in the Mountains		111 E St, Virginia City	Founded in 1860s, current church dedicated in 1870
St. Michael		14075 Mount Vida St, Reno	
St Patrick		850 W. 4th Street, Fallon	
St. Paul		350 Melarkey St, Winnemucca	Church constructed in 1924
St. Peter Canisius		225 E. Fifth Ave, Sun Valley	Current church dedicated in the 1950s, parish founded in 1970
St. Robert Bellarmine		625 Desert Shadows Lane, Fernley	Founded as a mission in 1957, became parish in 1960. Current church dedicated in 2011
		St. Joseph the Worker Mission Church, 625 Desert Shadows Lane, Fernley	Supervised by St. Robert Bellarmine Parish
St Rose of Lima		100 Bishop Manogue Dr, Reno	Founded in 1996, current church dedicated in 2003
St. Teresa of Avila		3000 N. Lompa Lane, Carson City	Founded in the 1850s, current church dedicated in 2001
St. Therese the Little Flower		875 E. Plumb Lane, Reno	Founded in 1948
St. Thomas Aquinas Cathedral		310 W. 2nd St, Reno	Current church dedicated in 1906, became a cathedral in 1931
