= Reuel Colt Gridley =

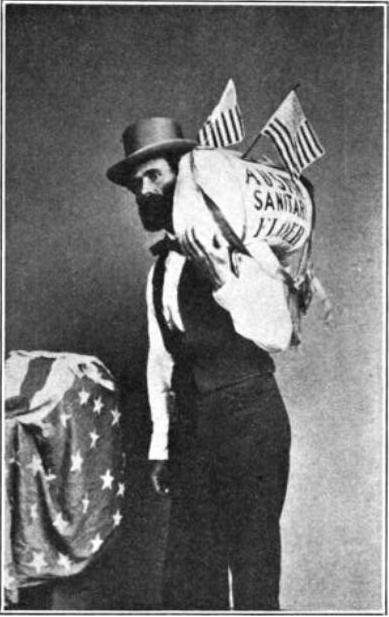
- Gridley with his sack of flour in 1864
- Born: January 23, 1829
- Died: November 24, 1870 (aged 41); Stockton, California

Reuel Colt Gridley Monument
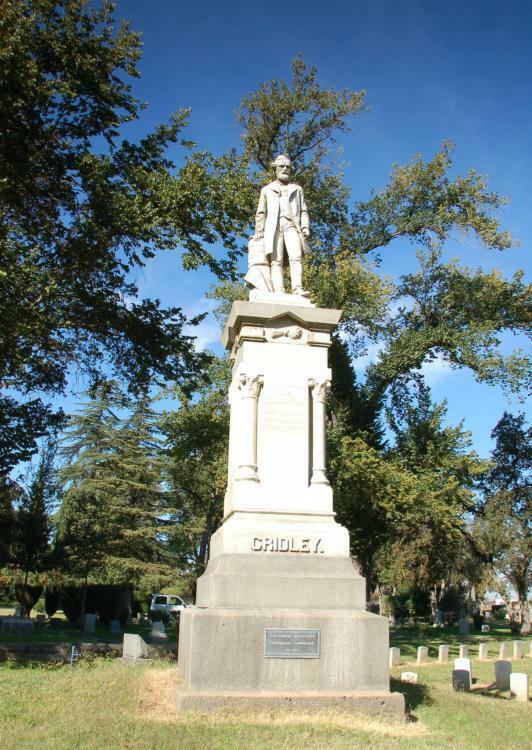
- Reuel Colt Gridley Monument

- Location within California Location within the United States
- 37.977400°N 121.286400°W
- Location: Stockton Rural Cemetery

California Historical Landmark
- Reference no.: 801

Reuel Colt Gridley (January 23, 1829 – November 24, 1870) was an American storekeeper who gained nationwide attention in 1864, when he repeatedly auctioned a plain sack of flour and raised over US$250,000 (equivalent to $5,146,000 in 2025) for the United States Sanitary Commission, which provided aid to wounded American Civil War soldiers.

== Background ==
Gridley went to school in Hannibal, Missouri, where he befriended Mark Twain. He later fought in the Mexican–American War.

In 1864, Gridley supported the Democratic candidate for mayor in Austin, Nevada, where he operated a grocery store. He made a bet with a Republican friend that the loser would carry a fifty-pound sack of flour through the town. He performed his punishment with the accompaniment of the town band, and at the end someone offered that the sack should be auctioned off to raise money for the Sanitary Fund, a new organization that aided disabled Civil War veterans. After finally selling for $250, the winning bidder did not take the sack, but donated it back to Gridley to be auctioned off again. It was auctioned repeatedly until over $8,000 was raised. When nearby Virginia City, Nevada heard of the event (and where young newspaper editor Mark Twain was working at the time), they invited Gridley to come there, which he did. He then traveled to California where San Franciscans donated $2800 and Sacramento citizens donated $10000, before heading to St. Louis and the major eastern cities. These bidders added around $170,000 to the Sanitary Commission's fund, and within twelve months Gridley had more than $250,000 with his sack of flour.

Twain told the story of the Gridley flour sack in his 1872 book Roughing It.

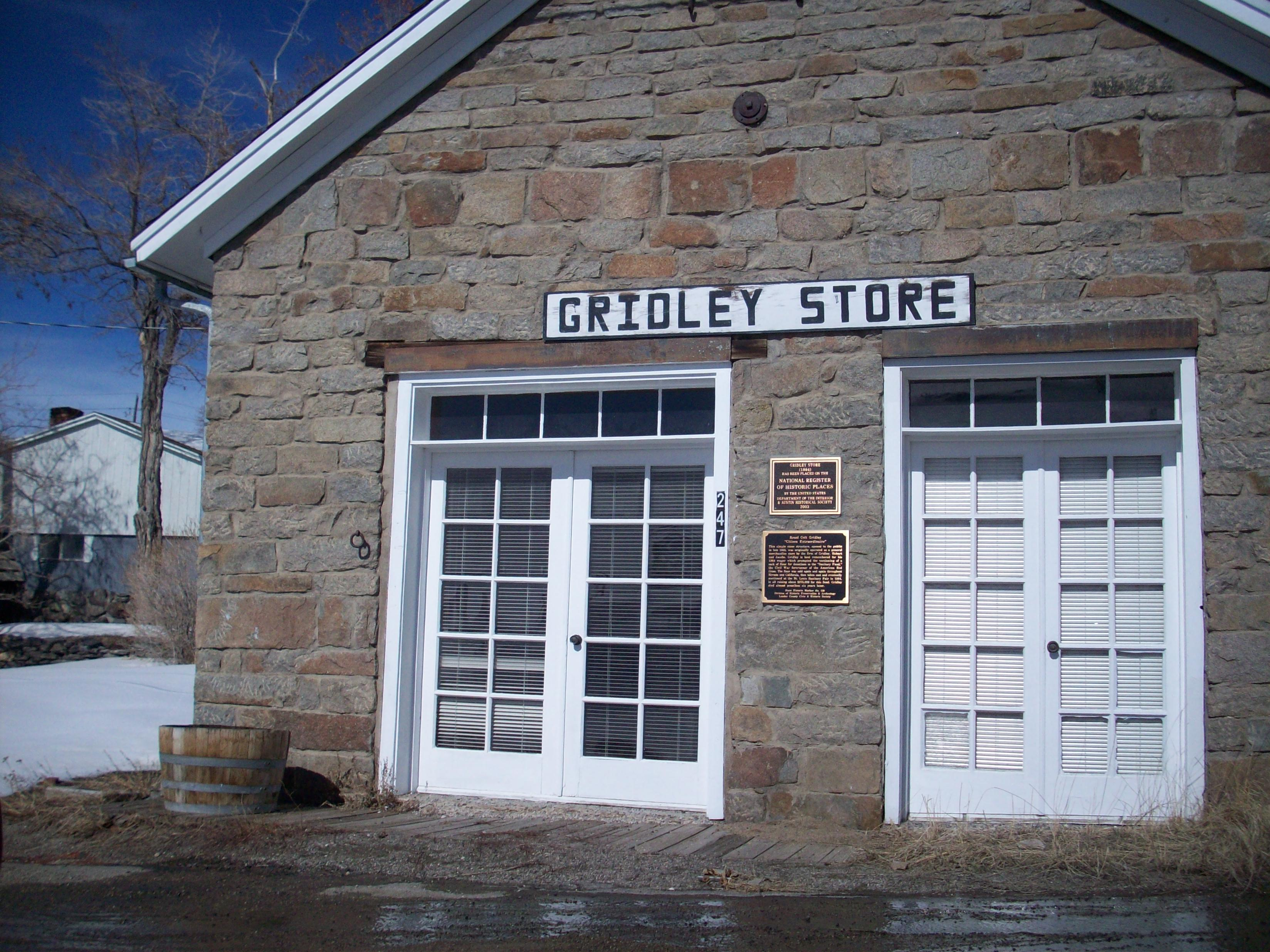
The Gridley Store in Austin, Nevada, which was placed on National Register of Historic Places listings in Nevada in 2003

In 1866, Gridley moved to Stockton, California, and was in poor health; he died in 1870.

== Legacy ==
In Austin, Gridley's store still stands and was placed on the National Register of Historic Places in 2003.

In 1887, the "Reuel Colt Gridley Monument" was dedicated in Stockton's Rural Cemetery, depicting Gridley standing next to a large sack of flour. In 1965, the monument was registered as a historical landmark by the state of California.
