= St. George's Episcopal Church (Austin, Nevada) =

Historic church in Nevada, United States

- U.S. National Register of Historic Places
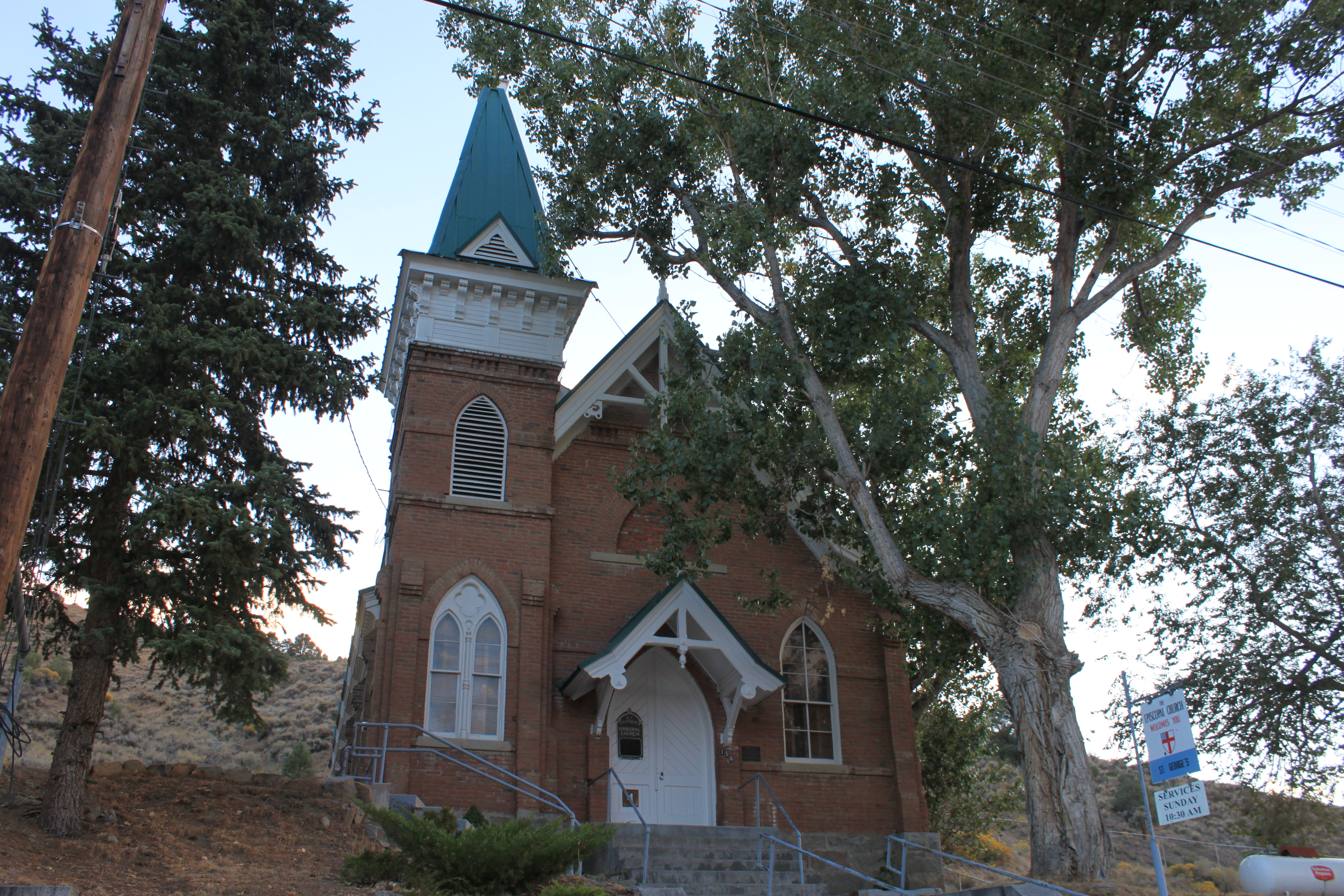

- Location within Nevada Location within the United States
- Location: 156 Main St., Austin, Nevada
- Coordinates: 39°29′28″N 117°4′7″W
- Area: 0.2 acres (0.081 ha)
- Built: 1877-78
- Architect: Finnegan, Michael; et al.
- Architectural style: Gothic Revival
- NRHP reference No.: 03000755
- Added to NRHP: August 14, 2003

The St. George's Episcopal Church in Austin, Nevada, United States, located at 156 Main St., is a historic Gothic Revival-style church built during 1877–78. It was listed on the National Register of Historic Places in 2003.

It is a one-story brick building, with the bricks laid in American bond, with lancet arch windows, set on a terrace in Pony Canyon, with a corner bell tower dominating. It was reportedly designed by a San Francisco architect, and built by local contractor Michael Finnegan with mason John C. Wholey. It is significant as "one of Austin, Nevada's most stylish nineteenth century buildings", and as the only historic church in Austin that was still, in 2003, in use by its original denomination.
