= Feed sack dress =

Women's dress made from cotton sacks

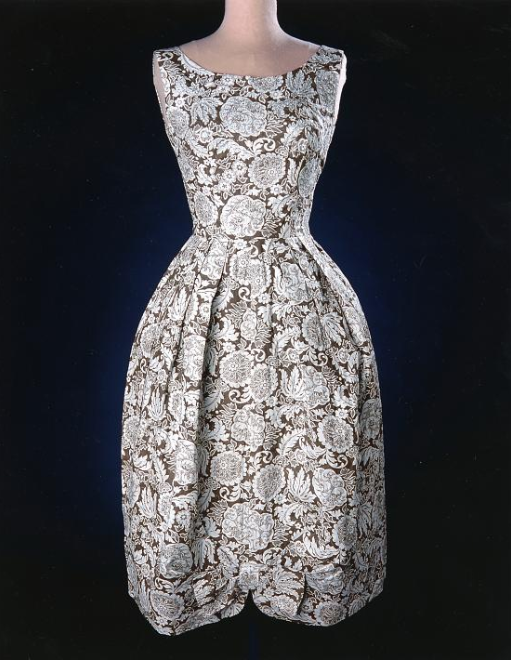
Feedsack dress made by Dorothy Overall of Caldwell, Kansas, in 1959 for the Cotton Bag Sewing Contest sponsored by the National Cotton Council and the Textile Bag Manufacturers Association, now in the collection of the Smithsonian

Feed sack dresses, flour sack dresses, or feedsack dresses were a common article of clothing in rural US and Canadian communities from the late 19th century through the mid-20th century. They were made at home, usually by women, using the cotton sacks in which flour, sugar, animal feed, seeds, and other commodities were packaged, shipped, and sold. They became an iconic part of rural life from the 1920s through the Great Depression, World War II, and post-World War II years.

== History of feed sacks ==
The first use of fabric sacks can be traced to the early 19th century, when small farmers strapped a sack to the back of a horse to take their grain for milling. The bags of the time were hand-sewn at home from rough cloth made of hand-spun yarn, sometimes stamped with the name of the farmer.

By the middle of the 19th century in the US and Canada, the invention of the sewing machine and advances in technology for spinning and weaving changed the economies of shipping commodities such as animal feeds, seeds, sugar and flour; it became more cost-effective to package and ship in sacks rather than in barrels, which was what had been previously used. A barrel held 196 pounds (89 kg) of flour, and the first commercial feed sacks were sized to hold fractions of that amount. The first commercially produced sacks were made in the late 1800s of osnaburg, a coarse white or brown cotton, and were stamped with a logo or label, and burlap.

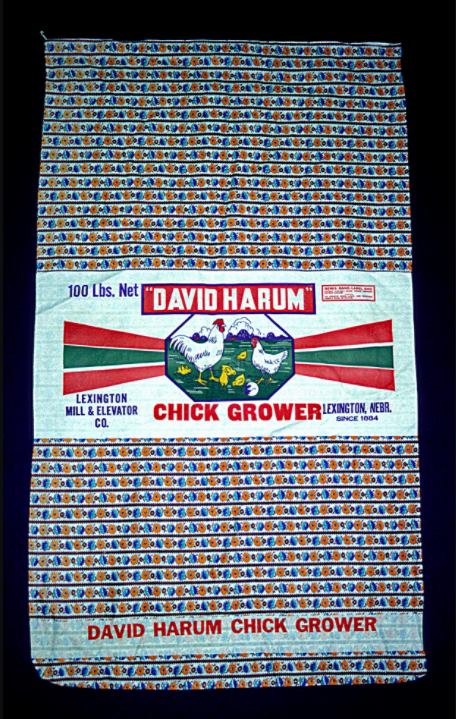
Feed sack

During World War I, US and Canadian flour in sacks was sent to the neutral Netherlands for distribution in Europe. In October 1924 Asa T. Bales, a millworker from Missouri, filed a patent for "a sack, the cloth of which is adapted to be used for dress goods after the product has been removed or consumed." Bales assigned the patent to the George P. Plant Milling Company of St. Louis, Missouri, which by 1925 were manufacturing Gingham Girl sacks.

In 1925 the Textile Bag Manufacturers Association was created to increase industry sales. Working with the Millers National Federation it encouraged home sewing projects using feed sacks. In 1933 the US Department of Agriculture described the bags in a booklet as having "a high salvage value."

Sacks were eventually produced in sizes of 49, 24, 12, 6, 2 lb (22.2, 10.9, 5.4, 2.7, 0.9 kg), and during World War II sizes were standardized to 100, 50, 25, 10, 2 lb (45, 23, 11, 5, 1 kg) to aid the war effort by eliminating waste and making it easier for millers and housewives to estimate required material.

During World War II, dressmaking-quality fabrics became in short supply as textile manufacturers produced for war efforts, and cotton yard goods were rationed. but feed sacks were considered part of the "industrial" category of uses, so feed sacks were still available. Recycling of them was encouraged by the US government. According to the Textile Research Center's Willem Vogelsang, "A bag that contained 5 lb (2.3 kg) of sugar, for example, provided 1 ft (30 cm) of cloth, while a 100 lb (45 kg) bag provided slightly more than 1 yd (91 cm) of material, with four sacks providing enough for one adult woman’s dress."

At the industry's peak, 1,300,000,000 yards (1,200,000 km) of cotton fabric were used in commodity bags, in 1946 accounting for 8.0% of the cotton goods production and 4.5% of total cotton consumption in the US.

After World War II, use of cloth sacks for packaging declined and was replaced with less expensive paper. Most feed sack production ceased by the early 1960s.

== Feed sack garments ==
As early as 1890 the first osnaburg sacks were recycled on farms to be used as toweling, rags, or other functional uses on farms. A paragraph in a short story in an 1892 issue of Arthurs Home Magazine said, "So, that is the secret of how baby looked so lovely in her flour sack: just a little care, patience and ingenuity on the mother's part."

By the beginning of the 20th century, flour sacks were produced in a variety of fabrics of tighter weave such as percale and sheeting and often printed in various colors and designs, and recycled for clothing and other purposes. Farm women recycled the sacks into clothing, and by 1925 the George P. Plant Milling Company of St. Louis produced Gingham Girl flour packaged in dress-quality red-and-white checked yarn-dyed fabric and used the sacks as a selling point. By the end of the decade Bemis Brothers in Tennessee, Fulton Bag & Cotton Mills in Georgia, and Percy Kent of Buffalo, New York, were producing decorative sacks.

Several educational institutions taught classes in how to use feed sacks, including The Household Science Institute, which produced a monthly newsletter called Out of the Bag and a series of booklets called Sewing with Cotton Bags, which gave instructions on how to use feed sacks.

During the Great Depression the popularity of the sacks increased, as they were seen as a source of free garment-making material for impoverished families. Groups of women would get together to trade the sacks and itinerant peddlers bought and sold the empty sacks.

Another driver of this recycling trend was, unexpectedly, the flour millers themselves. As the Great Depression intensified, they looked for ways to save costs. One significant costs was the cotton bag itself. Because they were sturdy, cotton bags could be easily cleaned and reused, so flour manufacturers began offering incentives to return the bags for refilling. Bag manufacturers responded to this potential reduction in their business by focusing on patterns and colors that would encourage the end buyer to turn the bag into clothing, curtains, tablecloths, and toys.

By the 1930s companies regarded the sacks as a crucial part of marketing product. By 1936 the Staley Milling Company of Kansas City, Missouri, was marketing "Tint-sax" in pastel shades.

The use of the sacks in garments meant brand decisions were often being made by women rather than men. One feed store owner complained about purchase decisions moving from the farmer to the farmwife, saying, "Years ago they used to ask for all sorts of feeds, special brands... now they come over and ask me if I have an egg mash in a flowered percale. It ain't natural." Finding bags that matched was important as many patterns required more than a single sack. Families sometimes saved sacks and traded with neighbors to get sufficient sacks in a particular print. Mary Derrick Chaney, writing in 1997 in the Christian Science Monitor, recalled that the feed sacks were coarser than the flour sacks, but it was difficult to get enough flour sacks in the same pattern to make a dress. A 100-pound (45 kg) bag of chicken feed provided a 36 in × 44 in (910 mm × 1,120 mm) piece of fabric, slightly more than a square yard.

According to Margaret Powell, speaking at the Textile Society of America's 2012 symposium:

In 1927, three yards of dress print cotton percale (the typical amount of fabric needed for an average size adult dress) could cost sixty cents when purchased from the Sears and Roebuck catalog. Three yards of gingham dress goods could cost forty cents. In comparison, three yards of dress quality gingham used in Gingham Girl Flour sacks from the George P. Plant Milling Company could be salvaged after the use of two or three one hundred pound bags of flour.

— Margaret Powell

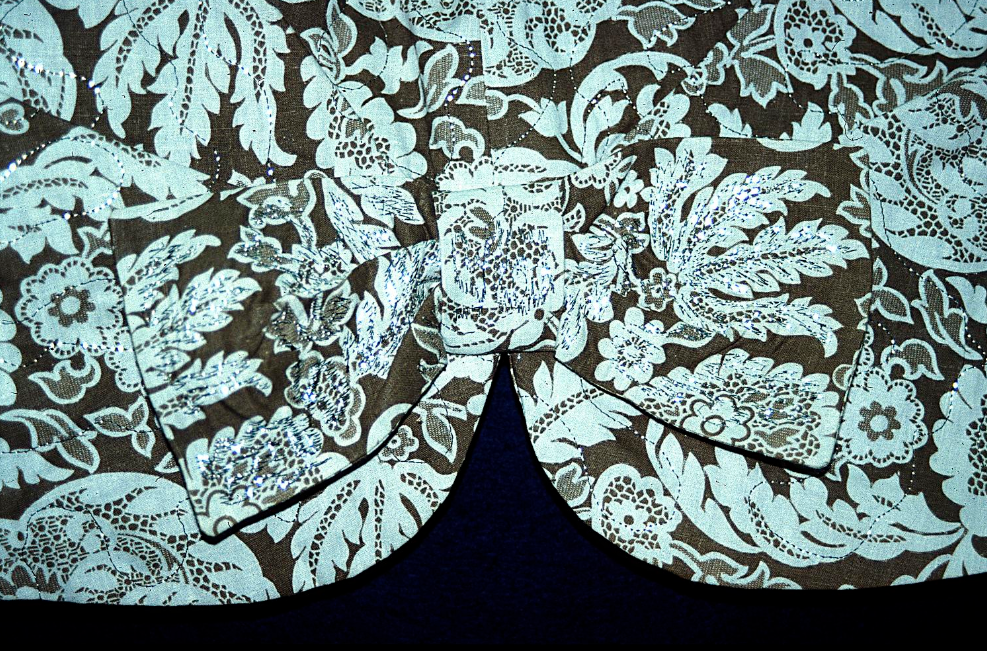
Closeup of hem detail of feedsack dress

Related industries developed, such as the printing of booklets with instructions on how to create garments and other household items from the sacks and specifying how many sacks of a certain size were needed for a particular item and patterns specifically designed to utilize feed sacks. Patterns were published in magazines and newspapers serving rural communities. In 1933 the Textile Bag Manufacturers Association published a booklet, Sewing with Cotton Bags, which provided instructions on how to get company logos out of sacks by soaking the inked area in lard or kerosene overnight. By the late 1930s most companies were using water-soluble ink or paper labels which could be soaked off.

Fashion historian Kendra Brandes found that "as an element of material culture, the clothing and clothing practices of rural populations reflect the life and times of the era to the same extent as that of the general population. However, it is the activities of these farm wives, clothing their families in feed sacks, that offer a view of life that was unique to rural communities during this time period." As garments wore out, they were often recycled again into quilts, rugs, and cleaning rags.

During World War II, as textile shortages limited production of both commercially made garments and the retail yardage to make garments at home, feed sacks were still available. Using them to make clothing and other household items was regarded as patriotic and thrifty.

After World War II, as many manufacturers switched to cheaper paper package, the National Cotton Council and the Textile Bag Manufacturers Association worked with patternmakers McCalls and Simplicity to promote demand for feed sacks. They sponsored design competitions and fashion shows, plus sewing contests in every state to find the National Cotton Bag Sewing Queen, and hired prominent textile designers to create their prints to prop up demand.

Several people from rural Virginia spoke about their clothes made from sacks during the Depression. "Back then, feed was sold in sacks. I believe they held almost 100 pounds of seeds. A number of farmers who didn't sew returned the sacks for resale... I actually made hair bows, pants and dresses from the sacks." "Mama always sewed on a Singer treadle sewing machine and made our dresses from flour sacks. She made sure Dad would get two sacks just alike. That was what the pattern took to make the dresses right." "Mama made me pinafores out of flour sacks. Flour sacks were made of cotton with pretty prints." "Dresses made for my sister and me were sometimes made out of cotton feed bags (I guess my brothers were lucky)." "My mother made shirts out of feed sacks, which a lot of cow feed, came in."

A study by fashion historian Jennifer Lynn Banning analyzing 37 garments made between 1949 and 1968 by one Louisiana farmwife found that the garments and textiles were similar to those being shown contemporaneously in Good Housekeeping magazine to its middle-class reading audience and "had many of the same fashion features as mass produced garments that could be purchased in department stores nationwide". The garments are held in the collection of the Louisiana State University Textile and Costume Museum.

The fabric and bags have variously been referred to as feed sacks, flour sacks, commodity bags, and chicken linen.

== Cultural impact ==
During World War II, it was estimated that 3 million women and children in the United States were wearing feed sack clothing at any given point in time. One participant in an oral history project stated that "everything on the clothesline was from feed sacks." The US Department of Agriculture reported in 1951 that 75% of mothers living in urban areas and 97% of those living in rural areas had heard of making garments from feed sacks.

There was an element of shame experienced by those dressed in flour sack clothing, as it was seen as a mark of poverty, so efforts were often made to hide the fact the clothing was made from feed sacks, such as soaking off logos, dying the fabric, or adding trim. Mary Derrick Chaney, writing in the Christian Science Monitor, recalled:

Even before prestigious labels ever appeared on jeans and blouses for ordinary little girls, the origins of clothes were a status symbol. In the rural South, mothers and daughters drew the battle lines not between name brands, but between "homemade" and "ready made." These were only skirmishes, however. The real conflicts arose when the material happened to come, not from the fabric store, but from the feed store. I was about 8 when my rebellion began.

— Mary Derrick Chaney

According to the Smithsonian, "With feed sacks and flour bags, farmwomen took thriftiness to new heights of creativity, transforming the humble bags into dresses, underwear, towels, curtains, quilts, and other household necessities." According to Brandes, feed sack fashion was a reflection of rural culture in the first half of the 20th century.

Brandes notes that fashion history has largely been written without including the fashion of rural communities. She called the feed sack garments part of the "cultural heritage of rural America." Banning notes that 20th-century costume history "has traditionally focused on fashion designers and the styles they created," resulting in a "top-rail bias," defined as history written from the perspective of the upper class.
