= Lander County Courthouse =

- U.S. National Register of Historic Places
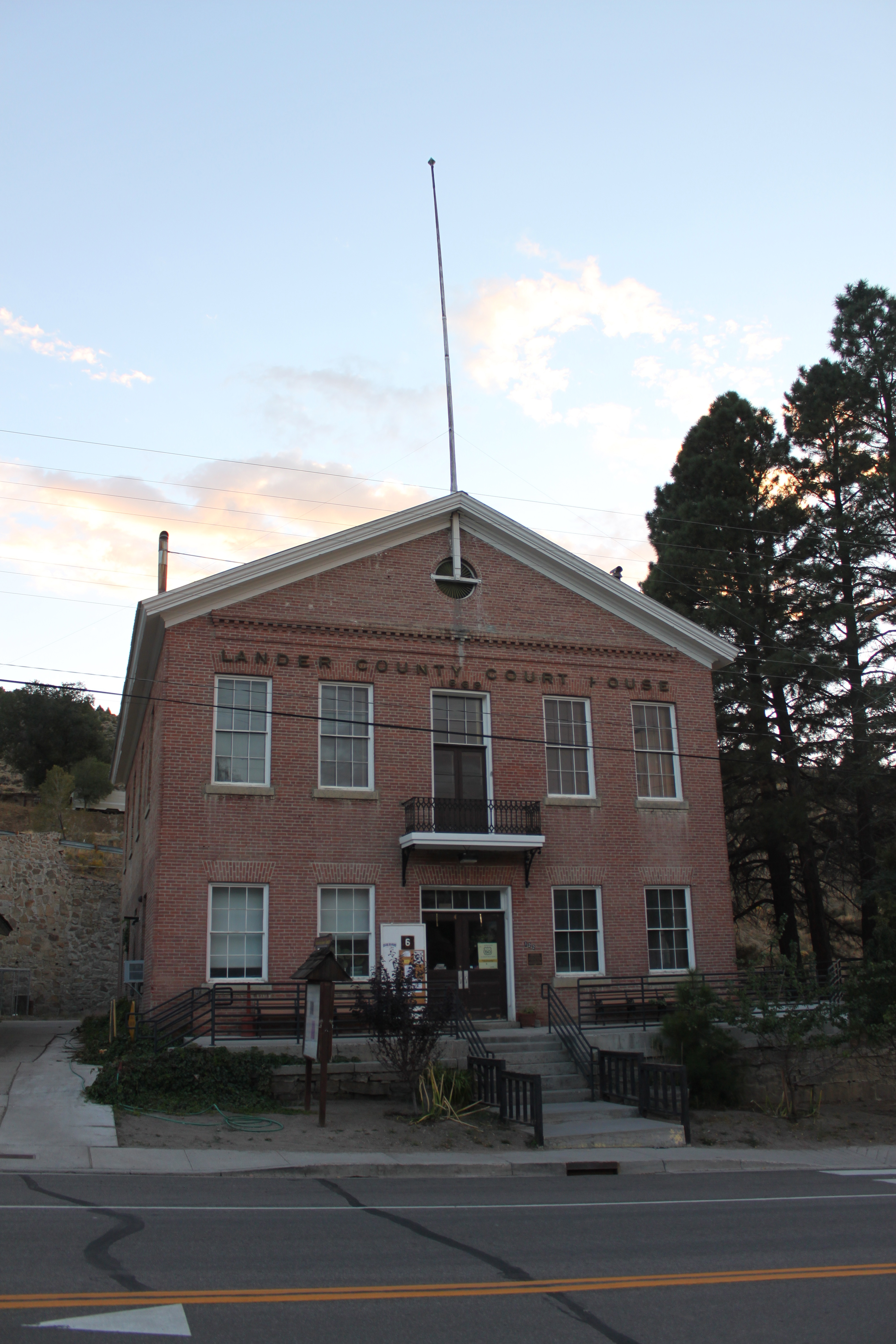

- Location within Nevada Location within the United States
- Location: 122 Main St., Austin, Nevada
- Coordinates: 39°29′31″N 117°4′11″W
- Area: 0.2 acres (0.081 ha)
- Built: 1871
- Architect: Bell, Daniel P.; et al.
- Architectural style: Greek Revival
- NRHP reference No.: 03000750
- Added to NRHP: August 14, 2003

The Lander County Courthouse, at 122 Main St. in Austin, Nevada, is a historic courthouse that was built of brick in 1871 with Greek Revival influence in its style. It was designed by Daniel P. Bell. It was listed on the National Register of Historic Places in 2003.

It served as courthouse from 1871 to 1979, when the court moved to a courthouse in Battle Mountain, and the building has since been used as county offices.
