= Austin Methodist Church =

Historic church in Nevada, United States

- U.S. National Register of Historic Places
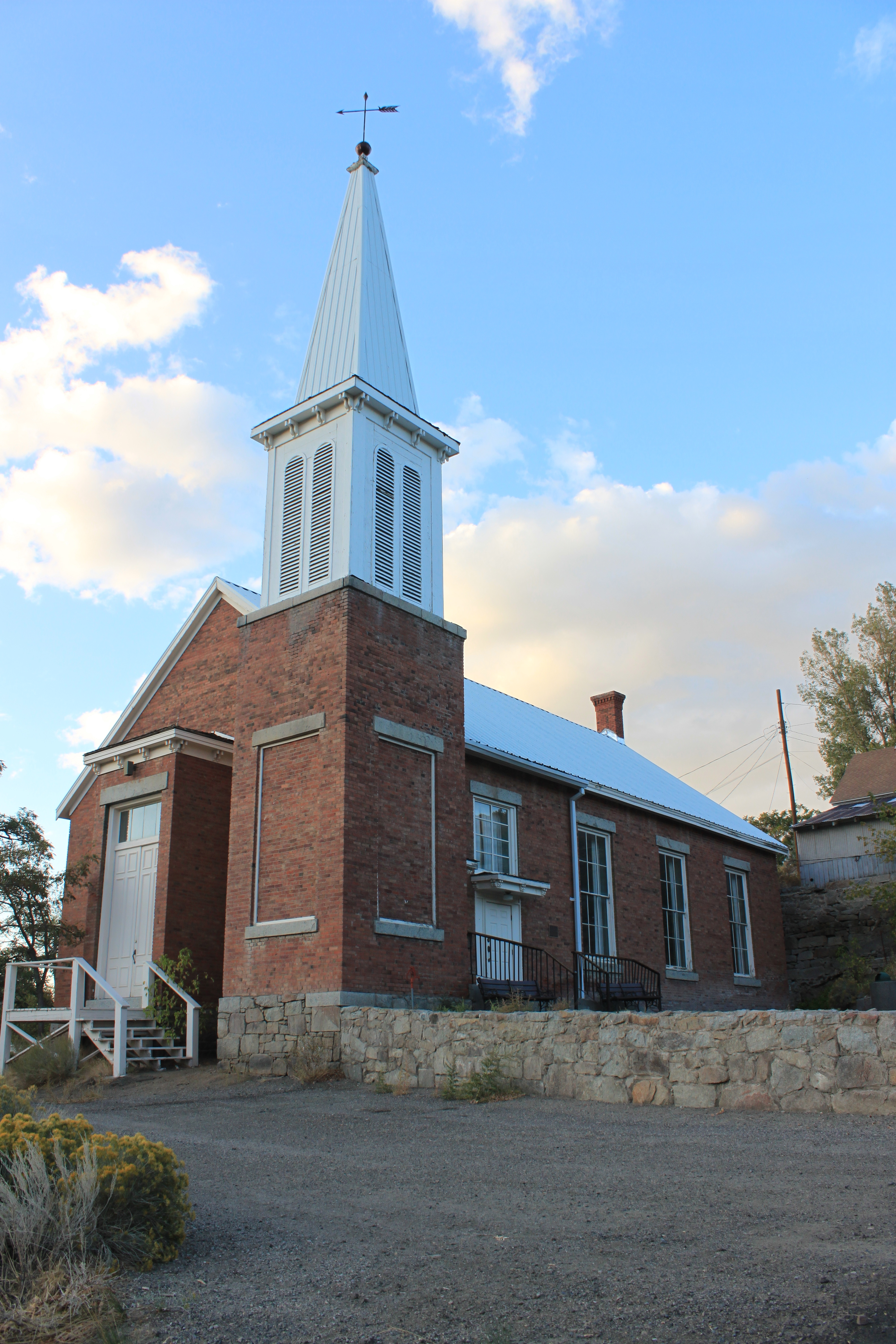

- Location within Nevada Location within the United States
- Location: 135 Court St., Austin, Nevada
- Coordinates: 39°29′32″N 117°4′6″W
- Area: 0.1 acres (0.040 ha)
- Built: 1866
- Architect: Bell, Daniel P.; McGinnis & Cronin
- Architectural style: Italianate
- NRHP reference No.: 03000751
- Added to NRHP: August 14, 2003

Austin Methodist Church is a historic church at 135 Court Street in Austin, Nevada. The Italianate church building was constructed in 1866 and was added to the National Register of Historic Places in 2003.

It was dedicated on September 23, 1866, at which time a newspaper asserted this was "'the inauguration of the first edifice dedicated to Christian worship in the American desert.'"
