= Flour sack =

Bag used to store flour or feed

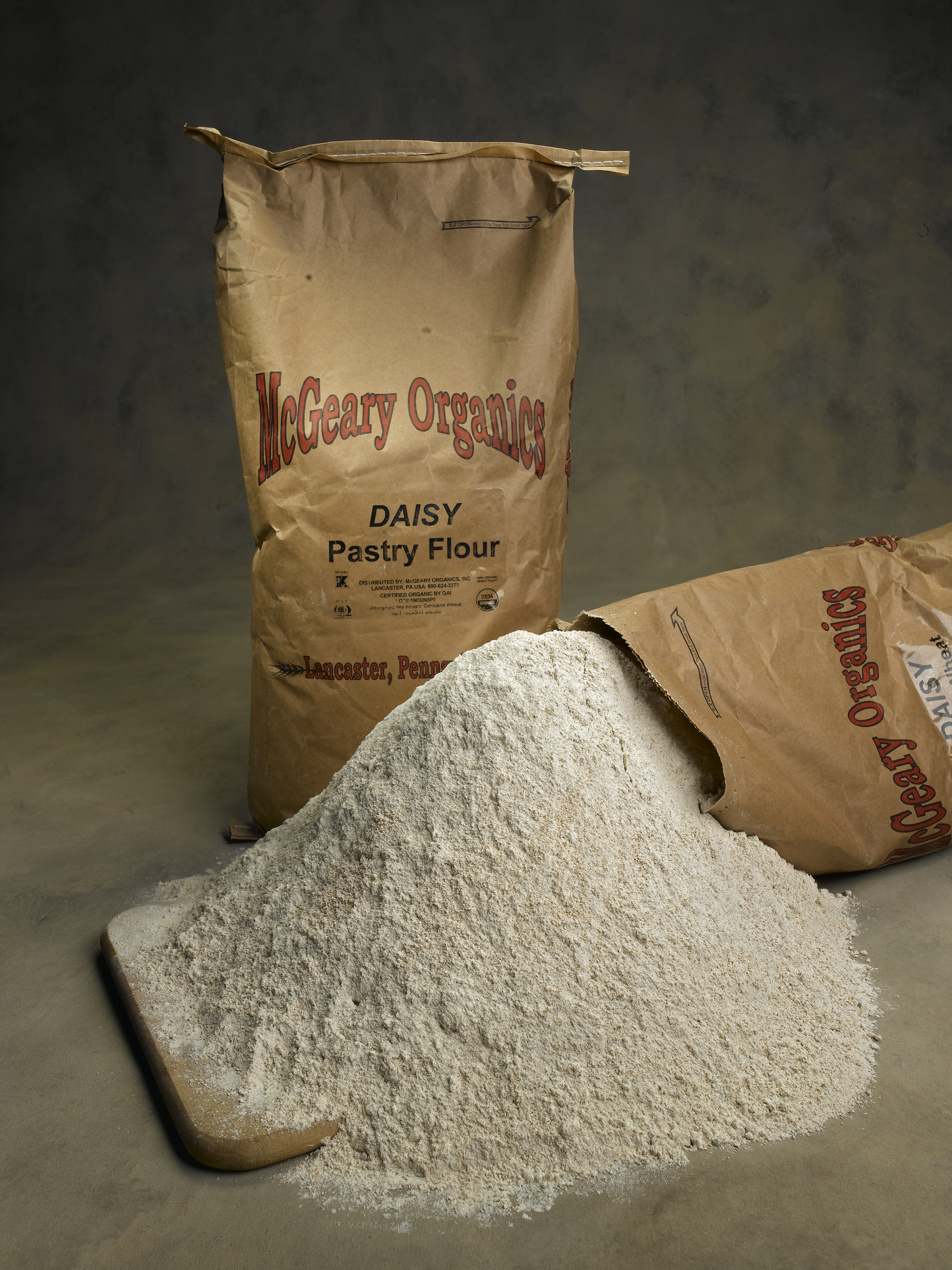
open multi-wall paper sack of flour

Bags or sacks for flour range in size and material, from large bulk bags, in cotton or woven polypropylene, to smaller consumer packaging, often made of paper.

== Package types ==
=== Bulk packaging ===
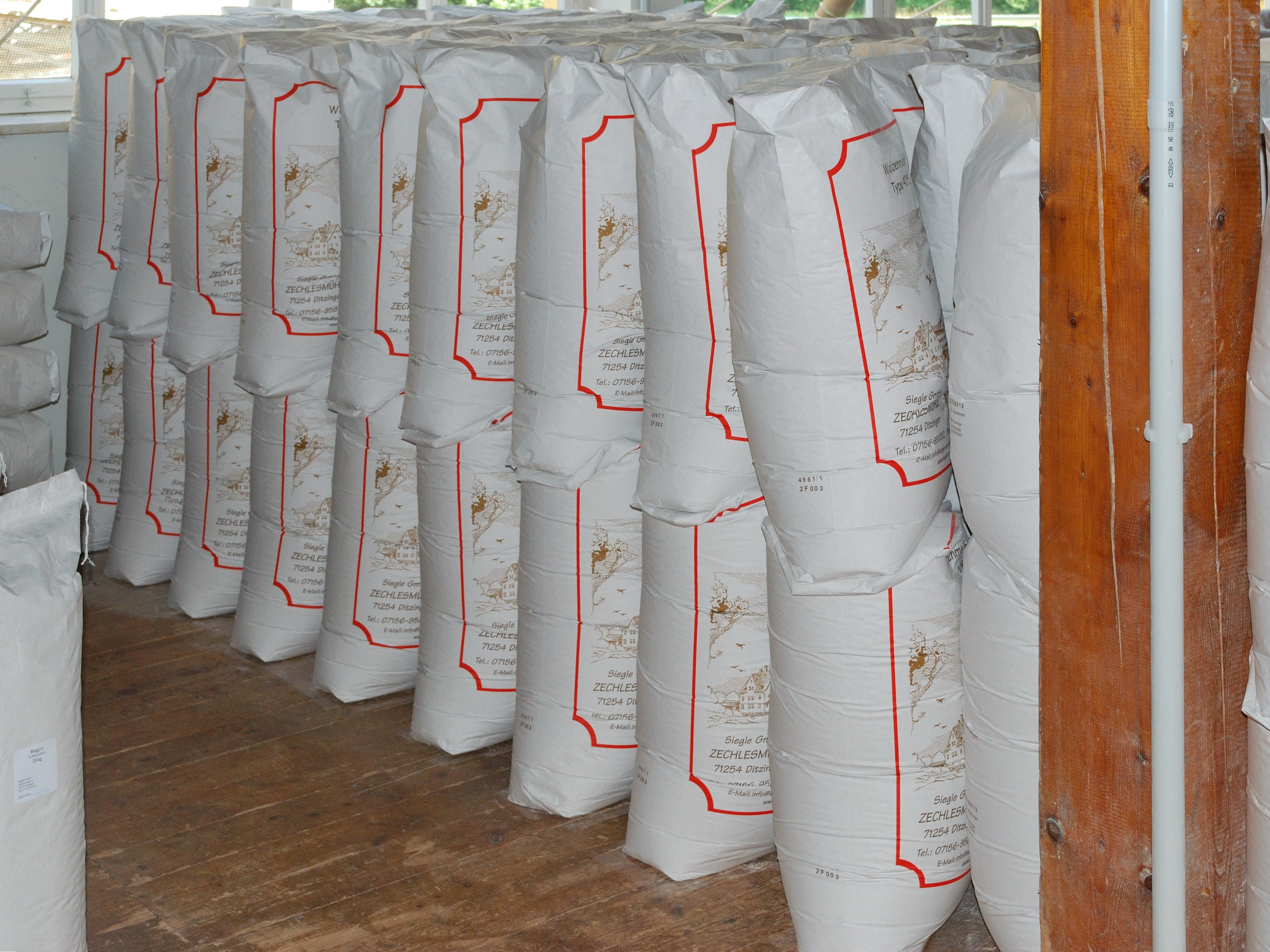
40 kg. multi-wall paper sacks of flour

Flour is often shipped from the miller to bakeries, institutions, and other bulk uses. Sizes range from 10 kg to 100 kg. One traditional construction was cheap cotton bags. These printed cotton bags were sometimes viewed as collectables; other times the flour sack fabric was repurposed into a variety of household items.

Current practices are to use multi-wall paper sacks. Some include a layer of plastic film for barrier properties and insect control. Woven polypropylene bags are also used for high strength; at least one variety (Purdue Improved Crop Storage bags) also includes inner plastic bags.

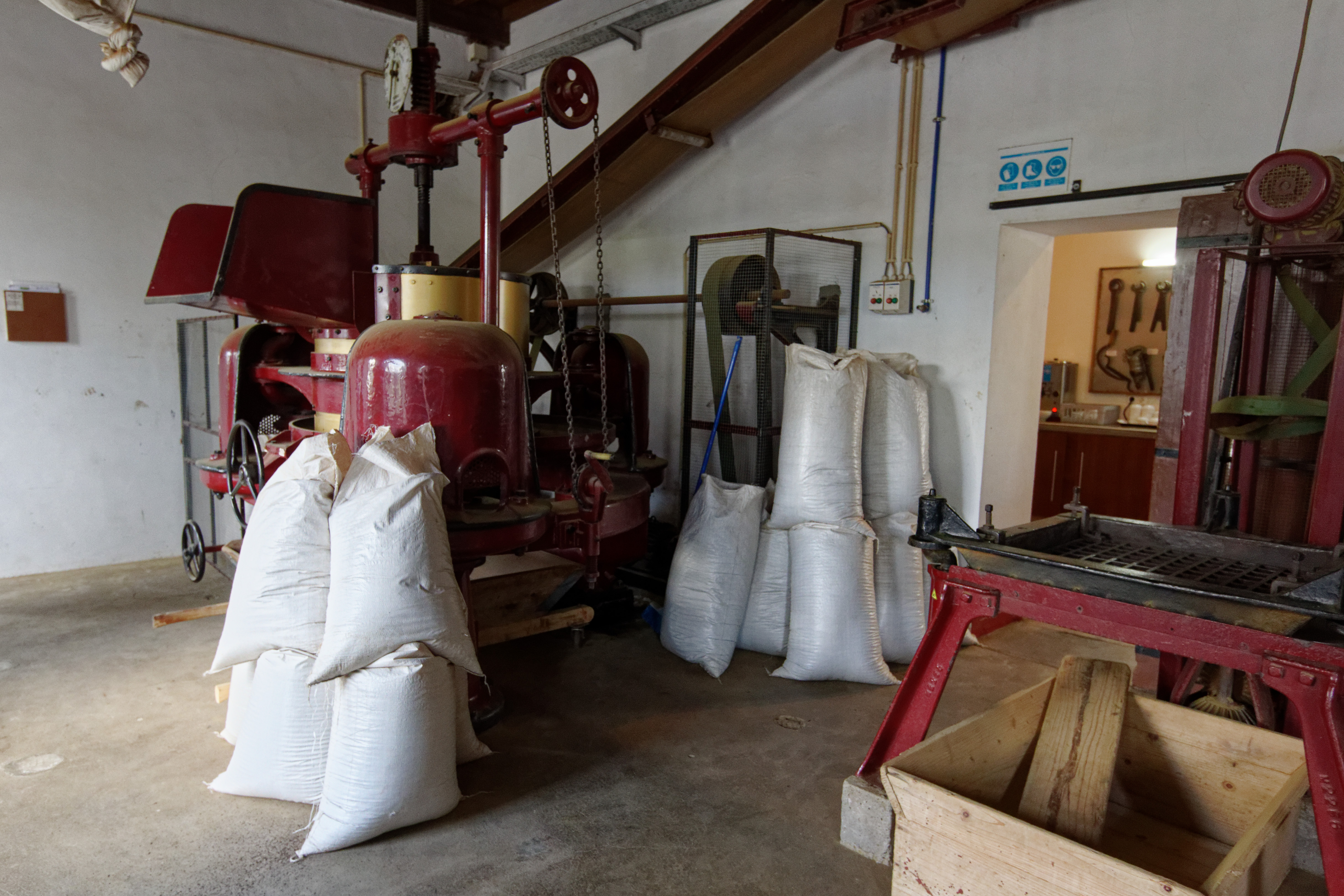
Woven Polypropylene Bags

=== Consumer packaging ===
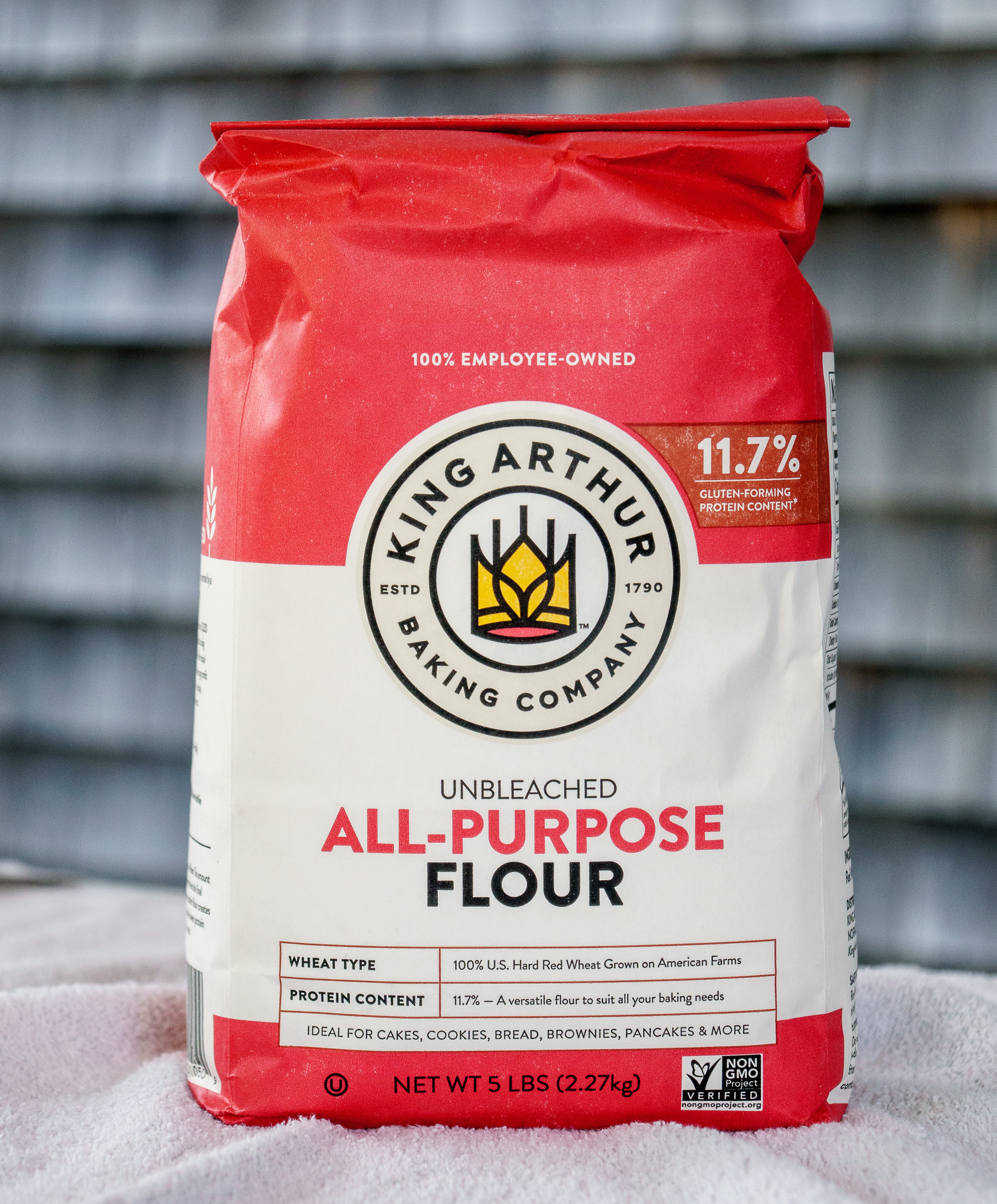
Paper sack of flour. 5 pound, 2.27 kg

Consumer packages are often bags or sacks constructed of paper. Plastic films are also used, sometimes with reclosable features. Stand-up pouches of flour have recently been introduced.

== Considerations ==
=== Contents ===
A wide variety of wheat flour are available. Flour can also be made from other grains, roots, nuts, etc. Packaging engineers and food scientists need to understand the properties of the particular flour, intended handling and logistics systems, and desired shelf life. Package forms and materials can be matched to these needs.

=== Insects ===
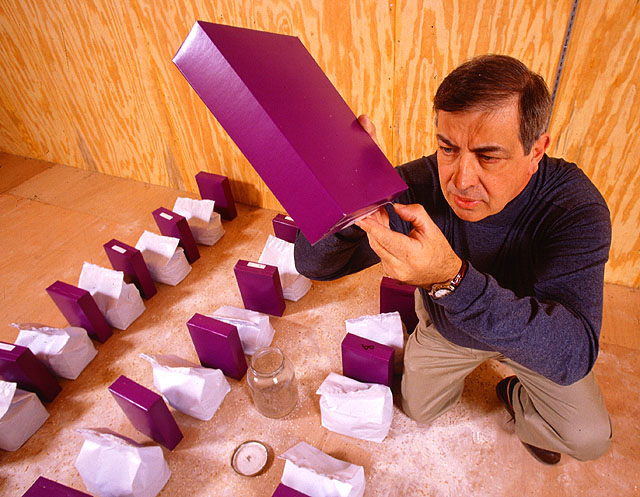
Testing the ability of packages to resist insect infestation

Insects can be a problem. When available, a suitable insecticide can be used; care must be used to ensure product safety. Hermetic plastic bags also help. When insect infestation is noted, one method of stopping further growth is to freeze the sacks of flour for several days.

== See also ==
- Flexible intermediate bulk container
- Sustainable packaging

== Cultural impact ==
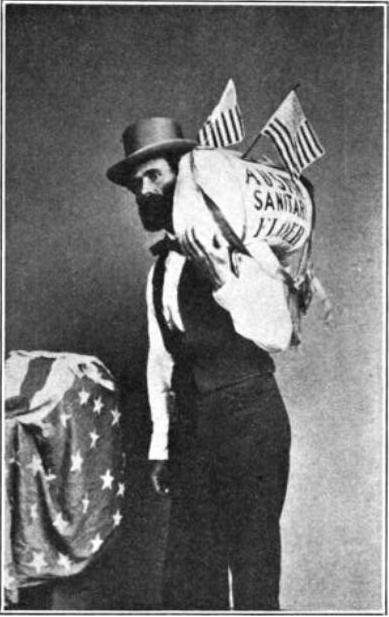
Reuel Colt Gridley became famous in the United States in 1864 by repeatedly selling a sack of flour to raise money for wounded U.S. Civil War veterans.

- Flour sack fabric has been used as a cheap source of fabrics for consumers to create their own textiles.
- Printed cotton bags were sometimes viewed as collectables.
- Various place names were named after flour sacks, since they were so ubiquitous in so many cultures. Blatobulgium in Scotland, and Pieniężno in Poland, for example, are possibly named after words for flour sack in different languages. The all-white tower in the old city of Ravensburg in Germany is called Mehlsack.
- Reuel Colt Gridley famously carried a 50-pound bag of flour on his shoulder after losing a political bet in Austin, Nevada. The sack of flour was later auctioned off, then re-donated, then re-auctioned again and again to raise money for the United States Sanitary Commission during the American Civil War. Auctioning this single flour sack eventually raised more than $250,000.
