= Toquima Cave =

- U.S. National Register of Historic Places
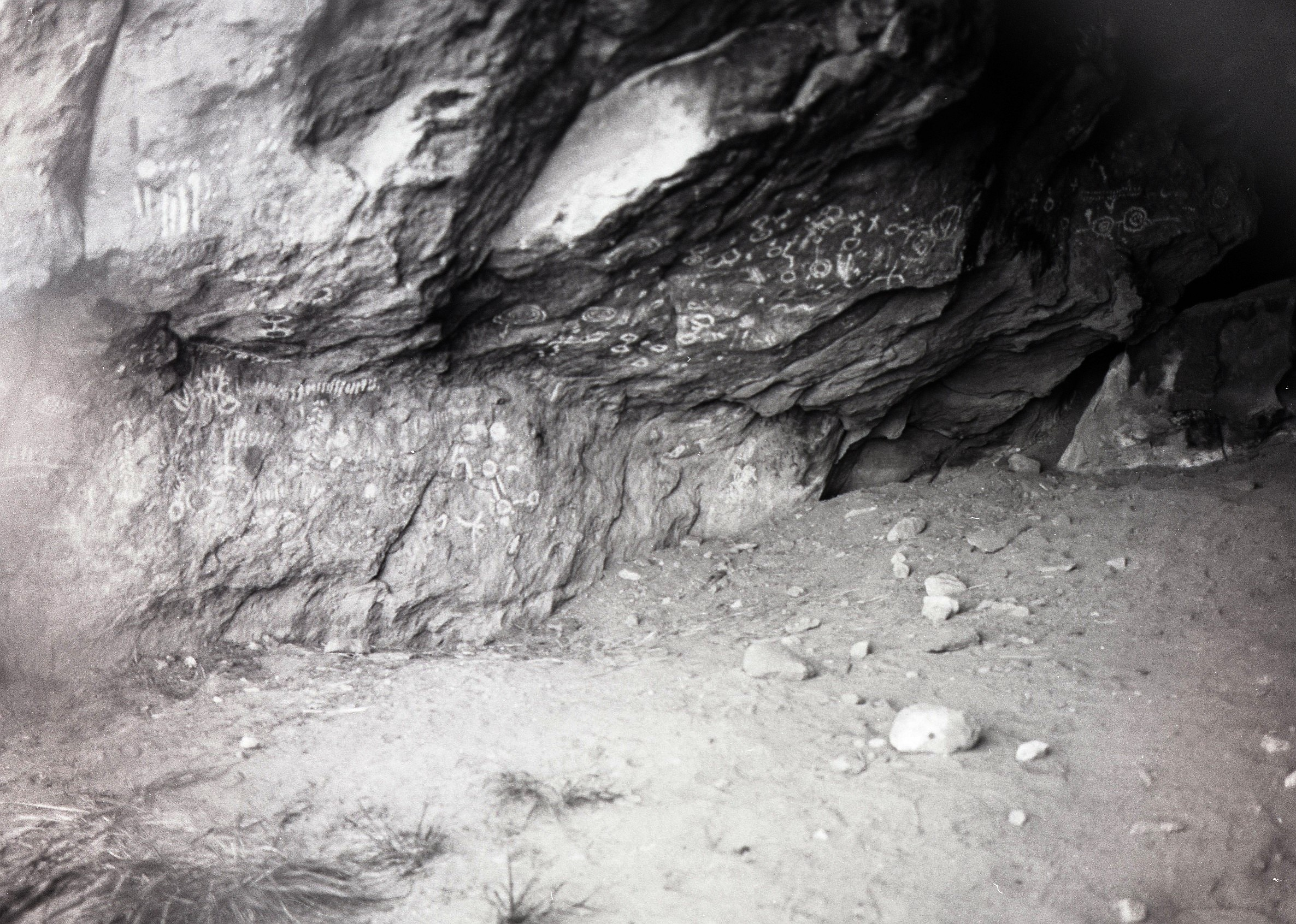

- Location within Nevada Location within the United States
- Location: Humboldt-Toiyabe National Forest, Austin, Nevada
- Coordinates: 39°11′13″N 116°47′12″W
- Area: 40 acres (16 ha)
- NRHP reference No.: 02000298

Nevada Historical Marker
- Reference no.: 136
- Added to NRHP: April 4, 2002

The Toquima Cave, located on Pete's Summit in Humboldt-Toiyabe National Forest near Austin, Nevada, is a historic site having cultural importance to Native Americans, specifically to the Western Shoshone. Also known as Pott's Cave, as Traditional Cultural Property 26-La1, and as Toiyabe N.F. Site TY-71, the cave and a 40-acre (16 ha) area was listed as an archeological site on the National Register of Historic Places in 2002. Media views of the Toquima cave are available. The cave entrance is fenced off and access to the cave is limited.
