= Gridley Store =

- U.S. National Register of Historic Places
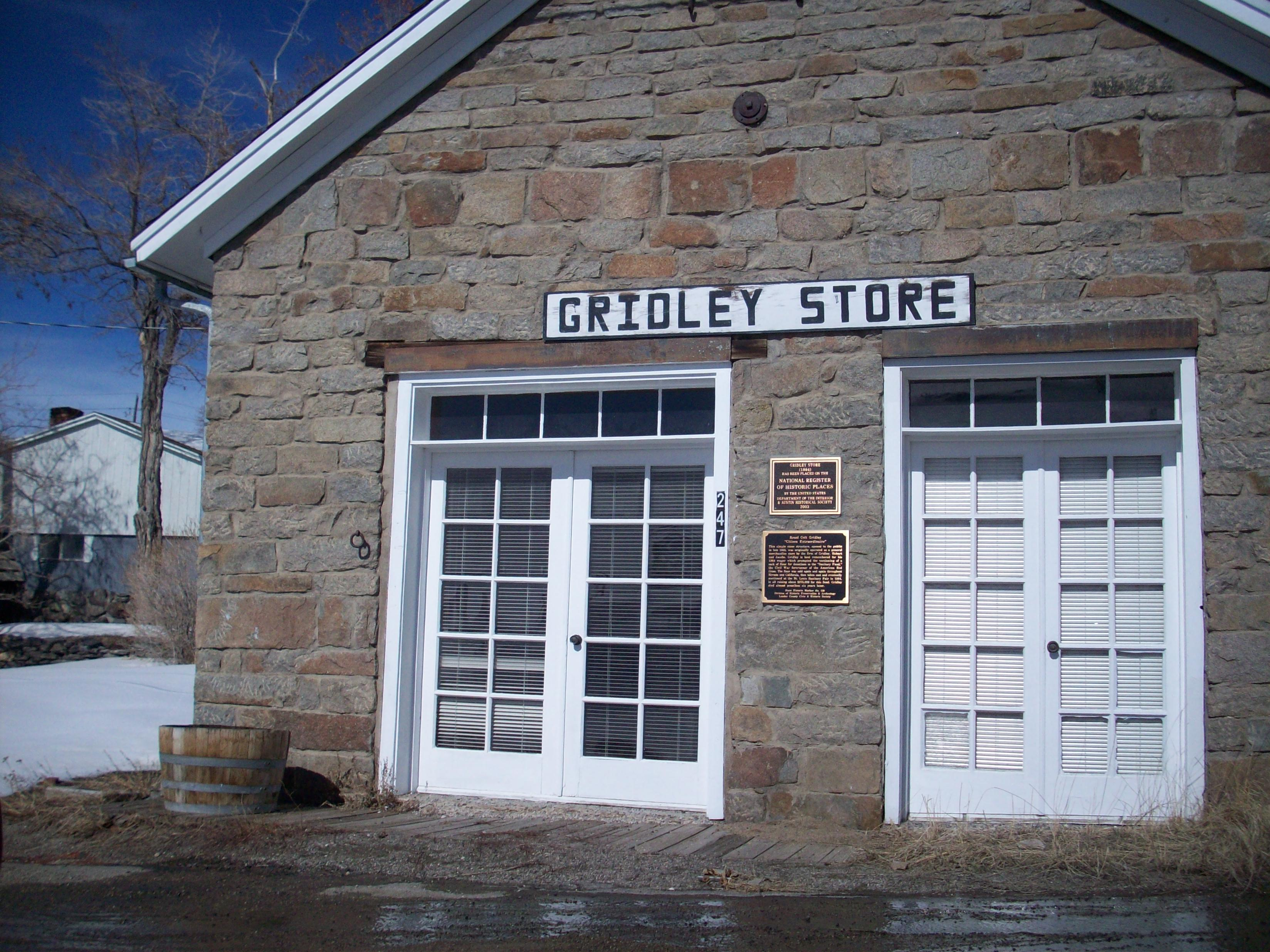

- Location within Nevada Location within the United States
- Location: 247 Water St., Austin, Nevada
- Coordinates: 39°29′23″N 117°3′44″W
- Area: 0.1 acres (0.040 ha)
- Built: 1863
- NRHP reference No.: 03000752
- Added to NRHP: August 14, 2003

The Gridley Store, at 247 Water St. in the "Upper Austin" area of Austin, Nevada, is a historic building built in 1863 but with significance dating to 1864, during the American Civil War. It is associated with Reuel Colt Gridley, who reportedly lost a bet and had to carry a 50-pound (23 kg) sack of flour throughout the town. The flour was sold as a benefit to raise money for the U.S. Sanitary Commission, which aided wounded Union soldiers. The single sack was sold and resold, raising considerable funds initially in Austin, then more broadly in Nevada, and later still in the East, in a campaign supported by Mark Twain. The fundraiser eventually earned over US$250,000 (equivalent to $5,146,000 in 2025)

The building is a one-story granite stone building. Also known as Gridley & Hobart Store and as Gridley Store Museum, it was listed on the National Register of Historic Places in 2003. Its current exterior appearance dates from it being renovated in c.1985.

In 2003, it was operated as a museum by the Austin Historical Society.
