= St. Augustine's Catholic Church (Austin, Nevada) =

Historic church in Nevada, United States

- U.S. National Register of Historic Places
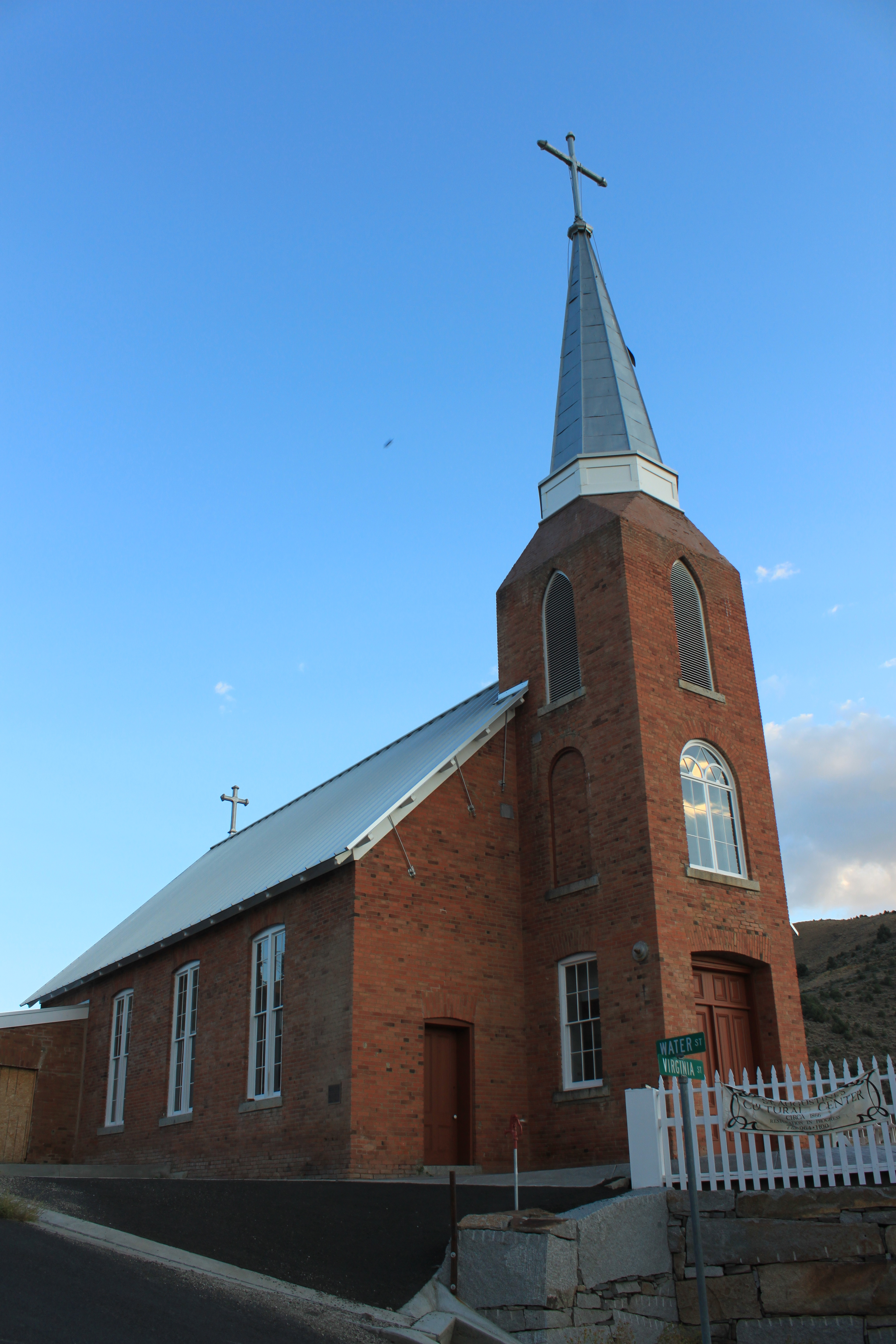

- Location within Nevada Location within the United States
- Location: 113 Virginia St., Austin, Nevada
- Coordinates: 39°29′35″N 117°4′11″W
- Area: 0.1 acres (0.040 ha)
- Built: 1886
- Built by: Jolly, Rafael; et al.
- Architectural style: Gothic Revival, Italianate.
- NRHP reference No.: 03000758
- Added to NRHP: August 14, 2003

St. Augustine's Catholic Church of Austin, Nevada, United States, located at 113 Virginia St., was built in 1866 and is Nevada's oldest Catholic church building. It includes Gothic Revival and Italianate architecture. It was extended by a c.1900 sacristy addition and was renovated in 1939. It includes mural work from 1939 by Rafael Jolly and Duff Jolly, and an organ made by Henry C. Kilgen.

It was listed on the National Register of Historic Places in 2003.
