= Plains Historical Society =

The Plains Historical Society, PHS, is located at 816 East 3rd Street Kimball, Nebraska. PHS's mission is to collect, preserve and present to the public the history of Kimball, Kimball County, and life in the Nebraska Panhandle. The society was established in 2003.

== Plains Historical Museum ==
The society operates a small building at 200 S Chestnut Street, featuring artifacts and displays showcasing the history of western Nebraska from early settlers to modern times. The museum has an outstanding arrowhead collection, and many local historical artifacts are on permanent loan.

== See also ==
- List of Nebraska Historical Societies
- History of Nebraska
