= Nebraska History Museum =

History Museum in Nebraska, Lincoln, NE, USA

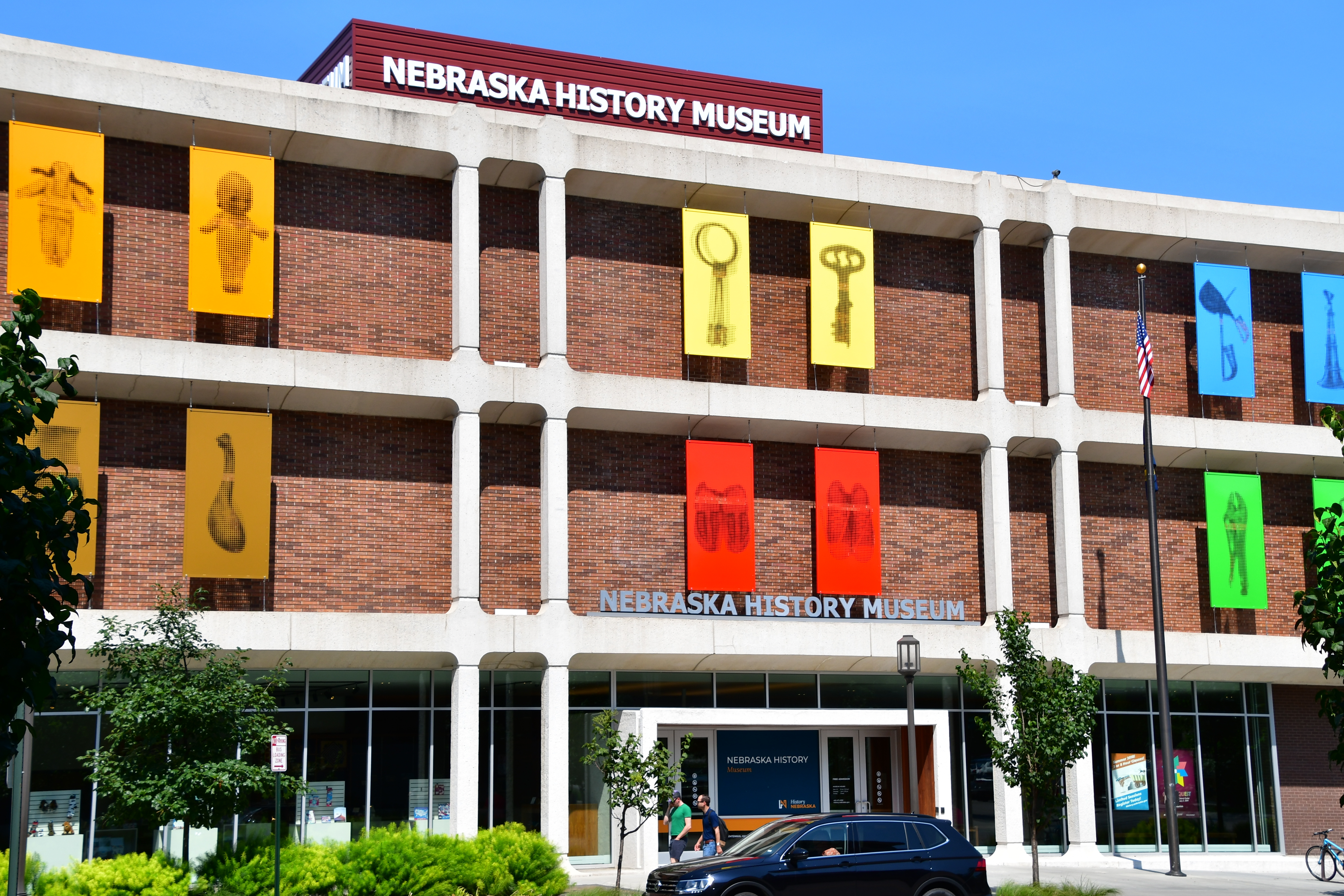
- The Nebraska History Museum in 2023
- Established: October 8, 1983
- Location: 131 Centennial Mall N., Lincoln, Nebraska, U.S.
- Coordinates: 40.81444822009915°N 96.70018600889733°W
- Type: History museum
- Owner: Nebraska State Historical Society
- Website: history.nebraska.gov/museum/

The Nebraska History Museum is a museum in Lincoln, Nebraska, United States. Operated by the Nebraska State Historical Society, the museum was formed by the Nebraska State Legislature in 1983. The museum displays various objects, photographs, and manuscripts from the Nebraska State Historical Society collections and archives through unique exhibits and hosts traveling exhibits that share other aspects of Nebraska history.

== History ==
The Nebraska History Museum was announced as the Nebraska State Museum of History in 1982. The museum was created by the Nebraska State Legislature, and would be operated by the Nebraska State Historical Society. The museum would be built inside of the former Elks Building, which was built in 1967, and was acquired by the state in 1979. The museum officially opened in October 1983.

In 2015, the museum underwent major renovations. Renovations included replacing the HVAC systems inside, which dated back to the buildings completion in the late 1960s. Additionally renovations would bring the building into compliance with the Americans with Disabilities Act. The facade of the building added a new sign, and twelve aluminum panels, with images of artifacts imprinted on them.

== Collection ==
The museum covers approximately 12,000 years of Nebraska history. The museum's collection includes information from several era's of the state's history, including its indigenous history, with a bust of Standing Bear, chief of the Ponca and farm implements made out of bison bones.
