= Austin, Nevada =

Unincorporated town in the State of Nevada, United States

- Unincorporated town
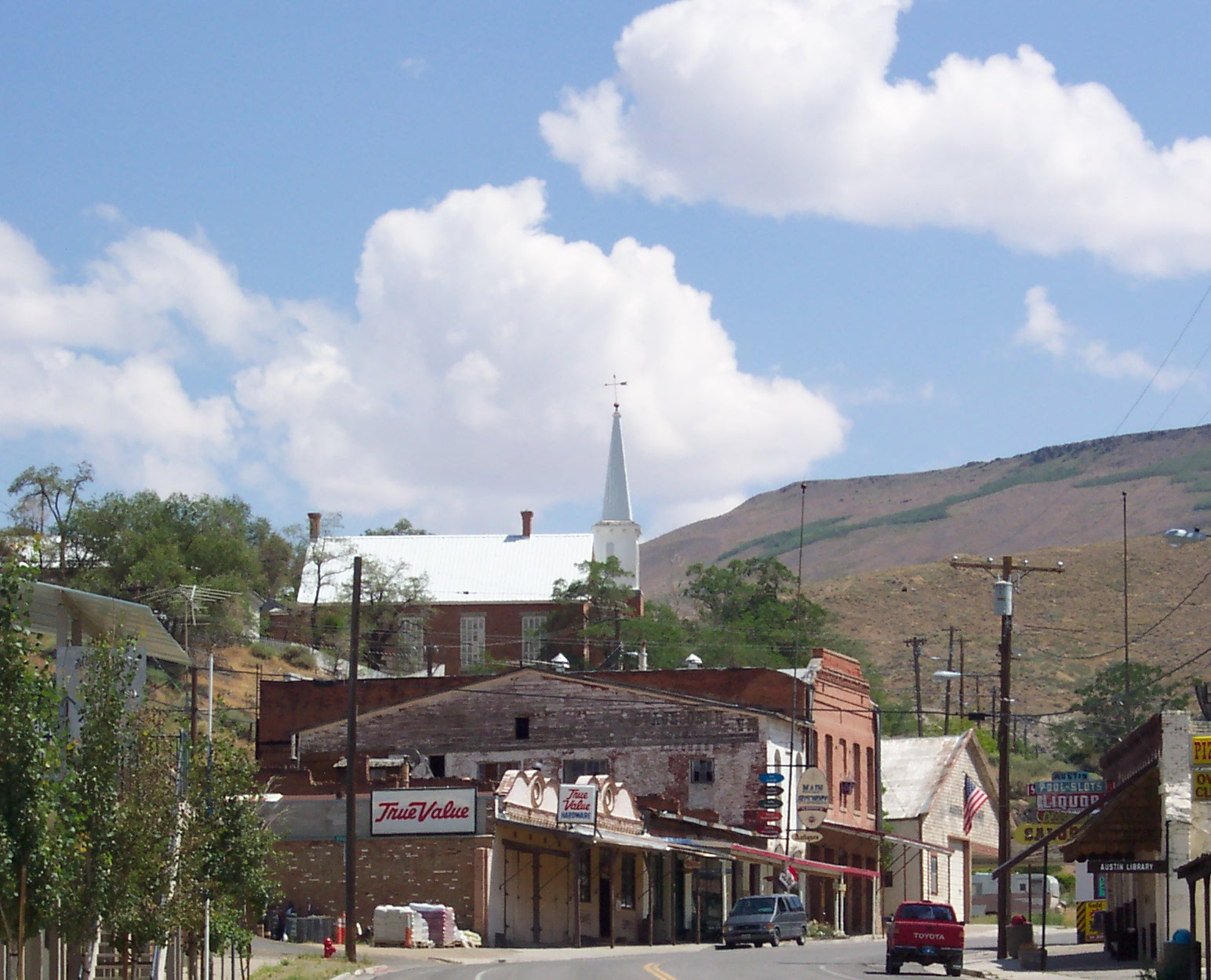
- Austin in 2004, looking east on U.S. Route 50

- Location within the state of Nevada
- Coordinates: 39°29′31″N 117°4′13″W
- Country: United States
- State: Nevada
- County: Lander

Area
  - Total: 1.15 sq mi (2.98 km^{2})
  - Land: 1.15 sq mi (2.98 km^{2})
  - Water: 0 sq mi (0.00 km^{2})
- Elevation: 6,555 ft (1,998 m)

Population (2020)
  - Total: 167
  - Density: 145.2/sq mi (56.05/km^{2})
- Time zone: UTC−8 (Pacific (PST))
  - Summer (DST): UTC−7 (PDT)
- ZIP codes: 89310
- FIPS code: 32-03700
- GNIS feature ID: 2583910

Nevada Historical Marker
- Reference no.: 8

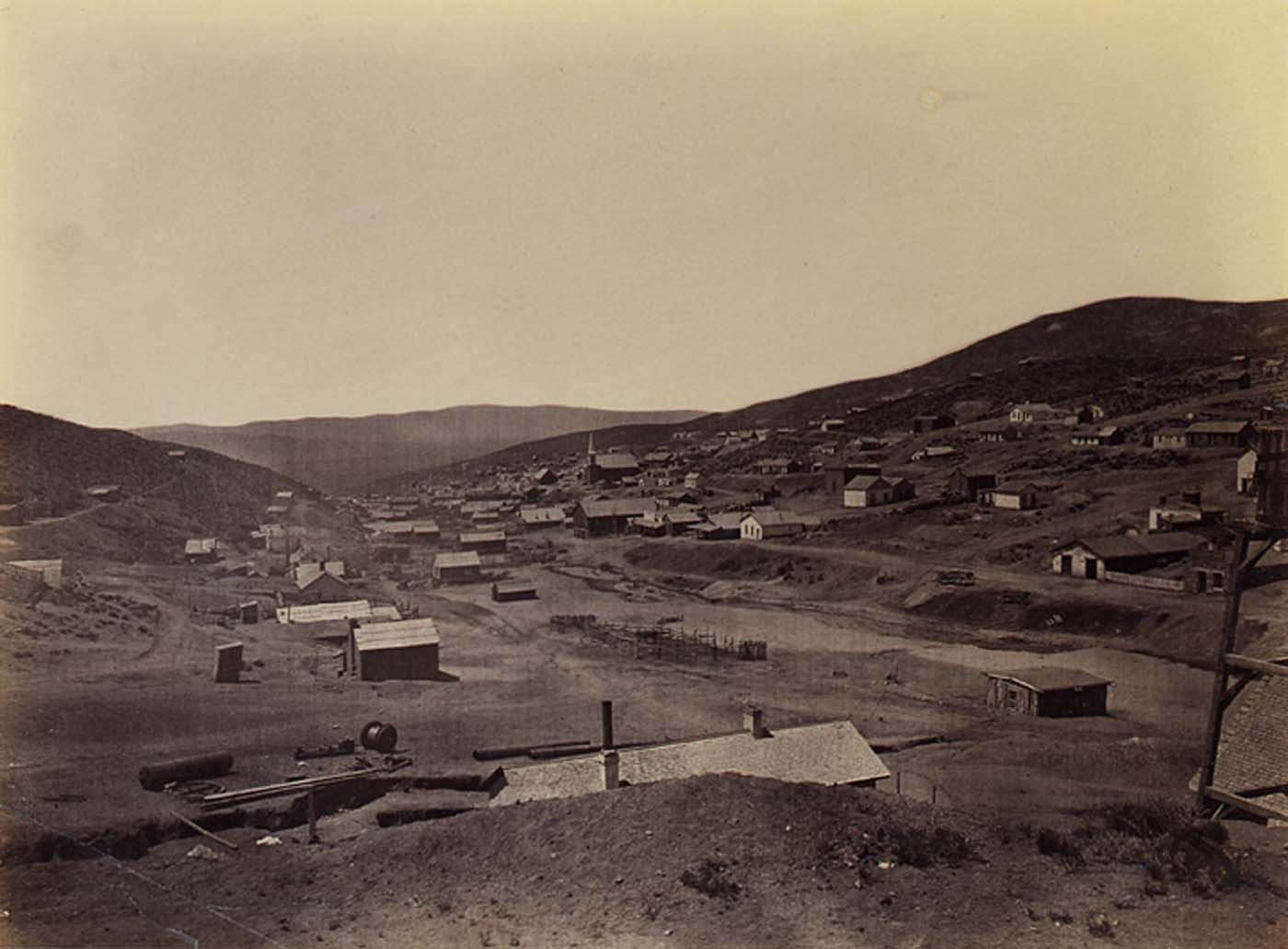
Austin in 1868. Photo by Timothy H. O'Sullivan.

Austin is an unincorporated town and census-designated place in and the former county seat of Lander County, Nevada, United States. In 2020, the place had a population of 167. It is located on the western slopes of the Toiyabe Range at an elevation of 6,575 feet (2,004 m); U.S. Route 50 passes through.

== History ==
The Austin area was originally occupied by bands of the Western Shoshone people. The city of Austin was mapped out in 1862 by David Buell. This was during the American Civil War, and the Union was eager to find new sources of precious metals, especially gold, to support the war effort. The city was named after Buell's partner, Alvah Austin, during a silver rush. The valued metal was reputedly found when a Pony Express horse kicked over a rock and observers noticed the silver. In 1862, it was designated as the county seat of Lander County. (In 1979, after the center of population had shifted, the county seat was shifted to Battle Mountain.) By summer 1863, Austin and the surrounding Reese River Mining District had a population of more than 10,000, mostly European Americans attracted to the silver boom. In January 1864, a petition was created to combine Clifton, Austin and Upper Austin into the "City of Austin." The Governor signed the bill in February 1864. In 1864, the town launched Reuel Colt Gridley's impromptu fundraising drive that raised over $250,000 for wounded Civil War veterans, by repeatedly auctioning a sack of flour.

The Nevada Central Railroad was built to connect Austin with the transcontinental railroad at Battle Mountain in 1880. However, by that time the silver boom was almost over. The city was disincorporated in 1881. Major silver production ended by 1887, although there was a slight revival in the 1910s. In the mid-1950s there was a great deal of interest in uranium deposits in the area, to fuel the emerging nuclear industry, but the ore proved to be of low quality.

Gold and silver mining has continued in the area sporadically and at generally low levels of production. High quality turquoise is still mined in the area in small quantities. Several shops manufacture jewelry from local turquoise.

== Geography ==
The Austin silver deposits consist of numerous narrow (often only several inches in width) quartz veins hosted in monzonite rock. The main ore minerals are sulfides that contain silver, including large quantities of galena and tetrahedrite. Oxidized ore, which was very shallow, included silver chloride (chlorargyrite) which was easily reduced to metallic silver, although these oxidized deposits were exhausted quickly. The deeper sulfide (hypogene) ore was much more difficult to work and had to be roasted prior to amalgamation. Milling and concentration was used to separate the silver-containing sulfides from the barren quartz. Because of the added expense of this kind of processing along with the narrow veins, only high grade ores could be profitably worked in Austin.

The Austin veins are of an older age and were formed at a greater depth than many other silver districts in Nevada, such as the epithermal veins of Virginia City (Comstock Lode). In addition, the value of the Austin ores was largely (with several exceptions) silver (with significant base metals (lead, zinc and copper)) with very little gold, whereas most epithermal veins have highly significant gold.

=== Climate ===
Austin experiences a cold semi-arid climate (Köppen BSk) with cold, snowy winters and hot, dry summers.

Climate data for Austin, Nevada, 1991–2020 normals, extremes 1887–present
Month	Jan	Feb	Mar	Apr	May	Jun	Jul	Aug	Sep	Oct	Nov	Dec	Year
Record high °F (°C)	70 (21)	70 (21)	78 (26)	83 (28)	93 (34)	98 (37)	105 (41)	100 (38)	97 (36)	86 (30)	79 (26)	70 (21)	105 (41)
Mean maximum °F (°C)	57.1 (13.9)	59.1 (15.1)	66.6 (19.2)	74.3 (23.5)	81.9 (27.7)	89.9 (32.2)	95.0 (35.0)	92.5 (33.6)	87.3 (30.7)	77.8 (25.4)	65.7 (18.7)	56.7 (13.7)	95.6 (35.3)
Mean daily maximum °F (°C)	42.2 (5.7)	43.9 (6.6)	50.3 (10.2)	55.5 (13.1)	65.1 (18.4)	76.2 (24.6)	85.9 (29.9)	83.8 (28.8)	75.0 (23.9)	62.1 (16.7)	49.3 (9.6)	40.5 (4.7)	60.8 (16.0)
Daily mean °F (°C)	34.2 (1.2)	35.0 (1.7)	40.7 (4.8)	45.0 (7.2)	53.9 (12.2)	63.4 (17.4)	72.6 (22.6)	70.8 (21.6)	62.6 (17.0)	51.0 (10.6)	40.0 (4.4)	32.6 (0.3)	50.2 (10.1)
Mean daily minimum °F (°C)	26.2 (−3.2)	26.1 (−3.3)	31.0 (−0.6)	34.4 (1.3)	42.7 (5.9)	50.6 (10.3)	59.3 (15.2)	57.7 (14.3)	50.2 (10.1)	39.9 (4.4)	30.7 (−0.7)	24.7 (−4.1)	39.5 (4.1)
Mean minimum °F (°C)	6.4 (−14.2)	9.6 (−12.4)	13.5 (−10.3)	19.1 (−7.2)	25.6 (−3.6)	31.8 (−0.1)	45.7 (7.6)	42.7 (5.9)	32.8 (0.4)	20.1 (−6.6)	11.3 (−11.5)	4.5 (−15.3)	0.8 (−17.3)
Record low °F (°C)	−25 (−32)	−18 (−28)	−6 (−21)	3 (−16)	10 (−12)	20 (−7)	31 (−1)	25 (−4)	17 (−8)	2 (−17)	−7 (−22)	−20 (−29)	−25 (−32)
Average precipitation inches (mm)	1.22 (31)	1.15 (29)	1.46 (37)	1.64 (42)	1.86 (47)	0.61 (15)	0.58 (15)	0.40 (10)	0.64 (16)	0.53 (13)	1.11 (28)	1.14 (29)	12.34 (312)
Average snowfall inches (cm)	10.4 (26)	12.9 (33)	11.8 (30)	8.4 (21)	2.6 (6.6)	0.9 (2.3)	0.0 (0.0)	0.0 (0.0)	0.3 (0.76)	0.8 (2.0)	6.8 (17)	8.7 (22)	63.6 (160.66)
Average precipitation days (≥ 0.01 in)	6.1	4.6	5.7	6.2	6.4	2.8	1.9	2.2	2.4	2.0	4.1	4.8	49.2
Average snowy days (≥ 0.1 in)	4.7	4.5	4.0	3.6	1.1	0.2	0.0	0.0	0.2	0.4	3.1	4.8	26.6
Source 1: NOAA
Source 2: National Weather Service

== Demographics ==
Historical population
Census	Pop.	Note	%±
1870	1,324		—
1880	1,679		26.8%
1890	1,215		−27.6%
1900	702		−42.2%
1910	755		7.5%
1920	666		−11.8%
1930	661		−0.8%
1940	580		−12.3%
1950	419		−27.8%
1960	389		−7.2%
1990	990		—
2000	468		−52.7%
2010	192		−59.0%
2020	167		−13.0%

In 1863 Austin had a permanent and transient population of about 7,000. With the end of gold and silver mining in the region, the population has steadily declined.

== Attractions ==
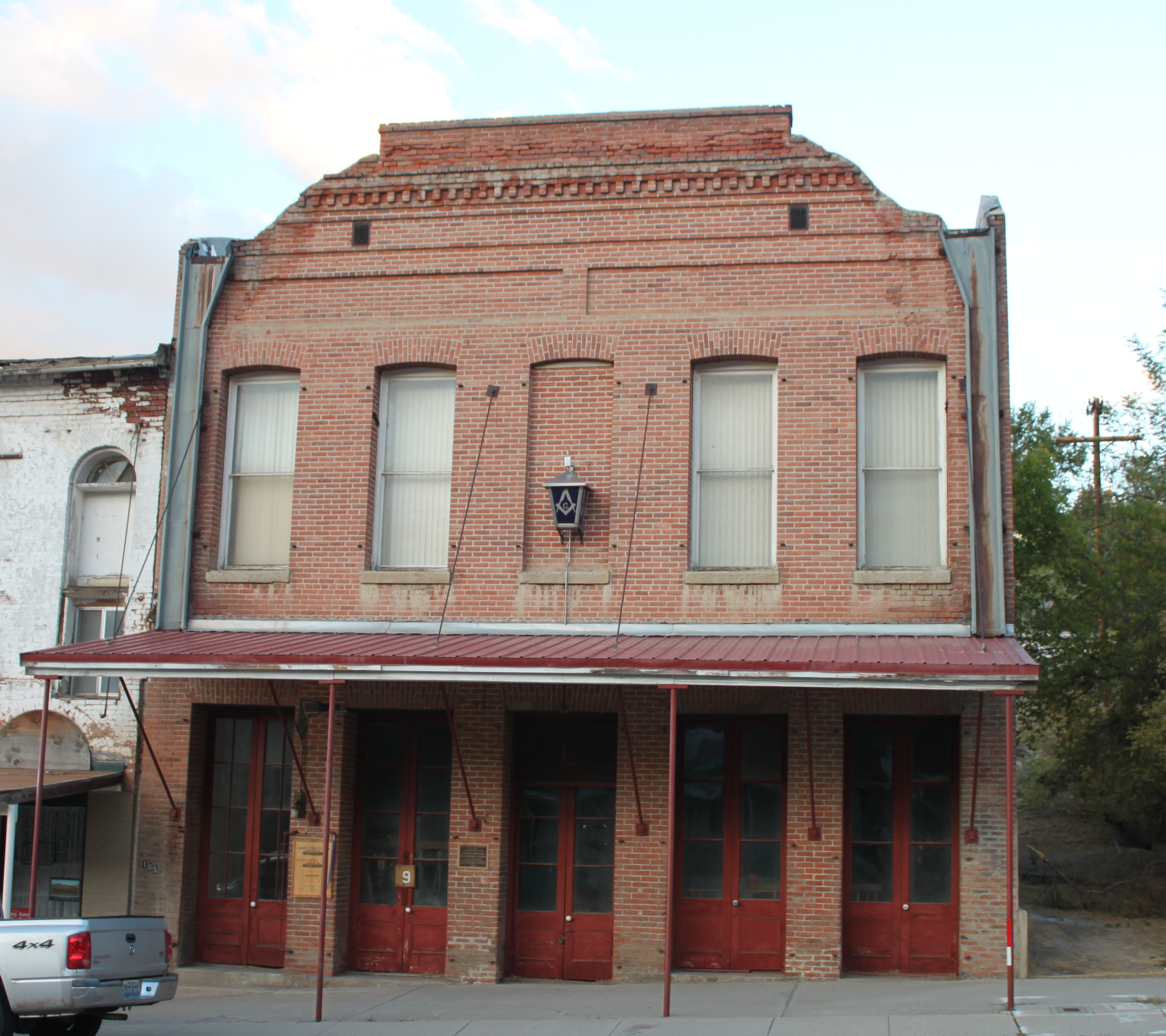
Austin Odd Fellows Home and Masonic Lodge, built in 1867

Austin is a "living ghost town", a well-preserved example of an early Nevada mining town. It contains four churches; both the Catholic church and the Austin Methodist Church were built in 1866. The Methodist Church is now used as a community center. The Catholic Church, St. Augustine's, has been purchased and is being restored as a cultural center for Central Nevada. The Episcopal church, dedicated to St. George and considered by some to be the prettiest frontier church still standing, was built in 1878 and is still in regular use. These three churches are listed as Nevada Historical Marker 67.

The fourth church is a more recent building built by the Church of Jesus Christ of Latter-day Saints. The International Hotel, first built in Virginia City in 1859 and moved to Austin in 1863, still serves meals and drinks, but it does not rent out rooms (there is a motel across the street). The International Hotel is said to be the oldest in Nevada. Austin contains numerous other historical buildings, in various states of repair.

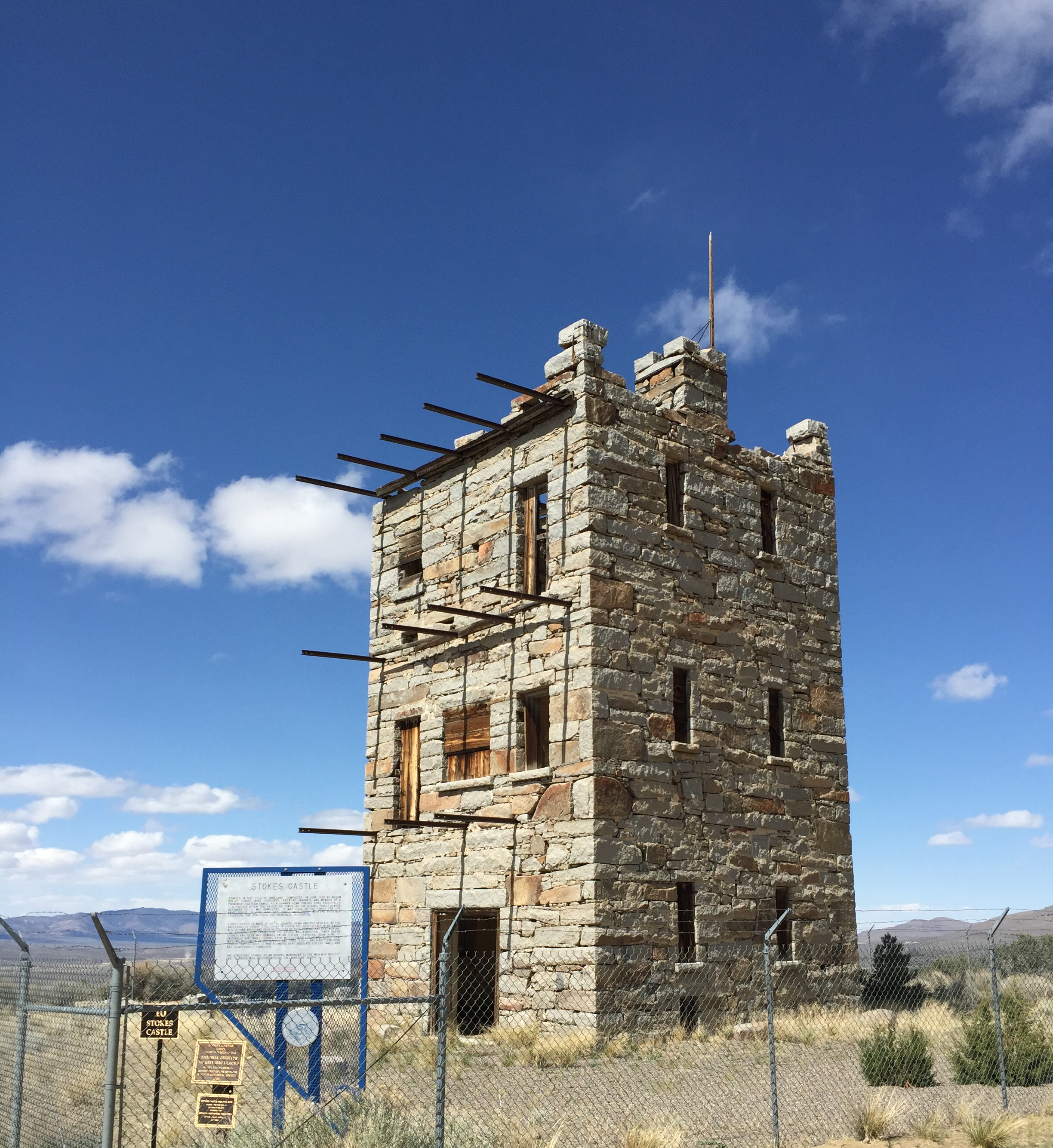
Stokes Castle in 2015

Stokes Castle, an Italian-style three-story stone tower, is located just outside Austin. It was built in 1897 by Anson Phelps Stokes, a wealthy New York capitalist who had a financial interest in several of the local mines. It was occupied only for a month. Vacant and abandoned, it fell into disrepair.

In addition to Stokes Castle and the three churches, a number of other structures in Austin are listed on the National Register of Historic Places. These include the Austin Cemetery, the old city hall, the Austin Masonic and Odd Fellows Hall, the Gridley Store, the former Lander County Courthouse, and Lander County High School, as well as the Austin Historic District. Toquima Cave, an archeological and prehistoric site near the town, is also listed on the Register.

Approximately 15 miles (24 km) east of Austin is a cluster of natural hot springs maintained by visitors and local volunteers. The Hickison Petroglyph Recreation Area, 24 miles (39 km) east of Austin, features a short interpretive trail where visitors can see ancient drawings carved into the rocks.

== Government ==
Austin is the headquarters of the federally recognized Yomba Shoshone Tribe of the Yomba Reservation.

== Infrastructure ==
Austin has a public library, a branch of the Elko-Lander-Eureka County Library System.

== Notable people ==
- Abe Murdock, U.S. senator and representative from Utah
- J. S. Slauson, mayor of Austin and land developer in California
- Erroll James Livingston Taber, justice of the Supreme Court of Nevada

== In popular culture ==
- In the Lucky Luke book Le Fil qui chante, the caravan makes a stop at Austin to restock on telegraph poles.
- In 2025 Nisiros literary journal Vernacular published a former Nevada author's non-fiction Layer Cake about the accidental killing of a lizard in an Austin, Nevada campground.
- Austin, Nevada was used as a filming location for the 1971 cult film Vanishing Point. Several scenes featuring the white 1970 Dodge Challenger R/T were shot in and around the town as the car travels along U.S. Route 50.
