= Stephen F. Austin High School (Fort Bend County, Texas) =

Austin High School

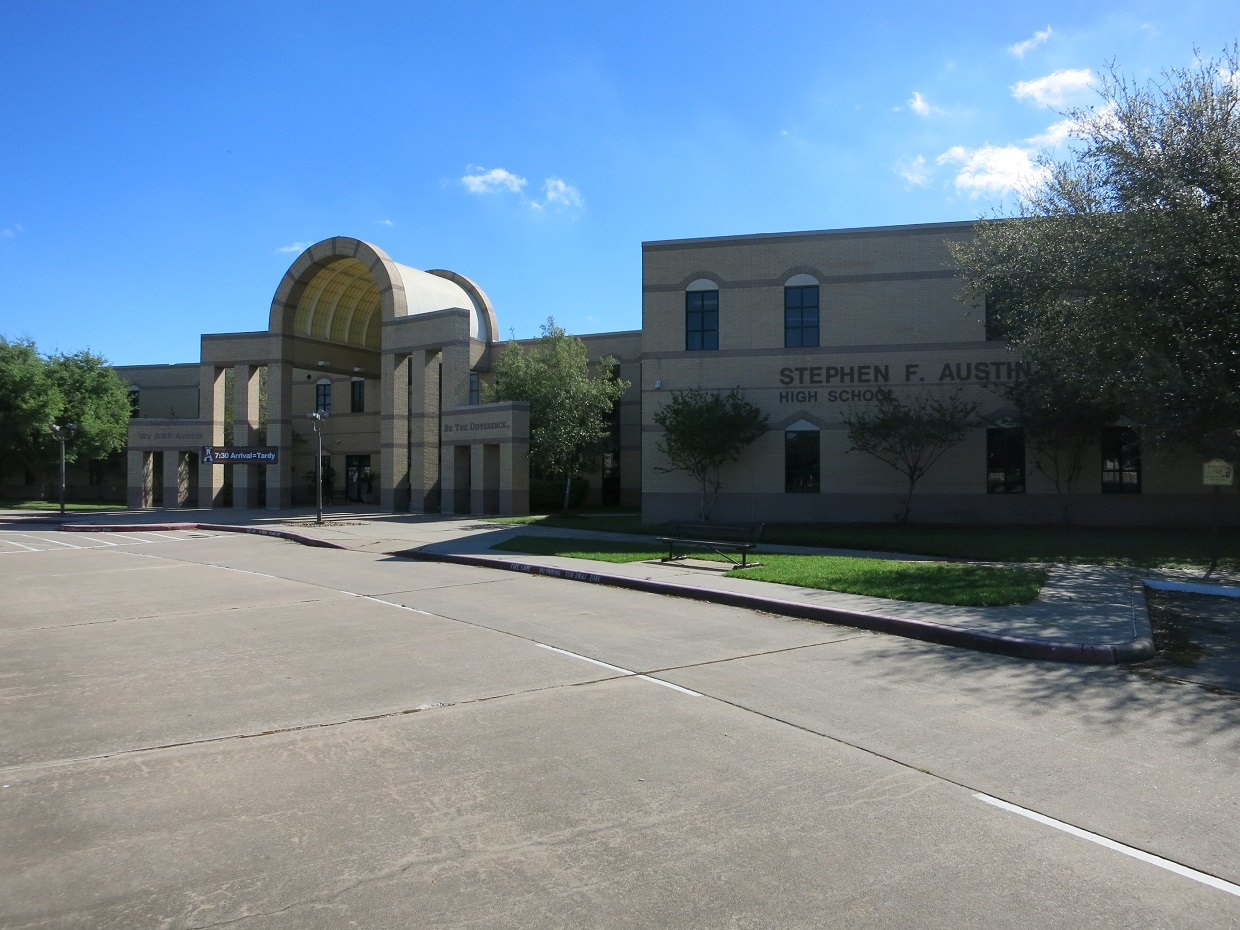

Location
- Sugar Land, TX 77498; United States; 29.6409°N 95.677229°W

Information
- Type: Public high school
- Established: 1995; 31 years ago
- Locale: Suburban
- School district: Fort Bend Independent School District
- NCES District ID: 4819650
- Educational authority: Texas Education Agency
- Superintendent: Marc Smith
- CEEB code: 445860
- NCES School ID: 481965007000
- Principal: Rachel Cortez
- Teaching staff: 139.62 (FTE)
- Grades: 9–12
- Gender: Coeducational
- Enrollment: 2,655 (2024-2025)
  - Grade 9: 705
  - Grade 10: 714
  - Grade 11: 663
  - Grade 12: 573
- Student to teacher ratio: 19.02
- Colors: Black; Red
- Athletics conference: UIL Class 6A
- Mascot: Spike The Bulldog
- Rival: Travis High School
- USNWR ranking: 655/27,000 (top 2.5% in nation)
- 2011 TEA Rating: Recognized
- Website: Official website

Stephen F. Austin High School is a secondary school located in unincorporated Fort Bend County, Texas and is named after Stephen F. Austin, who helped lead American settlement of Texas, and who is widely regarded as "The Father of Texas." The school happens to be only miles from Austin's original colony in present-day Fort Bend County.

Some areas of Sugar Land, Windsor Estates, and the western portion of the community of New Territory are zoned to Austin. On previous occasions employee housing units of the Jester State Prison Farm (including Jester I Unit, Carol Vance Unit, Jester III Unit) were zoned to Austin.

The school, which serves grades 9-12, is a part of the Fort Bend Independent School District. Although having a Sugar Land, Texas address, the school is located outside the city limits of Sugar Land; only students from New Territory live within the City of Sugar Land.

== History ==
Austin opened in 1995 to alleviate overcrowding from Kempner High School and Clements High School. Austin was FBISD's sixth comprehensive high school.

When Travis High School opened, some of Austin's territory was given to Travis, and Austin took some territory from Kempner High School. In the territories, grades 9 and 10 were immediately zoned to the new high school, and grades 11 to 12 continued to go to the previous high schools with a phaseout of one grade per year.

In 2006 the Smithville area, employee housing of the Central Unit state prison (which housed minor dependents of prison employees) was rezoned from Kempner to Austin, with grades 9-10 immediately zoned to Austin, and grades 11-12 zoned to Kempner, with a phasing in by grade. Smithville had since been rezoned back to Kempner. The main portion of the Central Unit remained zoned to Austin until the unit's 2011 closure.

== Campus ==
Austin is located off of FM 1464, across from Shiloh Lake Estates and Grand Parkway Baptist Church. Surrounding the building are the Summerfield neighborhood to the south, the Safari Texas Ranch banquet on the north side, and the Pheasant Creek neighborhood across a ditch to the east. Nearby are Oyster Creek Elementary School and Macario Garcia Middle School, which are wholly and partially zoned to the school, respectively.

== Neighborhoods served ==
Several different communities within unincorporated Fort Bend County are zoned to Austin, including Old Orchard, Orchard Lake Estates, Stratford Park Village, Summerfield, Pheasent Creek, Park Pointe, Park Pointe Commons, Oak Lake Estates, Village of Oak Lake, Hidden Lake Estates, Shiloh Lake Estates, and the subdivisions of Aliana south of West Airport, which are all zoned to Macario Garcia Middle School. The eastern half of New Territory, which is within the City of Sugar Land, is also zoned to Austin but through Sartartia Middle School instead.

In previous eras, Austin served sections of Mission Bend and Pecan Grove.

== Feeder patterns ==
Feeder elementary schools to Austin include:

- Oyster Creek Elementary
- Walker Station Elementary
- Lakeview (partial)
- Madden Elementary (partial)
- Holley Elementary (partial)
- Arizona Fleming Elementary (partial)
- Malala Elementary (partial)

Feeder middle schools include:

- Macario Garcia Middle School (partial)
- Sartartia Middle School (partial)

== Music ==
The SFA Bulldog Band consists of over 150 student performers within its Marching Band, Concert Band, and Full Orchestra. The program encompasses a wide range of musical endeavors, including state and national competitions, as well as individual and ensemble events.

The school's orchestra has participated in the Midwest Clinic, a renowned music conference held annually.

== Notable alumni ==
- Katie Armiger, country musician
- Devard Darling, football player for NFL's Kansas City Chiefs
- Devaughn Darling, twin brother of Devard Darling and former Florida State Seminoles
- Jerry Hughes, football player for Texas Christian University and NFL's Buffalo Bills, Indianapolis Colts, Houston Texans
- Simone Manuel, swimmer for Stanford, American record holder in 100-yard freestyle, 2016 Olympics gold medalist
- Troy Omeire, college football wide receiver for the UNLV Rebels
- Lab Ox, hip-hop music producer
- Adam Senn, model
- Keshi, singer-songwriter and producer
- Jessica Zhu, classical concert pianist
- Andy Young, Emmy-Nominated film & television editor
- Kerem Bürsin, Turkish actor
- Hanumankind, rapper
- Jasmine Amy Rogers, Broadway actress in Boop! The Musical
