= Harlem 1 =

Harlem 1 may refer to:

- Jester I Unit, a punishment facility in Texas and originally named Harlem 1 Unit
- Success Academy Harlem 1, a charter school in New York City
