= Richmond, Texas =

- City
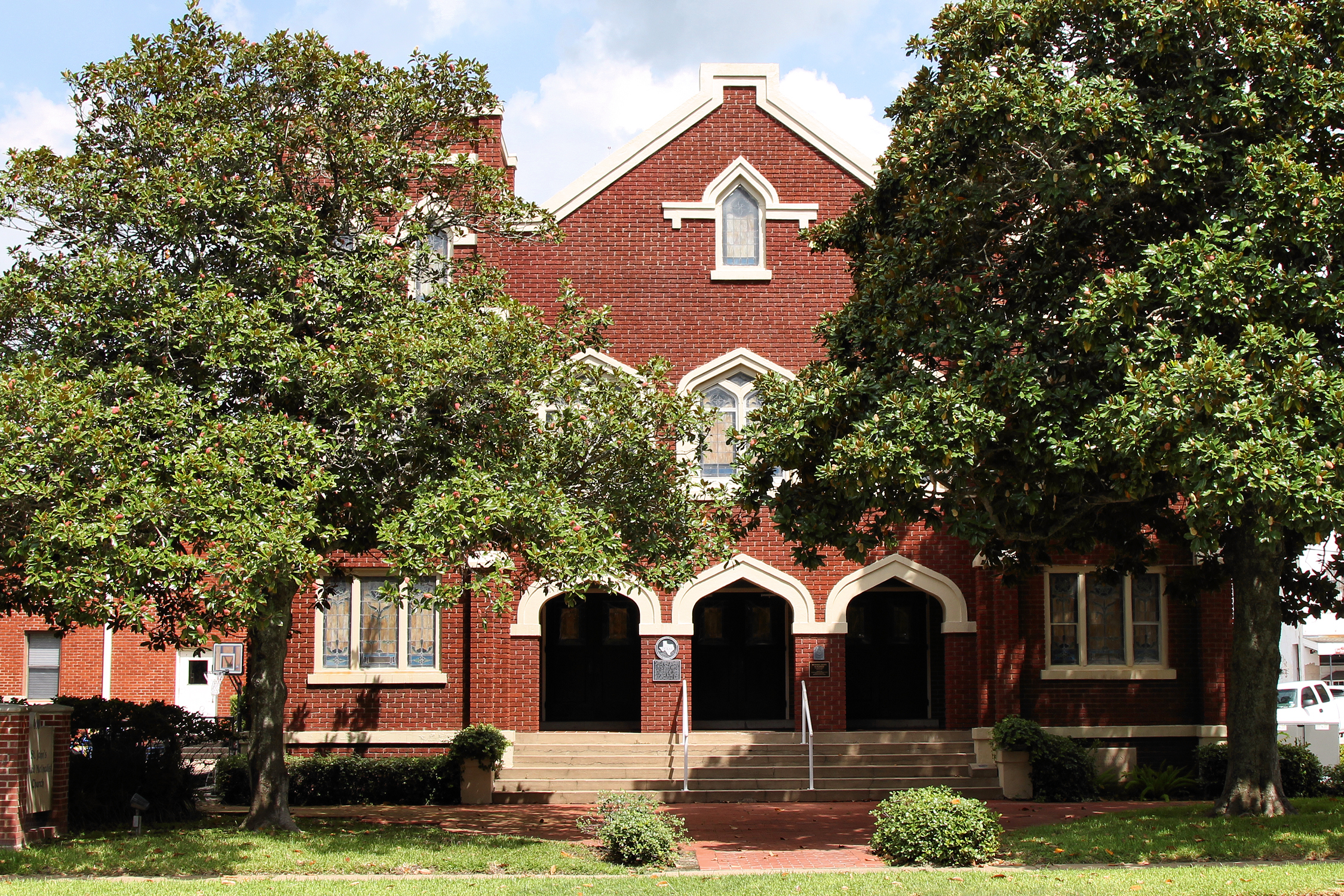
- St. John's United Methodist Church, designated as a Recorded Texas Historic Landmark in 1983.
- Motto: "A Charming Past. A Soaring Future"
- Location of Richmond, Texas
- Coordinates: 29°34′56″N 95°45′39″W
- Country: United States
- State: Texas
- County: Fort Bend
- incorporated: 1837

Government
  - Type: Commission-manager
  - Mayor: Rebecca "Becky" Haas

Area
  - Total: 4.44 sq mi (11.50 km^{2})
  - Land: 4.08 sq mi (10.58 km^{2})
  - Water: 0.36 sq mi (0.92 km^{2})
- Elevation: 92 ft (28 m)

Population (2020)
  - Total: 11,627
  - Density: 3,077.9/sq mi (1,188.39/km^{2})
- Time zone: UTC-6 (Central (CST))
  - Summer (DST): UTC-5 (CDT)
- ZIP Codes: 77406, 77407, 77469
- Area codes: 281, 346, 621, 713, 832
- FIPS code: 48-61892
- GNIS feature ID: 1345187
- Website: richmondtx.gov

Richmond is a suburb of Houston and the county seat of Fort Bend County, Texas, United States. The city is located within the Houston–Pasadena–The Woodlands metropolitan area. As of the 2020 census, Richmond had a population of 11,627.

== History ==
In 1822, a group of Austin's colonists went up the Brazos River, stopping near present-day Richmond where they built a fort called "Fort Bend". Named after Richmond, England, the town was among the 19 cities first incorporated by the short-lived Republic of Texas, in 1837. Early residents of the city include many prominent figures in Texas lore such as Jane Long, Deaf Smith, and Mirabeau Lamar, who are all buried in Richmond, as is Walter Moses Burton, the nation's first Black elected sheriff. On August 16, 1889, the town was the site of the "Battle of Richmond", an armed fight culminating the Jaybird–Woodpecker War, a violent feud over post-Reconstruction political control of Fort Bend County. The mayor from 1949 until his death in 2012 was Hilmar Moore.

Historically Richmond had government agencies and nonprofit organizations, while most of the area private businesses were located in Rosenberg.

== Geography ==
Richmond is located near the center of Fort Bend County. Most of the city is situated on the southwest side of the Brazos River, with a small portion (Richmond Landing) on the northeast side, connected by US Highway 90A. Richmond is bordered to the southwest by the city of Rosenberg. US 90A leads east 8 miles (13 km) to Sugar Land and west through Rosenberg 19 miles (31 km) to East Bernard. Downtown Houston is 30 miles (48 km) to the northeast.

According to the United States Census Bureau, the city of Richmond has a total area of 4.3 square miles (11.1 km^{2}), of which 3.9 square miles (10.2 km^{2}) are land and 0.35 square miles (0.9 km^{2}), or 8.22%, is covered by water.

In 2003, Jeannie Kever of the Houston Chronicle said, "Some of the old buildings have been reincarnated as shops or law offices. But in other ways, life in Richmond isn't so different from that in the big city, with its Walmart and fast-food joints, check-cashing businesses and strip-center sprawl." As of 2006 several strip malls are along U.S. Route 59 south of town. During the same year, the community included tack stores, two-lane blacktop roads, and horse ranches. John P. Lopez of the Houston Chronicle said, "Richmond is a city of contradiction and transition. It's as if the place is not sure if it wants to be a part of Houston's bustle or remain a slow-paced farm and ranch town. It tries to be both," and, "It is part Acres Homes, part Fort Bend County Fair."

=== Communities ===
The wealthiest neighborhood, as of 2003, in Richmond is Hillcrest. Winston Terrace, another neighborhood, had its first houses built in 1940. Construction increased around the end of World War II. Most of the houses were built between 1940 and 1965. Jeannie Kever of the Houston Chronicle said that Winston Terrace is "a swath of mid-20th-century America, with sweeping oak trees and colorful brick or wood bungalows, named for the descendants of one of the region's most illustrious pioneers."

"Mud Alley" as of 1985 had older bars and strip clubs. Mud Alley is located in an area which, in 1985, housed most of the African Americans in Richmond. As of 1993 many police raids for drugs occurred in "Mud Alley". "Mud Alley" was known by several other nicknames, including "Little Boomtown". Historically, the area had a lot of recreational drugs.

=== Unincorporated areas of Richmond ===
The proximity to affordable and cheap land located off of the Grand Parkway (SH 99) and the Westpark tollway has allowed for multiple master planned communities to be built and take shape. These communities in the 77406 and 77407 zip codes have Richmond addresses, but are not provided any city services since they are unincorporated and in the Extraterritorial jurisdiction (ETJ) of the city of Houston. The respective MUD districts of the neighborhoods provide water, sewer and fire services. Fort Bend County Sheriffs department and local constables provide police support.

These communities include: Pecan Grove, Texas, The Lakes of Bella Terra, Long Meadow Farms, Lakemont, Aliana, Grand Mission, Grand Mission Estates, Grand Vista, Twin Oaks Village, Fieldstone, Mission Trace, Mission Sierra, Waterside Estates, Candela, Deer Run Meadows, McCrary Meadows, Mandola Farms, and Harvest Green, among others. Multiple mass merchandisers and restaurants have opened locations along the grand parkway and this area continues to grow by leaps and bounds. Estimates are there could be well over 25,000 homes and 10,000 apartment units with a population above 85,000 plus people.

This area of unincorporated Richmond, in Fort Bend County, is split among precinct 3 and precinct 4 for voting purposes, and also split among US house districts 7 (Lizzie Fletcher, D) and district 22 (Troy Nehls, R)

=== Climate ===
Climate data for Richmond, TX
| Month | Jan | Feb | Mar | Apr | May | Jun | Jul | Aug | Sep | Oct | Nov | Dec | Year |
|---|---|---|---|---|---|---|---|---|---|---|---|---|---|
| Record high °F (°C) | 84 (29) | 89 (32) | 92 (33) | 95 (35) | 99 (37) | 102 (39) | 105 (41) | 105 (41) | 108 (42) | 98 (37) | 91 (33) | 90 (32) | 108 (42) |
| Mean daily maximum °F (°C) | 65 (18) | 68 (20) | 74 (23) | 81 (27) | 88 (31) | 93 (34) | 95 (35) | 96 (36) | 91 (33) | 84 (29) | 75 (24) | 67 (19) | 81.4 (27.4) |
| Daily mean °F (°C) | 55 (13) | 58 (14) | 64 (18) | 71 (22) | 79 (26) | 84 (29) | 86 (30) | 87 (31) | 81 (27) | 74 (23) | 65 (18) | 56 (13) | 71.7 (22.1) |
| Mean daily minimum °F (°C) | 44 (7) | 48 (9) | 53 (12) | 61 (16) | 69 (21) | 75 (24) | 77 (25) | 77 (25) | 71 (22) | 63 (17) | 54 (12) | 45 (7) | 61.4 (16.3) |
| Record low °F (°C) | 6 (−14) | 9 (−13) | 21 (−6) | 32 (0) | 47 (8) | 56 (13) | 63 (17) | 60 (16) | 47 (8) | 30 (−1) | 22 (−6) | 6 (−14) | 6 (−14) |
| Average rainfall inches (mm) | 3.55 (90) | 3.18 (81) | 3.43 (87) | 3.36 (85) | 4.30 (109) | 5.65 (144) | 3.97 (101) | 4.43 (113) | 5.10 (130) | 5.28 (134) | 4.84 (123) | 3.37 (86) | 50.46 (1,282) |

== Demographics ==
Historical population
| Census | Pop. | Note | %± |
|---|---|---|---|
| 1870 | 816 | | — |
| 1880 | 1,156 | | 41.7% |
| 1890 | 993 | | −14.1% |
| 1910 | 1,371 | | — |
| 1920 | 1,273 | | −7.1% |
| 1930 | 1,432 | | 12.5% |
| 1940 | 2,026 | | 41.5% |
| 1950 | 2,030 | | 0.2% |
| 1960 | 3,668 | | 80.7% |
| 1970 | 5,777 | | 57.5% |
| 1980 | 9,692 | | 67.8% |
| 1990 | 9,801 | | 1.1% |
| 2000 | 11,081 | | 13.1% |
| 2010 | 11,679 | | 5.4% |
| 2020 | 11,627 | | −0.4% |
U.S. Decennial Census

=== Racial and ethnic composition ===
Richmond city, Texas – Racial and ethnic composition Note: the US Census treats Hispanic/Latino as an ethnic category. This table excludes Latinos from the racial categories and assigns them to a separate category. Hispanics/Latinos may be of any race.
| Race / Ethnicity (NH = Non-Hispanic) | Pop 2000 | Pop 2010 | Pop 2020 | % 2000 | % 2010 | % 2020 |
|---|---|---|---|---|---|---|
| White alone (NH) | 2,964 | 2,951 | 2,625 | 26.75% | 25.27% | 22.58% |
| Black or African American alone (NH) | 1,482 | 2,023 | 1,949 | 13.37% | 17.32% | 16.76% |
| Native American or Alaska Native alone (NH) | 11 | 34 | 8 | 0.10% | 0.29% | 0.07% |
| Asian alone (NH) | 59 | 121 | 213 | 0.53% | 1.04% | 1.83% |
| Native Hawaiian or Pacific Islander alone (NH) | 3 | 1 | 3 | 0.03% | 0.01% | 0.03% |
| Other race alone (NH) | 4 | 9 | 27 | 0.04% | 0.08% | 0.23% |
| Mixed race or Multiracial (NH) | 52 | 68 | 165 | 0.47% | 0.58% | 1.42% |
| Hispanic or Latino (any race) | 6,506 | 6,472 | 6,637 | 58.71% | 55.42% | 57.08% |
| Total | 11,081 | 11,679 | 11,627 | 100.00% | 100.00% | 100.00% |

=== 2020 census ===
As of the 2020 census, Richmond had a population of 11,627 and a median age of 36.5 years. 24.3% of residents were under the age of 18 and 15.7% of residents were 65 years of age or older. For every 100 females there were 104.8 males, and for every 100 females age 18 and over there were 103.3 males age 18 and over.

98.8% of residents lived in urban areas, while 1.2% lived in rural areas.

There were 3,943 households in Richmond, of which 34.7% had children under the age of 18 living in them. Of all households, 41.4% were married-couple households, 19.1% were households with a male householder and no spouse or partner present, and 34.0% were households with a female householder and no spouse or partner present. About 25.8% of all households were made up of individuals and 10.4% had someone living alone who was 65 years of age or older. Of those households, 2,668 were families.

There were 4,312 housing units, of which 8.6% were vacant. The homeowner vacancy rate was 1.4% and the rental vacancy rate was 9.5%.

Racial composition as of the 2020 census
| Race | Number | Percent |
|---|---|---|
| White | 4,153 | 35.7% |
| Black or African American | 2,047 | 17.6% |
| American Indian and Alaska Native | 130 | 1.1% |
| Asian | 221 | 1.9% |
| Native Hawaiian and Other Pacific Islander | 9 | 0.1% |
| Some other race | 3,254 | 28.0% |
| Two or more races | 1,813 | 15.6% |
| Hispanic or Latino (of any race) | 6,637 | 57.1% |

=== 2000 census ===
As of the census of 2000, there were 11,081 people, 3,413 households, and 2,628 families residing in the city. The population density was 2,975.4 inhabitants per square mile (1,148.8/km^{2}). There were 3,595 housing units at an average density of 965.3 per square mile (372.7/km^{2}). The racial makeup of the city was 51.20% White, 10.55% African American, 0.63% Native American, 3.53% Asian, 0.07% Pacific Islander, 31.00% from other races, and 3.01% from two or more races. Hispanic or Latino of any race were 58.71% of the population.

There were 3,413 households, out of which 39.6% had children under the age of 18 living with them, 53.6% were married couples living together, 16.4% had a female householder with no husband present, and 23.0% were non-families. 18.7% of all households were made up of individuals, and 6.7% had someone living alone who was 65 years of age or older. The average household size was 3.16 and the average family size was 3.60.

In the city, the population was spread out, with 31.6% under the age of 18, 11.0% from 18 to 24, 28.5% from 25 to 44, 18.7% from 45 to 64, and 10.1% who were 65 years of age or older. The median age was 30 years. For every 100 females, there were 98.1 males. For every 100 females age 18 and over, there were 95.2 males.

The median income for a household in the city was $34,888, and the median income for a family was $35,801. Males had a median income of $27,457 versus $22,723 for females. The per capita income for the city was $15,195. About 17.0% of families and 20.0% of the population were below the poverty line, including 30.4% of those under age 18 and 12.9% of those age 65 or over.

== Economy ==
The Texas Department of Criminal Justice operates the Jester State Prison Farm units, including the Jester I Unit, the Carol Vance Unit (formerly the Jester II Unit), the Jester III Unit, and the Wayne Scott Unit (formerly the Jester IV Unit), in an unincorporated area 4 miles (6.4 km) east of Richmond.

== Arts and culture ==
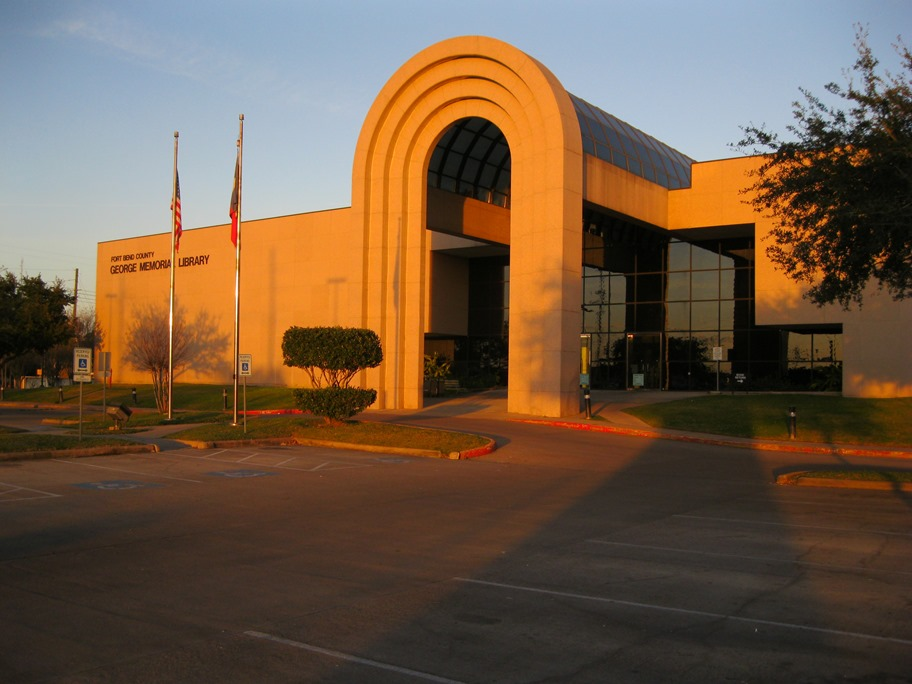
George Memorial Library

=== Public libraries ===
Fort Bend County Libraries operates the George Memorial Library, the central library and the site of the administrative offices of the library system, located along Farm to Market Road 762. Richmond also has the Fort Bend County Law Library.

The Main Library moved from Rosenberg to its current location in Richmond in 1986. The George Foundation funded the 77,000 square feet (7,200 m^{2}) library facility, designed by Ronald Wedemeyer Associates and built on 6 acres (2.4 ha) of land. When the library opened, it had unfinished areas to facilitate future expansion. In December 1989 the Commissioners Court of Fort Bend County, in accordance with Texas Local Government code §323.021(a), ordered the construction of a law library. The main library expansion and the 1991 installation of an automation system used funds from the 1989 bond election, and expansion occurred on 1995 and 2002. The 2002 expansion included the addition of two conference rooms.

== Government ==
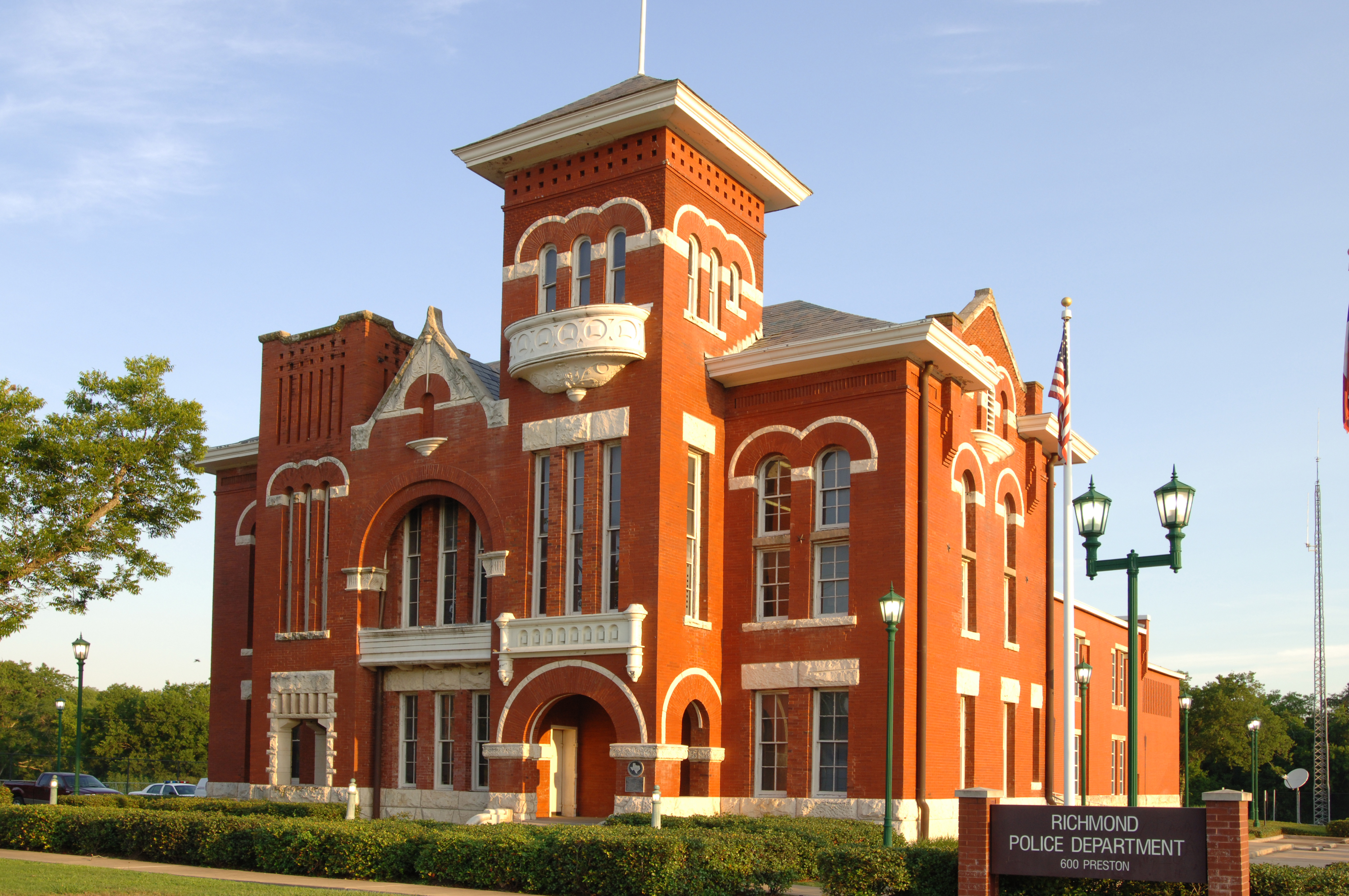
Richmond Police Department is in the old jail

The United States Postal Service Richmond Post Office is located at 5560 Farm to Market Road 1640.

The city is governed by a mayor and four commissioners elected at large for two-year terms. The commission sets policy and the day-to-day management is done by a city manager hired by the commission.

Hilmar G. Moore served as mayor from 1949 until his death on December 4, 2012 and was believed to be the longest-serving mayor in the United States. Rebecca "Becky" Haas is currently the mayor.

== Education ==
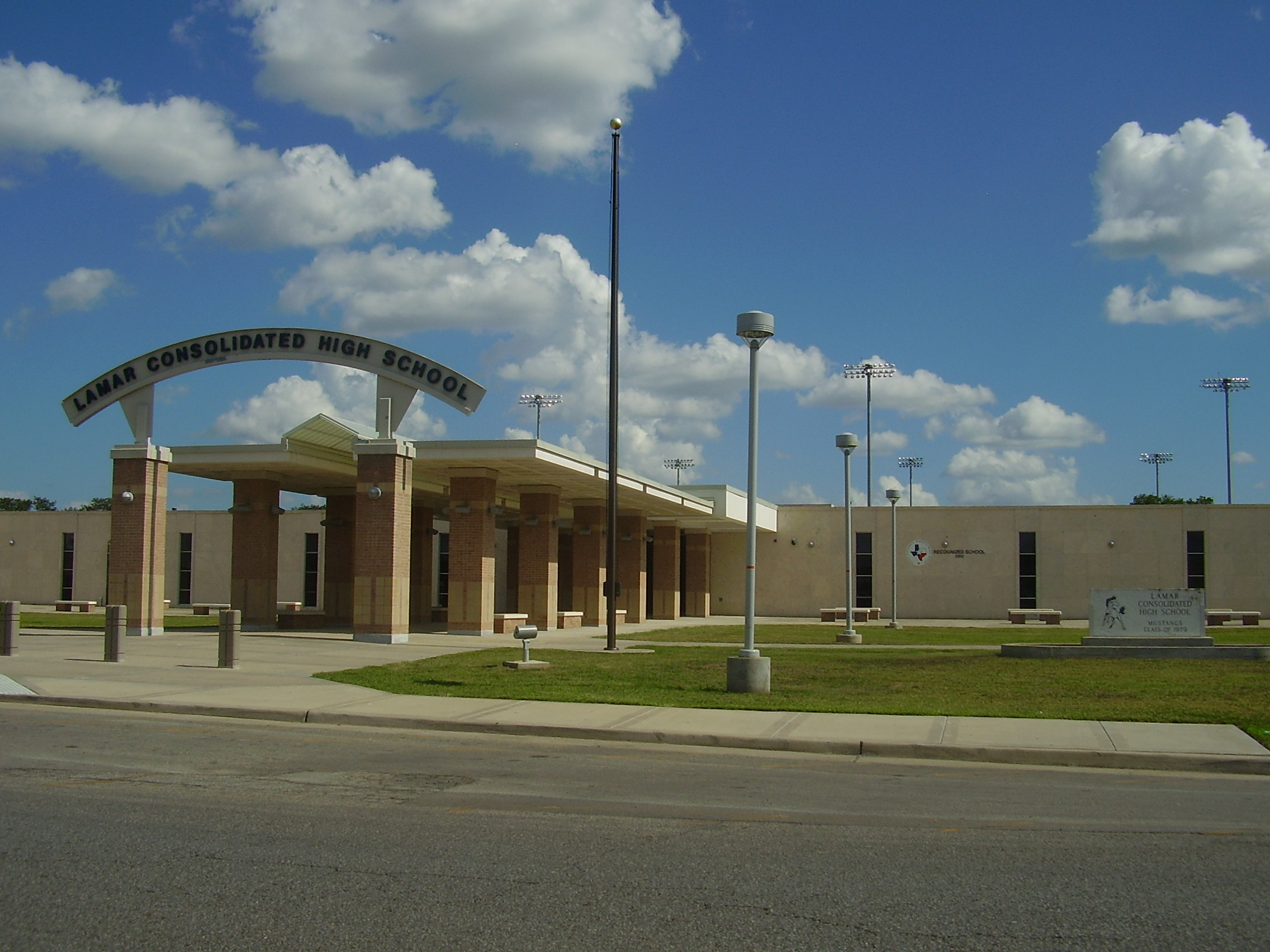
Lamar Consolidated High School

Children living within the corporate city limits of Richmond are served by Lamar Consolidated Independent School District.

Elementary schools within the Richmond city limits include Jane Long, Pink, and Smith.

Wessendorff Middle School, Lamar Junior High School, and Lamar Consolidated High School serve students living within the Richmond city limits. The three schools are in Rosenberg.

Various schools operated by LCISD and neighboring Fort Bend Independent School District bear Richmond addresses, but do not serve the city limits of Richmond. George Ranch High School, Foster High School, Reading Junior High School, and Briscoe Junior High in LCISD and Travis High School and Bush High School in the Fort Bend Independent School District (FBISD) bear "Richmond, Texas" addresses.

The designated community college for LCISD is Wharton County Junior College.

== Infrastructure ==
=== Transportation ===
Fort Bend County Public Transportation provides local bus service in Richmond.

== Notable people ==
- Troy Nehls – U.S. representative, former Sheriff of Fort Bend County
- Hilmar G. Moore - Longest serving mayor in the United States.

== See also ==
- John M. and Lottie D. Moore House
