= Hilmar Moore =

American politician (1920–2012)

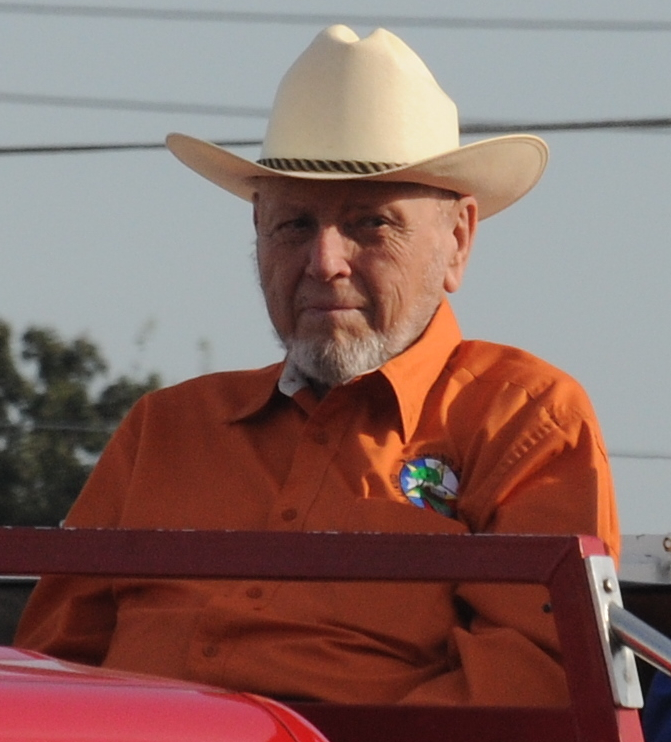
- Moore in September 2012

Mayor of Richmond, Texas
- In office September 22, 1949 – December 4, 2012
- Preceded by: Wilbert Lee Ansel
- Succeeded by: Evalyn W. Moore

Personal details
- Born: Hilmar Guenther Moore; July 28, 1920 San Antonio, Texas, U.S.
- Died: December 4, 2012 (aged 92) Richmond, Texas, U.S.
- Party: Independent
- Spouses: Hallie Kelley Peareson (died 1982) Evalyn W. Moore (m. 1984)
- Parents: John M. Moore Jr. (father); Dorothea Guenther Moore (mother)
- Education: University of Texas School of Law
- Known for: Longest-serving mayor in Texas

Military service
- Allegiance: United States
- Branch/service: United States Army Air Corps
- Years of service: 1942–1945
- Unit: 4th Emergency Rescue Squadron
- Battles/wars: World War II; Battle of Saipan; Battle of Iwo Jima

Hilmar Guenther Moore (/ˈhɪlmər ˈɡʊnθər/; July 28, 1920 – December 4, 2012) was an American rancher and long-time mayor of Richmond, Texas, for over 60 years. He was the longest-serving mayor in both Texas and the United States.

== Biography ==
Hilmar Moore was a cattleman and a fifth-generation Texan, the great-great grandson of a signer of the Texas Declaration of Independence, and grandson of U.S. congressman John Matthew Moore. His maternal great grandfather was Carl Hilmar Guenther. Moore's father John Matthew Moore Jr. also served as Mayor of Richmond. Moore served in World War II. Moore was married twice; first to Hallie Kelley Peareson who predeceased him and second to Evalyn Wendt Moore, who succeeded him as mayor.

== Mayor of Richmond ==
Moore was first appointed to fill an unexpired term as mayor of Richmond in September 1949 and won 32 elections, remaining in office until his death in 2012. He was opposed fewer than 10 times. He won against his last opponent in 1996 in a 337 to 42 vote. Moore is believed to be the longest-serving elected official in the United States. A 2008 BBC News report referred to him as "probably the longest-serving elected official in the U.S.", though even as late as 2012 Richmond only described him as the longest serving mayor in Texas, and the second in the US.

In the segregated 1950s and 1960s, Moore persuaded restaurants in Richmond to integrate. He was president of the Texas and Southwestern Cattle Raisers Association from 1974 to 1976. In 1976, Moore registered as both a Republican and a Democrat.

He was honored with a life-size statue at City Hall in October 2008.

Moore's father, John Jr., served as a two-term Mayor of Richmond and a two-term judge in Fort Bend County, Texas. Hilmar's grandfather, John Sr., was a U.S. congressman and member of Texas House of Representatives.

== Chair of Texas Welfare Board ==
Moore was appointed to the Department of Human Resources by Texas Governor Dolph Briscoe. In 1980, a controversy erupted when Moore voiced his view that welfare parents should be sterilized.

== Death ==
Moore died on December 4, 2012. A memorial service was held on December 10. Pete Olson and Tom DeLay were two of many political figures who attended his funeral.

His widow, Evalyn W. Moore, was appointed to serve out the remainder of his term. She was reelected in 2014 and 2017, but was defeated by Rebecca Kennelly Haas in the 2020 mayoral election.

Texas House Resolution No. 2103 was passed in his honor.
