= Beauford H. Jester Complex =

Harlem
- Unincorporated community
- Beauford H. Jester Complex
- Location within the state of Texas
- Coordinates: 29°35′57″N 95°42′46″W
- Country: United States
- State: Texas
- County: Fort Bend
- Elevation: 79 ft (24 m)
- Time zone: UTC-6 (Central (CST))
  - Summer (DST): UTC-5 (CDT)
- ZIP codes: 77406
- Area codes: 713, 281, and 832
- GNIS feature ID: 1378416

The Beauford H. Jester Complex, formerly the Jester State Prison Farm, refers to a complex of Texas Department of Criminal Justice prisons for men in unincorporated Fort Bend County, Texas, United States. Individually they are Jester I Unit, Carol Vance Unit (Jester II Unit), Jester III Unit, and Wayne Scott Unit (Jester IV Unit).

Texas State Highway 99 (Grand Parkway) bisects the prison property. Cornfields surround the Jester property.

A portion of the property is within the Pecan Grove CDP.

== History ==
Previously the complex was known as Harlem, the Harlem Prison Farm, or the Harlem Plantation. The state of Texas purchased the prison farm property in 1885 or 1886. Previously several private plantations based here used convict leasing for labor. This system has been called "slavery by another name", as lessees operated with little oversight by the state as to their treatment of convicts. The plantations included the Harlem Plantation and several adjacent tracts of land. The state essentially assigned room and board to employers who leased convicts; it had few prisons until late in the 19th century.

In 1885 the state opened Harlem I Unit and Harlem II Unit. From July 20, 1888 to August 31, 1907 a post office was located on the prison farm. After the post office closed, the post office in Richmond, Texas handled mail for the prison farm.

In 1908 the State of Texas bought the Riddick Plantation, which was next to the Harlem property. The state incorporated that property into the Harlem Farm.

In September 1913 several prison guards in one of the units punished twelve African-American prisoners by placing them in a 9 feet 3 inches (2.82 m) long, 7 feet 3.5 inches (2.223 m) wide, and 6 feet 11.5 inches (2.121 m) high enclosure called "The Hole." The temperature in the enclosure went over 100 °F (38 °C), and convicts asked the guards to let them out. The guards did not let them out, and 8 of the 12 convicts died of suffocation and heat.

In 1925 the prison farm had 5,005 acres (2,025 ha) of land. During that year it had 260 prisoners. The complex was renamed in the 1950s after Governor of Texas Beauford H. Jester.

A spur track of the Galveston, Harrisburg and San Antonio Railway opened at the prison farm to load and unload sugarcane that was produced at the farm. The railroad line closed in 1929.

The state expanded the facilities, opening Jester III Unit in July 1982. Jester IV Unit opened in November 1993.

Jester IV Unit was renamed to Wayne Scott Unit in 2021.

== Representation in other media ==
Steven Spielberg's first theatrical release, The Sugarland Express (1974), was set in and partially filmed at the prison complex.

== Gallery ==
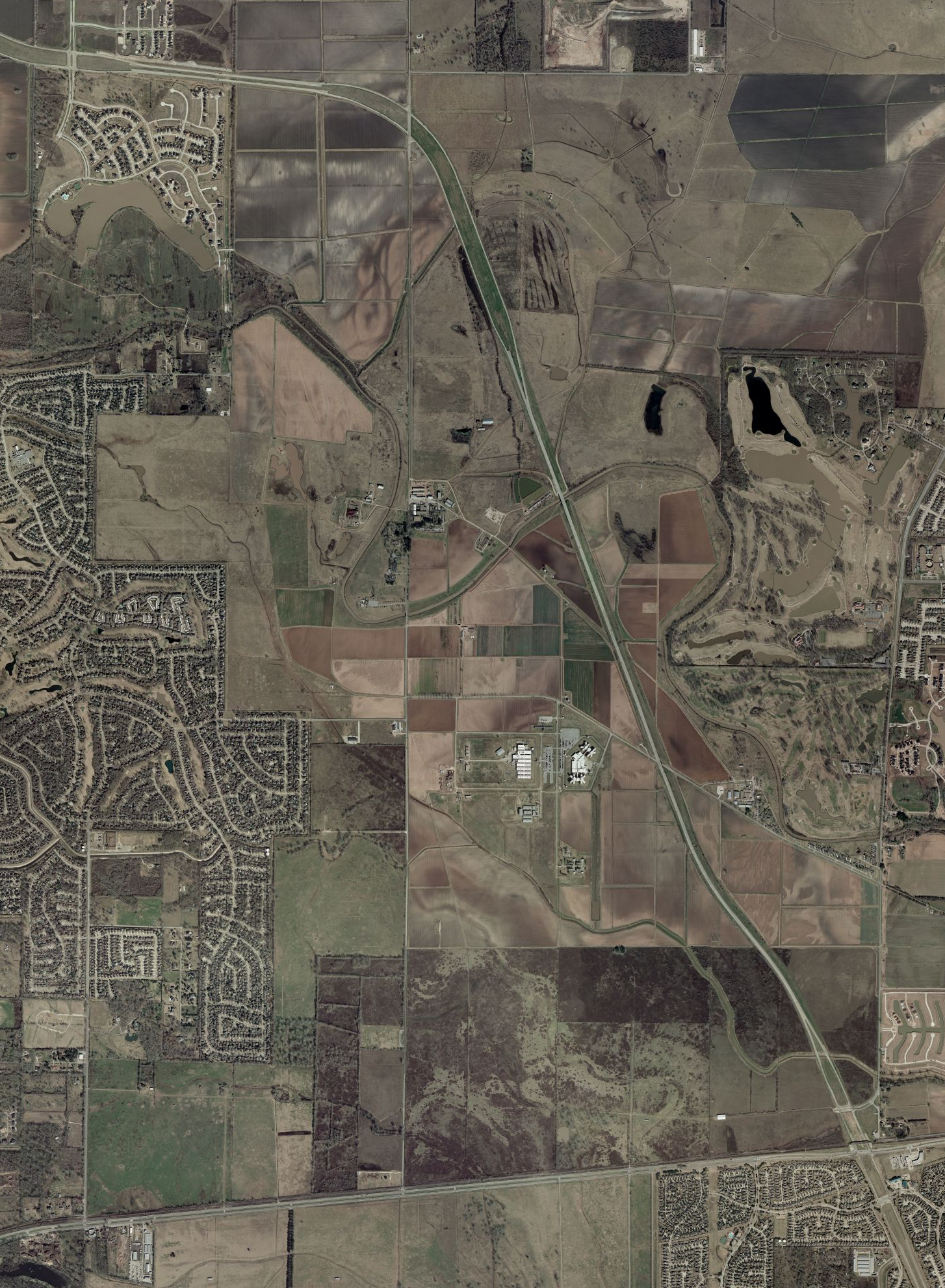
Aerial view of the Jester State Prison Farm, January 27, 2002, U.S. Geographic Survey

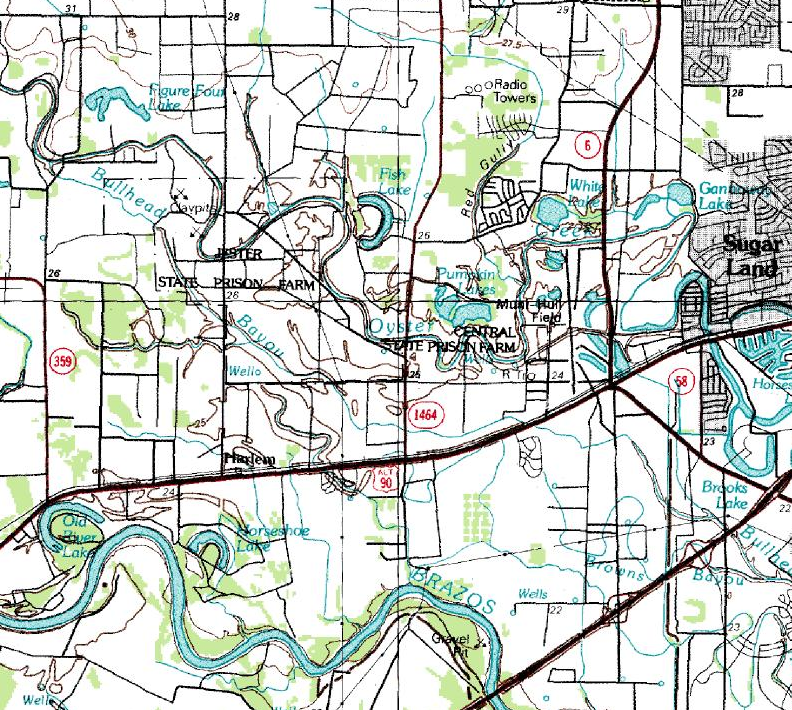
Topographical map of the Jester Prison Farm, the Central Prison Farm, and Sugar Land Regional Airport, July 1, 1990, U.S. Geological Survey
