= Retrieve Unit =

Prison farm in Texas, United States

Retrieve Unit (later Wayne Scott Unit)
- Location in Texas
- Location: 6999 Retrieve Angleton, Texas postal address 77515; 29.0916667°N 095.4813889°W
- Status: Operational
- Security class: G1-G4, Administrative Segregation, Outside Trusty
- Capacity: Unit: 809 Trusty Camp: 321
- Opened: September 1919
- Closed: Main prison: 2020; Trusty camp: Not stated
- Former name: Retrieve Unit
- Managed by: TDCJ Correctional Institutions Division
- Warden: Donald Muniz, Assistant Warden Richard Waldron
- Website: www.tdcj.state.tx.us/unit_directory../rv.html

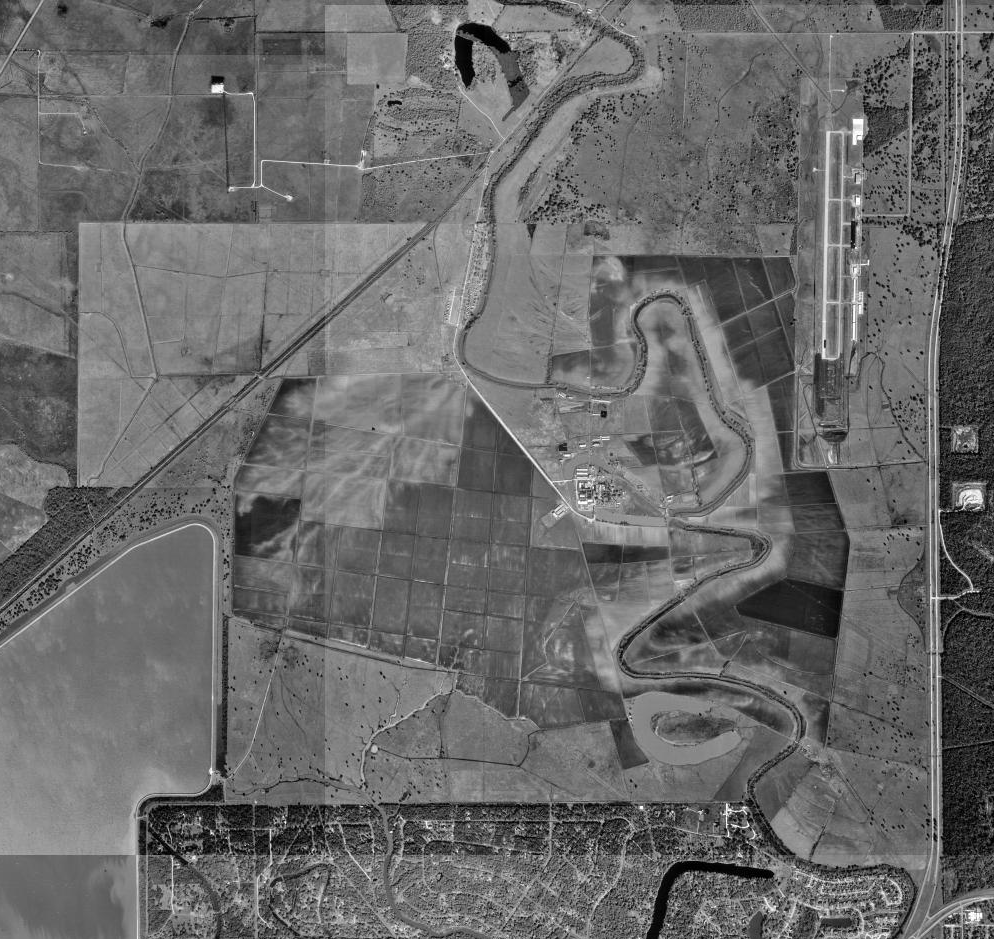
Aerial view of the Retrieve Unit and Brazoria County Airport, January 23, 1995 - U.S. Geological Survey

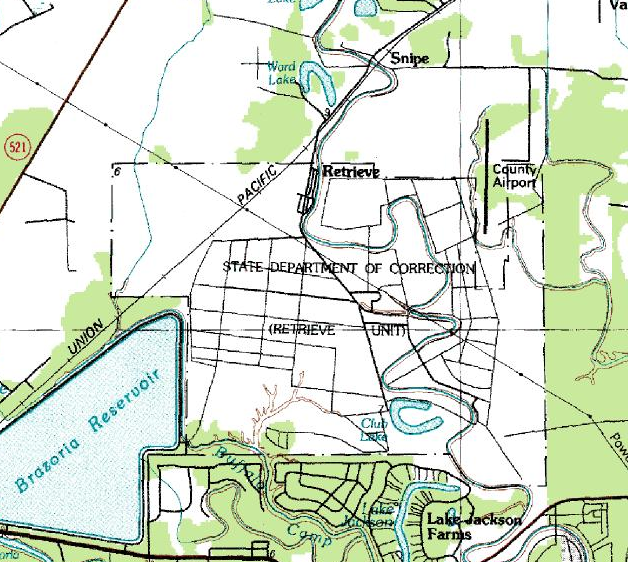
Topographical map of the Retrieve Unit and Brazoria County Airport, July 1, 1984 - U.S. Geological Survey

The Retrieve Unit (TDCJ code: RV), later the Wayne Scott Unit, was a Texas Department of Criminal Justice (TDCJ) prison farm located in unincorporated Brazoria County, Texas. The unit, southwest of Houston, was along County Road 290, 8 miles (13 km) south of Angleton. Scott, which was established in September 1919, had about 5,766 acres (2,333 ha) of land.

== History ==
The prison was formerly known as the Retrieve Unit. The prison opened on the grounds of the former Retrieve Plantation, which opened in 1839. The final main building opened in the 1930s.

In 1935 Retrieve housed White prisoners. In 1963, before racial desegregation occurred, the facility housed second offenders, habitual criminals, and African Americans over the age of 25. A post office in the nearby community of Snipe served the prison farm from 1921 to 1949.

The prison received its final name, Wayne Scott Unit, on February 1, 2002, after a former TDCJ executive director.

In September 2018, some 45 boxes of unclaimed bananas were donated to the Scott Unit. and the boxes were found to contain 540 packages of cocaine, which at the time held a street value of US$17,820,000.

In 2020 307 people worked at Wayne Scott. The main prison unit was scheduled to end operations by late 2020. According to Bryan Collier, the executive director of the prison agency, the cost to revamp the main building would exceed $30,000,000. The trusty camp at that time remained open. As of 2023 the TDCJ no longer lists the former Retrieve Unit. In 2021 the Jester IV Unit in Fort Bend County was renamed the Wayne Scott Unit.
