= Carol Vance Unit =

Prison in Fort Bend County, Texas

Carol S. Vance Unit
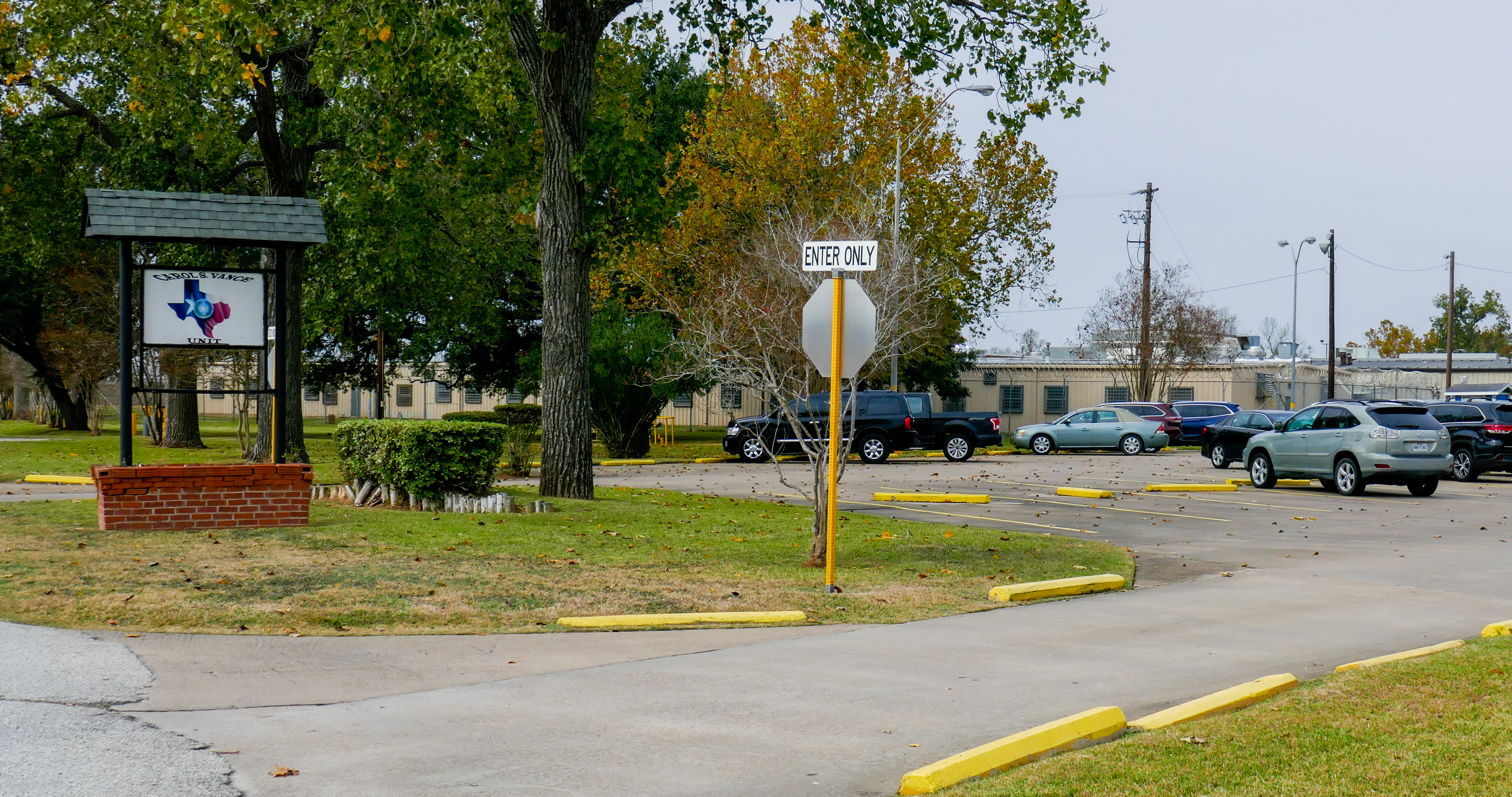

- Location in Texas
- Location: 2 Jester Road Richmond, Texas 77406; 29.6227667°N 095.7067667°W
- Status: Operational
- Security class: G1, G2
- Capacity: 378
- Opened: 1855 - Brick Building 1933
- Former name: Harlem II Unit; Jester II Unit
- Managed by: TDCJ Correctional Institutions Division
- Warden: Amber Ochoa
- Website: www.tdcj.state.tx.us/unit_directory../j2.html

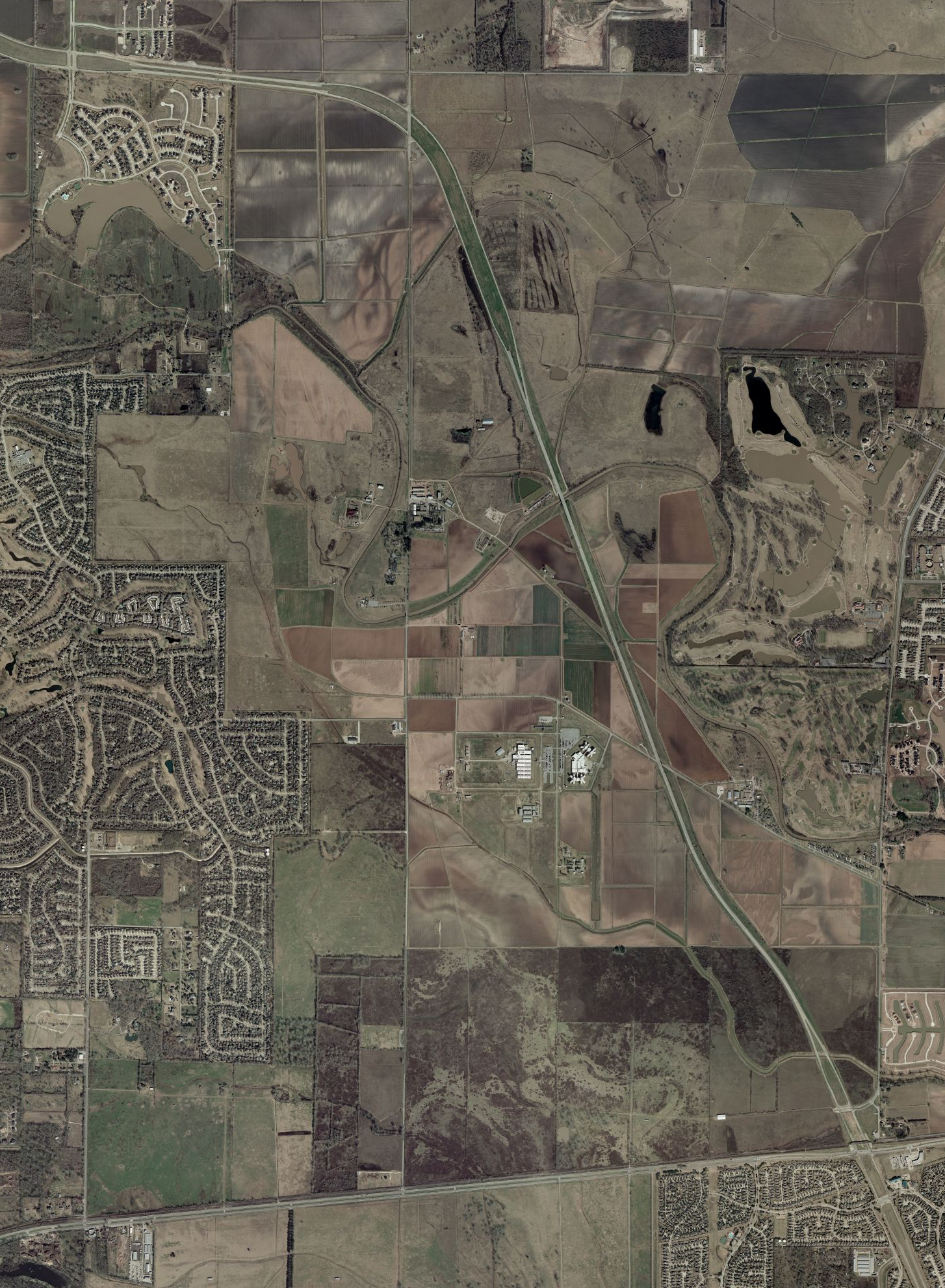
Aerial view of the Jester State Prison Farm, January 27, 2002, U.S. Geographic Survey

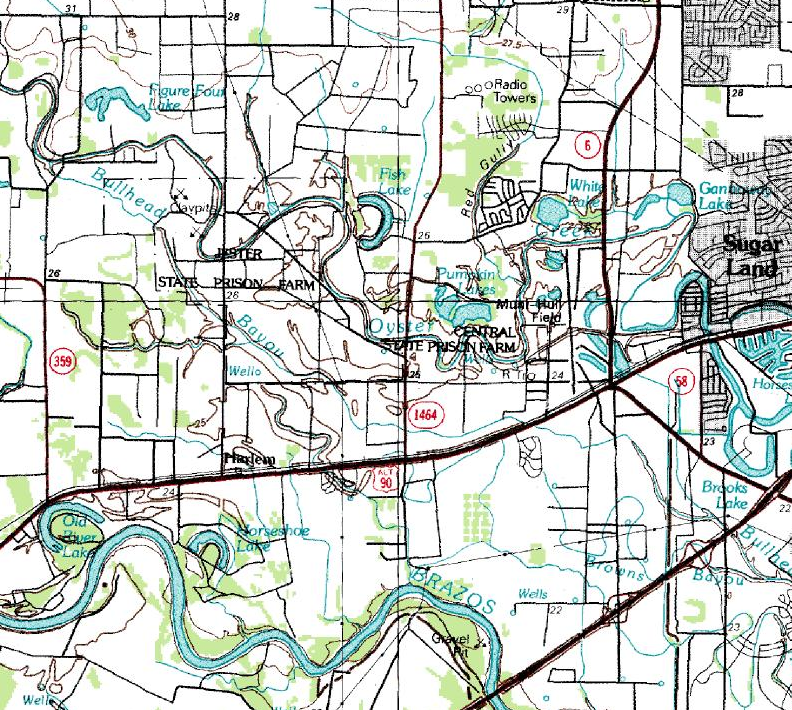
Topographical map of the Jester Prison Farm, the Central Prison Farm, and Sugar Land Regional Airport, July 1, 1990, U.S. Geological Survey

Carol S. Vance Unit (J2, previously the Harlem II Unit and the Jester II Unit) is a Texas Department of Criminal Justice (TDCJ) prison located in unincorporated central Fort Bend County, Texas, United States. The unit, located in flatlands, is along U.S. Highway 90A, 4 miles (6.4 km) east of central Richmond. The facility is in proximity to Sugar Land, and it is about 20 miles (32 km) southwest of Downtown Houston. The unit, with about 940 acres (380 ha) of land, is co-located with Jester I Unit, Jester III Unit, and Jester IV Unit. The unit consists of four steel buildings and two brick buildings. The prison is the home of the Prison Fellowship Academy (formerly known as the "InnerChange Freedom Initiative") Christian prison program. It is located on the Jester State Prison Farm property.

== History ==
The unit opened in 1885. Its first brick building was in 1933. The unit was originally known as the Harlem II Unit, and at a later point it became the Jester II Unit. In 1963, before racial desegregation occurred, the facility housed Hispanic and Latino Americans over the age of 25. The unit was named after Governor of Texas Beauford H. Jester.

Carol Vance, a former Harris County district attorney and the chairperson of the Texas Board of Criminal Justice, asked state officials to implement the first Christian faith-based prison program at Jester II. State officials began to implement the program in 1996. The InnerChange Freedom Initiative (IFI) program, which was operated by Prison Fellowship Ministries and was founded by Charles Colson, first came to Jester II in April 1997. The TDCJ selected Vance due to its location in Greater Houston as aftercare resources for released prisoners and volunteer recruitment were centered in the Houston area. The program was modeled after a Christian-based prison program in Brazil.

The Texas Board of Criminal Justice voted to rename the Jester II Unit to the Carol Vance Unit. On Wednesday September 15, 1999, the Jester II Unit was officially renamed the Carol Vance Unit during ceremonies beginning at 10:30 AM that day.

By 2010, due to the expansion of Greater Houston, housing developments have appeared within a close proximity to the prison grounds. Many custom houses are adjacent to the unit; some are worth about one million dollars each.

== Facility ==
Jesse Hyde of the Dallas Observer said that Vance "looks like any other minimum-security prison in Texas—a cluster of brick buildings, a fence topped with razor wire, a group of inmates loitering in the yard." However the interior is decorated differently than in other prisons; for instance the walls have murals depicting events in Christianity, including the Crucifixion of Jesus and an apocalyptic vision from the Book of Revelation.

== Operations ==
In the Vance Unit, the State of Texas operates services regarding to the safety and physical care of the prisoners, while the Innerchange Freedom Initiative operates all of the programming.

=== IFI program ===
The InnerChange Freedom Initiative (IFI) program is operated with no additional cost to Texas taxpayers. As of 2002 the IFI program had 179 participants, with the program occupying 200 of the 378 beds in the Vance Unit. Incoming inmates complete a 30-day self-study orientation.

As of 2010 the eligible groups of inmates allowed to participate are those expected to be released in the Greater Houston and the Dallas/Fort Worth Metroplex areas, and the program has space for 300 men. As of 2004 the only group offenders that may participate in the IFI program were those who were expected to be released in Harris County or counties surrounding Harris County. Inmates who volunteer for the program must be classified at the minimum security custody level. Inmates are required to speak the English language, be within three years of release, and have a good behavior record. Sex offenders are not permitted to participate, as IFI program participants are required to do community work.

Atheists, Christians, Jews, and Muslims have enrolled in IFI. Jerry Bryan, a chaplain in the program, said that most IFI graduates become Christians.

== Prisoner life ==
Scott Nowell of the Houston Press said in 2003 that in the prison, "fights are virtually unheard of, the guards are friendly, and the living conditions are as good or better than any prison in Texas." Prisoners referred to Vance as a "Cadillac Unit." Jesse Hyde of the Dallas Observer said "Visitors have remarked that the Vance Unit feels more like a Bible college than a prison." Hyde added that inmates "carry Bibles as if they were prison-issue" and "talk incessantly of Jesus." According to Hyde, many prisoners awaken in the early morning to pray and study scripture. Hyde added "it is not uncommon to see men of various races, marked with tattoos of rival prison gangs, circled together to pray."

Nowell stated that a Houston prisoner who may be in a faraway prison would be attracted to Vance because of its proximity to the city. Nowell added that another possible motivation for going to Vance was the air conditioned classrooms. Some TDCJ prisoners believed that a person who declined the opportunity to volunteer for the InnerChange Freedom Initiative program would be denied parole.

=== IFI life ===
The 15-hour days of InnerChange Freedom Initiative participants are dominated by Christian beliefs. Many Bible study sessions are held. For instance the Alcoholics Anonymous meetings directly refer to Jesus instead of using the phrase "higher power." The program considers drug addiction to be a sin instead of a disease. The program tells prisoners that homosexuality, masturbation, and premarital sexual intercourse are sins that will draw people back into criminal behavior. The program cautions prisoners against using Dungeons & Dragons, horoscopes, and Ouija boards. In order to graduate from IFI, one has to be employed for six months after he is released. Some IFI prisoners are involved in Habitat for Humanity projects.
