= Sugar Land Regional Airport =

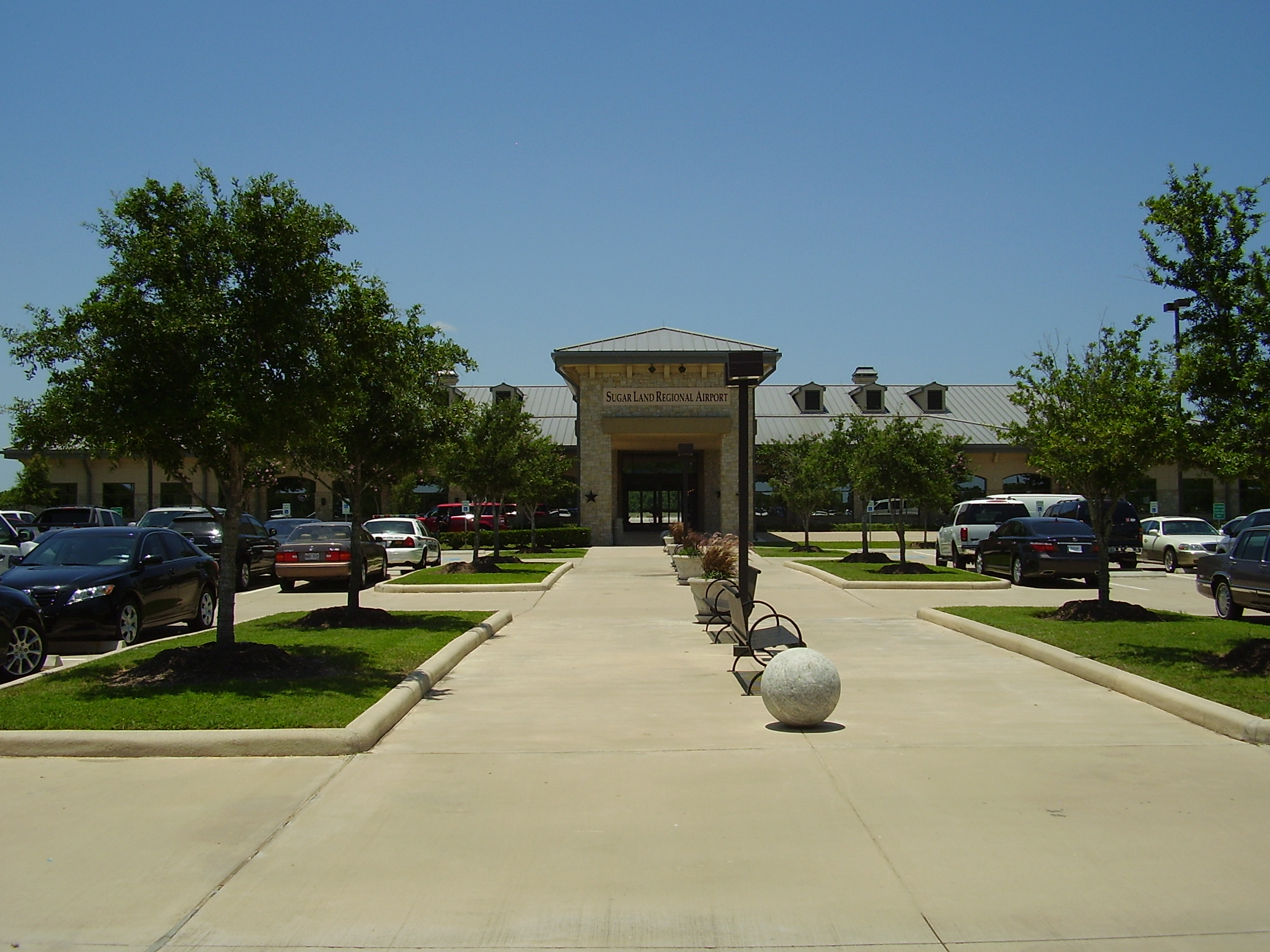
- IATA: SGR; ICAO: KSGR; FAA LID: SGR

Summary
- Airport type: Public
- Owner: City of Sugar Land
- Serves: Houston–Sugar Land–Baytown
- Location: Sugar Land, Texas, United States
- Elevation AMSL: 81 ft / 25 m
- Coordinates: 29°37′20″N 095°39′24″W
- Website: www.FlySGR.com

Map
- Location of airport in Texas SGR (the United States)

Runways
Direction	Length		Surface
Direction	ft	m	Surface
17/35	8,000	2,438	Concrete

Statistics (2023)
- Aircraft operations (year ending 2/28/2023): 43,973
- Based aircraft: 162
- Sources: airport web site and FAA

Sugar Land Regional Airport (IATA: SGR, ICAO: KSGR, FAA LID: SGR) is a city-owned public-use airport located in Sugar Land, Texas (USA), 17 miles (27 km) southwest of the central business district of Houston.

Founded privately in the early 1950s as Hull Field, it was renamed in 1990, as Sugar Land Municipal Airport when acquired by the city. As of 2009 it is the fourth-largest airport within the Houston–Sugar Land–Baytown metropolitan area and serves as a "reliever" of traffic to this airport. It handles approximately 200 aircraft operations per day during typical years, which include corporate business jet and turboprop flights.

The airport today serves the area's general aviation (GA) aircraft, serving corporate, governmental, and private clientele. It opened a new 20,000-square-foot (1,900 m^{2}) Terminal in 2006 with a 54-acre (22 ha) GA complex, including 99 T-hangars in six buildings.

The City of Sugar Land maintains Cullinan Park, which occupies 750 acres (300 ha) of land directly north and west of the Sugar Land Regional Airport, blocking expansion. The airport is surrounded by Sugar Land homes, and there is a highway and rail road track directly south of the airport, which also block its expansion. The former Central Unit, a Texas Department of Criminal Justice prison for males, was closed in 2011. It occupied land zoned for airport expansion.

== History ==
Dr. Donald "Doc" Hull was an oral surgeon who established a dental program for the Texas Department of Corrections in the early 1950s. Hull, who commuted across Southeast Texas to provide dental care to prisoners, originally operated aircraft to South Houston Airport and Sam Houston Airport. As it expanded, the City of Houston forced those airports to close. The former Sam Houston Airport was annexed as part of Houston's extraterritorial jurisdiction (ETJ) and became the Westbury area.

Hull decided to develop a regional airport more distant from Houston but to serve the area. In 1952, Hull landed his biplane in a field near Sugar Land. Afterward, with a loan from a friend, Hull purchased the property and developed a small airport.

The City of Sugar Land purchased Hull Field on December 18, 1990, and renamed the airport as "Sugar Land Municipal Airport." The City of Sugar Land opened an NFCT (non-federal control tower) that it funds and operates. This control tower manages traffic within 4 miles (6 km) of Sugar Land Airport from 6:00 a.m. to 10:00 p.m. daily.

== Past airline service ==
Several commuter airlines operated scheduled passenger service into Sugar Land Regional over the years. In the fall of 1979, Commutair was flying a "cross-town" shuttle service between the airport and Houston Intercontinental Airport (IAH), with de Havilland Canada DHC-6 Twin Otter twin turboprop aircraft operating up to twelve round-trip flights a day.

The Commutair service was replaced by Metro Airlines during the 1980s. In the summer of 1983, Metro, operating as an independent air carrier, was flying up to nine round trips a day between Sugar Land and Houston Intercontinental with Twin Otter aircraft. By early 1985, Metro Airlines had entered into a codesharing agreement with Eastern Air Lines and was flying Twin Otter aircraft as Eastern Express between the airport and IAH with up to eleven round trip flights a day.

In 1993, Austin-based Conquest Airlines announced it would begin intrastate flights from the airport to Austin (Mueller Airport), Dallas Love Field (DAL), and San Antonio. By 1994, Conquest had dropped flights to San Antonio but was still operating nonstops to Austin and Dallas. In 1995, the airline was operating three nonstop flights a day to Austin with Fairchild Swearingen Metroliner (Metro III model) propjets. By 1996, Conquest was no longer serving Sugar Land Regional.

The airport does not have any scheduled passenger airline flights at the present time.

== Current name ==
Sugar Land Regional Airport received its current name in October 2002. The airfield was formerly known as Sugar Land Municipal Airport and Hull Field. It is the fourth-largest airport in Greater Houston as of 2009, receiving annual usage from private planes of more than 100 Fortune 500 companies. TXP, Inc. released a report identifying the airport as "foremost general reliever airport in the southwest sector" and "a catalyst for corporate commerce in the Greater Houston market including the Westchase District, Uptown, and Greenway Plaza."

The airport is the fourth-largest in the Houston area, serving as a reliever for William P. Hobby Airport. As of 2010, Sugar Land Regional is the third-busiest airport in Greater Houston by number of aircraft operations.

== Facilities and aircraft ==
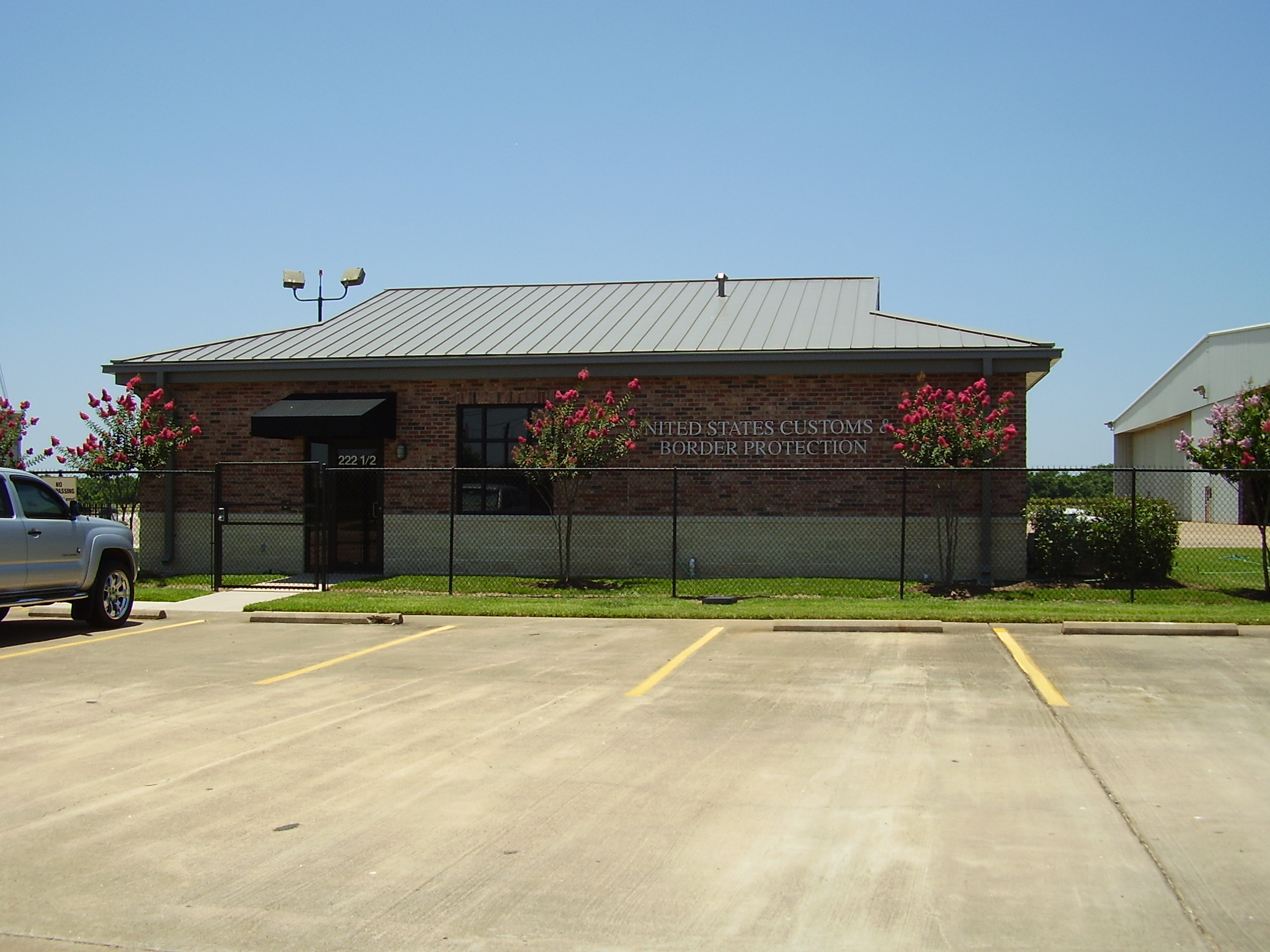
U.S. Customs and Border Protection at the airport

Sugar Land Regional Airport covers an area of 622 acres (252 ha) and contains one concrete paved runway designated 17/35 which measures 8,000 x 100 ft (2,438 x 30 m). For the 12-month period ending February 28, 2023, the airport had 43,973 aircraft operations, an average of 120 per day: 99% general aviation, and less than 1% military. In February 2023, there were 162 aircraft based at this airport: 104 single-engine, 16 multi-engine, 39 jet and 3 helicopter.

The airport includes the former Stanford Aviation hangar, described by Mimi Swartz of Texas Monthly as "impeccably landscaped." Flights from the terminal went to Antigua.

U.S. Customs and Border Protection has a small facility for incoming international flights at this airport.

== Gallery ==
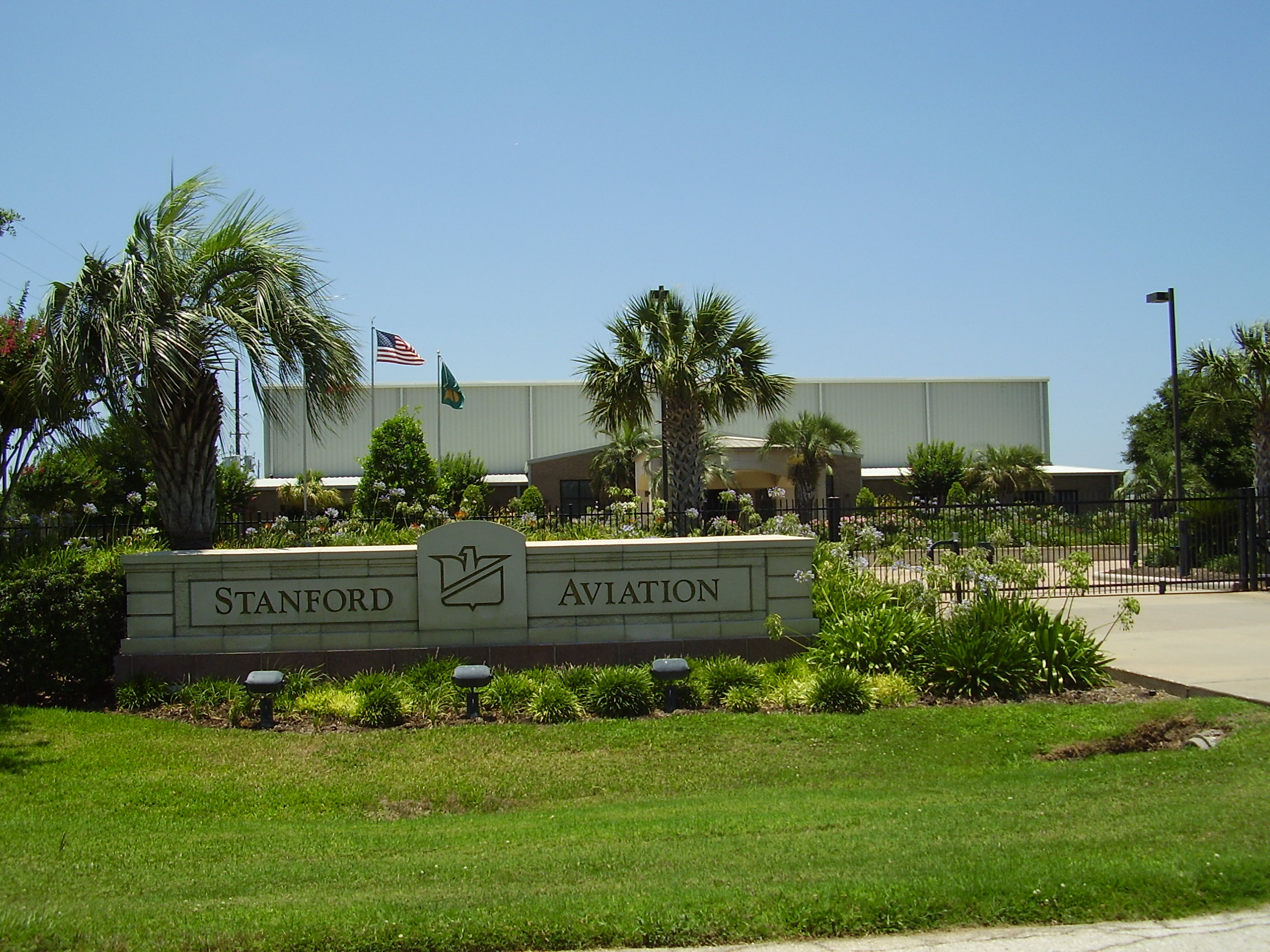
Stanford Aviation Terminal

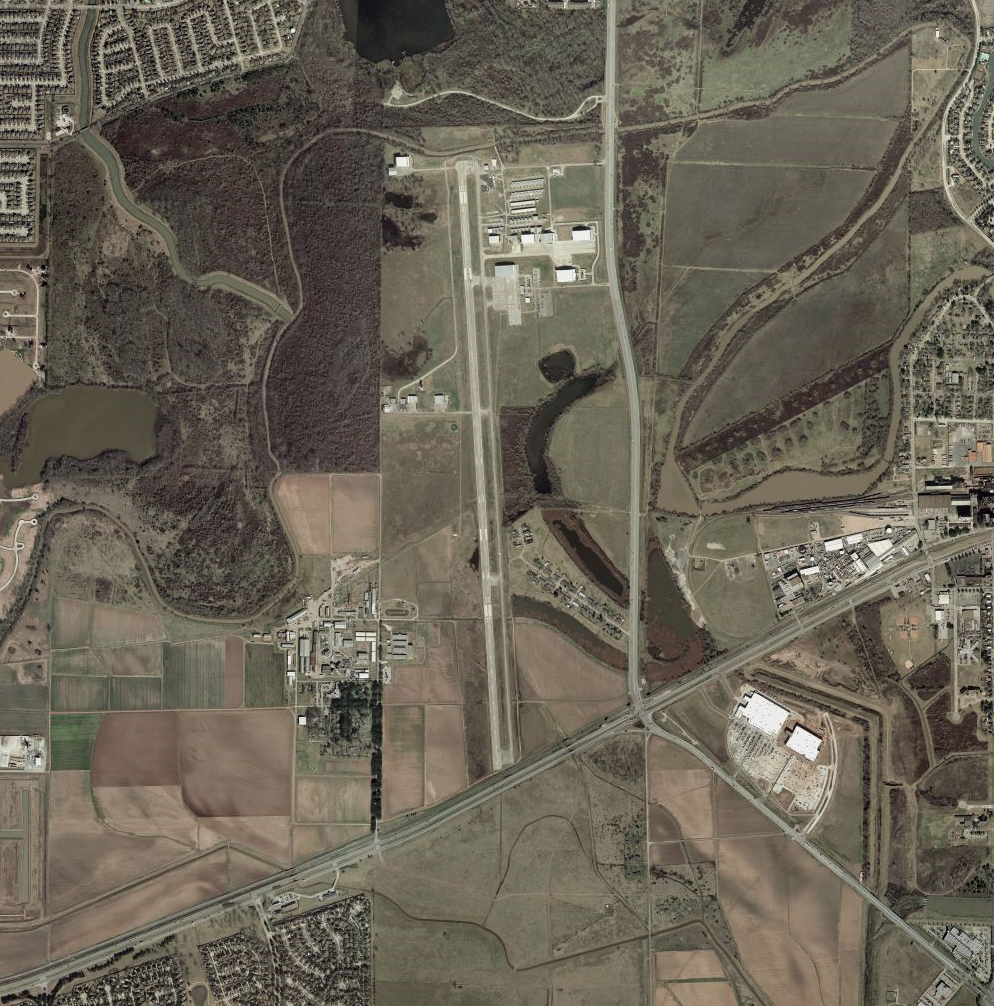
Aerial photograph of the airport and the Central Unit prison property, which is on both sides of the runway, on January 27, 2002 - U.S. Geological Survey

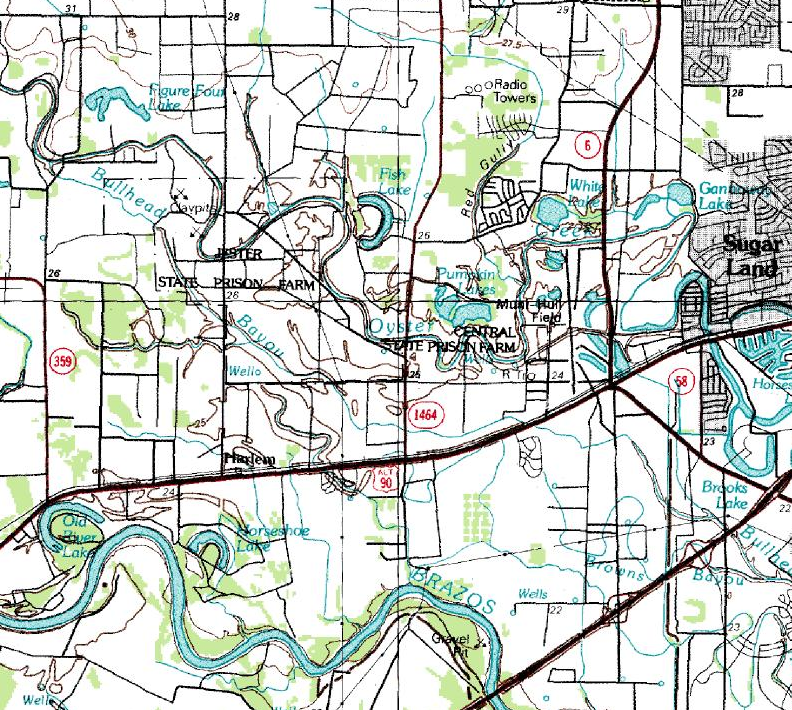
Topographical map of the airport, with the Central Prison Farm. To the west is the Jester Prison Farm (Jester I, Jester II (Carol Vance), Jester III, and Jester IV), July 1, 1990, U.S. Geological Survey

== Accidents & incidents ==
- On May 27, 2023, a Piaggio P.18 Avanti II was damaged during takeoff from the Sugar Land Regional Airport. The pilot retracted the landing gear shortly after rotation, and the plane subsequently settled back to the runway. The flaps were also selected for the fully retracted position. The probable cause of the accident was found to be the pilot’s failure to complete required preflight checklist items and properly configure the flaps for takeoff.

== See also ==
- List of airports in Texas
