= Central Unit =

Former prison in Sugar Land, Texas, US

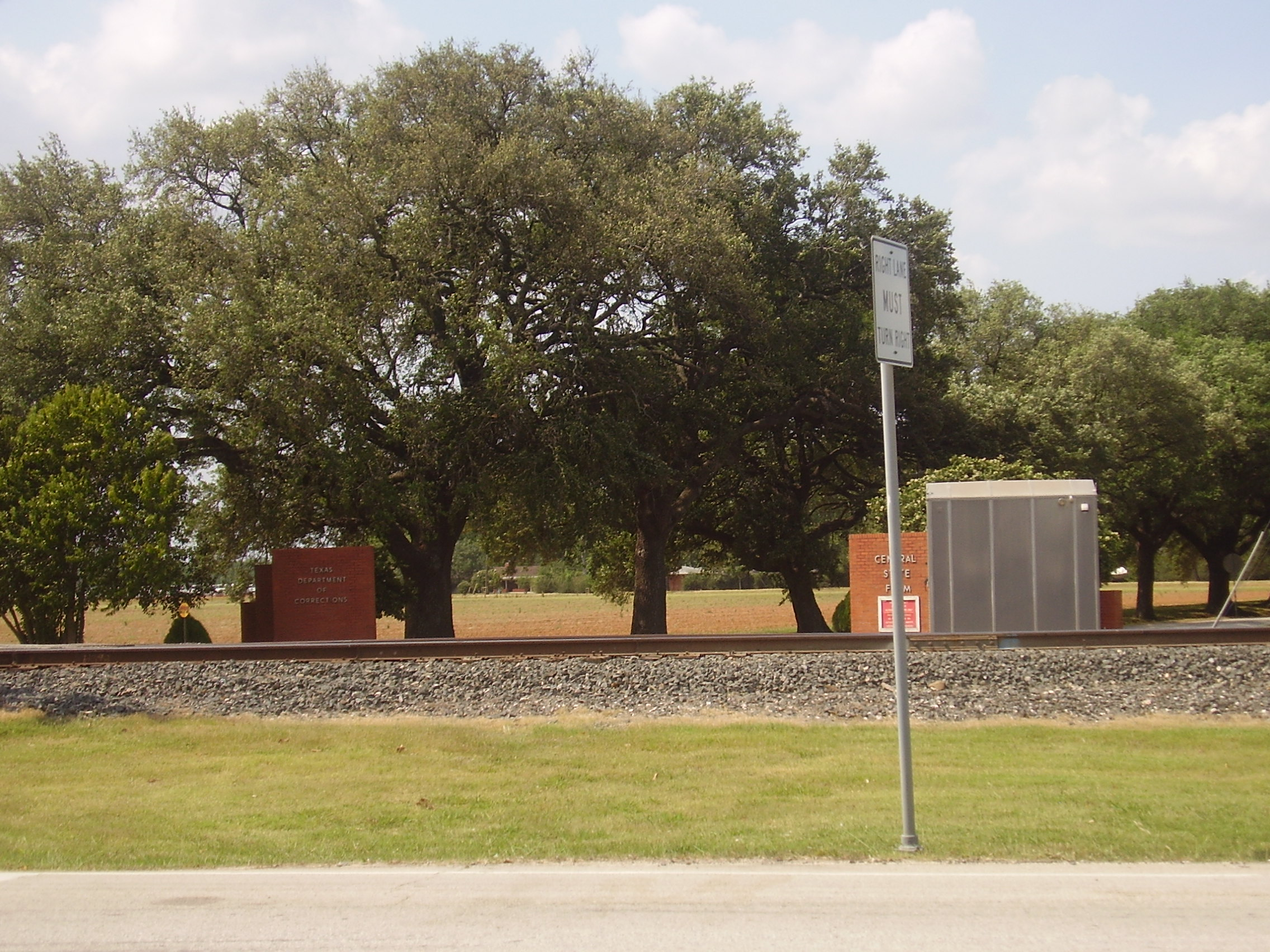
Main entrance of the Central Unit

The Central Unit (C, previously the Imperial State Prison Farm and the Central State Prison Farm) was a Texas Department of Criminal Justice (TDCJ) men's prison in Sugar Land, Texas. The approximately 325.8-acre (131.8 ha) facility is 2 miles (3.2 km) from the central part of the city of Sugar Land on U.S. Highway 90A.

The unit first opened in April 1909. The unit had 950 beds for men but related facilities increased capacity at the site.

Sugar Land Regional Airport was developed adjacent to this unit, with the runway between two parts of the prison property. The Central Unit was the only state prison within the city limits of Sugar Land which, since 1960, has been highly developed as a suburban, upscale residential and business city.

In August 2011, the TDCJ announced that the Central Unit would be the first prison in Texas to close without being replaced. The state wanted to save money at a time of budget shortfalls.

Since then, most of the former prison plantation land has been redeveloped by Newland Communities as a master-planned community known as Telfair. Newland Communities had bought the land in 2002 from the State of Texas, long planning such development. Two Camp, a former prison building, has been renovated as the Houston Museum of Natural Science Sugar Land. Other parts of the site are zoned for light industrial use to support the airport.

== History ==
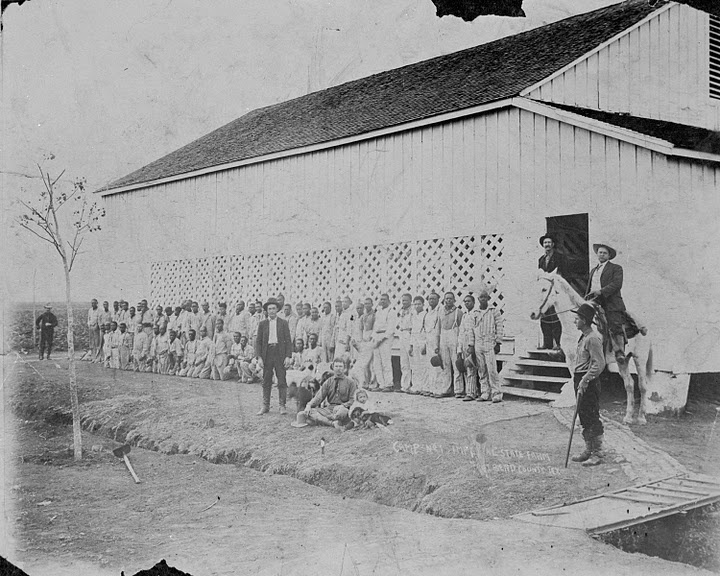
Captain Veale, 1908

In 1878 the state began to lease convicts as laborers to private companies operating on the Imperial Sugar property. This practice was widespread in Texas and across the South after Reconstruction, when few states had prisons. Many states generated substantial revenues from the fees for convict leasing. They passed what were known as Black Codes, criminalizing behavior they believed associated with freedmen and charging them fees for convictions, for instance, for so-called vagrancy. Because in a cash-poor economy, men often couldn't pay the fee, they were required to work off the costs as convict laborers. The states made so much money that they had incentives to convict poor men for minor offenses. Convict leasing was little regulated; the state did not protect the convicts or oversee their treatment. This system was thoroughly explored and documented in Douglas A. Blackmon's Slavery by Another Name: The Re-Enslavement of Black Americans from the Civil War to World War II (2008).

The State of Texas bought the 5,200-acre (2,100 ha) area in 1908. The Imperial State Prison Farm, one of the first penal institutions owned by the State of Texas, opened in 1909 in the Imperial Sugar plantation. Originally it had 3,700 acres (1,500 ha) and was the hub of the Texas state correctional agriculture production.

In 1930 the facility was renamed as the Central State Prison Farm. The name "Central" originates from the prison's status for many years as the central farming and distribution point of agricultural goods from correctional facilities. Construction of a new unit of the Central Farm, funded by the 41st Texas Legislature, began in late 1930. The $350,000 unit was completed in late 1932. It consisted of 12 acres (4.9 ha) of land, including a main building with administration and inmate housing, and an industrial facilities building with a canner, meatpacking plant, and powerhouse.

The state intended for Central to become the central intake and rehabilitation prison in the prison system. In the mid-1930s Central had nearly 700 prisoners. In 1935 Central housed both White and African American prisoners, who were segregated. In the 1950s the prison had over 1,000 inmates.

In 1963, before racial desegregation occurred, the facility housed first offenders and white male prisoners under 25 years of age. Central Unit II housed male African-American second offenders under the age of 25.

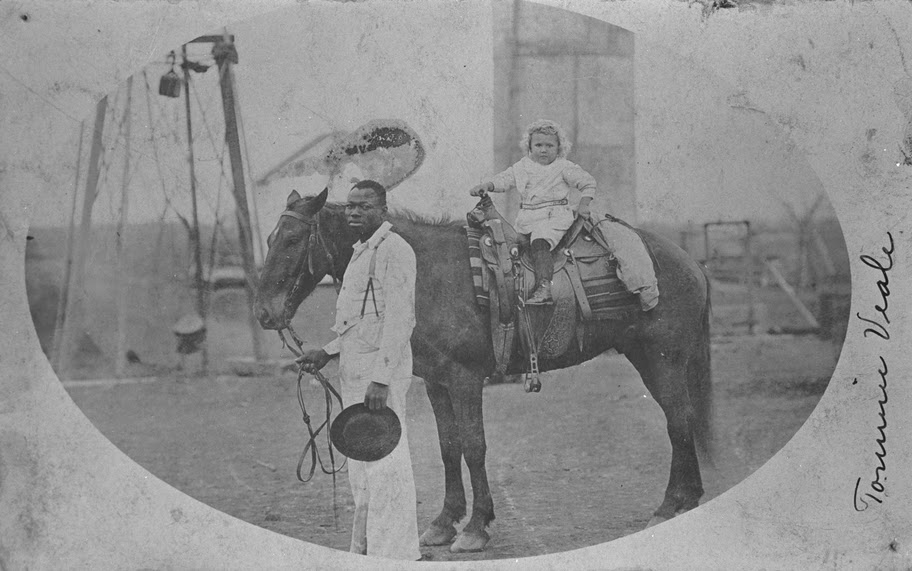
A trustee at the Imperial State Farm with the daughter of Captain Veale, 1907-1909

In 1991 3,700 acres (1,500 ha) of land was transferred to the Texas Department of Transportation for the construction of Texas State Highway 99 (Grand Parkway) and other highways; much of that land included territory that was originally a part of the Central Unit. By 2007 the state had sold land, and surrounding development over the years reduced the prison to 336 acres (136 ha).

In 2000 the prison operated the "Texas Fresh Approach" program, a collaborative developed by the TDCJ, Miller Brewing Co., and the Texas Association of Second Harvest Food Banks. As part of the program, prisoners grew vegetables, which were sent to food banks throughout Texas. The TDCJ officials said that the work supported helping others. Miller paid for the transportation of vegetables in the "Fighting Hunger in Texas" program.

In March 2007 39-year-old David Shane Roberts escaped from the Central Unit.

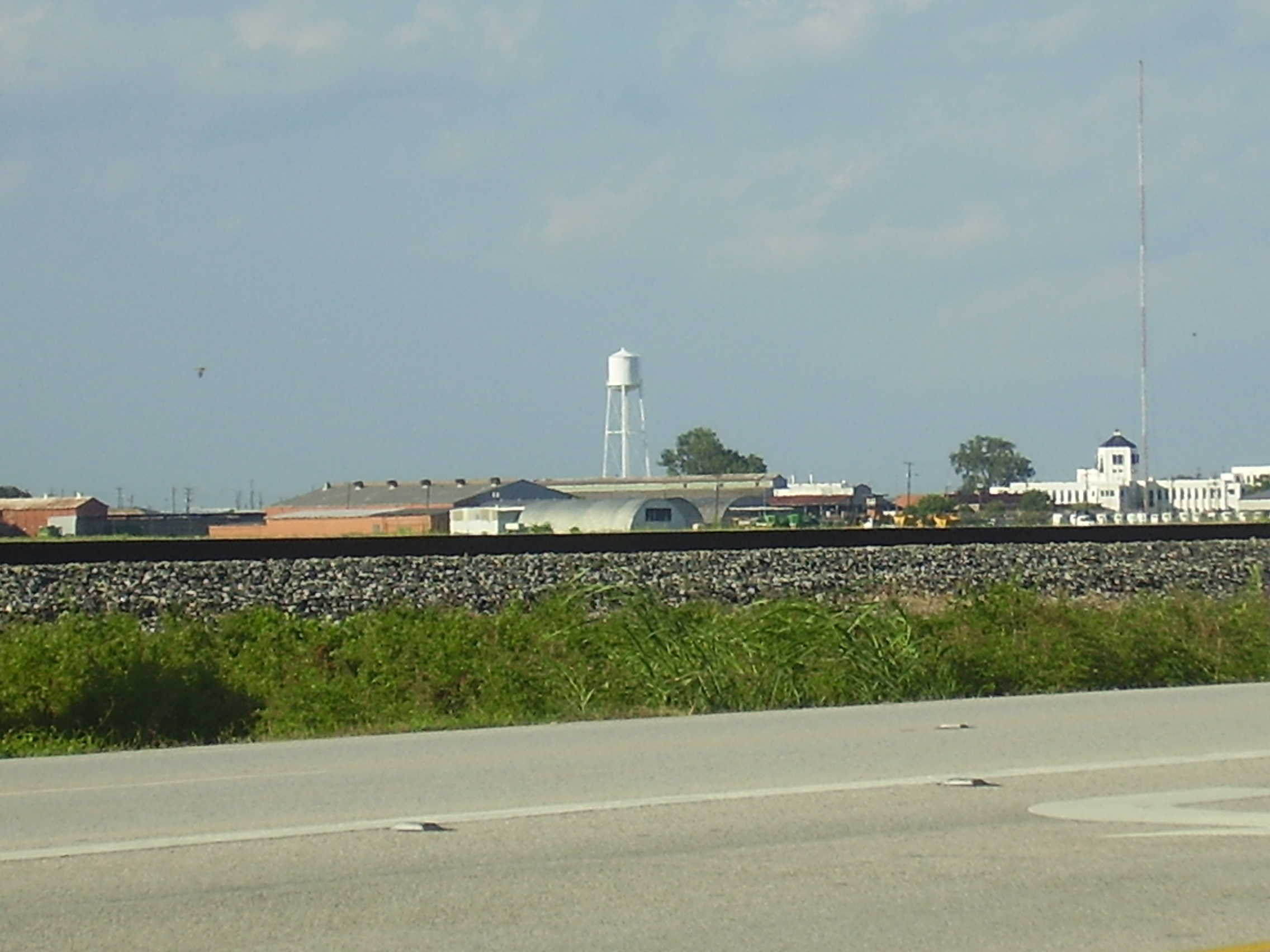
View of the Central Unit from U.S. Highway 90A

=== Closure ===
By 2007 residential development began to surround the prison. In addition, the Central Unit is in land zoned by the county for expansion of the Sugar Land Regional Airport. The airport was considering expansion of its facilities, and was seeking a $30 million federal grant to study those possibilities.

The City of Sugar Land made moving the facility one of its main priorities for the 2007 state legislative session. John Whitmire, a member of the Texas State Senate, advocated moving the facility to an area in Brazoria County, Texas near the community of Rosharon. The area has several existing TDCJ facilities. Whitmire said that a prison in that location would be less expensive to operate and would allow the state to alleviate a shortage of correction personnel by consolidating staff members. In 2007 TDCJ officials said that discussions to move the Central Unit from Sugar Land to Brazoria County were preliminary. During the same year, Whitmire promoted a bill calling for a study for the feasibility of selling the land of the Central Unit. The bill awaited the signature of Governor of Texas Rick Perry. As of that year the Texas General Land Office estimated the value of the land to $10.1 million.

Hal Croft, the acting deputy director of asset management of the land office, said in a press release "That property is like the center of a doughnut — prime property now because it has been surrounded by development." If the prison is sold, the resulting funds would be used to fund public schools; they cannot be used to build another prison facility.

By 2008 the city and the state were conducting a joint study researching whether the TDCJ should close the Central Unit and sell the land. Mayor of Sugar Land Dave Wallace said "Let's just say that a prison is not the highest and best use for that land right now." During that year the TDCJ granted the prison's access easements to the City of Sugar Land. By 2009 the City of Sugar Land had already zoned the land that the prison occupied to a light industrial commercial park zone.

Allen Bogard, the City Manager of Sugar Land, said that he believed that the Central Unit property "has a much higher purpose and value to the state of Texas to be utilized for economic development purposes." Some Sugar Land residents supported the idea of the prison leaving. Some residents feared that sexually oriented businesses, such as strip clubs, could open in a light industrial commercial park zone once the prison was closed. By 2009 the airport received a $2 million grant for airport expansion, and the grant could be used to buy the prison property. In 2009 the State of Texas authorized the purchase of the Smithville portion by the City of Sugar Land. If the prison closes, the TDCJ would lose the Central Unit's 1,060 prisoner beds.

By 2010, due to the expansion of Greater Houston, housing developments such as Chelsea Harbor were constructed within .5 miles (0.80 km) of the prison grounds. In February 2011 the prison had 330 acres (130 ha) of land remaining.

In mid-2011 the State of Texas had a severe budget shortfall. State legislators determined they needed to close the Central Unit to save money. On May 30, 2011, the regular session of the 82nd Texas Legislature concluded. The legislature voted to close the Central Unit by removing funding on September 1 of that year. Mike Ward of the Austin American-Statesman said that, one week prior to the decision, "it appeared" that the Central Unit would remain open because legislators questioned whether removing capacity for 1,500 prisoners was a good decision.

In August 2011, Texas Department of Criminal Justice announced that the prison will be closing. Spokesperson Michelle Lyons said it will become the first prison in Texas history to close and not be replaced. 71 prison guards will go to other prisons to work. On August 2, 2011, 200 prison guards and 80 prisoners remained to move the trucking hub and soap factory out of Central. The Roach Unit was scheduled to take the former Central soap factory and the Ramsey Unit was scheduled to take the trucking hub. By the end of August, the prison was scheduled to be completely vacant.

The state planned to spread the prisoners throughout the state, and not place too many Central prisoners at any remaining unit. Many prisoners went to the Jester State Prison Farm family of units, near Sugar Land, and the Darrington Unit. The legislature estimated that the closure would mean annual savings of $1.25 million. After the closure, the Texas General Land Office took possession of the property. Central Unit had operated for 112 years.

Mike Ward of the Austin American-Statesman stated that the three factors that led to the closure of the Central Unit were the expansion of suburban development, the stabilization of the state's adult prison population, and pressure to take budget cuts. Herman Weston was the unit's final warden.

=== Post-closure ===
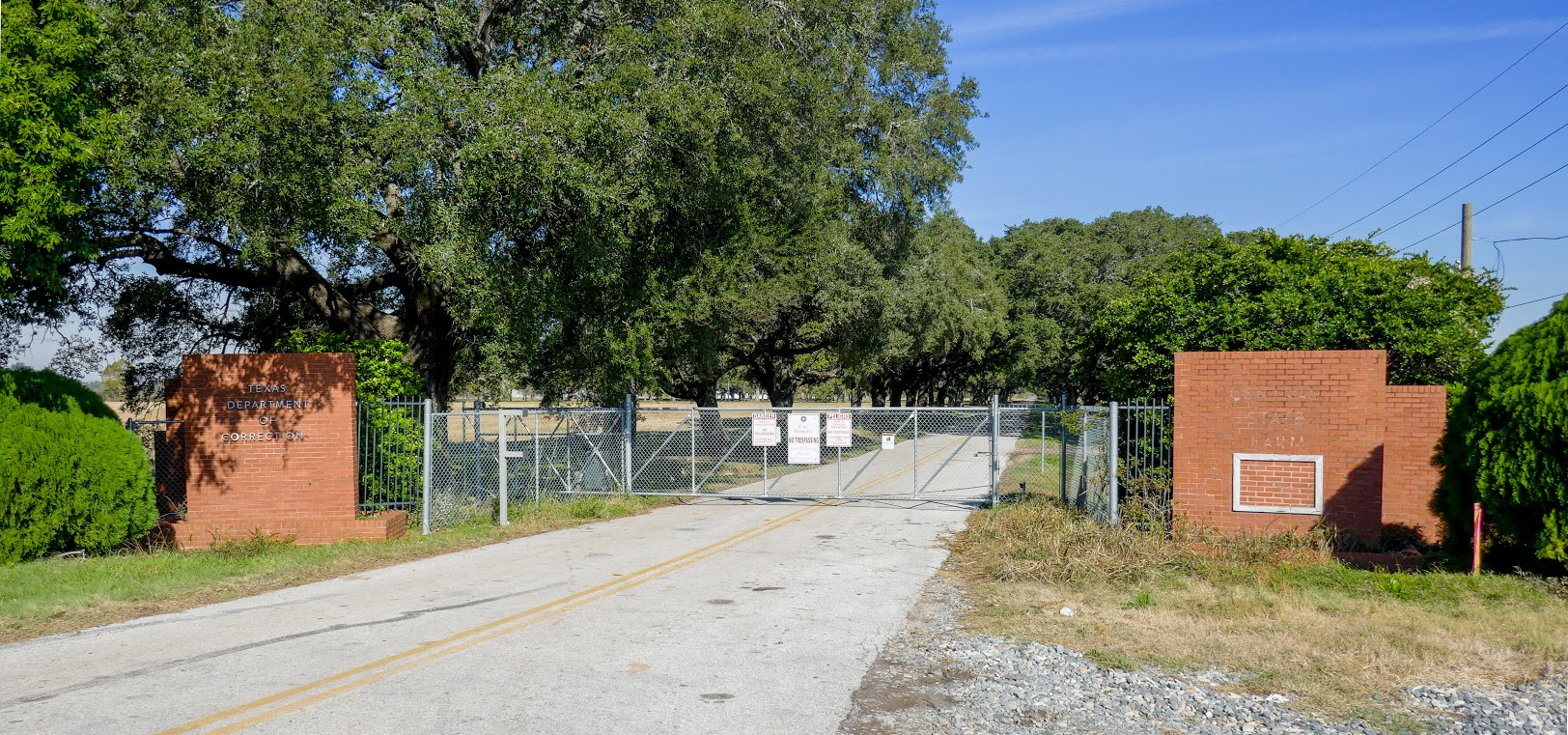
The entrance post-closure

As of 2014 the City of Sugar Land plans to convert much of the property into an industrial park. The city government of Sugar Land approved paying Hines Interests Limited Partnership $207,800 as part of a contract in order to do a feasibility study on the new usage of the land in mid-November 2014.

== Operations and composition ==
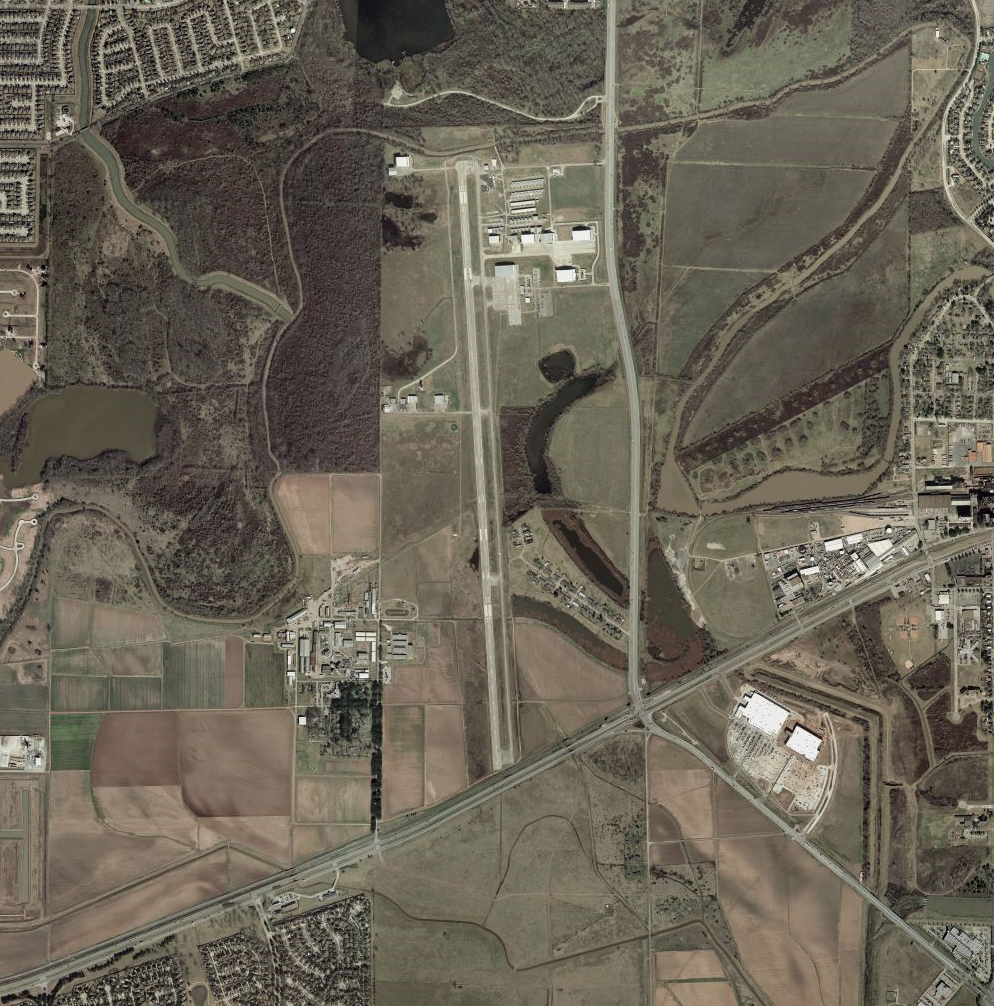
Aerial photograph of the Central Unit and Sugar Land Regional Airport on January 27, 2002 - U.S. Geological Survey

The unit, with 336 acres (136 ha) of land, was located .75 miles (1.21 km) from the intersection of Texas State Highway 6 and U.S. Highway 90A.

The Central Unit property includes the main prison unit and the Smithville Prison Property (CPU). The prison property is adjacent to the Sugar Land Regional Airport. Prisoners grow crops on land next to the airport's runway. Many of the remaining buildings were constructed in an Art Deco architecture style. Several neighborhoods had been built nearby.

The unit was in proximity to Harris County and Hospital Galveston; as of 2009 Harris County sentenced more criminals into TDCJ than did any other county in Texas. The TDCJ assigned some prisoners to the Central Unit so that the prisoners resided closer to their former homes and could keep in touch with families. The proximity to Hospital Galveston also allowed for Central Unit prisoners to have convenient access to health care services.

As of 2004 Central served as a minimum security unit for about 1,000 prisoners. Most of its prisoners were first-time offenders. The prisoners were housed in the Main Building, twelve prefabricated dormitories separate from the main building but inside the compound, and in a trusty camp outside the prison compound. Prisoners grew crops several dozen yards from one of the runways at Sugar Land Regional Airport.

The compound included 113 housing units for staff members and their families; the units include 48 duplexes, 42 officer's quarters, 9 mobile home spaces, and 14 single family units. If Central closes, state employee housing would likely not be available for many TDCJ employees who transfer to other units.

Central Unit included a detergent and soap factory, a mechanic shop, a freight transportation terminal, and farming operations. Sugar Land Distribution Center (SLDC), a men's correctional facility supply warehouse, was inside the unit.

=== Main prison ===
In February 2011, the main prison property was located on 245 acres (99 ha) of land. 80% of the land was raw land.

The Central Barber Shop, the prison barber shop, was located in the tower structure. The Austin American-Statesman said that a cohort of the criminal duo Bonnie and Clyde was said to have lived in a closet within the tower structure.

=== Smithville Prison property ===
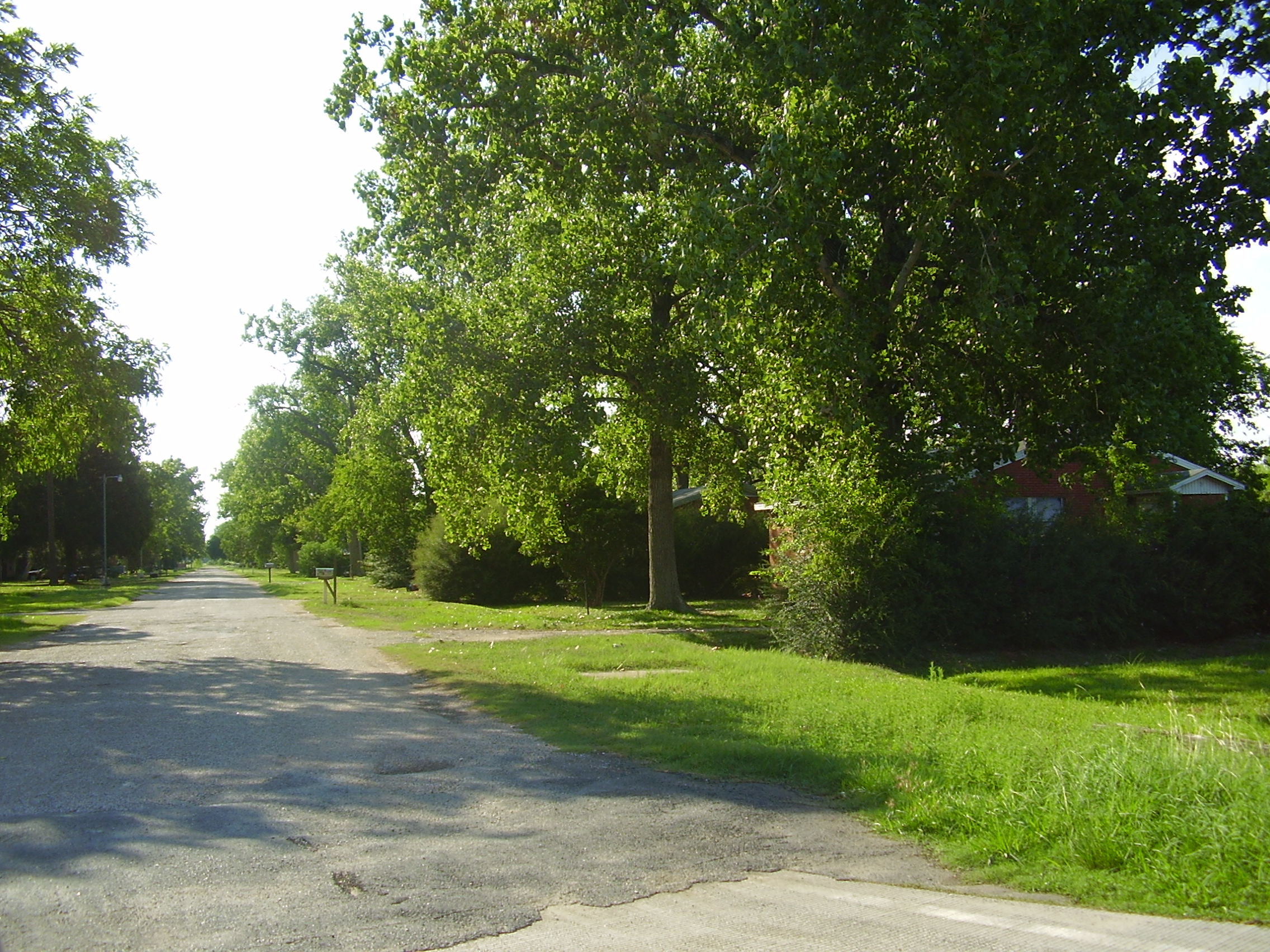
Smithville

The Smithville Prison Property (29°37′03″N 95°39′09″W), near the northwest corner of Texas State Highway 6 and U.S. Highway 90A and east of the runway of Sugar Land Regional Airport, had employee housing and farmland. In 2010 it had 96 acres (39 ha) of land. In February 2011 it had 85 acres (34 ha) of land. Smithville was adjacent to the airport's southeast corner. The road in Smithville was lined with trees. The prison warden and other top officials lived there.

The State of Texas agreed to allow the TDCJ to sell this property to Sugar Land in 2009. The City said that the current employee housing is "unusable". It plans to demolish the housing to make way for executive hangar sites. 16 acres (6.5 ha) of the land will be used for the relocation of a parallel airport taxiway, and the remaining land will contain related airport development. The City of Sugar Land stated that the acquisition of Smithville was a "key project for the Airport in fiscal year 2010."

=== History of prison ===
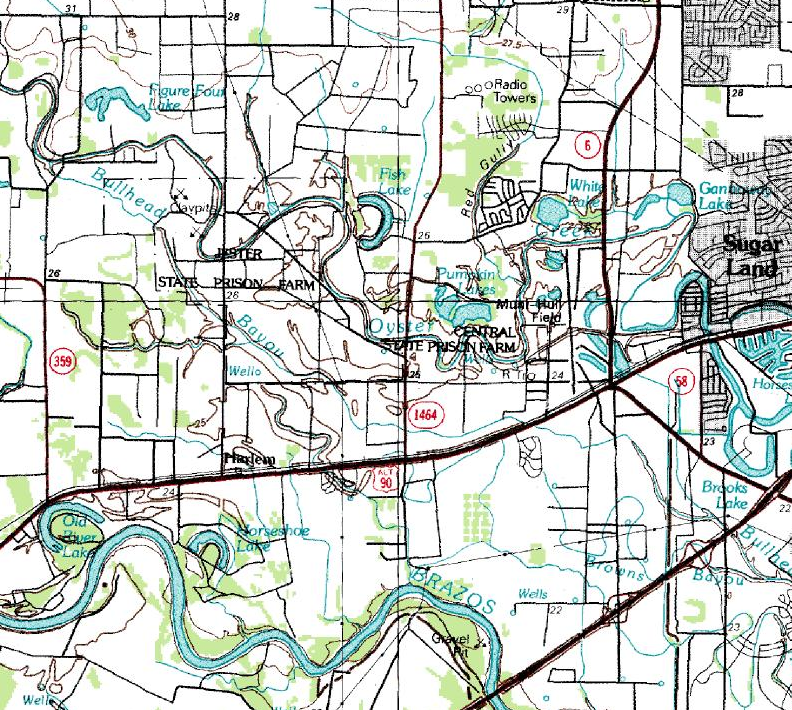
Topographical map of the Central Prison Farm, the Jester Prison Farm (Jester I, Jester II (Carol Vance), Jester III, and Jester IV) and Sugar Land Regional Airport, July 1, 1990, U.S. Geological Survey

When the State of Texas acquired the land in 1908, the prison property had 5,435 acres (2,199 ha) of land. Since then the state has sold parcels of the Central Unit, reducing its size, and various local and state bodies have also claimed land, much of it to support transportation improvements. From 1921 to 1984, the state sold a total of 945 acres (382 ha) to private individuals and industries.

A 1935 resurvey by the Texas State Reclamation Department caused the facility to lose 148 acres (60 ha). In 1964 130 acres (53 ha) were transferred to the Texas State Highway Department. In 1985 the Texas State Highway and Public Transportation Commission took ownership of 109 acres (44 ha). In 1986 the Fort Bend Independent School District took control of 56 acres (23 ha). In 1991 the Texas State Department of Highways and Public Transportation took 3,697 acres (1,496 ha). In 2001 14 acres (5.7 ha) were transferred to the Permanent School Fund.

In 1932 a concrete housing unit for 600 prisoners opened, replacing wooden barracks that were situated at three work camps. Prominent architects had designed the concrete building. It includes a cupola that prison guards once used as a lookout.

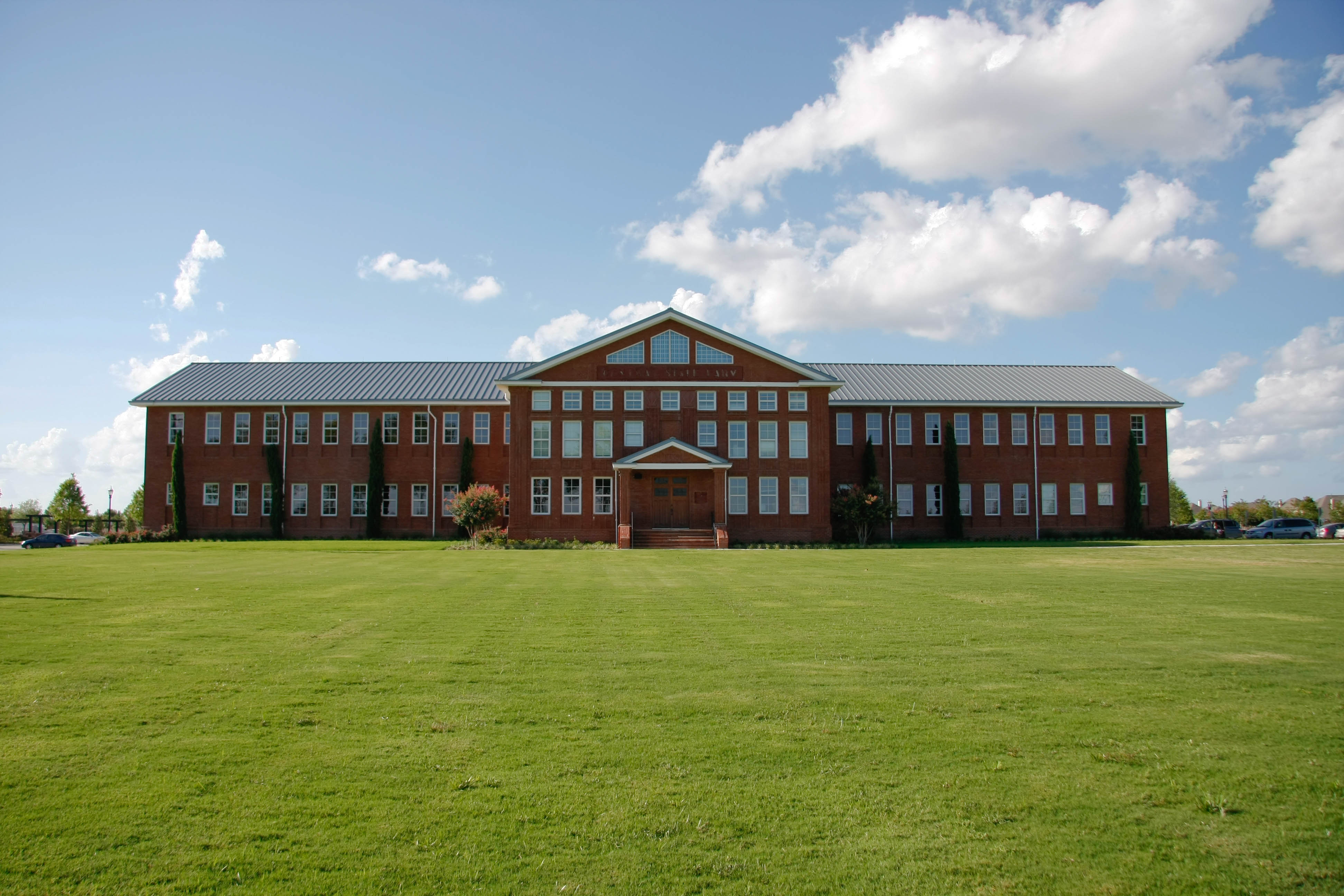
Two Camp, a former brick building of the Central Unit, now the Houston Museum of Natural Science Sugar Land

A Greek Revival brick building of the Central Unit located east of the Brazos River, named Two Camp, opened in 1939. At one time it housed 400 young African-American prisoners. The facility closed in 1969.

Don Hudson, a former employee of the Texas Prison System, stated that there were two possible reasons why Two Camp closed. Newspaper articles of the era said that it was antiquated, and Hudson said that prison officials may have intended to sell the land occupied by Two Camp to private developers.

The building remained unoccupied for several decades. In 2002 the State of Texas sold the parcel with the former dormitory to Newland Communities. Newland decided to restore the building, which had some broken windows and some loose exterior bricks. The company arranged to place a new metal roof on the building. City officials and local historians positively reacted to the restoration decision from Newland.

Around 2005 Newland began development of the Telfair subdivision, located on former prison property, around the former Two Camp Building.

In 2009 the 43,000 square feet (4,000 m^{2}) Two Camp Building and its nearby land were adapted and opened as the Houston Museum of Natural Science, Sugar Land. The subdivision donated the building and land to the City of Sugar Land, and the city leases the building to the museum. The museum spent $3 million to help renovate the building.

=== School zoning ===
Residents of the staff housing were zoned to the Fort Bend Independent School District. Residents of the main Central Unit property were zoned to Cornerstone Elementary School, Sartartia Middle School, and Austin High School. Residents of the Smithville property were zoned to Lakeview Elementary School, Sugar Land Middle School, and Kempner High School.

In 2006 Smithville was rezoned from Kempner to Austin, with grades 9-10 immediately zoned to Austin, and grades 11-12 zoned to Kempner, with a phasing in by grade. Smithville had since been rezoned back to Kempner.

== Cemetery ==
The Imperial State Farm Cemetery, a small prison cemetery located on the south side of U.S. Highway 90A in the northwest part of Telfair, has graves of deceased prisoners. The cemetery, also known as the Old Imperial Farm Cemetery, has at least 33 graves, with the earliest three dated from 1912. Most graves are those of African-American inmates. The earliest are of men arrested on trumped-up charges under the discriminatory Black Codes, in order to supply labor for the state's convict lease system. This practice was widespread in the South before most states built prisons; some made a large portion of their budgets from convict leasing, which has been called "slavery by another name." The state conducted little regulation of treatment of prisoners, many of whom were abused, and poorly fed and housed by their employers. At least one grave notes that the inmate drowned while attempting to escape. Three graves are post dated to the 1930s.

The cemetery was once open to the public. It is now surrounded by two fences with the inner one locked to protect the site. It was declared an Historic Texas Cemetery in 2007. The city of Sugar Land announced in 2012 plans to build a park on the surrounding undeveloped land, and park plans were designed the same year. The park would include the cemetery with a walkway encircling it. However, a bond proposal to fund the park failed to gain passage in November 2013.

Reginald Moore, designated as caretaker of the cemetery by the Texas Historical Commission, who is a former Texas Department of Corrections employee, has criticized the City of Sugar Land and state of Texas for attempting to erase the history of the Black Codes and convict leasing by plans for the cemetery. Moore, the founder of the Texas Slave Descendant Society, and others such as anthropologist Fred McGhee, have called for commemoration of the graveyard and its occupants.

Sugar Land officials denied the claims of covering up the racial history of the city. It said that a historical marker to be erected at the site of the cemetery would memorialize injustices against African Americans in the Texas prison system during the late 1800s and early 1900s. Activists of the Texas Slave Descendant Society said that a museum would be more appropriate as commemoration. They complained that federal historical laws had been circumvented by the City in accepting the transfer of this property and making plans without consulting with appropriate parties on effects on the historical property. As a response, a United States federal agency, the Advisory Council on Historic Preservation, began an investigation into the issue in early 2014.

In March 2018 an employee doing excavation for the Fort Bend Independent School District near the former prison site, discovered a human bone that was not recent. The school district notified the Texas Historical Commission that there appeared to be a newly discovered burial ground. A grave with 95 bodies was found.

== Notable inmates ==
- Huddie Ledbetter (Lead Belly)

== Representation in other media ==
- An episode of Ghost Adventures was about the Central Unit; it first aired on Friday, September 14, 2012.
- "Ain't No More Cane on the Brazos" was first recorded here, performed by prisoners
