= Wayne Scott Unit =

Coordinates: 29°37′22″N 95°42′11″W

Wayne Scott Unit (formerly the Jester IV Unit)
- Texas Department of Criminal Justice

Geography
- Location: Fort Bend County, Texas, United States

Organization
- Type: Psychiatric

History
- Founded: 1993

Links
- Website: https://www.tdcj.texas.gov/unit_directory/j4.html

The Wayne Scott Unit (J4), formerly known as the Beauford H. Jester IV Unit, is a psychiatric facility of the Texas Department of Criminal Justice located in unincorporated Fort Bend County, Texas, United States, 4 miles (6.4 km) east of Richmond. It is a part of the Jester State Prison Farm property and it is located on U.S. Highway 90A.

The unit was established in November 1993. The facility features wide hallways, skylights, and floor-to-ceiling windows. The cement walls have murals made by prisoners that depict wildlife. Jester IV is located in the middle of a cornfield. After the closure of the nearby Central Unit in 2011, John Whitmire, the chairperson of the criminal justice committee of the Texas Senate, said that the decision to open Jester IV was a decision that "I think we'll regret." In 2011 a middle school, James Bowie Middle School, and a strip commercial center opened across the street from Jester IV and Jester III Unit.

As of March 2013 Jester IV housed 550 prisoners. They are among the most mentally ill and violent prisoners in the TDCJ. While male death row prisoners are normally housed in the Polunsky Unit near Livingston, Texas, eight are instead housed in Jester IV as of March 2013. Marc Bookman of Mother Jones said in 2013 that "by all accounts Jester IV is a quieter place" compared to Polunsky.

The prison was renamed to Wayne Scott Unit in 2021. The name "Wayne Scott Unit" was formerly held by a Brazoria County prison originally known as the Retrieve Unit; the main facility of that prison closed in 2020.

== Treatment program ==
As of March 2013 a prisoner typically comes from his regularly assigned unit to Jester IV for several days of psychiatric treatment. After the prisoner is stabilized, the prisoner is sent back to his regular unit. There are prisoners that have stayed longer.

== Notable inmates ==
- Andre Thomas (Death row) - Moved from the Polunsky Unit due to mental health issues.
- Eddie Ray Routh - serving life without parole. Moved on to Ramsey I Unit.
- Trey Eric Sesler - arrived in 2019, serving life without parole.
