= Jester I Unit =

Coordinates: 29°38′12″N 95°42′48″W

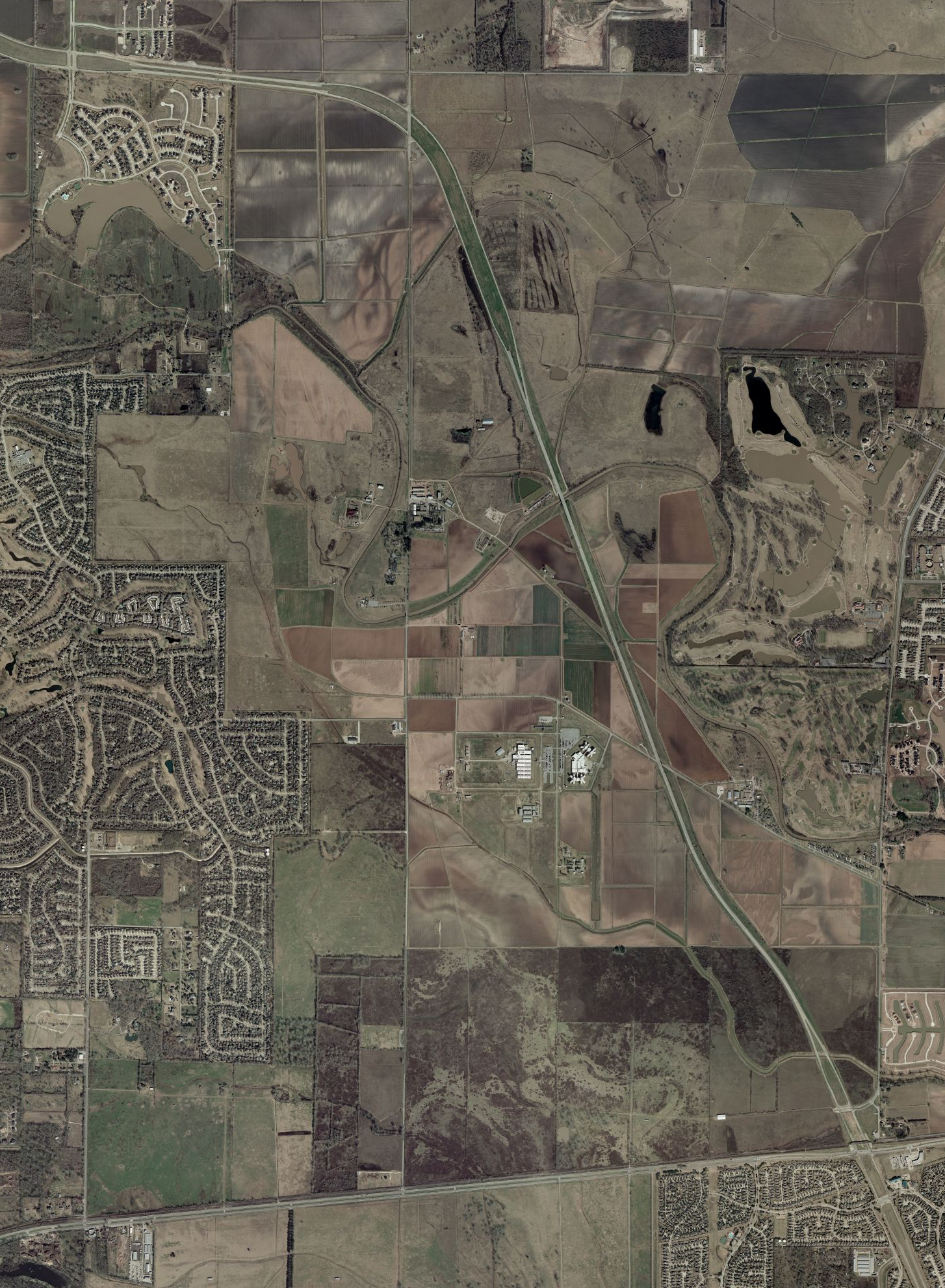
Aerial view of the Jester State Prison Farm, January 27, 2002, U.S. Geographic Survey

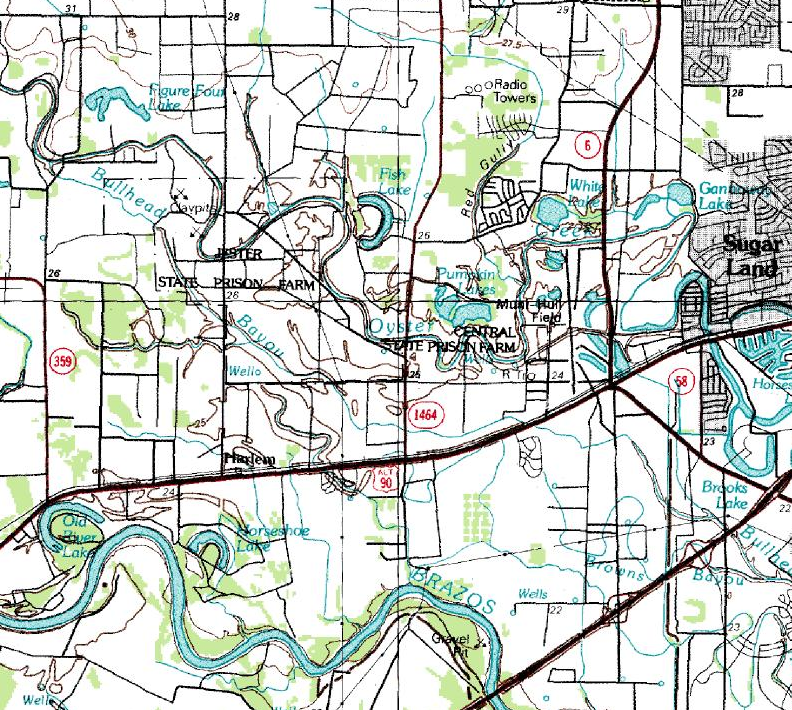
Topographical map of the Jester Prison Farm, the Central Prison Farm, and Sugar Land Regional Airport, July 1, 1990, U.S. Geological Survey

The Beauford H. Jester I Unit was a Texas Department of Criminal Justice substance abuse felony punishment facility (SAFPF) located in unincorporated Fort Bend County, Texas, United States. The unit was situated at Harlem Road and Ken Drive, on about 940 acres (380 ha) of land, co-located with Carol Vance Unit, Jester III Unit, and Jester IV Unit which lie a little to its southeast. It was situated on the Jester State Prison Farm property.

== History ==
The unit opened in 1885, and its first brick building was in 1932.

The unit was originally known as the Harlem I Unit. Under the administration of George Beto, the unit was converted into a pre-release facility. The unit was renamed after Governor of Texas Beauford H. Jester.

In 1935, Jester held white prisoners. In 1963, before racial desegregation occurred, the facility housed Hispanic and Latino American first-time offenders and prisoners considered by the administration to have good rehabilitative prospects.

Effective 2020, the Jester I and Garza East Unit is slated for closure with a planned transfer of the Jester I inmates to the Stringfellow Unit.
