= Jester III Unit =

Prison farm in Fort Bend County, Texas, United States

Beauford H. Jester III Unit
- Interactive map of Beauford H. Jester III Unit
- Location: 3 Jester Road Richmond, Texas 77406; 29.6227167°N 095.7034667°W
- Status: Operational
- Security class: G1-G3, Outside Trusty
- Capacity: Unit: 810; Trusty Camp: 321
- Opened: July 1982
- Managed by: TDCJ Correctional Institutions Division
- Warden: Amber Ochoa
- Website: www.tdcj.texas.gov/unit_directory/j3.html

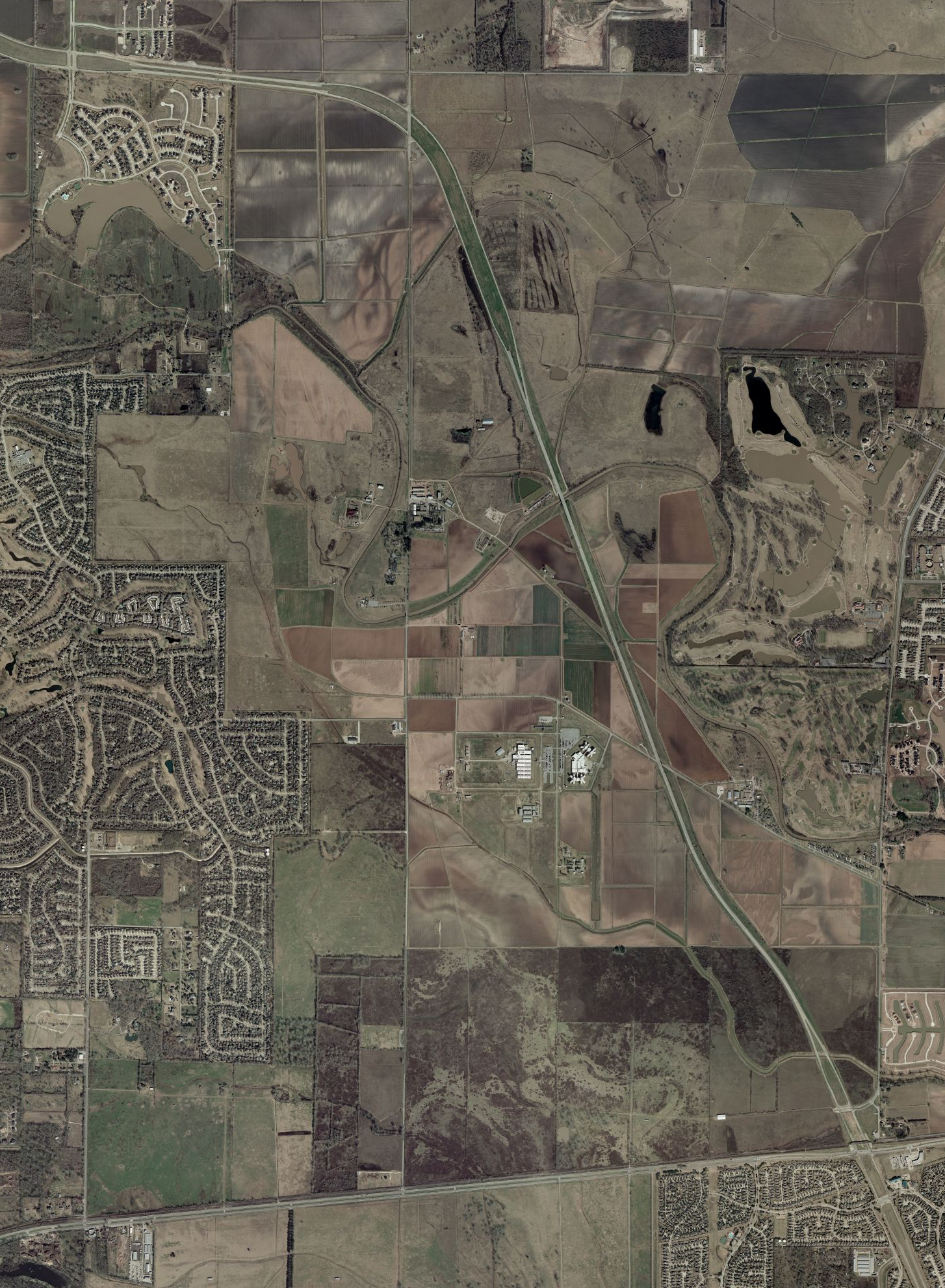
Aerial view of the Jester State Prison Farm, January 27, 2002, U.S. Geographic Survey

The Beauford H. Jester III Unit (J3) is a Texas Department of Criminal Justice (TDCJ) prison farm located in unincorporated Fort Bend County, Texas, United States. The unit is along U.S. Highway 90A, 4 miles (6.4 km) east of central Richmond. The unit, which opened in July 1982 with about 940 acres (380 ha) of land, is co-located with Jester I Unit, Carol Vance Unit, and Jester IV Unit. Together with its trusty camp, it houses 1,131 inmates.

The unit was named after Governor of Texas Beauford H. Jester, the namesake for the entire prison farm. Jester III opened in 1982. The land that Jester III sits on was purchased in 1885 by the state.

In 2011 the prison's garment plant closed, and its operations were consolidated with the garment plant at the Wainwright Unit, formerly known as the Eastham Unit.

In 2011 a middle school, James Bowie Middle School, and a strip commercial center opened across the street from Jester III and Jester IV Unit.

== Gallery ==
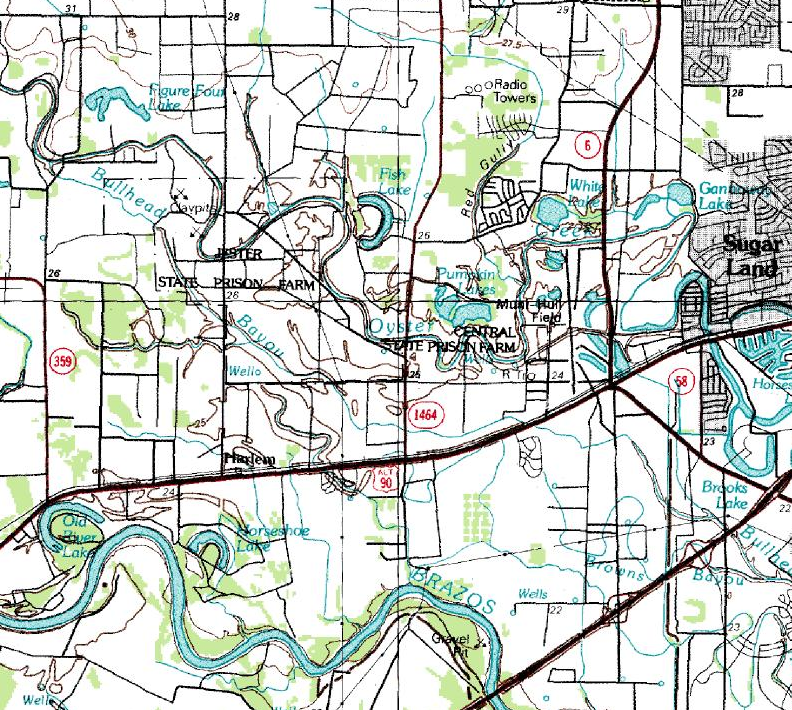
Topographical map of the Jester Prison Farm, to the west of the Central Prison Farm and Sugar Land Regional Airport, July 1, 1990, U.S. Geological Survey
