= Sugar Land, Texas =

City in the United States

- City
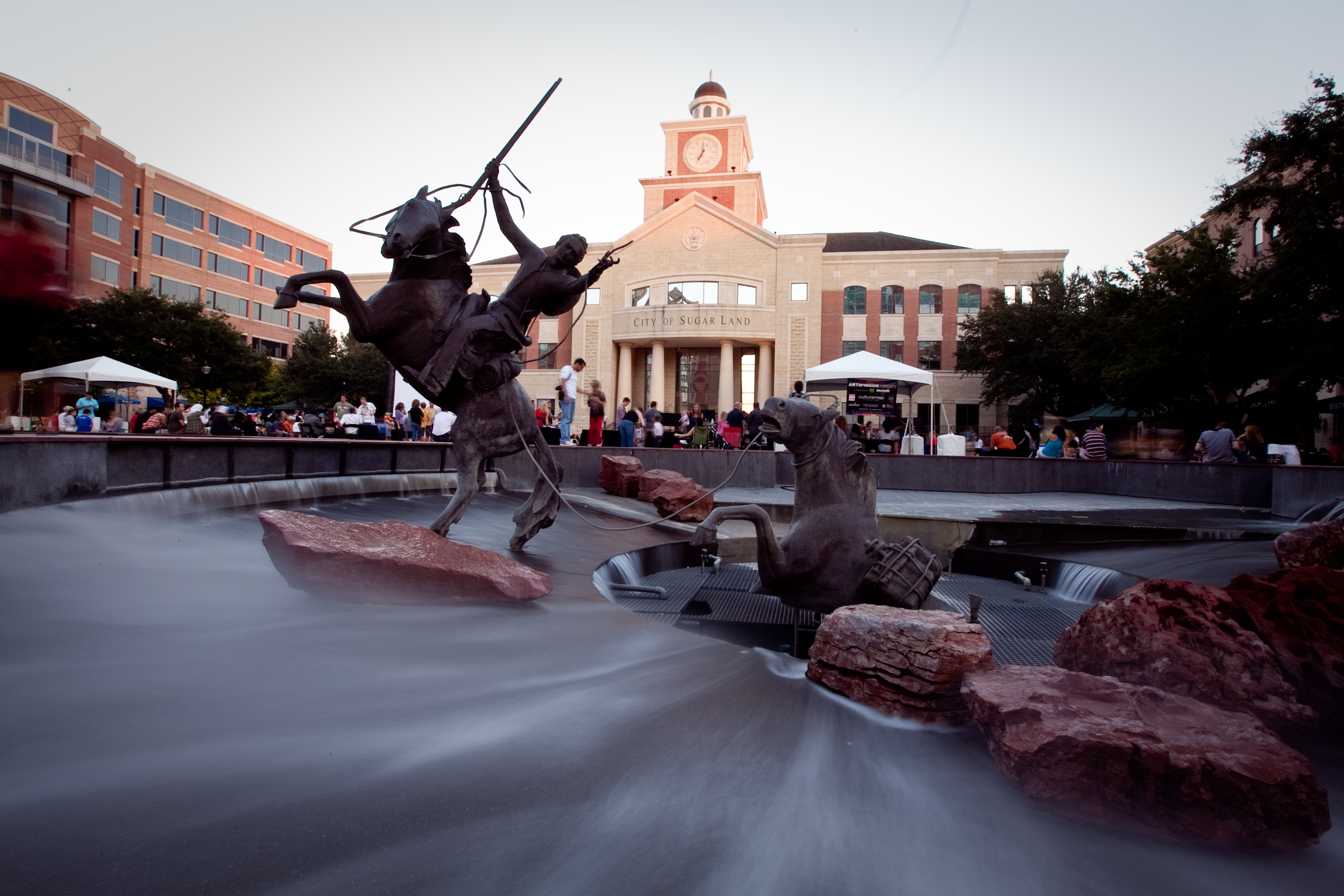
- Sugar Land Town Square, First Colony in 2010

- Seal

- Location in Fort Bend County, Texas

- Location in Texas Location in the United States
- Coordinates: 29°35′58″N 95°36′51″W
- Country: United States
- State: Texas
- County: Fort Bend

Government
  - Type: Council-Manager
  - City Council: Mayor Carol McCutcheon; Jim Vonderhaar; Rob Boettcher; Suzanne Whatley; Sanjay Singhal; Stewart Jacobson; Rick Miller
  - City Manager: Mike Goodrum

Area
  - Total: 42.90 sq mi (111.12 km^{2})
  - Land: 40.47 sq mi (104.81 km^{2})
  - Water: 2.44 sq mi (6.31 km^{2})
- Elevation: 100 ft (30 m)

Population (2020)
  - Total: 111,026
  - Density: 2,928.0/sq mi (1,130.49/km^{2})
- Time zone: UTC−6 (Central (CST))
  - Summer (DST): UTC−5 (CDT)
- ZIP Codes: 77478–79, 77487, 77496, and 77498
- Area codes: 281, 346, 621, 713, 832
- FIPS code: 48-70808
- GNIS feature ID: 1348034
- Website: www.sugarlandtx.gov

Sugar Land is the largest city in Fort Bend County, Texas, United States, located in the southwestern part of the Houston–Pasadena–The Woodlands metropolitan area. Located about 19 miles (31 km) southwest of downtown Houston, Sugar Land is a populous suburban municipality centered around the junction of Texas State Highway 6 and Interstate 69/U.S. Route 59.

Beginning in the 19th century, the present-day Sugar Land area was home to a large sugar plantation situated in the fertile floodplain of the Brazos River. Following the consolidation of local plantations into Imperial Sugar Company in 1908, Sugar Land grew steadily as a company town and incorporated as a city in 1959. Sugar Land has grown rapidly alongside other edge cities around Houston, with large-scale development of master-planned communities contributing to population swells since the 1980s.

Sugar Land is one of the fastest-growing cities in Texas. The 2020 United States Census reported that the city's population had grown more than 40% in the preceding 10 years following the annexation of the Greatwood and New Territory communities in December 2017. Over the same 10-year period, the number of employed persons living in Sugar Land increased by 61%.

Sugar Land is home to the headquarters of Imperial Sugar although the company's main sugar refinery and distribution center are no longer located in the city. The Imperial Sugar crown logo is featured in the city seal and logo.

== History ==
=== Sugar Land's founding ===
Sugar Land has roots in the original Mexican land grant made to Anglo-American Stephen F. Austin. One of the first settlers of the land, Samuel M. Williams, called this area Oakland Plantation. Williams' brother, Nathaniel, purchased the land from Austin in 1838. They developed the plantation by growing cotton, corn, and sugarcane. The neighborhood of First Colony, located in the town, refers to Stephen F. Austin's land grant, for it was one of the first Anglo settlements legally established in Texas.

During these early years, the plantation was the center of social life along the Brazos River. In 1853, Benjamin Terry and William J. Kyle purchased the Oakland Plantation from the Williams family. Terry is known for organizing a division of Texas Rangers during the Civil War and for naming the town.

Upon the deaths of Terry and Kyle, Colonel E. H. Cunningham bought the 12,500-acre (5,100 ha) plantation soon after the Civil War. He had a sugar-refining plant built here, and developed the town around it in 1879, platting the land and attracting settlers during the post-Reconstruction era.

=== Company town ===
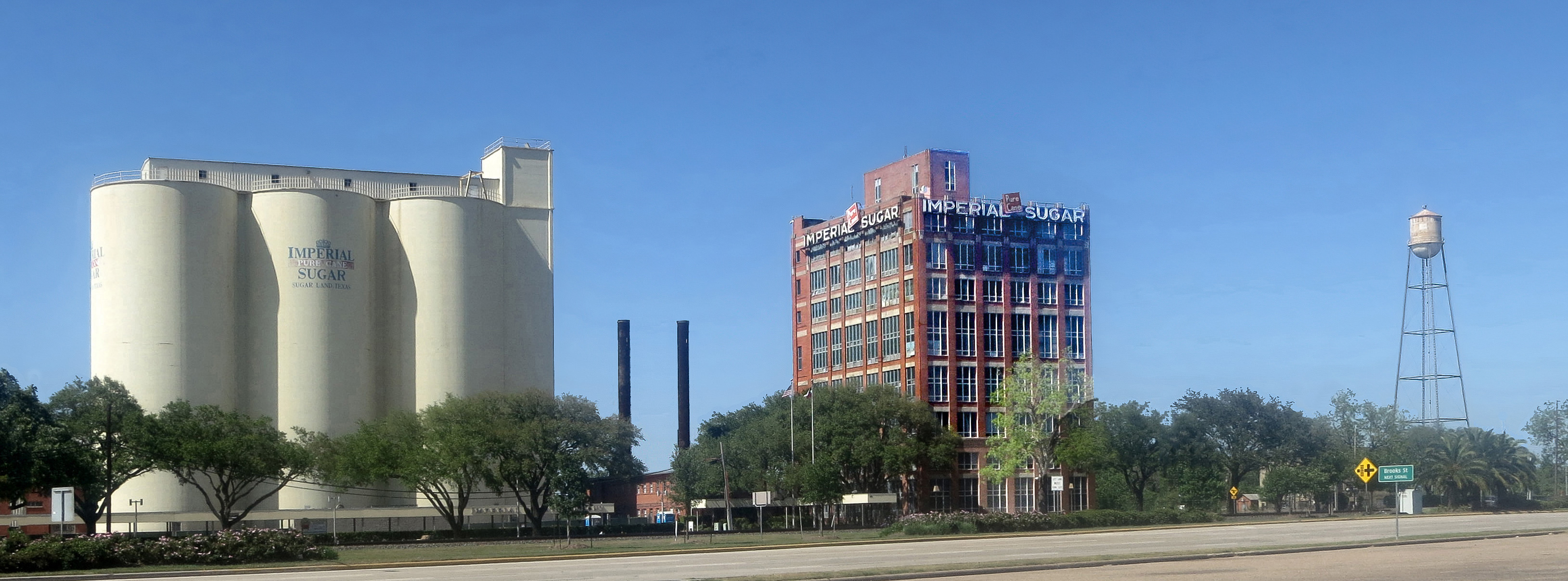
Sugar Land's former Imperial Sugar refinery

In 1906, the Kempner family of Galveston, under the leadership of Isaac H. Kempner, and in partnership with Logan J. Copenhaver, purchased the 5,300-acre (2,100 ha) Ellis Plantation, one of the few plantations in Fort Bend County to survive the Civil War. The Ellis Plantation had originally been part of the Jesse Cartwright league; Will Ellis had operated it after the Civil War by a system of tenant farming, made up mostly of African-American families who were previously enslaved on the land.

In 1908, the partnership acquired the adjoining 12,500-acre (5,100 ha) Cunningham Plantation, with its raw-sugar mill and cane-sugar refinery. The partnership changed the name to Imperial Sugar Company; Kempner associated the name "Imperial", which was also the name of a small raw-sugar mill on the Ellis Plantation, with the Imperial Hotel in New York City.

Around the turn of the 20th century, most of the sugarcane crops were destroyed by a harsh winter. As part of the Kempner-Copenhaver agreement, Copenhaver moved to the site to serve as general manager and build the company-owned town of Sugar Land.

The trains running through Sugar Land are on the route of the oldest railroad in Texas. They run adjacent to the sugar refinery, west of the town, and through the center of what used to be known as the Imperial State Prison Farm. It operated with convict lease labor. Between the end of the Civil War and 1912, more than 3,500 prisoners died in Texas as a result of the convict leasing program. Archaeologists have uncovered unmarked graves of African Americans from this period in the region around Sugar Land's prison and sugar factory. Since the early 21st century, this area has been largely redeveloped as the suburban planned community of Telfair.

From the 1910s until 1959, Sugar Land was a self-contained company town. Imperial Sugar Company provided housing for the workers, encouraged construction of schools, built a hospital to treat workers, and provided businesses to meet the workers' needs. Many of the original houses built by the Imperial Sugar Company remain in The Hill and Mayfield Park areas of Sugar Land, and have been passed down through generations of family members.

During the 1950s, Imperial Sugar expanded the town by developing a new subdivision, Venetian Estates, which featured waterfront homesites on Oyster Creek and on man-made lakes.

=== Development of city ===
As the company town expanded, so did the interest of establishing a municipal government. Voters chose to make Sugar Land a general-law city in 1959, with T. E. Harman becoming the first mayor.

In the early 1960s, a new subdivision development called Covington Woods was constructed. Later that year, the Imperial Cattle Ranch sold about 1,200 acres (490 ha) to a developer to create what became Sugar Creek in 1968. As a master-planned community, Sugar Creek introduced the concept of country club living to Sugar Land. Custom houses were built to surround two golf courses, and country clubs, swimming pools, and a private home security service were part of the amenities developed.

The success of Sugar Creek, buoyed by the construction of U.S. Highway 59, quickly made Sugar Land's vast farmlands attractive to real-estate developers for residential housing. In 1977, development began on First Colony, a master-planned community encompassing 10,000 acres (4,000 ha). Developed by a Gerald Hines-led consortium that became known as Sugarland Properties Inc., development on First Colony would continue over the next 30 years. The master-planned community offered homebuyers formal landscaping, extensive green belts, a golf course and country club, lakes and boulevards, neighborhood amenities, and shopping.

Around the same time as First Colony, another master-planned community development called Sugar Mill was started in the northern portion of Sugar Land, offering lakefront and estate lots. The master-planned communities of Greatwood and New Territory, at the time situated west of the city in what was then its extraterritorial jurisdiction, also began to be developed by the end of the 1980s.

In addition to the development of master-planned communities targeted at commuters from Houston, Sugar Land began attracting the attention of major corporations throughout the 1980s. Fluor Daniel, Schlumberger, Unocal, and others began to locate offices and facilities in the city. This resulted in a favorable 40/60 ratio of residential to commercial tax base within the city.

In 1981, a special city election was held for the purpose of establishing a home-rule municipal government. Voters approved the adoption of a home-rule charter, which established a mayor-council form of government, with all powers of the city vested in a council composed of a mayor and five councilmen, elected from single-member districts.

A special city election was held August 9, 1986, to submit the proposed changes to the electorate for consideration. By a majority of the voters, amendments to the charter were approved that provided for a change in the city's form of government from that of "mayor-council" (strong mayor) to that of a "council-manager" form of government, which provides for a professional city manager to be the chief administrative officer of the city. Approval of this amendment authorized the mayor to be a voting member of council, in addition to performing duties as presiding officer of the council.

Sugar Land annexed Sugar Creek in 1986, after the latter community was nearly built-out. That same year, the city organized the largest celebration in its history, the Texas Sesquicentennial Celebration, celebrating 150 years of Texan independence from Mexican rule (DGA).

=== Suburban expansion ===
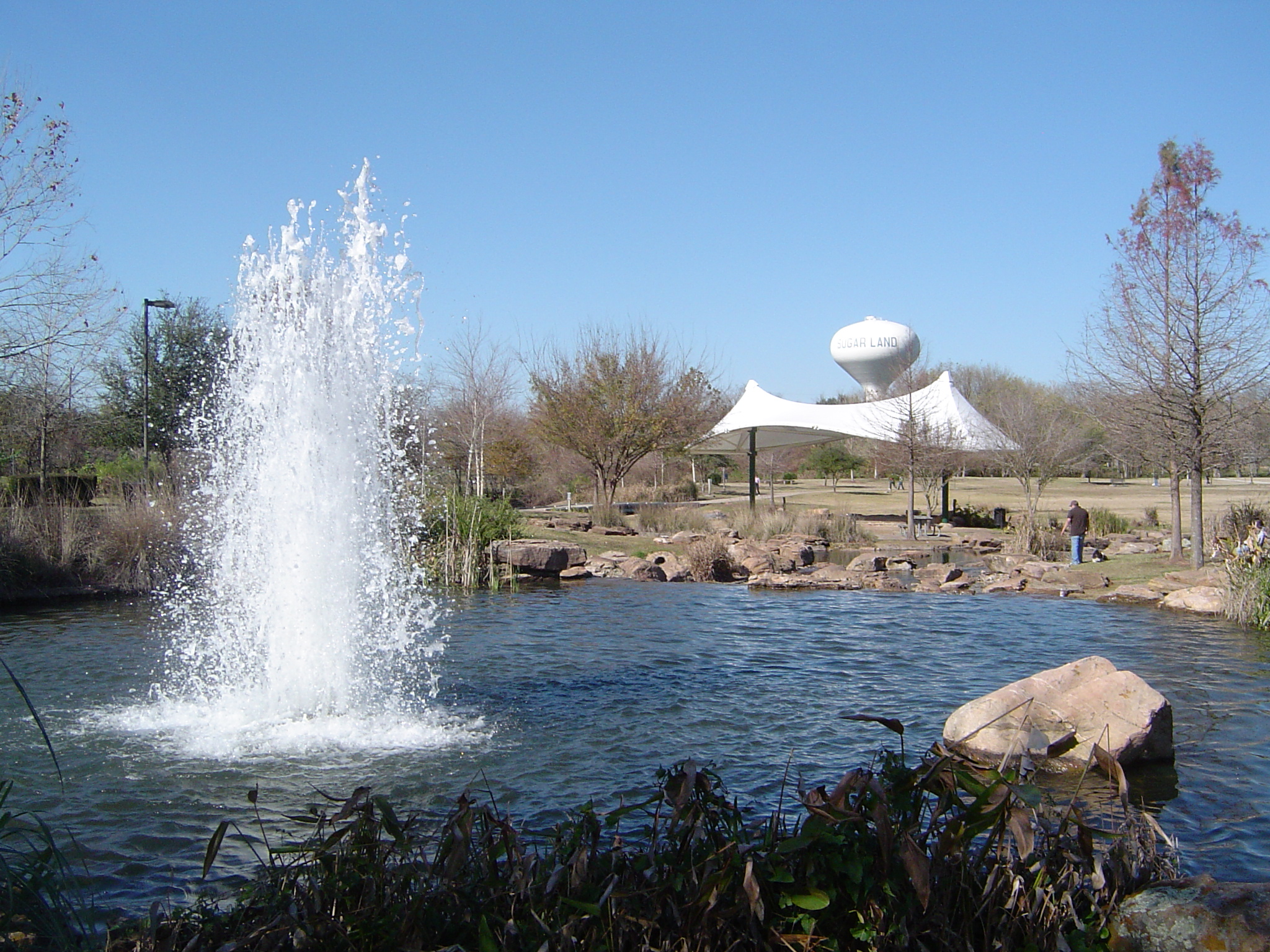
Oyster Creek Park

An amendment on May 5, 1990, changed the composition of the city council, adding a mayor and two council members, each to be elected at-large, to the five-member council. The at-large positions require election by a majority of voters, which reduces representation of any minority interests.

Throughout much of the 1990s, Sugar Land grew rapidly. The majority of residents are white-collar and college-educated, working in Houston's energy industry. An abundance of commercial development, with numerous low-rise office buildings, banks, and high-class restaurants, has taken place along both Interstate 69/U.S. Highway 59 and State Highway 6.

Sugar Land added to its tax base with the opening of First Colony Mall in 1996. The more than one-million-square-foot (100,000 m^{2}) mall, the first in Fort Bend County, is located at the busiest intersection of the city: Interstate 69/U.S. 59 and State Highway 6. The mall was named after the 10,000-acre (4,000 ha) master-planned community of First Colony.

In November 1997, Sugar Land annexed the remaining municipal utility districts of the 10,000-acre (4,000 ha) First Colony master-planned community, bringing the city's population to almost 60,000. This was Sugar Land's largest annexation at the time.

=== After 2000 ===
Sugar Land boasted the highest growth among Texas' largest cities, per the U.S. census 2000, when it had a population of 63,328. In 2003, Sugar Land became a "principal" city, recognized in the metropolitan area's official title change to Houston–Sugar Land–Baytown, with Sugar Land replacing Galveston as the second-most important city in the metropolitan area after Houston. The metro area was referred to as the Houston–The Woodlands–Sugar Land metropolitan area until 2023.

In 2002, the University of Houston System at Fort Bend moved to a new 250-acre (100 ha) campus located off the University Boulevard and Interstate 69/U.S. 59 intersection. The city helped fund the Albert and Mamie George Building, and as a result, the multi-institution teaching center was renamed as the University of Houston Sugar Land.

In 2003, the Imperial Sugar Company refinery plant and distribution center were closed, but the effect on the local economy was minimal. Sugar Land has become a Houston suburb rather than the blue-collar, agriculture-dependent town it was a generation ago. Many of its lower-income residents, including African American workers who at one time made up the majority working sugarcane, have been displaced and have had to seek work and housing elsewhere. The company maintains its headquarters in Sugar Land.

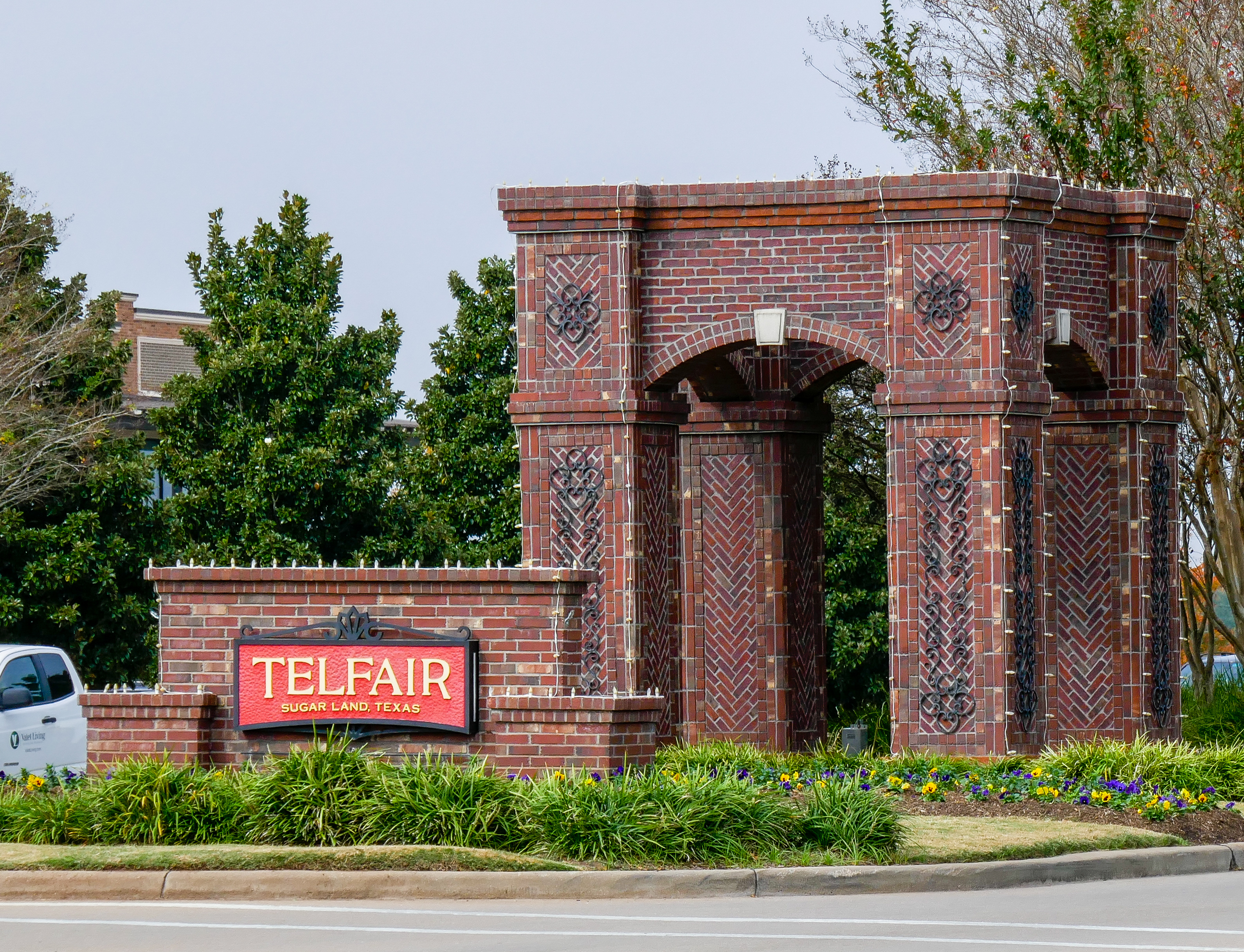
Entrance to Telfair master-planned community

The Texas Department of Transportation sold 2,018 acres (817 ha) of prison land in the western portion of Sugar Land to Newland Communities, a developer, by bid in 2003. The developer announced plans to build a new master-planned community called Telfair in this location. In July 2004, Sugar Land annexed all of this land into the city limits, extending the city limits westward. This was unusual, since Sugar Land had earlier annexed only built-out areas, not lands prior to development.

In December 2005, Sugar Land annexed the recently built-out, master-planned community of Avalon and four sections of Brazos Landing subdivision, adding about 3,200 residents. The city eventually annexed the communities of River Park, Greatwood, and New Territory, with the latter two being annexed on December 12, 2017, bringing the city proper's population to 117,869.

In the 2010s, development began on the Imperial master-planned community, located in undeveloped territory east of Sugar Land Regional Airport and incorporating the former refinery property of Imperial Sugar Company. This development includes Constellation Field, home of the Sugar Land Space Cowboys, originally an independent baseball team but later a member of affiliated Minor League Baseball. Retail needs are to be served in the planned Imperial Market development. In 2017, the 6,400-seat Smart Financial Centre concert hall opened.

== Geography ==
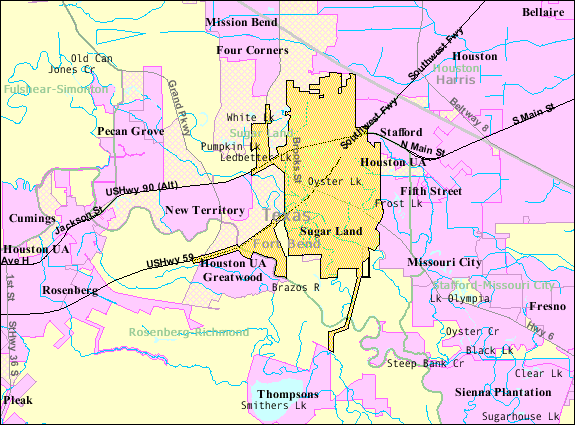
Map of Sugar Land

Sugar Land is located in northeast Fort Bend County, 20 miles (32 km) southwest of downtown Houston. It is bordered by Houston to the northeast, and by Stafford, Missouri City, and Meadows Place to the east. According to the United States Census Bureau, the city of Sugar Land has a total area of 42.9 square miles (111.1 km^{2}), of which 40.5 square miles (104.8 km^{2}) are land and 2.4 square miles (6.3 km^{2}), or 5.7%, are covered by water. The elevation of most of the city is between 70 and 90 feet (21 and 27 m) above sea level. The elevation of Sugar Land Regional Airport (SGR) is 82 feet (25 m).

Sugar Land has two major waterways running through the city. The southwestern and southern portion of the city were developed along the Brazos River, which runs into Brazoria County. Oyster Creek runs from the northwest to the eastern portion of the city limits and into Missouri City. Sugar Land developers have built many artificial lakes connecting to Oyster Creek or the Brazos River, as part of new master-planned communities.

Sugar Land and other surrounding areas are subsiding, and the rate of subsidence is increasing. The area sank about 1 foot between 1943 and 1964, while it sank over 6 feet between 1988 and 2016. Currently, it is estimated that Sugar Land is subsiding at a rate of between 10 and 25 millimeters per year. The subsidence is exacerbated by climate change, increased suburban development, and inadequate replenishment. The subsidence has significant human cost. For example, the historic flooding caused by Hurricane Harvey was worse than it would have otherwise been due to the effect, and houses and buildings in the city are sinking and having their foundations damaged. To manage the rapidly increasing subsidence, the Texas State Legislature created the Fort Bend Subsidence District in 1989. The US Geologic Survey and the US Army Corps of Engineers have performed studies and monitoring of the subsidence.

=== Hydrology ===
Sugar Land sits atop three aquifers: Chicot, Evangeline, and Jasper. The Chicot and Evangeline Aquifers have been the primary source of municipal water for Sugar Land, Houston, Galveston and other surrounding areas. The Jasper Aquifer is the only one of the three that is not used to extract drinking water. Due to the rapid building of suburbs in the city and surrounding region, aquifer replenishment has significantly decreased. The city government has enacted a program to manage the aquifers.

=== Geology ===
Underpinning the area's land surface are unconsolidated clays, clay shales, and poorly cemented sands, extending to depths of several miles. The region's geology developed from stream deposits from the erosion of the Rocky Mountains. These sediments consist of a series of sands and clays deposited on decaying organic matter that, over time, were transformed into oil and natural gas. Beneath these tiers is a water-deposited layer of halite, a rock salt. The porous layers were compressed over time and forced upward. As it pushed upward, the salt dragged surrounding sediments into dome shapes, often trapping oil and gas that seeped from the surrounding porous sands.

The region is earthquake-free. While the neighboring city of Houston contains 86 mapped and historically active surface faults with an aggregate length of 149 miles (240 km), the clay below the surface in Sugar Land precludes the buildup of friction that produces ground shaking in earthquakes. These faults move only very gradually in what is termed "fault creep".

=== Climate ===
Sugar Land's climate is classified as being humid subtropical, featuring two seasons, a wet season from April to October, and a dry season from November to March. The city is located in the Gulf coastal plains biome, and the vegetation is classified as a temperate grassland. The average yearly precipitation is 48 inches. Prevailing winds are from the south and southeast during most of the year, bringing heat and moisture from the Gulf of Mexico.

In the summer, daily high temperatures are in the 95 °F (35 °C) range throughout much of July and August. The air tends to feel still and the abundant humidity, with dewpoints typically in the low to mid-70°Fs, creates a heat index around 100 °F each day. Summer thunderstorms are common with 30 to 50% of the days having thunder. The highest temperature recorded in the area was 109 °F in August 2023.

Winters in the area are cool and mild. The average winter high/low is 62/45 °F (16/7 °C). The coldest period is usually in January, when north winds bring winter rains. Snow is almost unheard of and typically does not accumulate. One such rare snowstorm hit Houston on Christmas Eve 2004. A few inches accumulated, but had melted by the next afternoon. The earliest snowfall to occur in any winter fell on December 4, 2009.

Climate data for Sugar Land Memorial Park, 2006-2020 normals
Month	Jan	Feb	Mar	Apr	May	Jun	Jul	Aug	Sep	Oct	Nov	Dec	Year
Mean daily maximum °F (°C)	64.3 (17.9)	68.4 (20.2)	75.0 (23.9)	80.6 (27.0)	87.0 (30.6)	92.5 (33.6)	93.8 (34.3)	95.1 (35.1)	90.2 (32.3)	83.4 (28.6)	73.9 (23.3)	66.4 (19.1)	80.9 (27.2)
Mean daily minimum °F (°C)	43.0 (6.1)	48.0 (8.9)	54.9 (12.7)	60.1 (15.6)	67.9 (19.9)	73.6 (23.1)	75.1 (23.9)	75.2 (24.0)	71.2 (21.8)	61.1 (16.2)	52.0 (11.1)	46.1 (7.8)	60.7 (15.9)
Average precipitation inches (mm)	3.60 (91)	2.31 (59)	3.17 (81)	4.75 (121)	6.11 (155)	3.97 (101)	4.79 (122)	5.90 (150)	4.66 (118)	4.36 (111)	2.57 (65)	3.40 (86)	49.59 (1,260)

=== Districts and communities ===
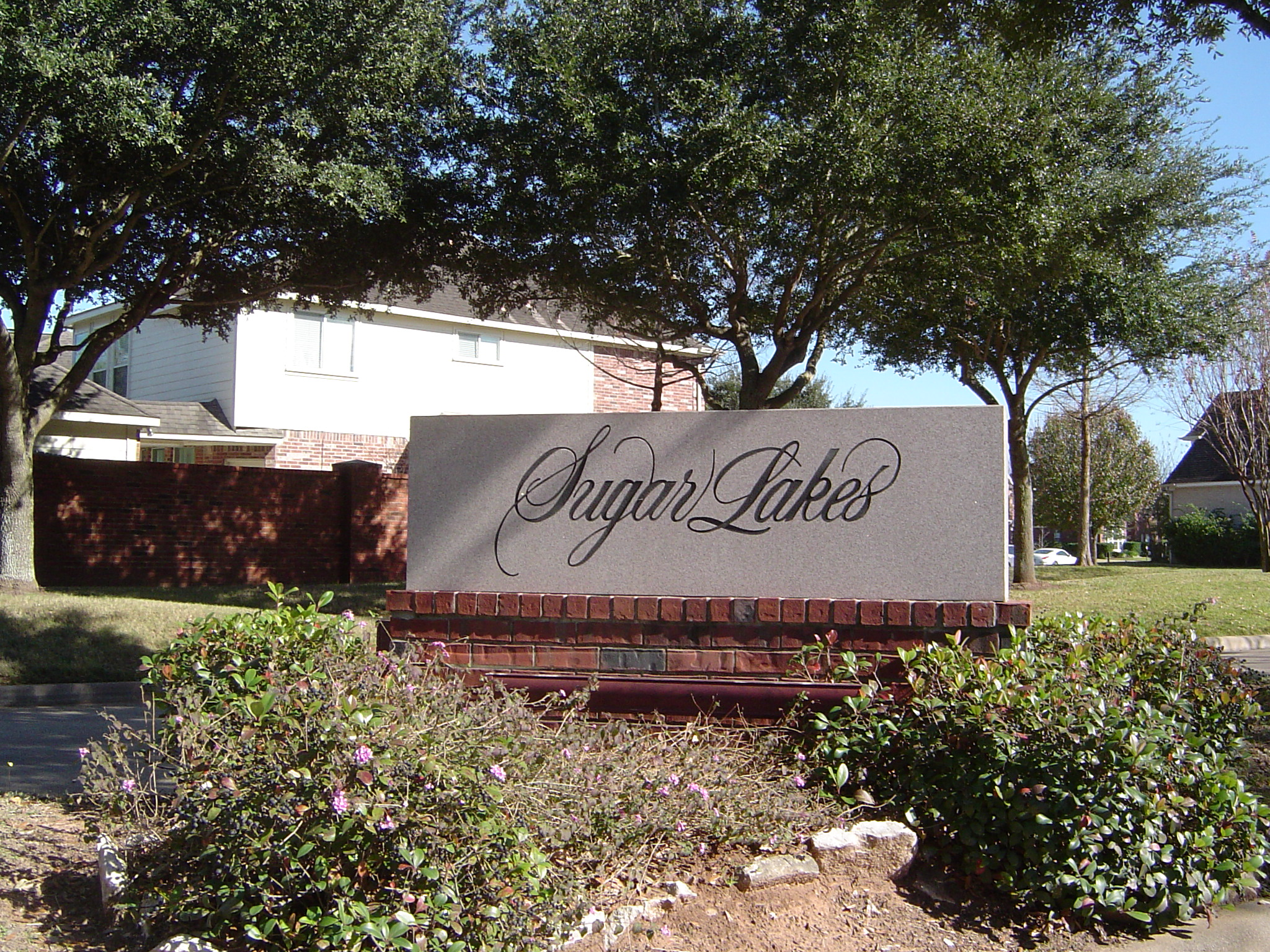
Sugar Lakes planned community

Sugar Land has the most master-planned communities in Fort Bend County, which is home to the largest number of master-planned communities in the nation—including First Colony, Greatwood, New Territory, Telfair, Sugar Creek, River Park, Imperial, Riverstone and many others. Many of the communities feature golf courses, country clubs, and lakes. The first master-planned community to be developed in Sugar Land was Sugar Creek. There are now a total of thirteen master-planned communities located in Sugar Land's city limits and its extraterritorial jurisdiction combined.

The northern portion of Sugar Land, sometimes referred to by residents and government officials as "Old Sugar Land", comprises all the communities north of U.S. Highway 90A, but it also includes the subdivisions/areas of Venetian Estates, and Belknap/Brookside, which is just south of U.S. 90A. Most of this area was the original city limits of Sugar Land when it was incorporated in 1959. Located in this part of town is the former Imperial Sugar Company refinery and distribution center that was shut down in 2003, even though the company's headquarters are still located within the city. To the east of northern Sugar Land is the Sugar Land Business Park, the largest business and industrial area in the city. Many of the city's electronic and energy companies are located here, including the future North American headquarters of Schlumberger. The Imperial master-planned community, including Constellation Field and the future Imperial Market development, is also located in north Sugar Land.

The largest economic and entertainment activities are in the areas of south and southeastern Sugar Land. Most of the population in the city limits are concentrated here. This area is all master-planned communities and it includes nearly all of First Colony, the largest in Sugar Land encompassing 10,000 acres (40 km^{2}). Other master-planned communities in this area are Sugar Creek, Sugar Lakes, Commonwealth, Avalon, Telfair, and Riverstone. This area is the location of First Colony Mall, Sugar Land Town Square, the new Sugar Land City Hall, and other major commercial areas. This area boasts a wide range of recreational activities including three golf courses and country clubs, including Sweetwater Country Club (the former home of the LPGA), as well as the Sugar Land Ice & Sports Center (formerly Sugar Land Aerodrome).

The southwestern area of Sugar Land was recently annexed into the city limits, and is sometimes referred to as the "other side of the river". This is due to this area being separated from the rest of Sugar Land by the Brazos River, as well as being served by the Lamar Consolidated Independent School District. The southwest side has two master-planned communities, Greatwood and River Park. Other communities in this area are Canyon Gate on the Brazos and Tara Colony, the latter an older large subdivision which has a Richmond address but is actually in the extraterritorial jurisdiction of Sugar Land and up for future annexation.

The western portion of Sugar Land was also fully incorporated into the city limits in 2017. It is home to two master-planned communities, New Territory and Telfair, the latter of which was previously prison farm land owned by the Texas Department of Criminal Justice. It was sold in 2003 and annexed to the city limits by Sugar Land in 2004. A new highway, State Highway 99 (more commonly known as the "Grand Parkway"), opened in 1994 as a major arterial in this area. North of this area and U.S. Highway 90A is the Sugar Land Regional Airport and the recently decommissioned Texas Department of Corrections Central Unit, which in 2011 became the first Texas prison to be closed without a replacement facility and is being targeted by the city for future light industrial development.

The Fluor Corporation, a prominent engineering company in the United States, moved from a large office campus in Sugar Land, and Sugar Land officials sought to replace it with a sprawling mixed development area.

== Demographics ==
Historical population
Census	Pop.	Note	%±
1950	2,285		—
1960	2,802		22.6%
1970	3,318		18.4%
1980	8,826		166.0%
1990	24,529		177.9%
2000	63,328		158.2%
2010	78,817		24.5%
2020	111,026		40.9%
U.S. Decennial Census

=== Racial and ethnic composition ===
Sugar Land city, Texas – Racial and ethnic composition Note: the US Census treats Hispanic/Latino as an ethnic category. This table excludes Latinos from the racial categories and assigns them to a separate category. Hispanics/Latinos may be of any race.
Race / ethnicity (NH = Non-Hispanic)	2020	2010	2000	1990	1980
White alone (NH)	38.1% (42,305)	44.4% (35,014)	60.8% (38,526)	73.8% (18,110)	83.5% (7,367)
Black alone (NH)	7.2% (7,969)	7.3% (5,744)	5.1% (3,242)	4.9% (1,196)	4.9% (434)
American Indian alone (NH)	0.1% (150)	0.2% (135)	0.2% (112)	0.2% (38)	0% (0)
Asian alone (NH)	38.4% (42,639)	35.1% (27,672)	23.8% (15,042)	12.6% (3,100)	1.1% (94)
Pacific Islander alone (NH)	0% (30)	0% (26)	0% (18)		
Other race alone (NH)	0.5% (578)	0.2% (179)	0.2% (109)	0% (8)	0% (0)
Multiracial (NH)	3.5% (3,925)	2.2% (1,723)	1.9% (1,226)	—	—
Hispanic/Latino (any race)	12.1% (13,430)	10.6% (8,324)	8% (5,053)	8.5% (2,077)	10.5% (931)

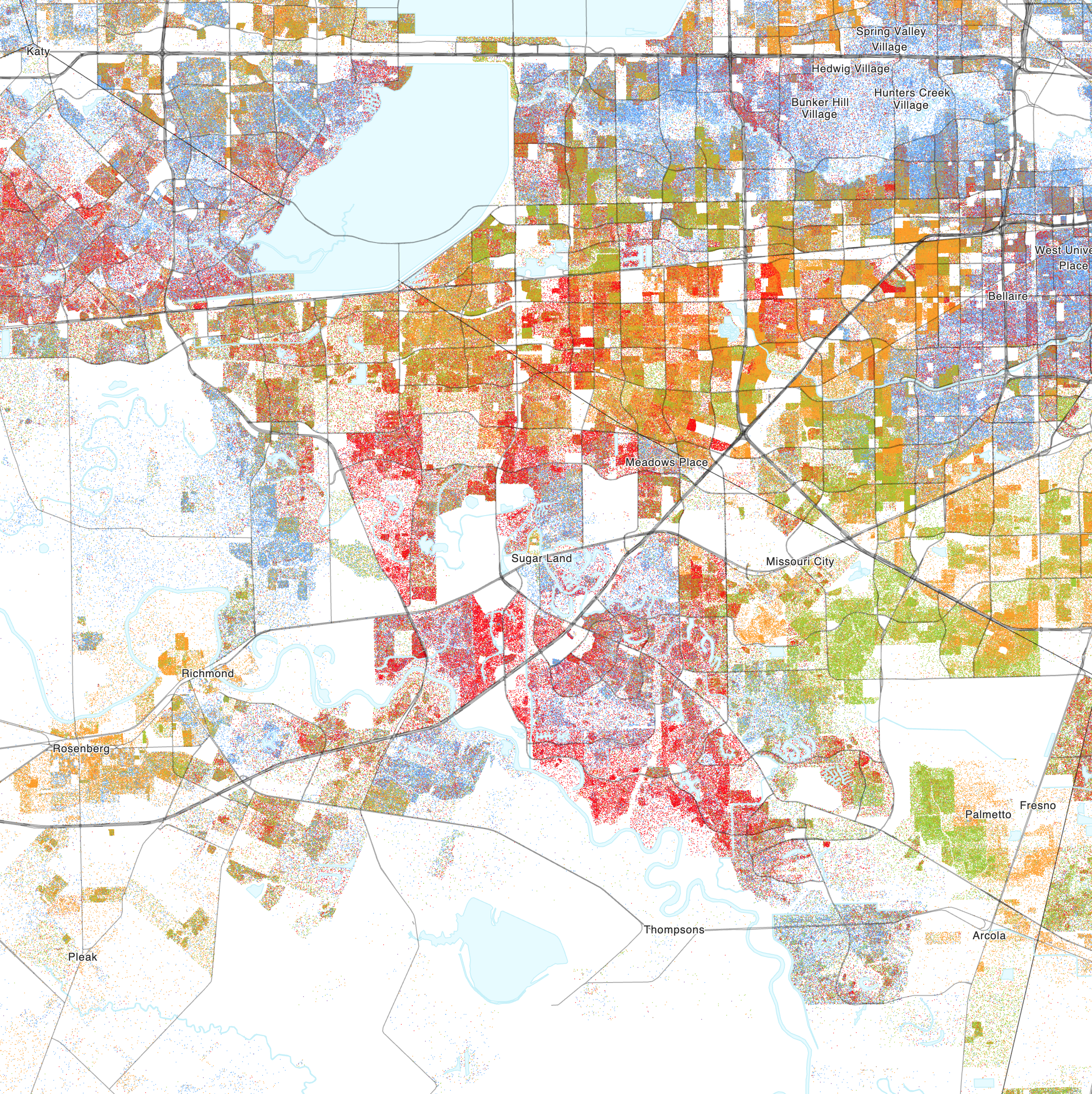
Map of racial distribution in Sugar Land, 2020 U.S. census. Each dot is one person: ⬤ White ⬤ Black ⬤ Asian ⬤ Hispanic ⬤ Multiracial ⬤ Native American/other

=== 2020 census ===
As of the 2020 census, Sugar Land had a population of 111,026, 38,100 households, and 31,110 families. The population density was 2,743.6 per square mile (1,059.3/km^{2}), and there were 40,118 housing units at an average density of 991.4 per square mile (382.8/km^{2}). 100.0% of residents lived in urban areas, while 0.0% lived in rural areas. Of the housing units, 5.0% were vacant; the homeowner vacancy rate was 1.8% and the rental vacancy rate was 10.2%.

Of the 38,100 households, 37.5% had children under the age of 18; 68.8% were married couples living together; 10.3% had a male householder with no spouse or partner present, and 18.5% had a female householder with no spouse or partner present. About 16.1% of all households were made up of individuals, and 7.8% had someone living alone who was 65 years of age or older. The average household size was 3.0 and the average family size was 3.4. The percent of those with a bachelor’s degree or higher was estimated to be 46.8% of the population.

23.0% of the population was under the age of 18, 7.9% from 18 to 24, 21.6% from 25 to 44, 29.7% from 45 to 64, and 17.8% who were 65 years of age or older. The median age was 43.2 years. For every 100 females, there were 95.3 males, and for every 100 females age 18 and over, there were 92.7 males.

The racial makeup was 40.7% (45,186) white or European American (38.1% non-Hispanic white), 7.32% (8,122) black or African-American, 0.33% (367) Native American or Alaska Native, 38.58% (42,831) Asian, 0.04% (40) Pacific Islander or Native Hawaiian, 3.14% (3,482) from other races, and 9.91% (10,998) from two or more races. Hispanic or Latino people of any race were 12.1% (13,430) of the population.

Racial composition as of the 2020 census
Race	Number	Percent
White	45,186	40.7%
Black or African American	8,122	7.3%
American Indian and Alaska Native	367	0.3%
Asian	42,831	38.6%
Native Hawaiian and Other Pacific Islander	40	0.0%
Some other race	3,482	3.1%
Two or more races	10,998	9.9%
Hispanic or Latino (of any race)	13,430	12.1%

The most reported ancestries in 2020 were:

- Indian (13.1%)
- English (11.2%)
- Chinese (10.6%)
- German (9.5%)
- Irish (7.4%)
- Mexican (6.9%)
- Pakistani (5.9%)
- Vietnamese (5.2%)
- African American (4.1%)
- Italian (2.7%)

The 2016–2020 5-year American Community Survey estimates show that the median household income was $123,261 (with a margin of error of +/- $5,980). The median family income was $138,436 (+/- $6,912). Males had a median income of $72,404 (+/- $4,690) versus $42,910 (+/- $2,800) for females. The median income for those above 16 years old was $56,192 (+/- $3,664). Approximately, 3.6% of families and 4.4% of the population were below the poverty line, including 4.3% of those under the age of 18 and 5.2% of those ages 65 or over.

=== 2010 census ===
In 2010, the racial makeup of the city was 52.0% White, 7.4% African American, 0.2% Native American, 35.3% Asian, 2.34% other race, and 2.8% from two or more races. Hispanics or Latinos of any race were 10.6% of the population. Sugar Land has the highest concentration of Asian Americans in Texas. Altogether in 2010, 10.7% were Indian, 11.5% Chinese, 4.5% Vietnamese, and 2.0% Filipino. There is also a sizable Pakistani community in Sugar Land. As of 2013, about one-third of the Asian population was Indian American, according to Harish Jajoo, a former city council member of Indian origin. The Sugar Land area has Indian grocery stores, temples, several mosques and many Ismaili Jamatkhanas. Sugar Land is the national headquarters for the United States Ismaili Community. Jajoo stated that the quality of the jobs, schools, and parks attracts people of Indian origin to Sugar Land.

Of the 26,709 households, 40.7% had children under 18 living with them, 70.0% were married couples living together, 8.6% had a female householder with no husband present, and 18.1% were not families. About 15.6% of all households were made up of individuals, and 5.3% were someone living alone who was 65 years of age or older. The average household size was 2.90, and the average family size was 3.25.

In the city, the age distribution was 24.6% under 18, 7.5% from 18 to 24, 23.4% from 25 to 44, 34.0% from 45 to 64, and 10.4% who were 65 or older. The median age was 41.2 years. For every 100 females, there were 98.6 males. For every 100 females age 18 and over, there were 95.6 males.

According to the 2014 American Community Survey, the median income for a household in the city was $115,069, and for a family was $132,534. Male full-time workers had a median income of $98,892 versus $60,053 for females. The per capita income for the city was $48,653. About 6.4% of families and 9.9% of the population were below the poverty line, including 13.5% of those under age 18 and 5.5% of those age 65 or over.

=== Religion ===
==== Catholicism ====
Catholics account for over 30% of the city population, with 11,998 households registered by St. Laurence, St. Thomas Aquinas, and St. Theresa parishes.

The Roman Catholic Archdiocese of Galveston-Houston operates three churches in Sugar Land:

- St. Laurence Church – Its sanctuary had its dedication ceremony in 1992. By 2006 St. Laurence had 4,600 families on its rolls and was oversubscribed. Its service area previously included Sienna Plantation.
- St. Theresa Church – The Imperial Sugar Company donated the land for the church, which opened in 1924. In 1955 the Basilian Fathers began serving as employees. In 2006 it was finalizing expansion plans, which originated from a 2005 survey.
- St. Thomas Aquinas Church

==== Hinduism ====
The BAPS Shri Swaminarayan Mandir Houston, a Swaminarayan sect Hindu temple, is along Brand Lane in unincorporated Fort Bend County, near Stafford and Sugar Land.

The Sri Saumyakasi, a Sugar Land Chinmaya Hindu temple, opened in December 2007. It is the only Hindu temple in the city devoted to Shiva. The Chinmaya Mission Houston started in 1982. Originally classes were held in an apartment. In a ten year period the members raised $2.5 million for the permanent temple.

Shri Krishna Vrundavana has a Sugar Land postal address, but is physically in the Alief super neighborhood in the Houston city limits. It occupies the 450-person, 9,000-square-foot (840 m^{2}) former La Festa Hall. It was established in 2011 with about 200 people in its congregation; originally the temple rented its property. In October 2015 the temple organizers bought the current site for $1.3 million. In December 2015 its congregation had numbered over 800.

Sri Ashtalakshmi Temple, devoted to the eight forms of Lakshmi and lord Lakshmi Narayana, and the Statue of Union, a 90 foot tall statue of Abhaya Hanuman, both affiliated with HH Tridandi Chinna Srimannarayana Ramanuja Jeeyar Swami, are located along Synott Road. While Sri Ashtalakshmi Temple is located in Fort Bend County and has a Sugar Land 77498 mailing address, it is inside the Houston city limits as part of District F, as Sugar Land's municipal city limits stop just south of the temple at West Bellfort Avenue.

==== Islam ====
The Islamic Society of Greater Houston operates two mosques in the area, Masjid Maryam (New Territory Islamic Center) and Masjid At-Taqwa (Synott Islamic Center).

== Economy ==
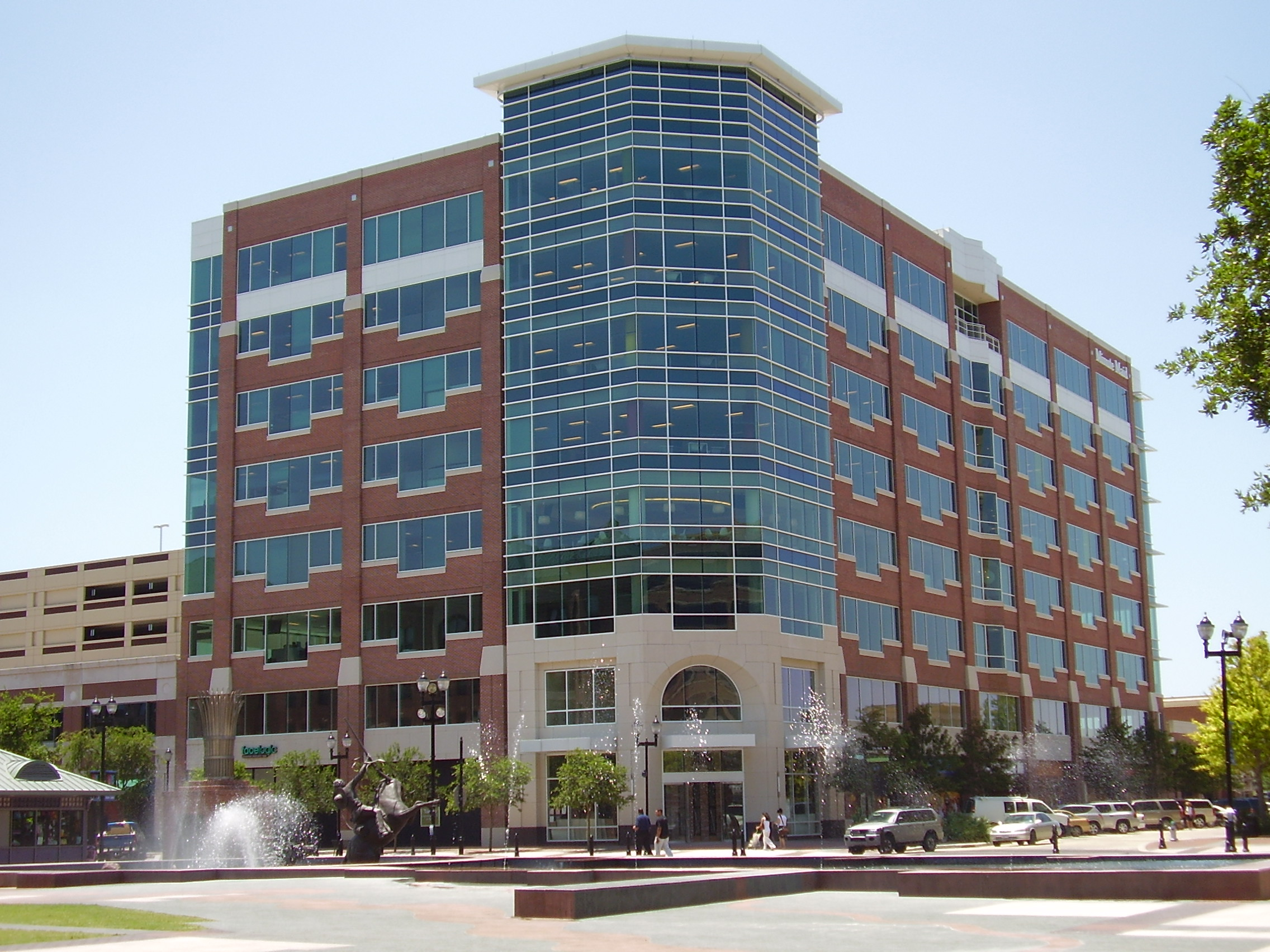
Minute Maid headquarters, Sugar Land Town Square, First Colony

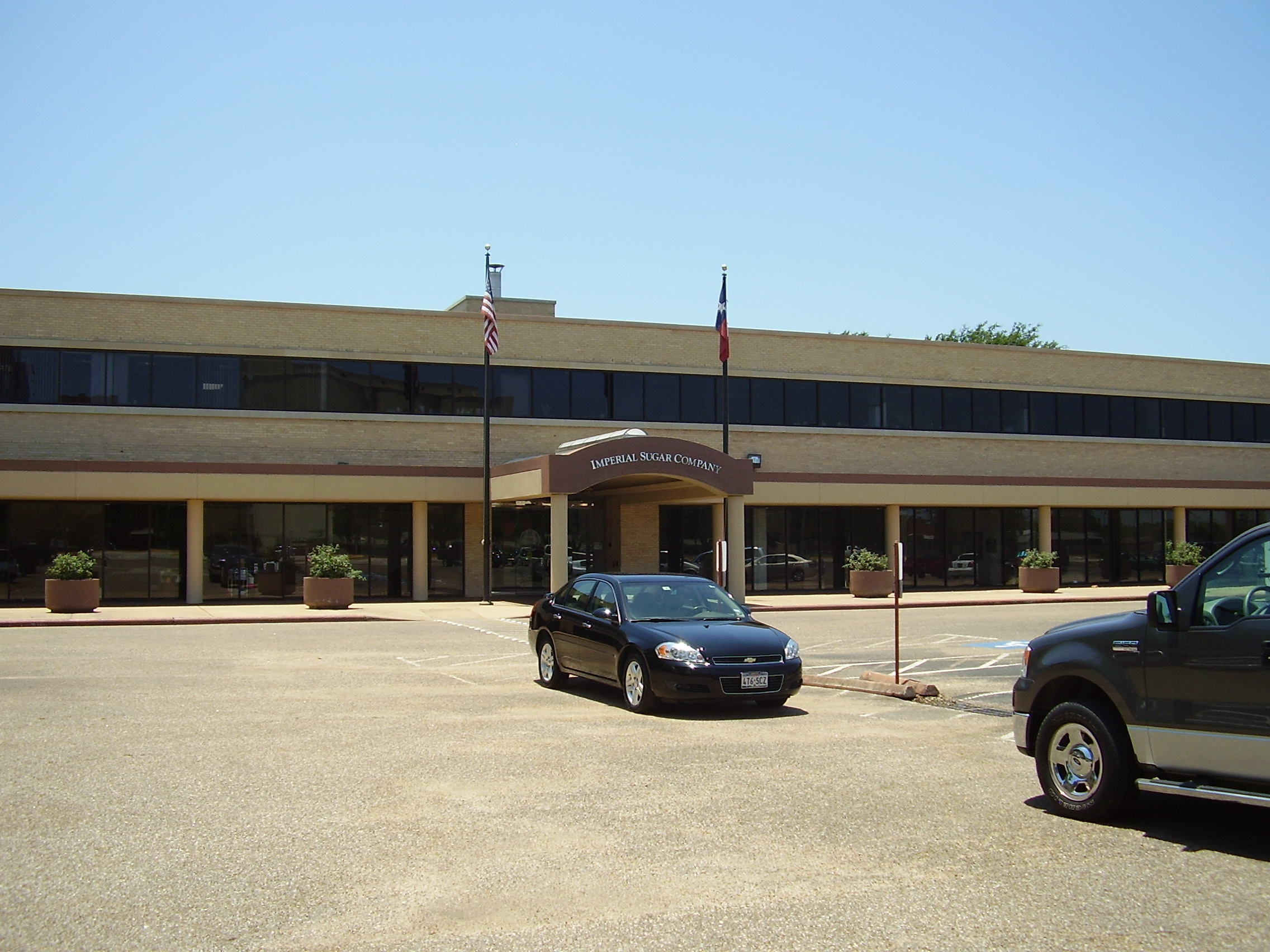
Imperial Sugar offices

As in the rest of the Greater Houston area, the energy industry presence is large, specifically petroleum exploration and refining. Sugar Land holds the headquarters to Fortune 500 company CVR Energy, Inc. (NYSE: CVI), Western Airways, and NalcoChampion's Energy Services division. CVR Energy was listed as the city's only resident 2012 Fortune 500 company and the Houston Chronicle ranked it the No. 5 public company in the Houston area. Sugar Land also has a large number of international energy, software, engineering, and product firms.

Sugar Land is home to the headquarters of the Imperial Sugar Company. It was once the home of the company's main (and sole) refinery and distribution center. The refinery and distribution center have been closed since 2003.

Schlumberger, an oil services company, moved its Houston-area offices from 5000 Gulf Freeway in Houston to a campus in Sugar Land in 1995. This 33-acre (13 ha) campus is at the northeast corner of U.S. Highway 90A and Gillingham Lane. (The former Gulf Freeway headquarters was repurposed as the University of Houston Energy Research Park after 2009.)

As of 2015, Schlumberger was the second-largest employer in Sugar Land. In 2015, Schlumberger announced that it was moving its U.S. corporate headquarters to the Sugar Land facility from a Houston office building. The company plans to build new buildings with a scheduled completion time of late 2017. They include a total of 250,000 square feet (23,000 m^{2}) of class A office space and an "amenities" building with 100,000 square feet (9,300 m^{2}) of space.

Fluor Daniel also has a major office in Sugar Land. Minute Maid opened its headquarters in Sugar Land Town Square in First Colony on February 16, 2009; previously, it was headquartered in 2000 St. James Place in Houston.

In 1991, BMC Software leased about 120,000 square feet (11,000 m^{2}) at the Sugar Creek National Bank Building and about 16,000 square feet (1,500 m^{2}) in the Fluor Daniel Building, both in Sugar Land. BMC planned to vacate both Sugar Land facilities when its current headquarters, located in Westchase, opened; BMC's headquarters were scheduled to open in 1993.

=== Largest employers ===
According to the city's 2019 Comprehensive Annual Financial Report, the largest employers in the city are:

No.	Employer	No. of employees
1	Methodist Sugar Land Hospital	2,400
2	Fluor Enterprises, Inc	1,980
3	Schlumberger	1,900
4	Nalco Champion	1,216
5	Memorial Hermann Sugar Land	800
6	St. Luke's Hospital Sugar Land	473
7	Accredo Packaging	425
8	Baker Hughes	422
9	Applied Optoelectronics	396
10	AmerisourceBergen Drug Company	380

== Government and infrastructure ==
=== Local government ===
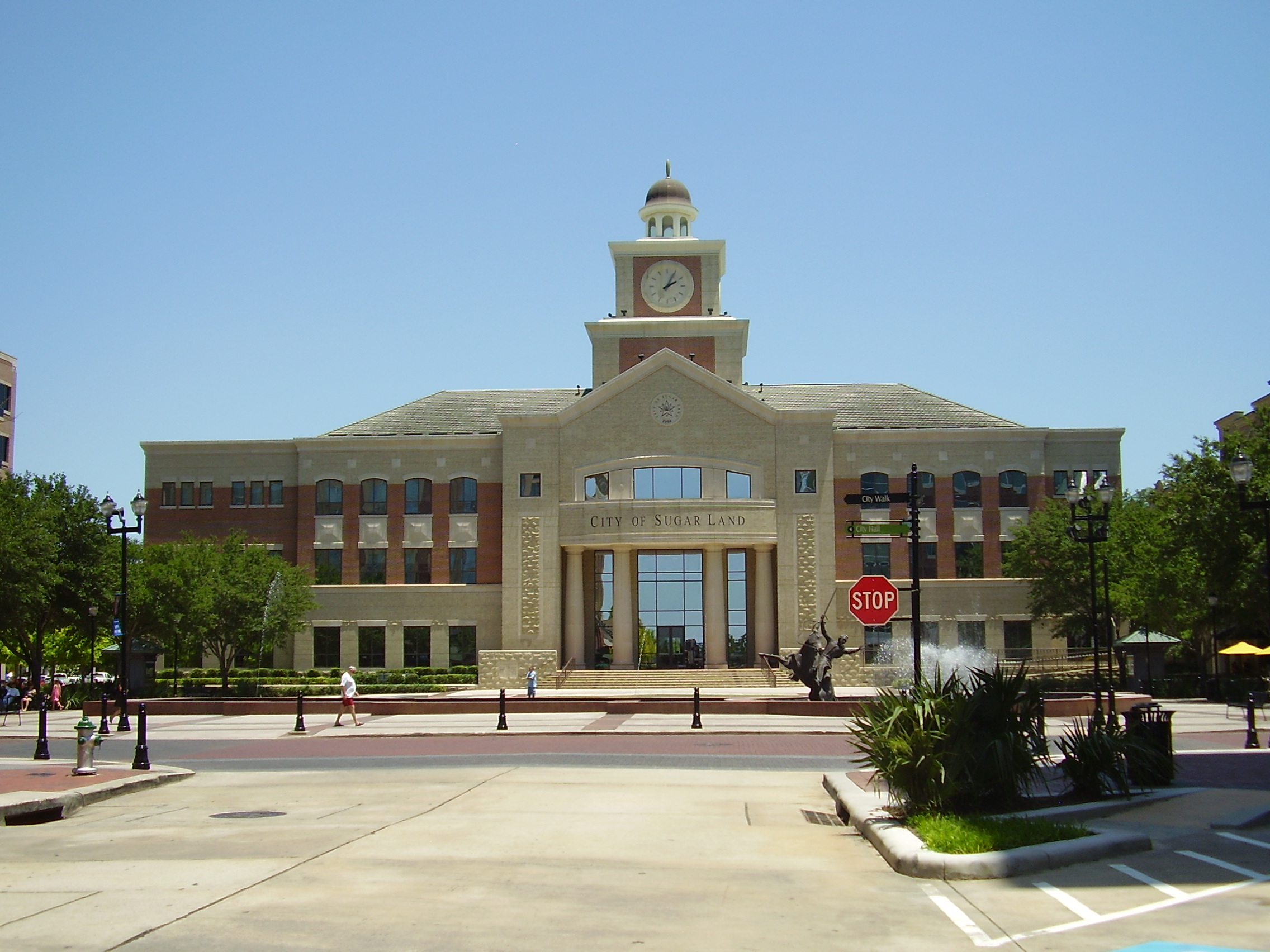
City of Sugar Land City Hall, Sugar Land Town Square, First Colony

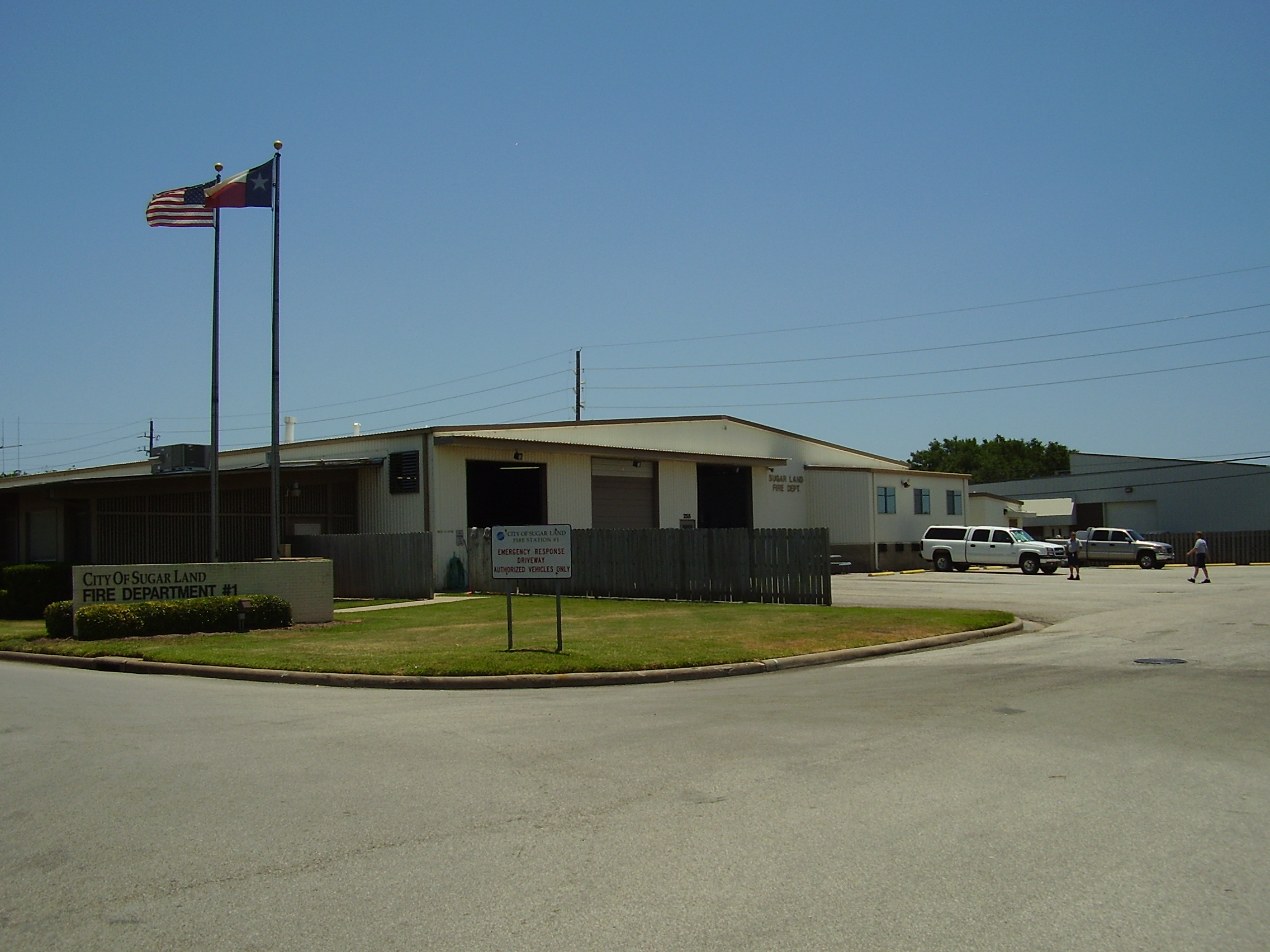
The grounds of Sugar Land Fire Department #1 house the City of Sugar Land Fire Department offices, and at one time housed City Hall.

Sugar Land operates under the council-manager form of government. The council appoints the city manager, who acts as the chief executive officer of the government. The city manager carries out policy and administers city programs. All department heads, including the city attorney, police chief and fire chief, are responsible to the city manager.

Sugar Land's composition of the city council consists of a mayor, four councilmembers elected by single-member districts in odd-numbered years, and two councilmembers by at-large positions in even-numbered years with the mayor.

Some of the strengths of the council-manager form of government as opposed to a strong-mayor form of government include - all councilmembers have equal rights, obligations and opportunities, the power is assigned to the council as a whole, and the city manager must be responsive in providing day-to-day services to citizens.

Sugar Land has had four city managers since instituting the council-manager form of government in 1986:

- William H. Lewis (1986–1988)
- David Neeley (1988–2001)
- Allen Bogard (2001–2020)
- Michael Goodrum (2020–present)

The average tenure nationwide for municipal and county managers is 7.4 years. The City of Sugar Land's last two city managers have had an average tenure of over 13 years.

The city hall was built as part of the Sugar Land Town Square development in First Colony. Prior to the opening of the current city hall, city hall was located at 10405 Corporate Drive. That space was converted for use by the offices of the Sugar Land Fire Department.

Sugar Land has had ten mayors:

- T. E. Harman (1959–1961)
- Bill Little (1962–1967)
- C. E. McFadden (1968–1972)
- Roy Cordes Sr. (1972–1981)
- Walter McMeans (1981–1986)
- Lee Duggan (1987–1996)
- Dean A. Hrbacek (1996–2002)
- David G. Wallace (2002–2008)
- James A. Thompson (2008–2016)
- Joe R. Zimmerman (2016–2025)
- Carol K. McCutcheon (2025–present)

=== Politics ===
At the start of the 21st century, Sugar Land was well-known as a Republican stronghold. More recently, the city has been trending Democratic in presidential elections; after voting Republican in 2012 and 2016, Sugar Land was won by Joe Biden in 2020.

Sugar Land is located in Texas's 22nd congressional district. It is represented in the US House of Representatives by Republican Troy Nehls, a former Fort Bend county sheriff. The district had long elected former House Majority Leader Tom DeLay, who served from here from 1985 until his 2006 resignation. Previously in 1976, Republicans ran a write-in campaign and gained election of Republican Ron Paul, who served briefly in 1976. He ran for a full term in 1978, serving from 1979 until 1985.

In the Texas Legislature, most of Sugar Land is represented in District 17 of the Texas Senate, which is represented by Republican Joan Huffman. Some western segments of the city and its extraterritorial jurisdiction, including the master-planned communities of New Territory, Greatwood, River Park and Telfair, are situated in District 18, represented by Republican Lois Kolkhorst. She succeeded Glenn Hegar in a 2014 special election following the latter's election as Texas State Comptroller earlier that year.

In the Texas House of Representatives, most of Sugar Land is located in District 26, which is represented by Republican Rick Miller, a retired United States Navy officer and current Sugar Land businessman. Some parts of the city are also represented by Democrat Ron Reynolds (the Sugar Land Business Park) in District 27 and Republican Phil Stephenson in District 85 (the River Park, Commonwealth and Riverstone communities).

=== Sugar Land Hospitals ===
There is a cluster of medical centers near Sugar Land's Town Center, including a CHI St. Luke's hospital complex and the Sugar Land Medical Center, which contains numerous medical offices and clinics near Southwest Freeway. Fort Bend County does not have a hospital district, a legal entity to provide healthcare services. OakBend Medical Center serves as the county's charity hospital which the county contracts with.

=== State government ===
The Texas Department of Criminal Justice (TDCJ) operates the Jester State Prison Farm complex (Jester I, Vance, Jester III, and Jester IV) in an unincorporated area near Sugar Land.

The TDCJ operated the Central Unit in Sugar Land. The Central Unit was the only state prison within the city limits of Sugar Land. The Sugar Land Distribution Center, a TDCJ men's correctional supply warehouse, was inside the Central Unit compound. In 2011 the TDCJ announced that the prison was closing and would be vacant by the end of August of that year. With the prison's closing, Sugar Land became the first Texas city to have its state prison close without a replacement facility.

=== Post offices ===
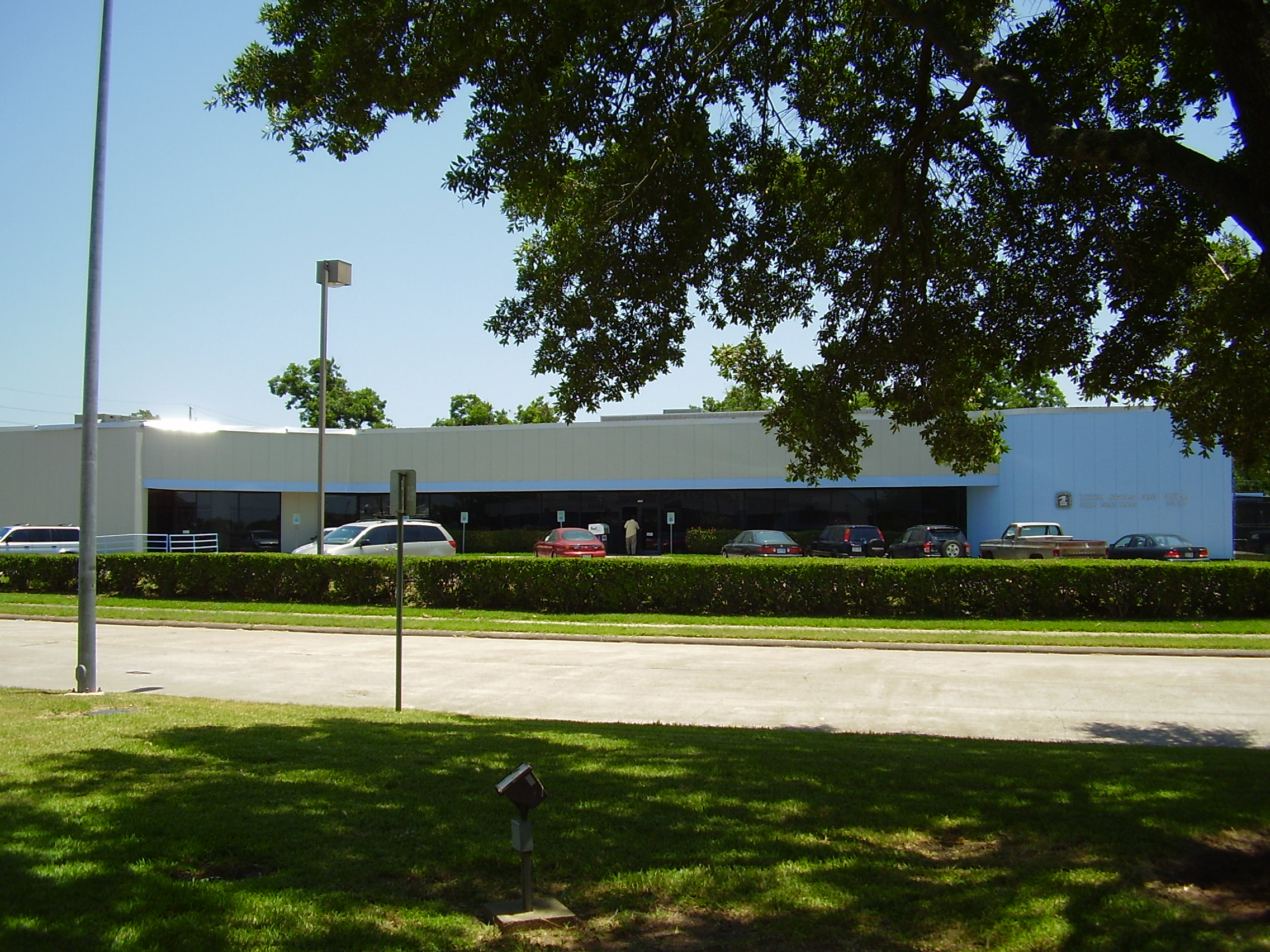
Sugar Land Post Office

The United States Postal Service operates the Sugar Land Post Office at 225 Matlage Way and the First Colony Post Office at 3130 Grants Lake Boulevard.

=== Animal services ===
The city has its own municipal animal shelter. In 2026 it announced plans to build a new shelter with $20,000,000.

== Culture and sports ==
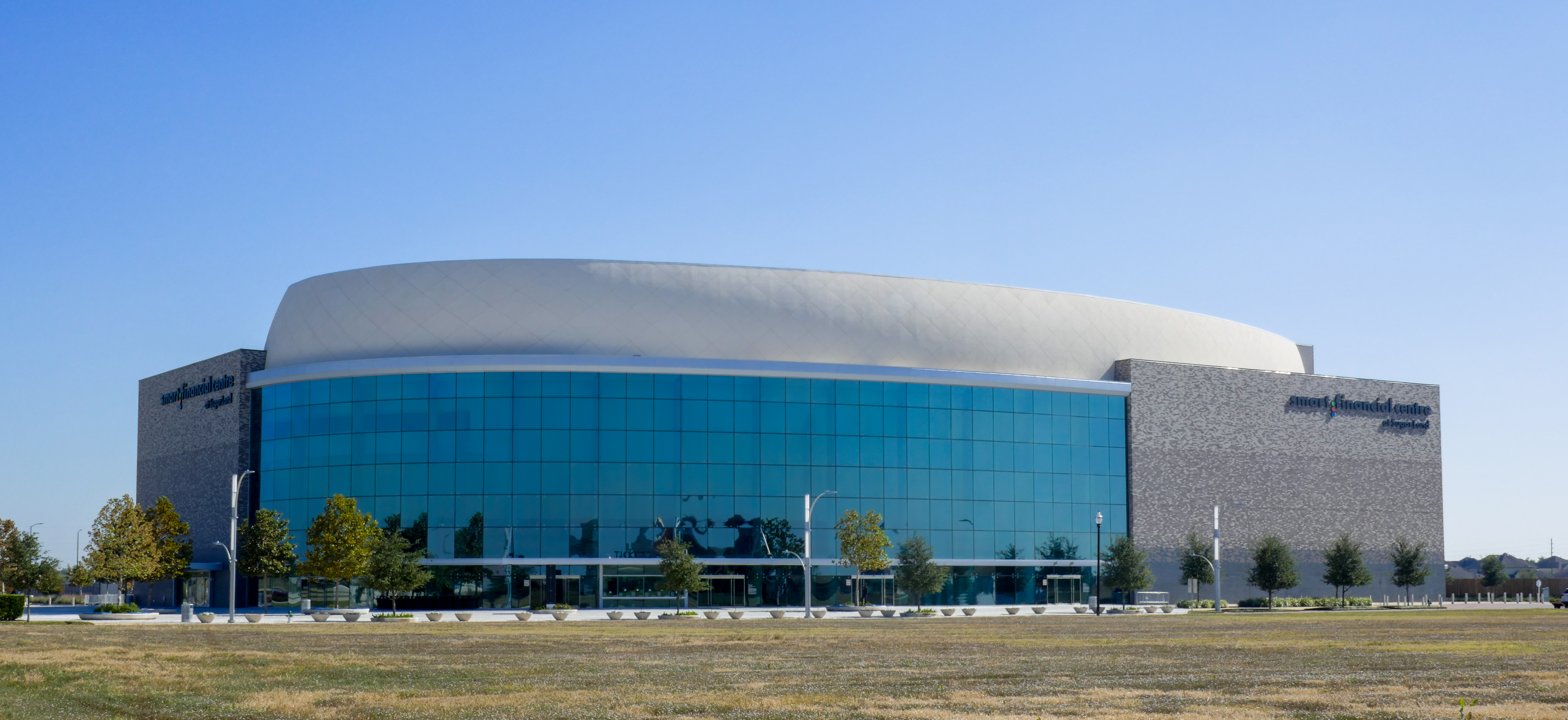
The Smart Financial Centre in Sugar Land

Sugar Land has a largely white-collar, university-educated workforce employed in Houston's energy industry.

In 2004, the city was named one of the top 100 places to live, according to HomeRoute, a national real estate marketing company which identifies top American cities each year through its Relocate-America program. Cities are selected based on educational opportunities, crime rates, employment and housing data. The magazine started with statistics on 271 U.S. cities provided by OnBoard LLC, a real estate information company.

Sugar Land was awarded the title of "Fittest City in Texas" for the population range 50,000–100,000 in 2004, 2005 (in a tie with Round Rock) and 2006. The "Fittest City in Texas" program is a part of the Texas Roundup program, a statewide fitness initiative.

Local sports are popular both at the recreational and competitive levels. Sugar Land formed its first community swim team, the Sugar Land Sharks, in 1967, and it is still competing as of 2016.

Sugar Land is home to the Smart Financial Centre, an indoor concert hall that is the only such venue of its kind in Greater Houston, and can seat 6,400 seats for multiple events including concerts, cultural events and graduations. An outdoor arts plaza is also being constructed around the concert hall, and will be incorporated with a new mixed-use development that will include two hotels, a conference center, office and ground-level retail, and an age-restricted senior living multifamily complex.

Sugar Land is the home of the Sugar Land Space Cowboys Minor League Baseball team, founded in 2012, who play at Constellation Field in the Imperial master-planned community, located between the Sugar Land Regional Airport and the former Imperial Sugar property. Originally known as the Sugar Land Skeeters, they won the 2016 and 2018 championship in the independent Atlantic League of Professional Baseball. In 2021, the Skeeters joined the Triple-A West as the Triple-A affiliate of the Houston Astros. After the 2021 season, the team rebranded as the Sugar Land Space Cowboys while its league rebranded to the Pacific Coast League.

In 2014 the Sugar Land Youth Cricket Club, a children's cricket club, was established. In 2016 it played its home games at Everest Academy in Stafford.

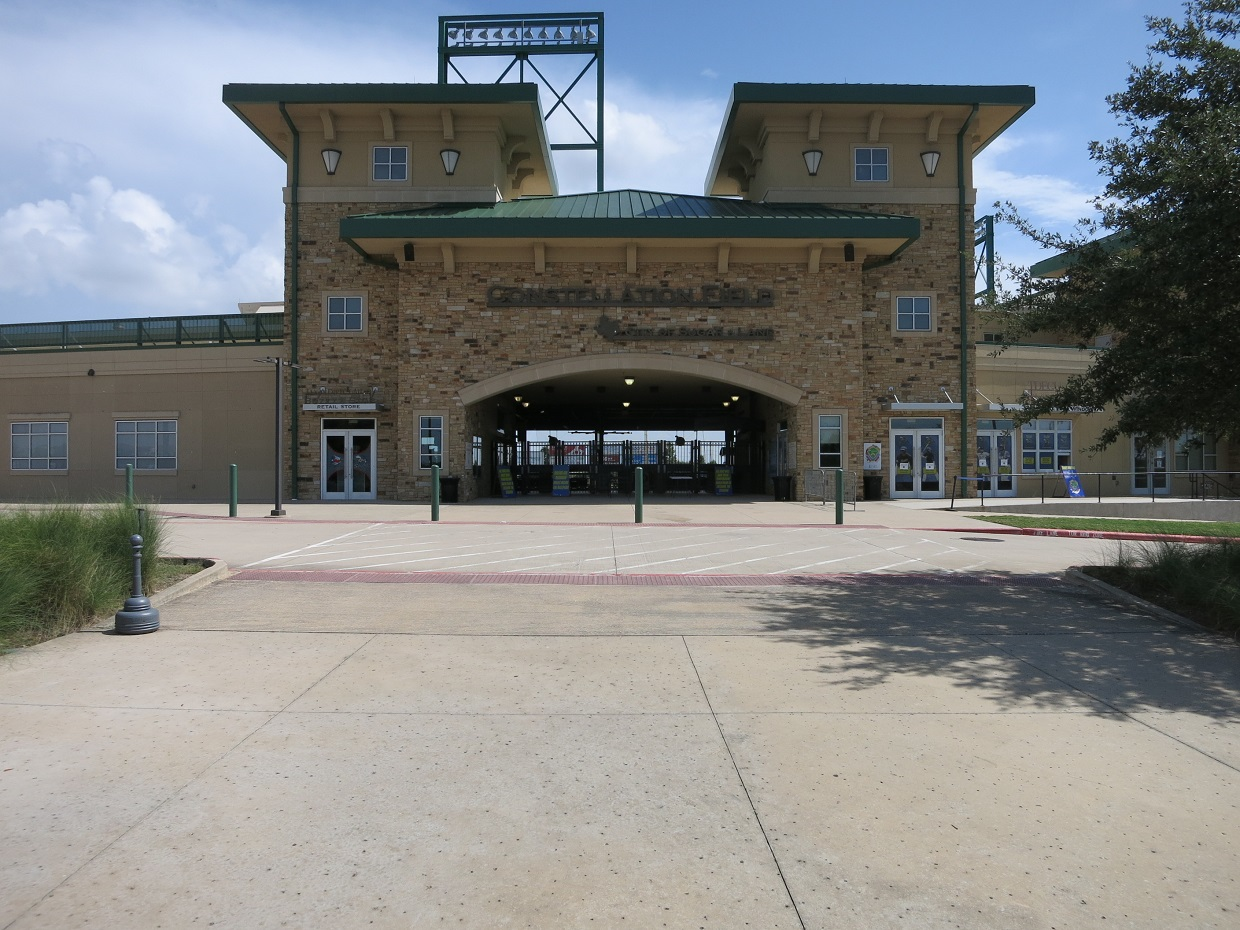
Constellation Field, home of Space Cowboys Minor League Baseball team

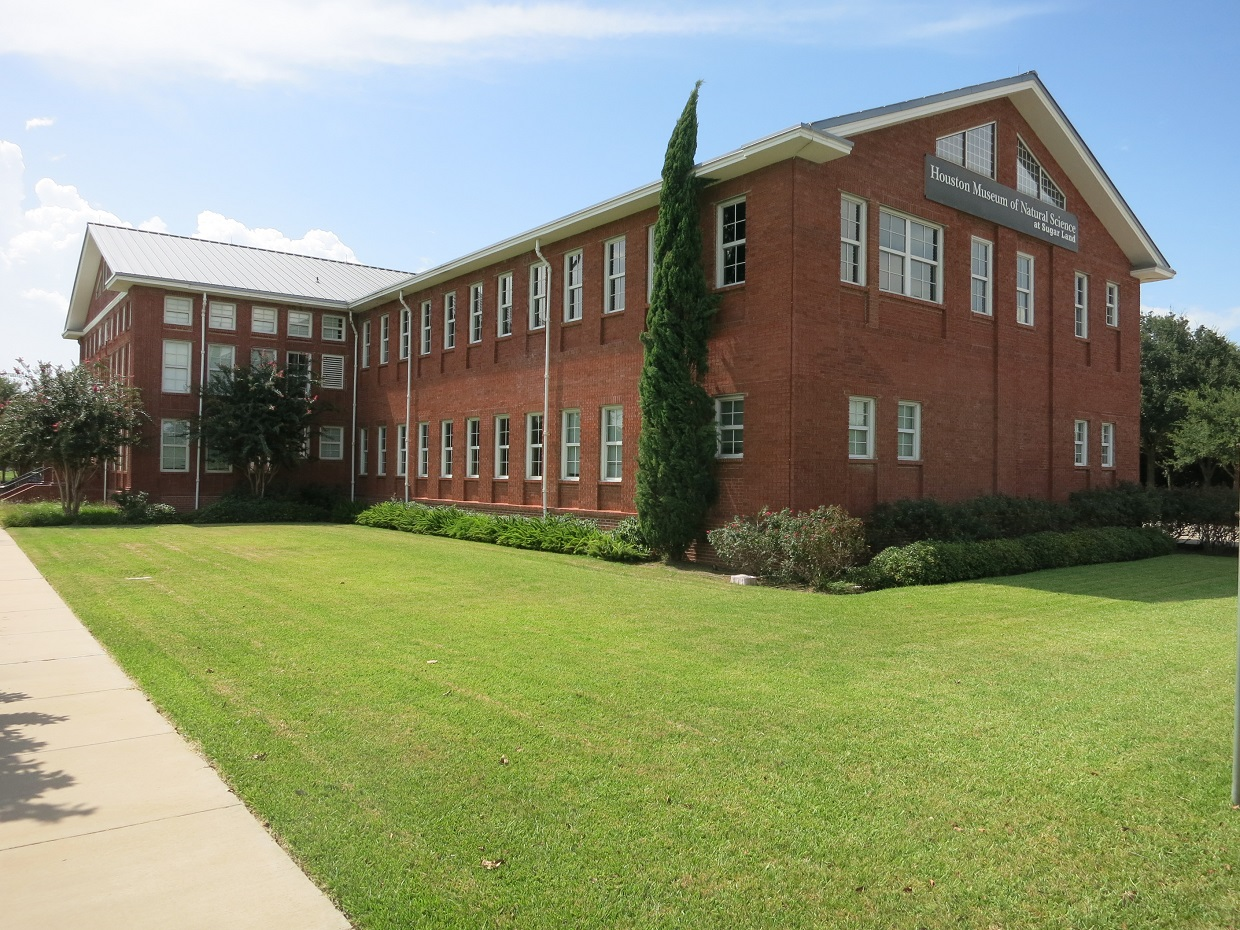
Houston Natural Science Museum at Sugar Land

== Local attractions ==
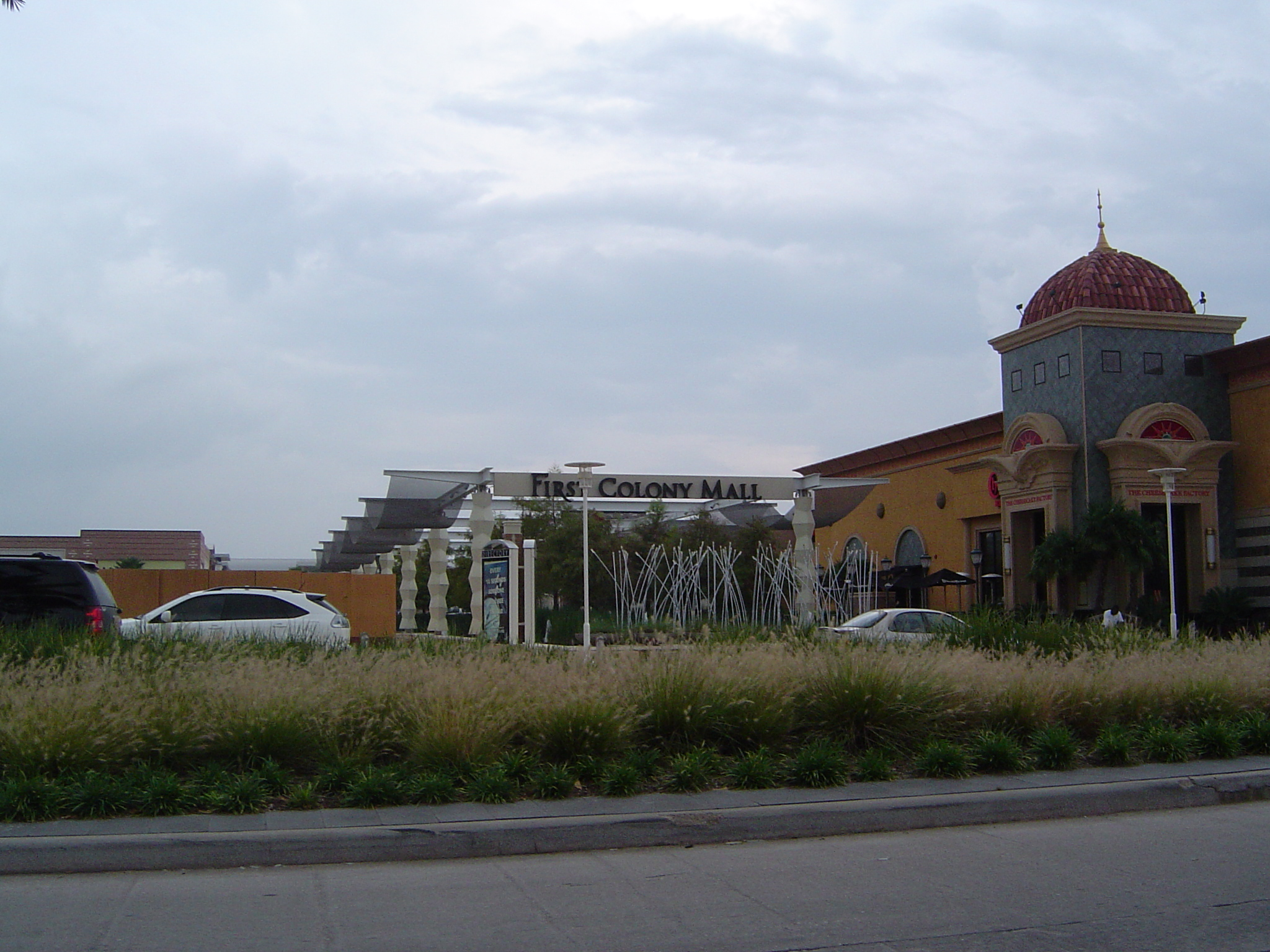
First Colony Mall

Sugar Land Town Square serves as the primary entertainment district in Sugar Land and Fort Bend County. It offers an array of restaurants, sidewalk cafes, shopping venues, a Marriott Hotel and conference center, mid-rise offices and homes, a public plaza, and Sugar Land City Hall. Festivals and important events take place in the plaza. The new city hall and public plaza, a cornerstone of Sugar Land Town Square, received the "Best Community Impact" award from the Houston Business Journal at the fifth annual Landmark Awards ceremony.

Next door to the district is First Colony Mall, a major regional shopping mall that recently expanded from its original indoor design to include an outdoor lifestyle component, several parking garages, and new signage that blends in with the surrounding area.

Sugar Land also hosts the Sugar Land Ice and Sports Center (formerly Sugar Land Aerodrome), offers ice skating and hockey lessons. It is open to the public as an ice skating facility. Previously, it served as the practice facility for the Houston Aeros of the American Hockey League. Also Olympic medalist Tara Lipinski trained at the Sugar Land Ice and Sports Center.

In May 2016, two sculptures in the Town Square's public plaza were installed as part of a 10-piece collection donated by a Sugar Land resident to the city through the Sugar Land Legacy Foundation. One of the statues, which depicts two girls taking a selfie, has received criticism and acclaim from the media and general public.

Future developments in the city include new mixed-use developments on the grounds of the former Imperial Sugar refinery, Imperial Market, which will incorporate the property's 1920s-era char house as a boutique hotel, as well as in the southern part of the Telfair master-planned community with the Smart Financial Centre as an anchor.

== Education ==
=== Higher education ===
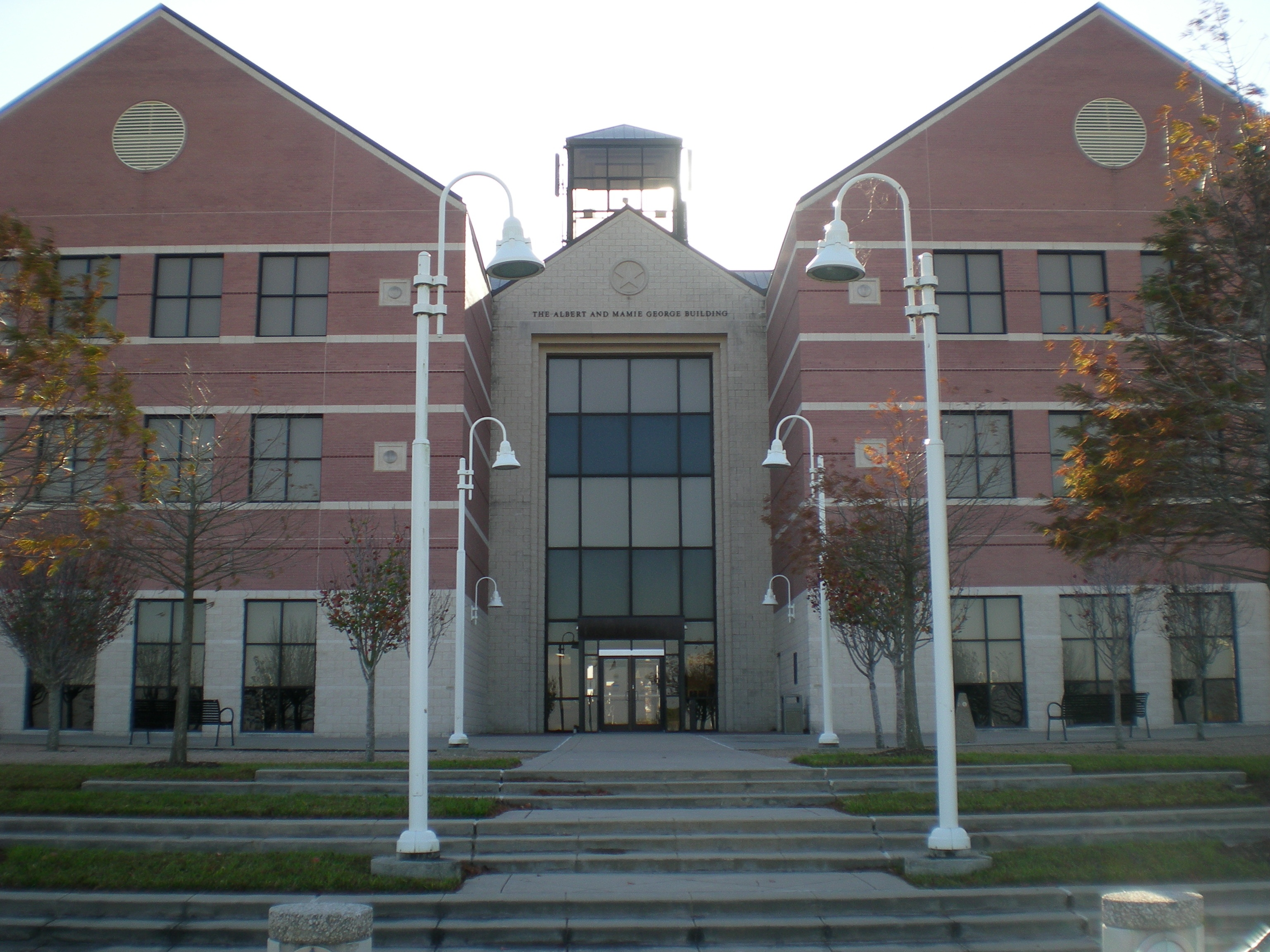
Albert and Mamie George Building on University of Houston Sugar Land campus

A branch campus of Wharton County Junior College and a branch campus of University of Houston are both located in Sugar Land.

Sugar Land is under state law in the service area of Wharton County Junior College, as its extraterritorial jurisdiction. Wharton County College is a comprehensive community college offering a wide range of postsecondary educational programs and services including associate degrees, certificates, and continuing-education courses. The college prepares students interested in transferring to baccalaureate-granting institutions.

=== Primary and secondary education ===
==== Public schools ====
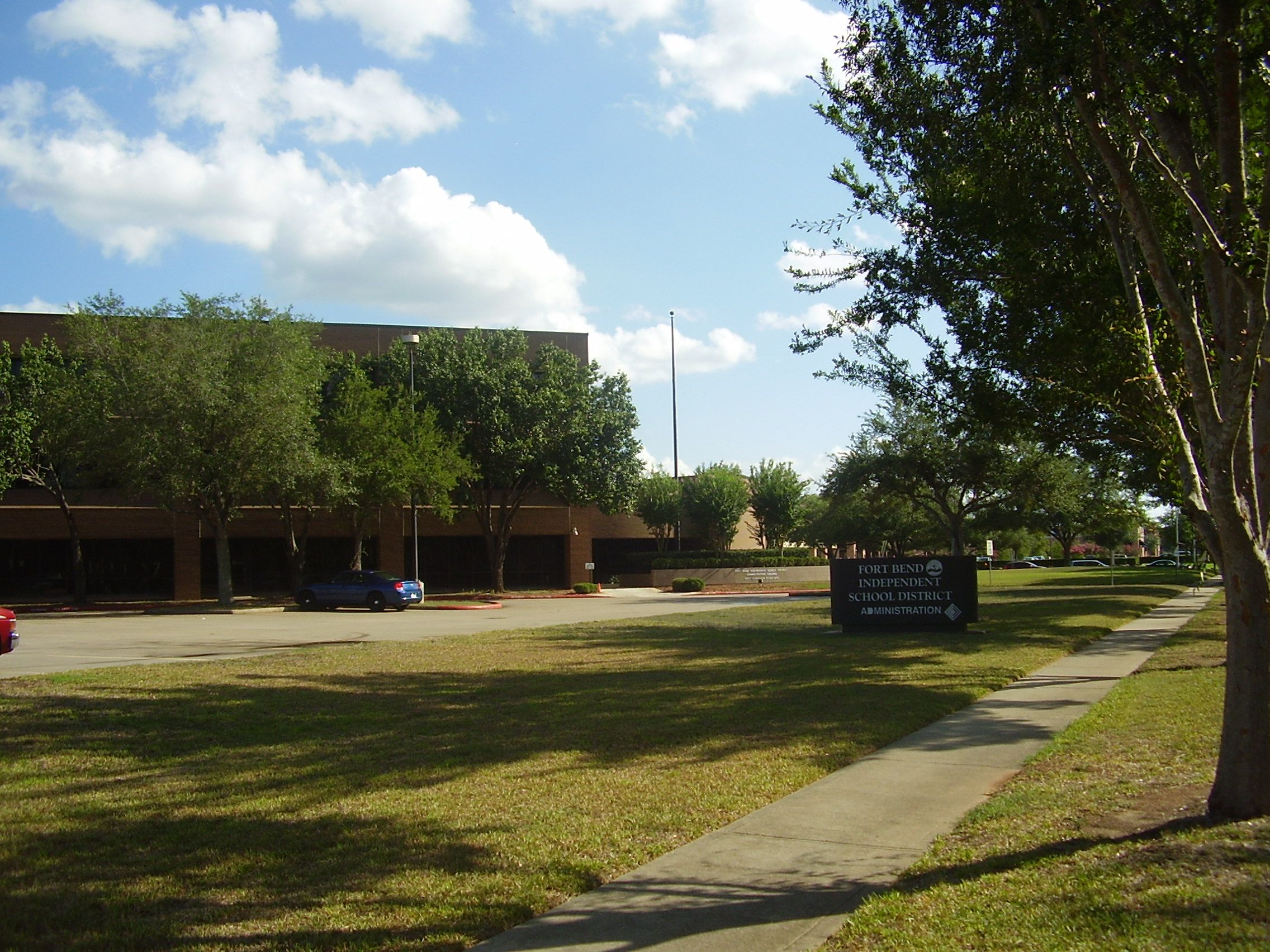
Fort Bend Independent School District administration building

All public school systems in Texas are administered by the Texas Education Agency (TEA). The Fort Bend Independent School District (FBISD) is the school district that serves almost all of the city of Sugar Land; it formed in 1959 by the consolidation of Missouri City Independent School District and the Sugar Land Independent School District. The southwest portion of Sugar Land and some very small areas within its extraterritorial jurisdiction (ETJ) are in the Lamar Consolidated Independent School District (LCISD).

High schools serving Sugar Land residents in Fort Bend ISD include Clements High School, Dulles High School and Kempner High School, as well as Austin High School and Travis High School north of the city, which both serve students in New Territory, while Lamar Consolidated ISD's Lamar Consolidated High School and George Ranch High School, respectively, serve the River Park and Greatwood master-planned communities in Sugar Land.

Dulles, Clements, and Austin have been recognized by Texas Monthly magazine in its list of the top high schools in Texas. Dulles, Clements, and Austin high schools were also ranked among the top 1000 schools in the United States by Newsweek's 2009 report.

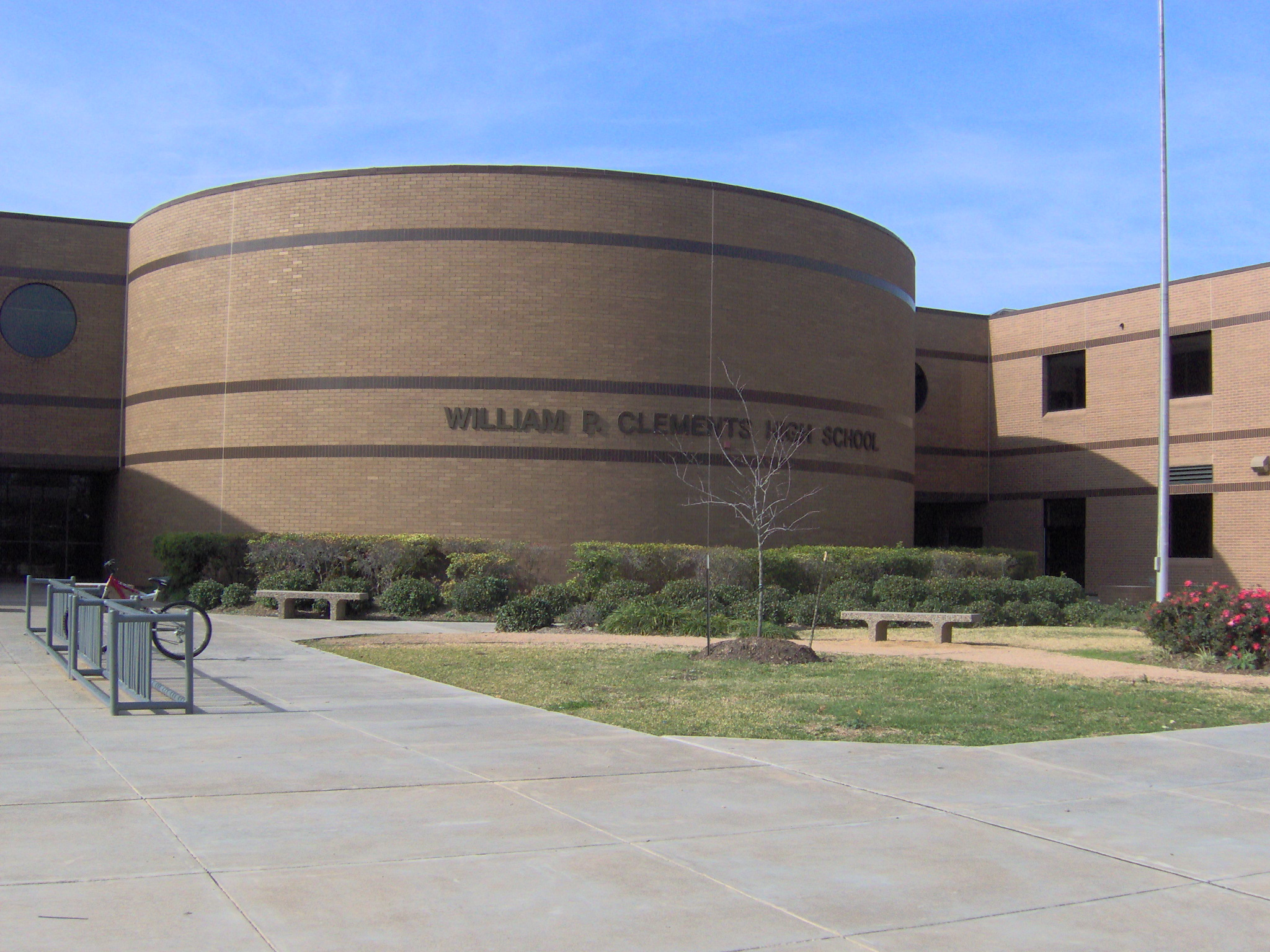
Clements High School

Prior to 1959, Sugar Land High School, which merged into Dulles that year, served the city. At the time FBISD formed, white students attended an elementary school in Sugar Land, a junior high school in Sugar Land, and a high school site in Missouri City. The elementary and junior high campus now houses Lakeview Elementary School and the high school site now houses Missouri City Middle School. Dulles High School became the zoned high school for white students in FBISD. Black students in Sugar Land for grades 1–12 were served by M.R. Wood School, one of FBISD's three schools for black children. Following racial desegregation in 1965, Dulles became the only zoned high school for students of all races in FBISD until Willowridge High School opened in 1979.

In addition, the Harmony Public Schools operates three charter schools in the city, the grades K–5 Harmony Science Academy, 6–8 Harmony School of Excellence, and grades 9–12 Harmony School of Innovation.

==== Private schools ====
Private schools in Sugar Land and the surrounding area are of various types: nonreligious, nonsectarian, Catholic, and Protestant. The Texas Education Agency has no authority over private-school operations; private schools may or may not be accredited, and achievement tests are not required for private school graduating seniors.

The Roman Catholic Archdiocese of Galveston-Houston operates two Catholic K–8 schools in Sugar Land: St. Theresa Catholic School and St. Laurence School, both named for two of the city's Catholic parishes. St. Laurence, established in 1992, received additions in 1996 and 2002. St. Theresa was established in 2008. The city government approved the permit for the St. Theresa school building in 2007, and it was dedicated on August 13, 2009. Some high school students attend Pope John XXIII High School in Greater Katy.

The Fort Bend Christian Academy, formerly known as Fort Bend Baptist Academy, is in Sugar Land. Logos Preparatory Academy is also located in Sugar Land. The Honor Roll School has grades PK-8. The Darul Arqam Schools Southwest Campus is located in Alief, Houston, with a Sugar Land postal address.

As of 2019, the Village School in the Energy Corridor area; the British International School of Houston in Greater Katy; and Awty International School in Spring Branch, which includes the Houston area's French international school, have bus service to Sugar Land.

=== Public libraries ===
Residents of Sugar Land are served by the Fort Bend County Libraries system, which has 11 libraries. Three branches are within the city: Sugar Land Branch, First Colony Branch, and University Branch on the University of Houston Sugar Land branch campus.

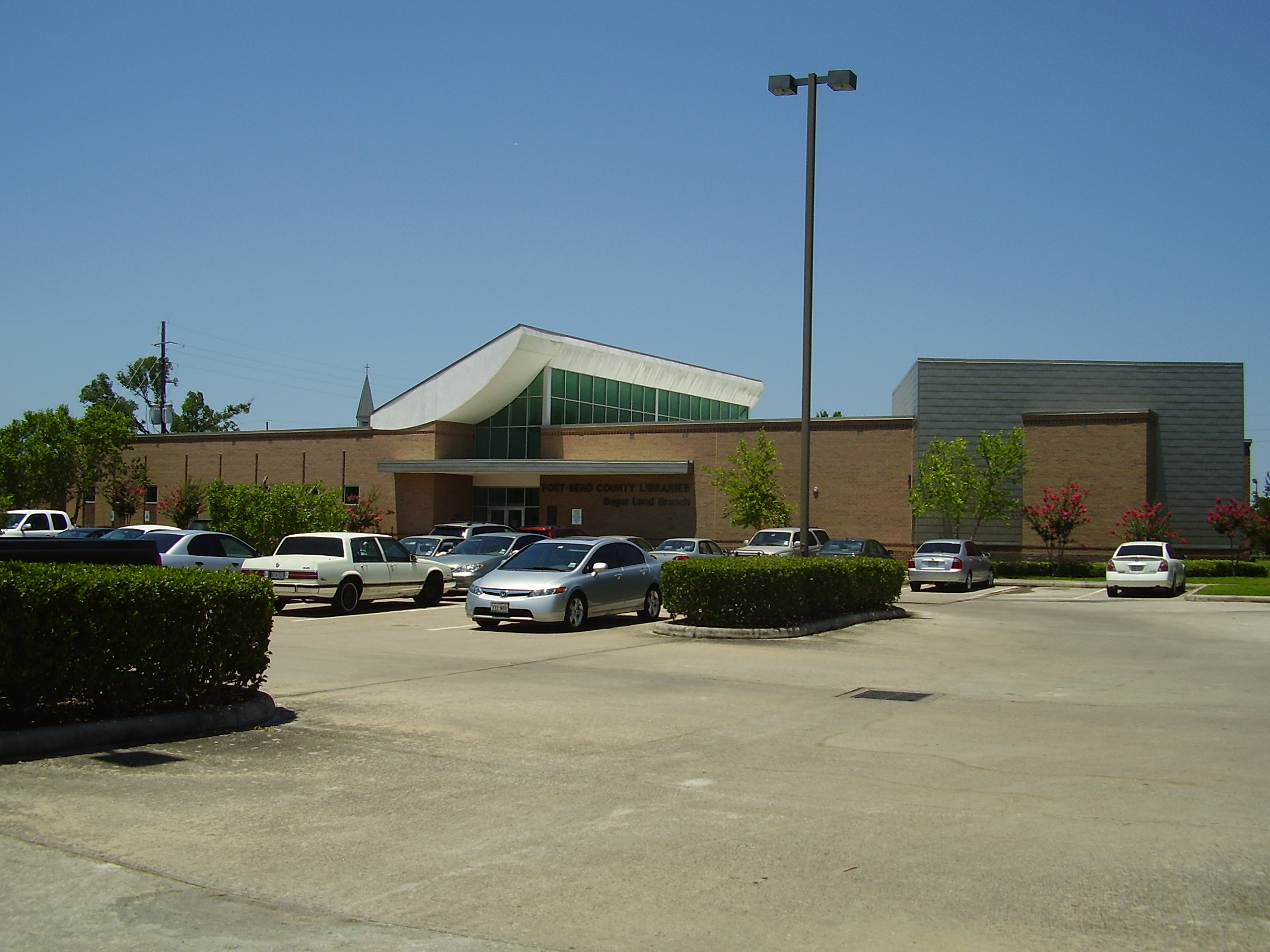
Sugar Land Library branch

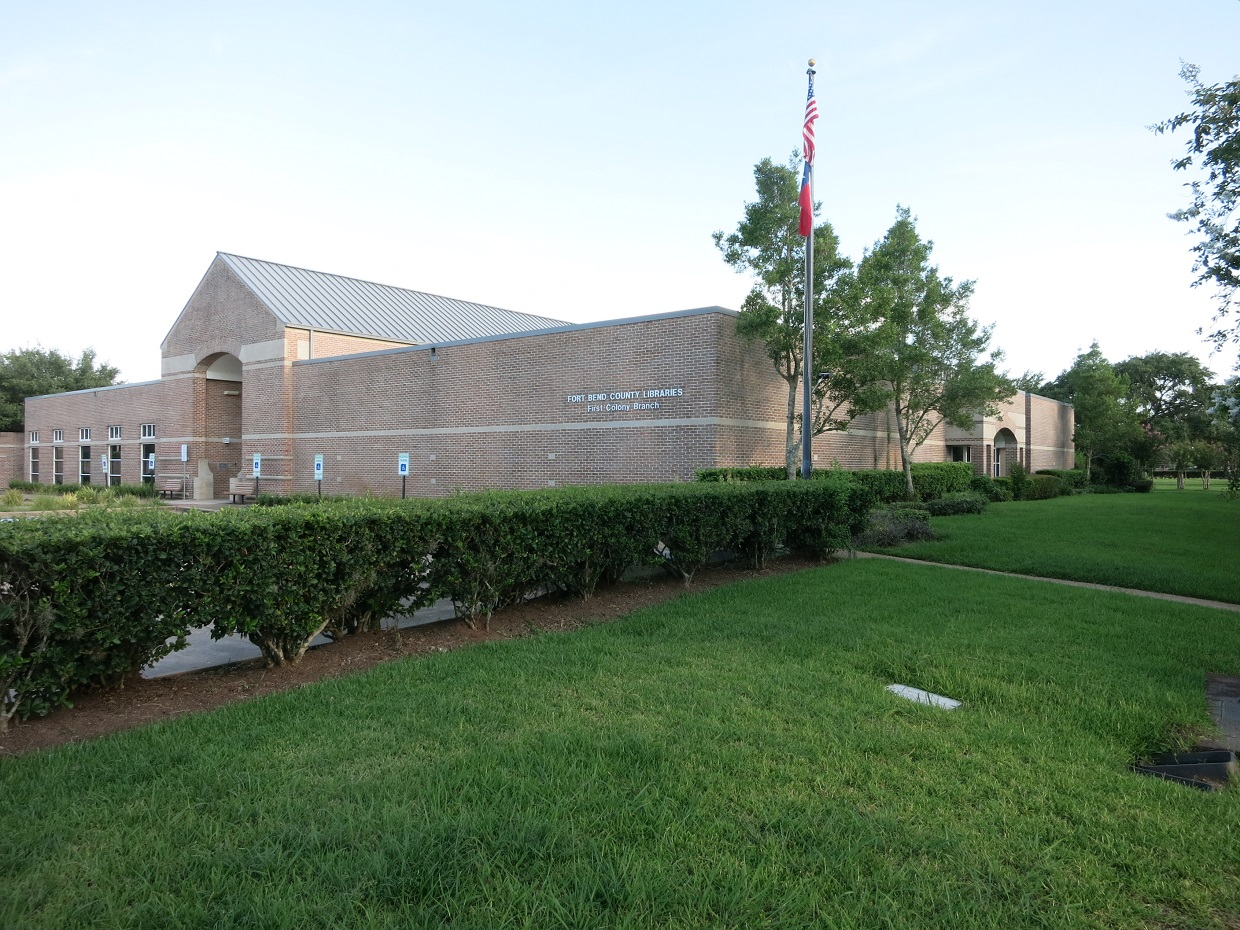
First Colony Library branch

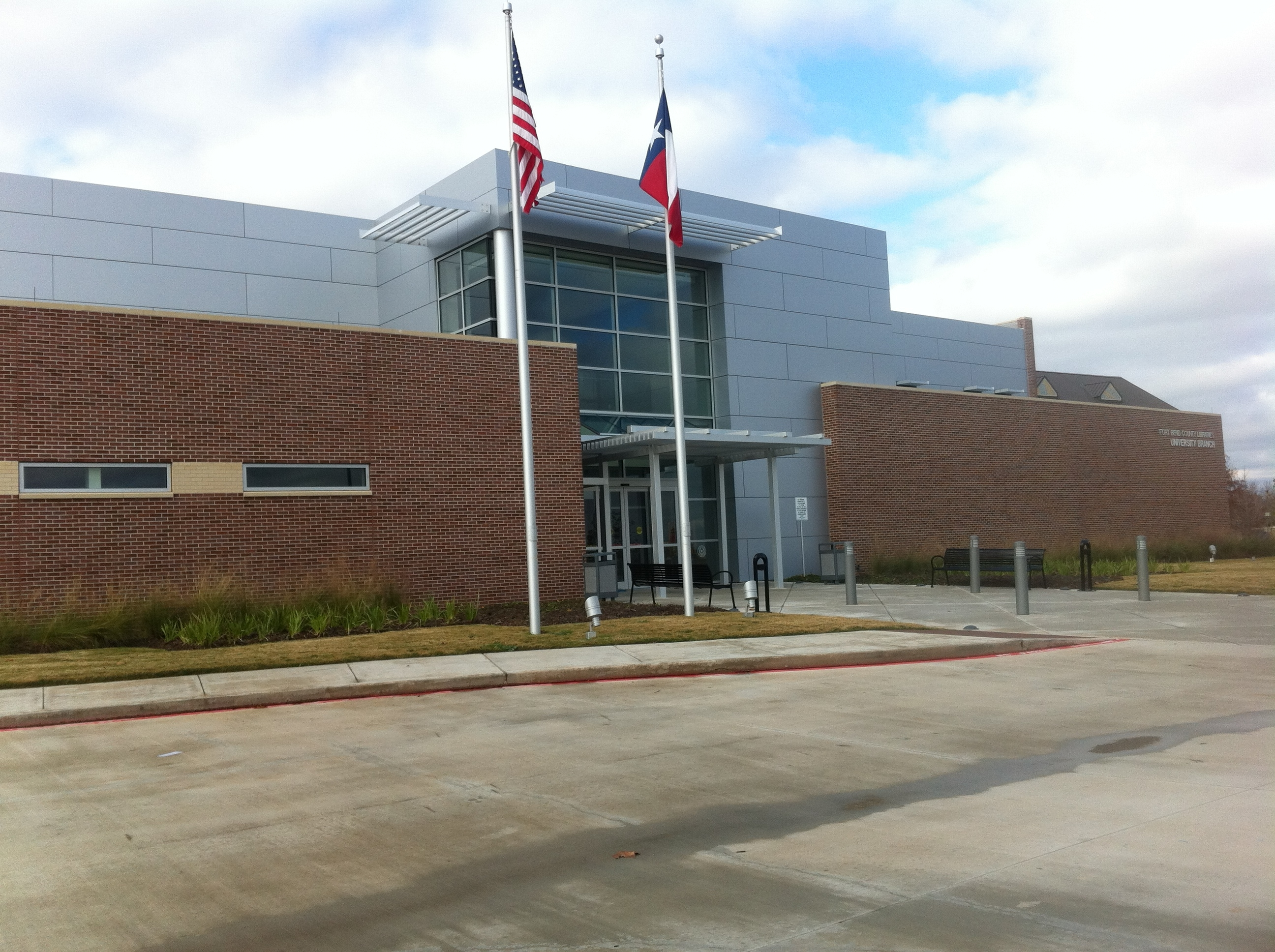
University Library branch

== Media ==
=== Movie and television references ===
A portion of the 1974 movie The Sugarland Express takes place in Sugar Land. Many of the movie's earliest scenes were filmed at the nearby Beauford H. Jester prison pre-release center. Other parts of the set were filmed in and around Sugar Land. The movie's title parses the name of the city as one word rather than two. It was among Steven Spielberg's first films before he became famous. The film was the first theatrical feature film directed by Spielberg.

In 2010, The Legend of Action Man was filmed in Sugar Land. The film was produced by Dingoman Productions, a sketch comedy group formed by Sugar Land residents Andy Young, Derek Papa and James McEnelly, who attended Austin High School together. The story takes place in the Sugar Land area and makes use of many of the landmarks there. Action Man is famous for being one of the least expensive films ever made, made on a budget of $200. Director Andy Young wrote about the experience for Moviemaker magazine.

Sugar Land is a setting in the Lifetime series The Client List, starring Jennifer Love Hewitt. Hewitt's character lives in Beaumont, but commutes to Sugar Land to work at a scandalous massage parlor.

Sugar Land is mentioned in the ABC police procedural television series The Rookie. The character Miles Penn, portrayed by Deric Augustine, is said to have worked as a police officer in Sugar Land for two years before transferring to the Los Angeles Police Department, being introduced in the 7th season.

=== Music references ===
Folk musician Lead Belly's song "Midnight Special" discusses his arrest in Houston and his stay at the Sugar Land Prison (now the Beauford H. Jester pre-release center) in 1925.

If you're ever down in Houston,
Boy, you better walk right.
And you better not squabble.
And you better not fight.
Bason and Brock will arrest you.
Payton and Boone will take you down.
You can bet your bottom dollar,
That you're Sugar Land bound.

Country music band Sugarland gets its name from the city. They reference it in their song "Sugarland".

Bruce Springsteen recorded but did not release a song called "Sugar Land", about the economic crisis facing American agriculture in the 1980s.

=== Newspapers and magazines ===
The primary newspaper serving Sugar Land residents is the Houston Chronicle, which is the only major newspaper in the Greater Houston region. On Thursdays, the Houston Chronicle offers a localized segment covering the Sugar Land area under its "Fort Bend" section. An alternative newspaper, the Houston Press, is also offered in this area.

Additionally, Sugar Land residents receive local area news coverage via Covering Fort Bend, which covers local news and political happenings in the Sugar Land area. Residents also are served by three free weekly newspapers, the Fort Bend Independent, the Fort Bend Star, and the Sugar Land Sun. The Fort Bend Herald and Texas Coaster, a daily newspaper covering primarily the Richmond-Rosenberg area west of Sugar Land, also covers news stories in Sugar Land.

=== Television ===
Over-the-air television in Sugar Land is broadcast in the Houston television market, which is the seventh-largest market in the United States according to Nielsen Media Research.

The city is also served by a citywide public-access television on cable channel 16, which covers city council meetings, planning and zoning meetings, community events, FBISD board meetings, and Fort Bend County Commissioners' Court meetings.

The vast majority of cable subscribers in the Sugar Land area are served by Comcast-owned Xfinity, which took over the Houston area's dominant cable franchise from Time Warner in 2007. Other cable options in Sugar Land include AT&T U-verse, En-Touch Systems (which covers the River Park West and Telfair areas of the city), Phonoscope, TVMAX, and Ygnition (the latter two of which cover cable subscribers in multifamily housing developments).

== Transportation ==
It has been a possible candidate for expansion of Houston's METRORail system by means of a planned commuter rail along U.S. Highway 90A. The city is not a participant in the Houston area's METRO transit authority. Fort Bend County Public Transit provides commuter service from Sugar Land to Houston.

In the 2020s, Sugar Land started proposing numerous public transit options. On March 18, 2025, the city opened a public micro-transit service, known as Sugar Land On-Demand. This service is a city-sponsored ride-share program, with a flat rate of 2 dollars as base fare.

=== Major thoroughfares ===
Interstate 69/U.S. Highway 59, the major freeway running diagonally through the city, has undergone a major widening project in recent years to accommodate the region's daily commuters. The finished portion of the freeway from east of State Highway 6 to just west of State Highway 99 currently has eight main lanes, with two diamond lanes and six continuous frontage road lanes. The freeway is currently undergoing a major expansion west of the city to accommodate growth in the nearby Richmond/Rosenberg area and western Fort Bend County, as well as upgrading it to federal highway standards to reflect its newfound status as an interstate highway.

U.S. Highway 90 Alternate is another major highway running through Sugar Land from west to east and traverses a historic area of the city, known as "Old Sugar Land". Originally the main highway in Sugar Land prior to the construction of what is now Interstate 69, U.S. Highway 90A is currently widened to an eight-lane highway with a 30-foot (9.1 m) median between State Highway 6 and Interstate 69/U.S. Highway 59.

State Highway 6 is a major highway running from north to southeast Sugar Land and traverses through the 10,000 acres (40 km^{2}) master-planned community of First Colony. There is a freeway section that opened in 2008 from just west of Brooks Street/First Colony Blvd all the way to 3/4 miles north of U.S. Highway 90A.

A segment of State Highway 99/Grand Parkway currently traverses the New Territory and River Park master-planned communities. The original highway opened in 1994, with toll lanes added in 2014. Construction will start soon south of its current terminus at Interstate 69/US 59, which is expected to extend the highway east to Alvin in Brazoria County.

Texas F.M. 1876, widely known as Copenhaver Road, is a north-south state highway in north Sugar Land. It traverses through many established areas and acts as the western border of the Sugar Land Business Park.

=== Airport ===
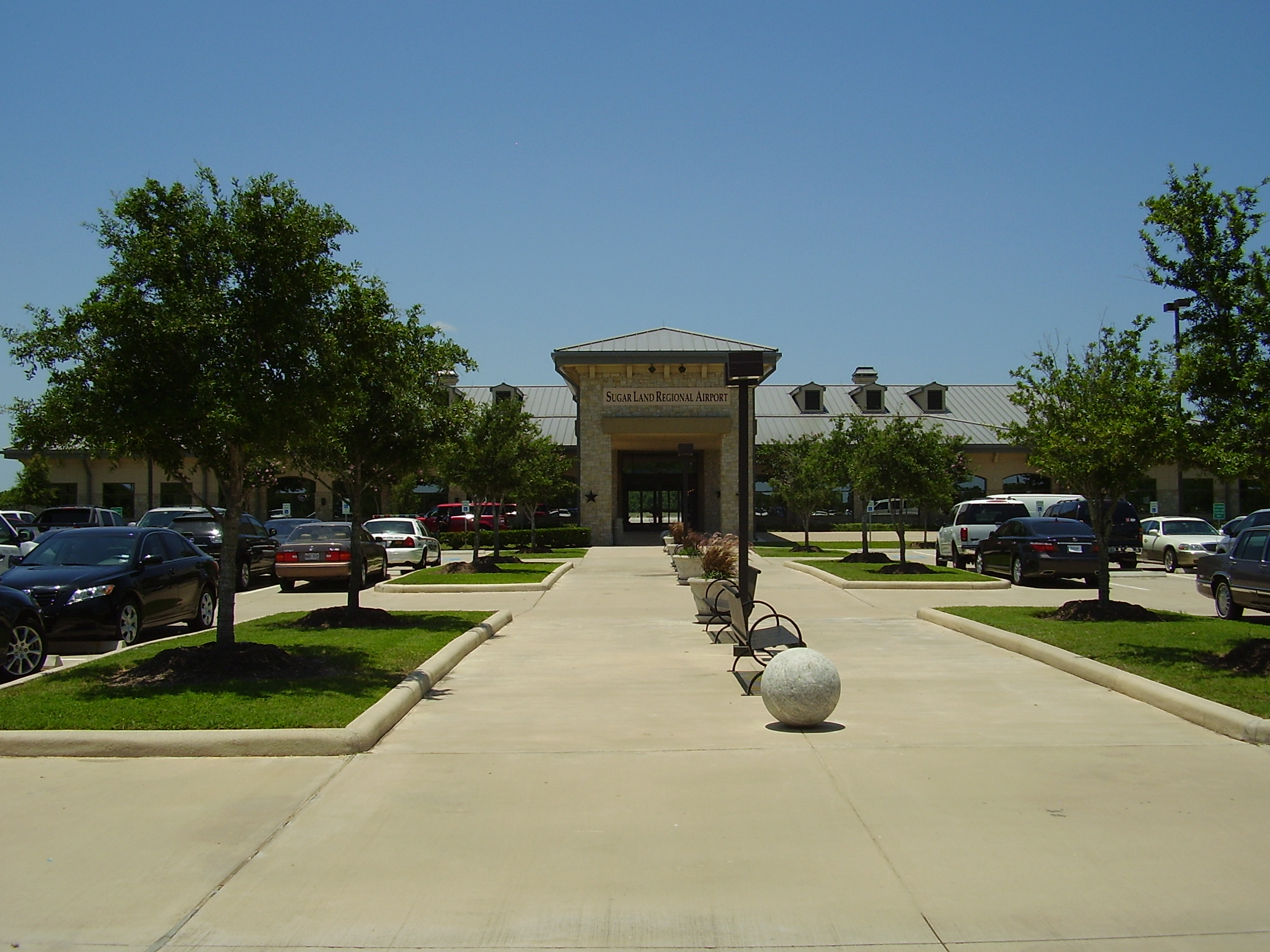
Sugar Land Regional Airport

Sugar Land Regional Airport (formerly Hull Field, later Sugar Land Municipal Airport) was purchased from a private interest in 1990 by the city of Sugar Land. It is the fourth largest airport within the Greater Houston metropolitan area. The airport handles approximately 250 aircraft operations per day. The airport has an on-field United States Customs office, making this airport attractive to energy companies based in the Houston metropolitan area as this allows flights directly to and from countries wherein overseas operations are located, allowing fliers to avoid the delays inherent in high traffic airports such as George Bush Intercontinental.

The airport today serves the area's general aviation (GA) aircraft serving corporate, governmental, and private clientele. A new 20,000-square-foot (1,900 m^{2}) terminal and a 60-acre (24 ha) GA complex opened in 2006. Sugar Land Regional briefly handled commercial passenger service during the mid-1990s via a now-defunct Texas carrier known as Conquest Airlines. For scheduled commercial service, Sugar Landers rely on Houston's two commercial airports, George Bush Intercontinental Airport (IAH), 40 miles (64 km) northeast, and William P. Hobby Airport (HOU), 27 miles (43 km) east.

The city of Houston maintains a park that occupies 750 acres (300 ha) of land directly north of the Sugar Land Regional Airport, and developers have built master-planned communities (Telfair, and the future development of TX DOT Tract 3 immediately east of the airport) around the airport, both factors that block airport expansion.

China Airlines operated private bus shuttle services from Wel-Farm Super Market/Metro Bank on State Highway 6 in Sugar Land to George Bush Intercontinental Airport to feed the flight from Bush Intercontinental to Taipei, Taiwan. The service ended when China Airlines pulled out of Houston on January 29, 2008.

== Notable people ==
- Katie Armiger, country singer
- Kevin Bass, former outfielder for the Houston Astros and the San Francisco Giants
- Derek Carr, NFL quarterback
- Nicholas Alexander Chavez, actor, spent part of his early childhood in Sugar Land
- Tom DeLay, former United States representative and House majority leader
- Ed Fiori, professional golfer
- Sean Patrick Flanery, actor
- Maddie Font, member of country duo Maddie & Tae
- Derrick Frazier, NFL cornerback
- Stuart Holden, soccer player
- Jerry Hughes, defensive end for the Buffalo Bills
- George Iloka, NFL player
- Brittney Karbowski, voice actor
- Keshi, singer, grew up in Sugar Land
- Tara Lipinski, Olympic gold medalist in figure skating
- Diana López, taekwondo athlete
- Mark López, taekwondo athlete
- Steven López, taekwondo athlete
- Simone Manuel, Olympic gold medalist in swimming
- Pete Olson, United States representative
- Rosé, drag queen, RuPaul's Drag Race Season 13 finalist
- Ashley Spillers, actress, grew up in Sugar Land
- Allison Tolman, Emmy-nominated actress
- Ryan Trahan, YouTuber
- Simeon Woods Richardson, MLB pitcher
