= Greatwood, Sugar Land, Texas =

Greatwood, Texas
- Neighborhood of Sugar Land, Texas; Former Census-designated place

- Location within the state of Texas Greatwood (the United States)
- Coordinates: 29°33′14″N 95°40′31″W
- Country: United States
- State: Texas
- County: Fort Bend

Area
  - Total: 2.75 sq mi (7.11 km^{2})
  - Land: 2.69 sq mi (6.97 km^{2})
  - Water: 0.054 sq mi (0.14 km^{2})
- Elevation: 69 ft (21 m)

Population (2010)
  - Total: 11,538
  - Density: 4,285/sq mi (1,654.4/km^{2})
- Time zone: UTC-6 (Central (CST))
  - Summer (DST): UTC-5 (CDT)
- FIPS code: 48-30806
- GNIS feature ID: 1852709

Greatwood is a neighborhood within the city of Sugar Land in the state of Texas, United States. It was formerly a census-designated place located in Fort Bend County. The population was 11,538 at the 2010 census, up from 6,640 at the 2000 census. It was annexed into the City of Sugar Land on December 12, 2017.

== History ==
American General started development of Greatwood in 1989. Newland Communities later took control of the rebuilding. By 2008, Greatwood was built-out.

In November 2016, the Sugar Land city council voted in favor of the city annexing Greatwood and New Territory by the end of 2017. The annexation was effective December 12, 2017.

== Geography ==
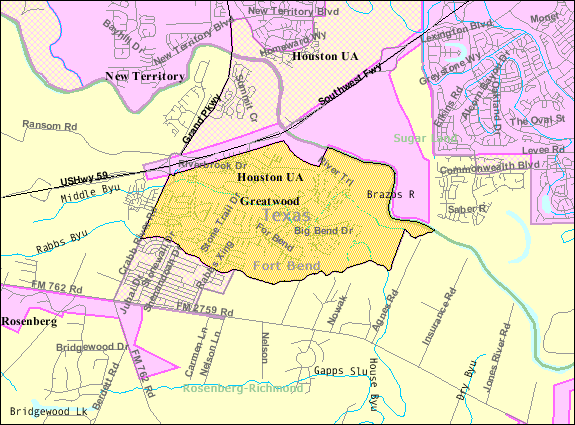
Map of the Greatwood census-designated place, pre-annexation

Greatwood is located in eastern Fort Bend County at 29°33′14″N 95°40′31″W (29.553813, -95.675319). It is bounded on the north by Interstate 69/U.S. Route 59, on the west by Crabb River Road, and on the north by the city of Sugar Land. The community is south of the Brazos River. The southern edge of the CDP runs generally along Rabbs Bayou, though parts of the sections known as Greatwood Knoll and Greatwood Crossing lie south of Rabbs Bayou. Four homes along Macek Road are on the north side of the bayou across a private bridge and are not part of the master-planned community. North of Rabbs Bayou, a watercourse known as Middle Bayou runs from west to east through Greatwood to the Brazos River. Both Rabbs and Middle Bayous are channelized.

According to the United States Census Bureau, the CDP has a total area of 2.7 square miles (7.1 km^{2}), of which 2.7 square miles (7.0 km^{2}) is land and 0.04 square miles (0.1 km^{2}), or 1.93%, is water.

Greatwood is southwest of the city of Sugar Land. The Telfair community of Sugar Land is about 2 miles (3 km) northeast of Greatwood.

Greatwood has 4,167 houses in 29 neighborhoods.

== Demographics ==
As of the census of 2000, there were 6,640 people, 2,250 households, and 2,034 families residing in the CDP. The population density was 1,705.6 inhabitants per square mile (658.5/km^{2}). There were 2,338 housing units at an average density of 600.6 per square mile (231.9/km^{2}). The racial makeup of the CDP was 84.29% White, 4.74% African American, 0.14% Native American, 7.50% Asian, 0.06% Pacific Islander, 1.37% from other races, and 1.90% from two or more races. Hispanic or Latino of any race were 5.57% of the population.

There were 2,250 households, out of which 50.9% had children under the age of 18 living with them, 86.1% were married couples living together, 2.6% had a female householder with no husband present, and 9.6% were non-families. 7.9% of all households were made up of individuals, and 1.1% had someone living alone who was 65 years of age or older. The average household size was 2.94 and the average family size was 3.10.

In the CDP, the population was spread out, with 30.8% under the age of 18, 2.2% from 18 to 24, 39.6% from 25 to 44, 22.9% from 45 to 64, and 4.4% who were 65 years of age or older. The median age was 35 years. For every 100 females, there were 98.7 males. For every 100 females age 18 and over, there were 99.3 males.

The median income for a household in the CDP was $107,917, and the median income for a family was $110,818. Males had a median income of $80,260 versus $49,471 for females. The per capita income for the CDP was $45,609. About 0.8% of families and 0.9% of the population were below the poverty line, including 0.9% of those under age 18 and none of those age 65 or over.

== Government and infrastructure ==
The City of Sugar Land Fire Station No. 6 provides fire services to the community. Homeowners in Greatwood paid for this service separately prior to the annexation. In the pre-annexation era Fort Bend County Sheriff's Office and the county constables provided police services to Greatwood.

Fort Bend County does not have a hospital district. OakBend Medical Center serves as the county's charity hospital which the county contracts with.

== Education ==
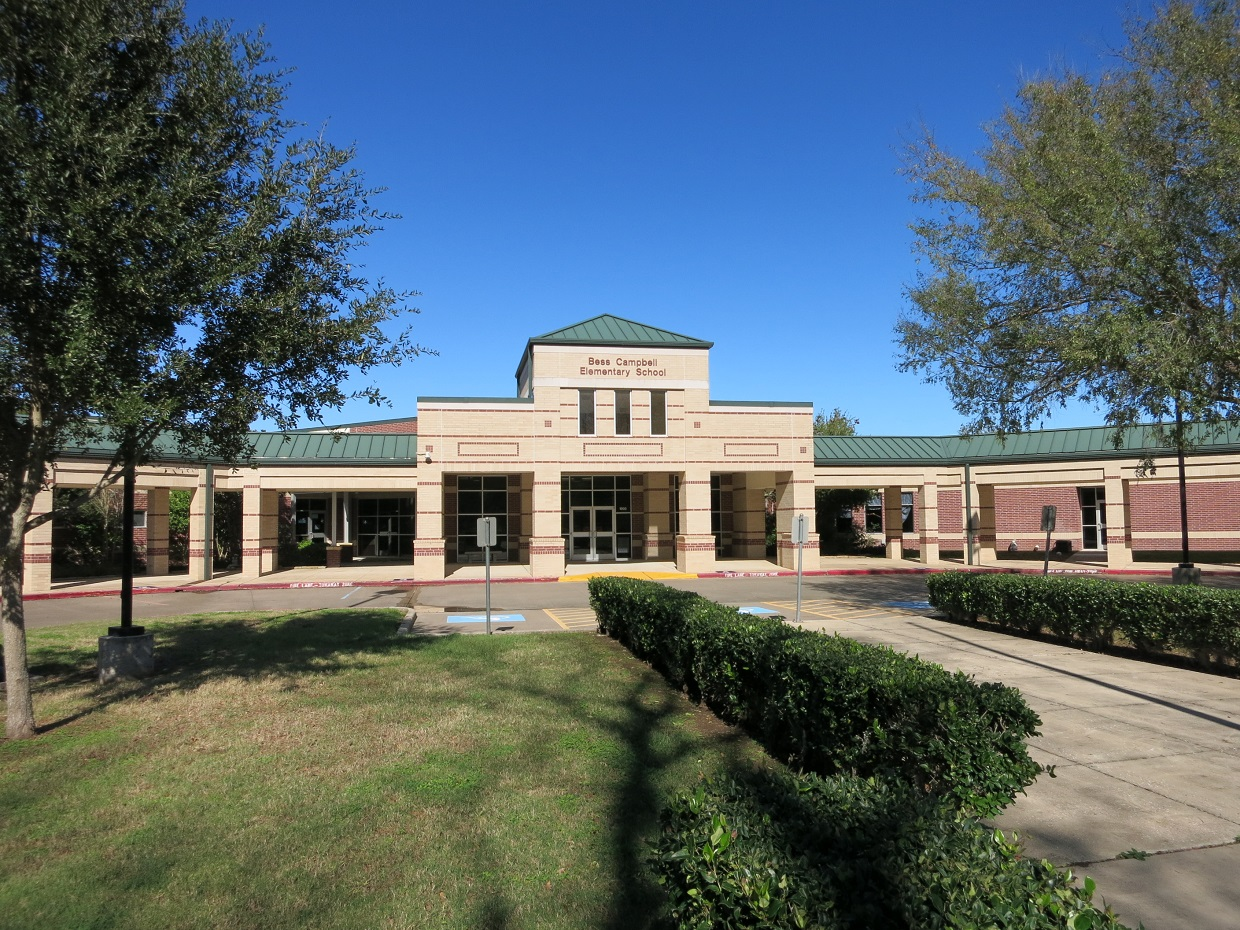
Bess Campbell Elementary School in Greatwood

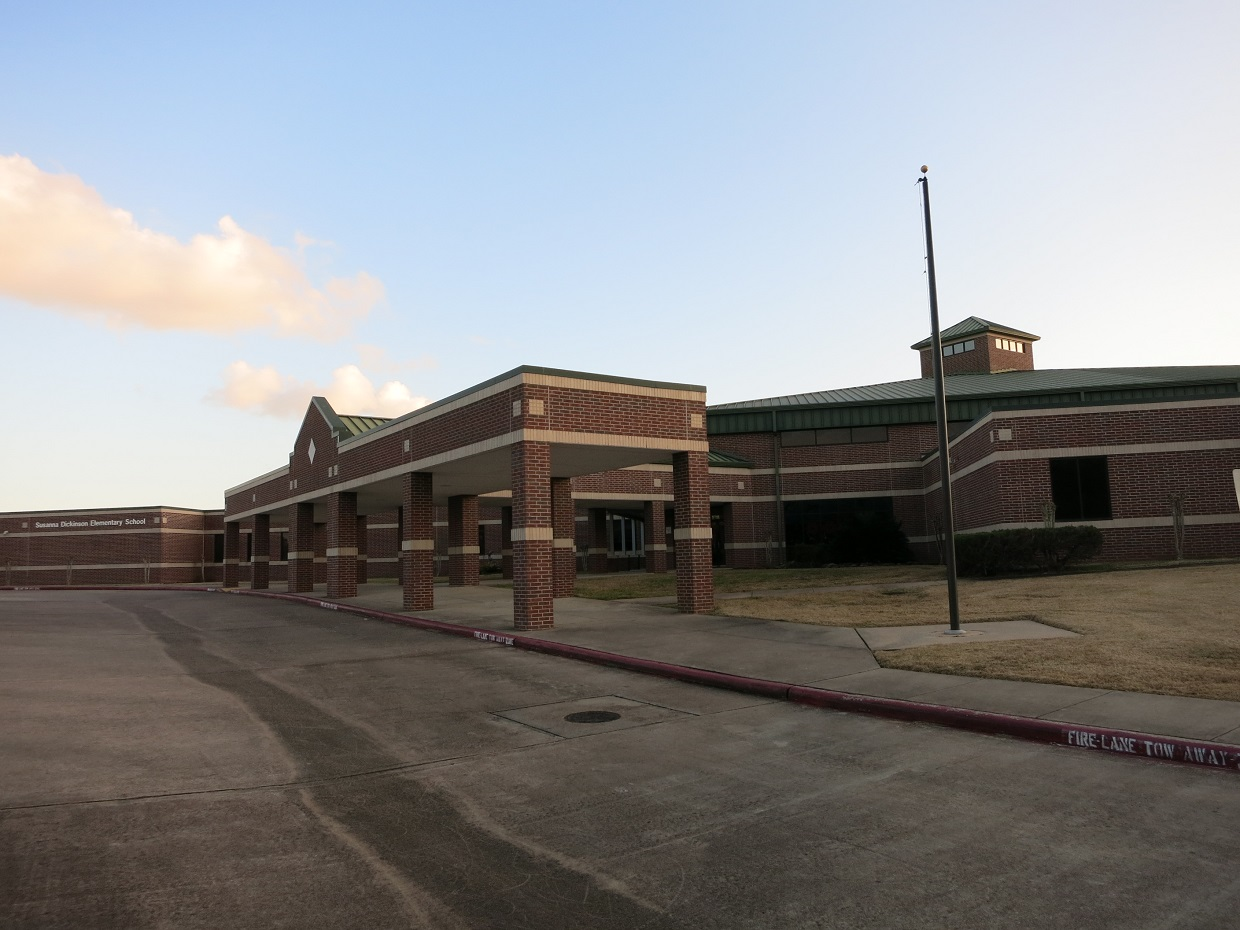
Susanna Dickinson Elementary School in Greatwood

Residents are zoned to the Lamar Consolidated Independent School District.

Zoned schools within Greatwood include:

- Bess Campbell Elementary School
- Susanna Dickinson Elementary School

The LCISD established a middle school and a high school south of Greatwood as part of a bond program designed to serve the community. They are Reading Junior High School and George Ranch High School. Reading JHS, and George Ranch HS are the respective zoned schools. Polly Ryon Middle School, a sixth grade-only school next to George Ranch, opened in 2013.

Prior to the opening of the George Ranch schools, Greatwood was zoned to Lamar Consolidated High School.

In 2009, LCISD proposed rezoning houses containing 366 students from Campbell Elementary students to Dickinson Elementary in order to relieve Campbell Elementary. This plan also called for rezoning some areas in the Canyon Gate at Brazos neighborhood, adjacent to Greatwood, from Dickinson to Williams Elementary School. Several residents of Canyon Gate protested the rezoning. Joshua Winata of the Houston Chronicle wrote that it resulted in a "reluctant rivalry" between Canyon Gate and Greatwood.

The Texas Legislature designated Wharton County Junior College as the college for the city and extraterritorial jurisdiction of Sugar Land as well as for LCISD.

== Parks and recreation ==
There are 12 community parks in Greatwood. The community has playgrounds, ballfields, swimming pools, and clubhouses. There is also an assisted living facility and a privately operated public golf course.
