= Ygnition =

American internet service provider

Ygnition is an American private cable operator (PCO) and broadband Internet services company headquartered in Seattle, Washington focused on the MDU market. It is a privately held company with backers including ComVentures, a venture capital firm based in Palo Alto, California, Advanced Equities and Chrysalis Ventures. Prior to November 2003, the company went by the name Interquest Communications.

== History ==
Ygnition was founded in September, 2001 as a broadband Internet services company, acquiring the assets of a number of bankrupt or distressed broadband service providers. In late 2003, Ygnition launched cable television service at a number of its apartment communities and apartment building owners or developers of condominiums which previously allowed them to be the exclusive provider of certain services to residents of the apartments and condos. Ygnition will bundle Internet and VOIP service with its cable TV offering if the contract allows. These exclusivity contracts were made illegal by FCC ruling 07-889 on October 31, 2007. Cable companies have tried to fight this law but the ruling was upheld May 26 of this year by the U.S. Court of Appeals for the District of Columbia Circuit.gg

As of 2007, Ygnition has Internet access available to 150,000 apartment units and Cable television service available to 50,000 units across seven states.

As Ygnition extends its market through acquisitions, it is also expanding the services offered. Ygnition is expanding into the VOIP market through partnerships with various VOIP wholesalers. Ygnition purchases cable and satellite television service from providers like DISH network and others, then redistributes them through their networks. Internet service is delivered to its service locations from anywhere from a single T1 to OC3 or ethernet over fiber, however multiple T1 circuits is the most common method.

Ygnition uses traffic shaping to prioritize voice over IP (VOIP) traffic. Traffic shaping gives higher priority to latency sensitive communication (VOIP) by delaying latency insensitive communication (large file transfers).

== Services ==
=== Services provided by Ygnition ===
As per Ygnition's service agreement for $49.95 a month, the subscriber may have 2 Email accounts and;

"Use of IAS, E-Mail Storage. Subject to the compliance by Subscriber with all Terms and Conditions of this Agreement, and in exchange for recurring payment of subscription fees, Subscriber shall have the right to use the IAS for accessing the Internet, and for sending and receiving e-mail. Subscriber shall have the right to store up to and including ten Megabytes (10 MB) of e-mail data on the Ygnition Networks server. Subscriber shall be automatically charged a monthly storage for each Megabyte of data in excess of the Free Storage Amount"

For $74.95 a month the subscriber gains 1 static IP address.

Pricing can vary by market and bundled services.

=== Services not provided for by Ygnition ===
Ygnition does not host web sites. No Server space is provided beyond the 10 MB e-mail storage space. However, it is similar to other services in that subscribers are prohibited from hosting their own websites by the no server policy.

Ygnition offers unlimited internet connection time. They do place limits and restrictions on subscriber internet activities. Access to file sharing and downloading is limited and can, at Ygnition's sole discretion, result in service termination.

== Ratings and reviews ==
Ygnition has an Unsatisfactory rating with the Better Business Bureau in Houston. Ygnition has a C− BBB rating in Dallas, Texas and Seattle, Washington.
