= 2026 Fort Bend County Judge election =

Local election in Texas, US

- November 3, 2026
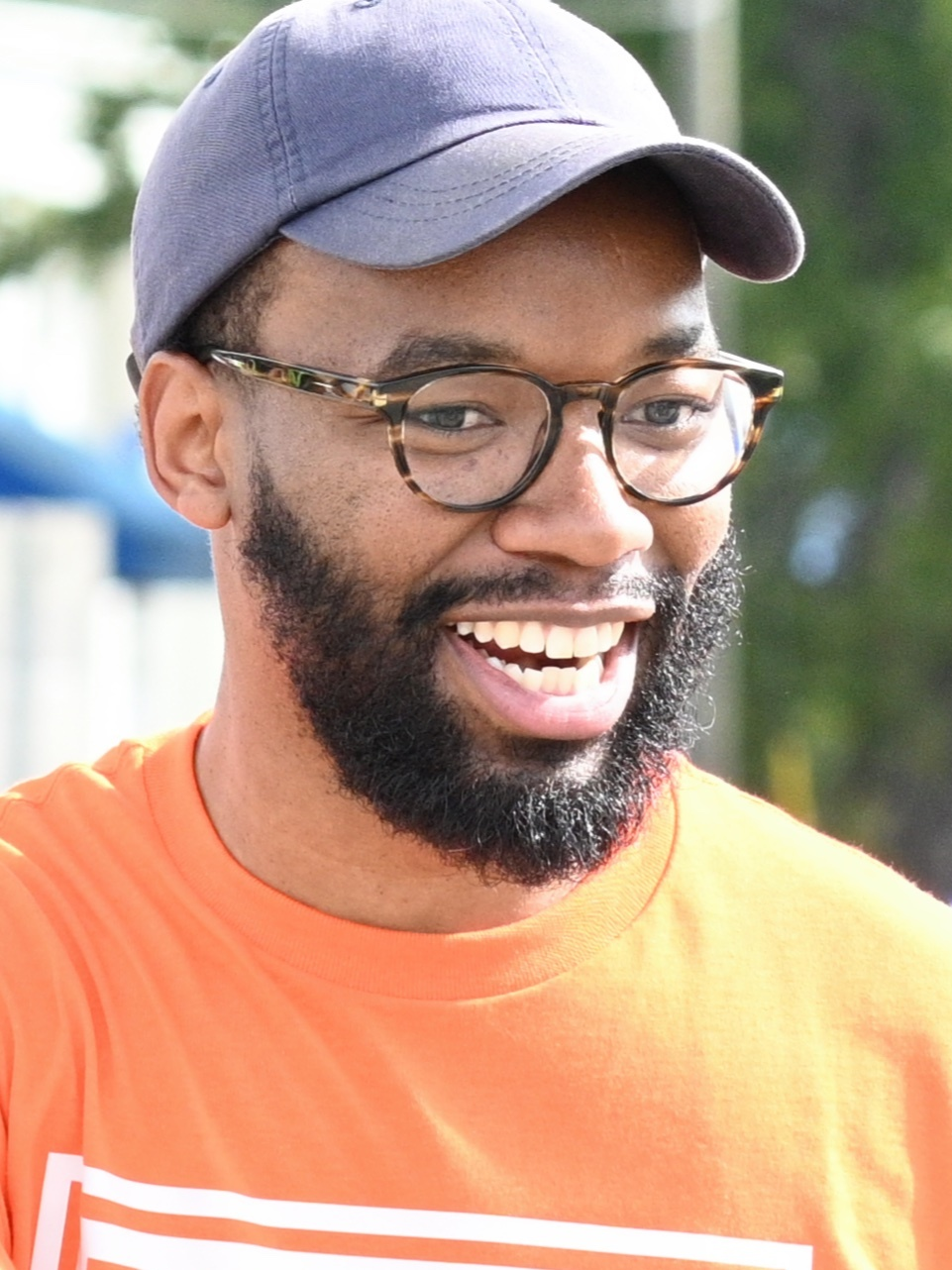

Candidate	Dexter McCoy	Daniel Wong
Party	Democratic	Republican
Popular vote	191,360	131,145
Percentage	59.34%	40.66%
- Results by precinct McCoy: 50–60% 60–70% 70–80% 80–90% >90% Wong: 50–60% 60–70% 70–80% 80–90% Tie: 50% No votes
County Judge before election
Daniel Wong
Republican
Elected County Judge
Dexter McCoy
Democratic

The 2026 Fort Bend County Judge election was held on November 3, 2026, to elect the county judge of Fort Bend County, Texas. Primary elections were held on March 3, and a primary runoff election was held on May 26. Incumbent county judge KP George ran for re-election to a third-consecutive term but was defeated in the primary by Daniel Wong. Wong was then appointed to the position after George was suspended by a judge.

== Republican primary ==
=== Candidates ===
==== Nominee ====
- Daniel Wong, interim county judge (appointed after the primary) and former member of the Sugar Land city council

==== Eliminated in primary ====
- Daryl Aaron, army officer and attorney
- KP George, incumbent judge (previously elected as a Democrat)
- Kenneth Omoruyi, public accountant
- Melissa Wilson, real estate agent and nominee for county commission in 2022

=== Endorsements ===
Daniel Wong

Newspapers

- Houston Chronicle (primary only)

=== Results ===
Republican primary
Party	Candidate	Votes	%
Republican	Daniel Wong	27,495	54.06
Republican	Daryl Aaron	6,483	12.75
Republican	Kenneth Omoruyi	6,367	12.52
Republican	Melissa Wilson	6,232	12.25
Republican	KP George (incumbent)	4,283	8.42
Total votes		50,860	100.00

== Democratic primary ==
=== Candidates ===
==== Nominee ====
- Dexter McCoy, member of the county commission for the 4th precinct

==== Eliminated in primary ====
- Rachelle Carter, associate judge of the Sugar Land municipal court

==== Eliminated in primary ====
- J. Christian Becerra, judge of the 434th District Court
- Cynthia Lenton-Gary, former member of the Fort Bend school board
- Eddie Sajjad, entrepreneur

=== Endorsements ===
Dexter McCoy

U.S. representatives

- Lizzie Fletcher, TX-07 (2019–present)
- Christian Menefee, TX-18 (2026–present)

State legislators

- Jon Rosenthal, state representative from the 135th district (2019–present) and nominee for railroad commissioner in 2026
- James Talarico, state representative from the 50th district (2018–present) and nominee for United States Senate in 2026
- Gene Wu, state representative from the 137th district (2013–present)

Newspapers

- Houston Chronicle (primary only)

=== Results ===
Democratic primary
Party	Candidate	Votes	%
Democratic	Dexter McCoy	29,286	40.42
Democratic	Rachelle Carter	13,717	18.93
Democratic	J. Christian Becerra	12,385	17.09
Democratic	Cynthia Lenton-Gary	11,573	15.97
Democratic	Eddie Sajjad	5,500	7.59
Total votes		72,461	100.00

=== Runoff ===
==== Results ====
Democratic primary runoff
Party	Candidate	Votes	%
Democratic	Dexter McCoy	21,603	74.43
Democratic	Rachelle Carter	7,421	25.57
Total votes		29,024	100.00

== General election ==
=== Post-primary endorsements ===
Dexter McCoy (D)

Newspapers

- Houston Chronicle

=== Polling ===
Poll source	Date(s) administered	Sample size (Note: Key: A – all adults RV – registered voters LV – likely voters V – unclear)	Margin of error	Daniel Wong (R)	Dexter McCoy (D)	Undecided
Texas Southern University	September 9 – October 2, 2026	1,200 (RV)	± 2.8%	40%	49%	11%
