= Duke, Texas =

- Ghost town
- Location within the state of Texas Duke (the United States)
- Coordinates: 29°30′17″N 95°29′10″W
- Country: United States
- State: Texas
- County: Fort Bend
- Elevation: 62 ft (19 m)
- Time zone: UTC-6 (Central (CST))
  - Summer (DST): UTC-5 (CDT)
- ZIP code: 77583
- Area codes: 281, 713, 832
- GNIS feature ID: 1378234

Duke is a ghost town in Fort Bend County, in the U.S. state of Texas. The former settlement's location was west of Arcola along the BNSF Railway near Houston Southwest Airport. In 2014 the town site was no longer accessible by public roads.

== History ==
The town of Duke grew up on the Sugar Land Railroad as a shipping point for sugar cane. Water from conveniently nearby Clear Lake was used to service the railroad locomotives. Postal service began in 1883 with John R. Fenn as postmaster. The bustling community consisted of a hotel, stock yard, store and sugar mills. The town was named after Duke Hessey, who operated the store. On October 19, 1888 there was a political rally at Duke that nearly resulted in violence between the contending factions.

During the tense political struggle which later erupted in the Jaybird-Woodpecker War there was an attempt at civil debate. However, when Woodpecker candidate Kyle Terry took the stage at Duke, he had harsh words for his opponent Ned Gibson, a Jaybird. Though Gibson was not there, one of his brothers took vigorous offense. Terry brandished a pistol but was prevented from using it by an elderly African-American man, a former slave of the Terry family. The organizers of the event had taken the precaution of asking participants to leave their weapons at Fenn's store or in their buggies. So the flash point waited another ten months. Postal service ended at Duke in 1922.

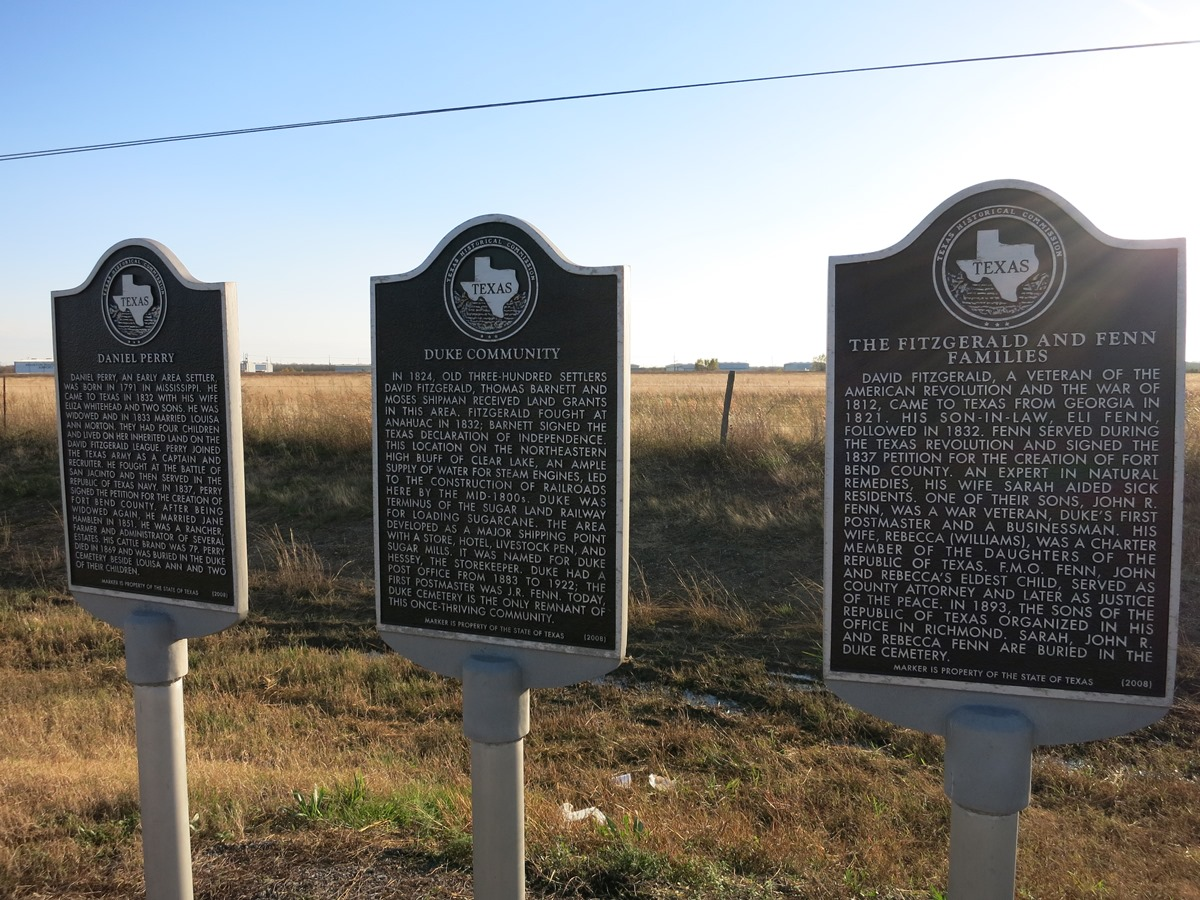
Three historical markers on Highway 6 near Arcola tell about the Duke Community and early settlers from the Perry, Fenn and Fitzgerald families.

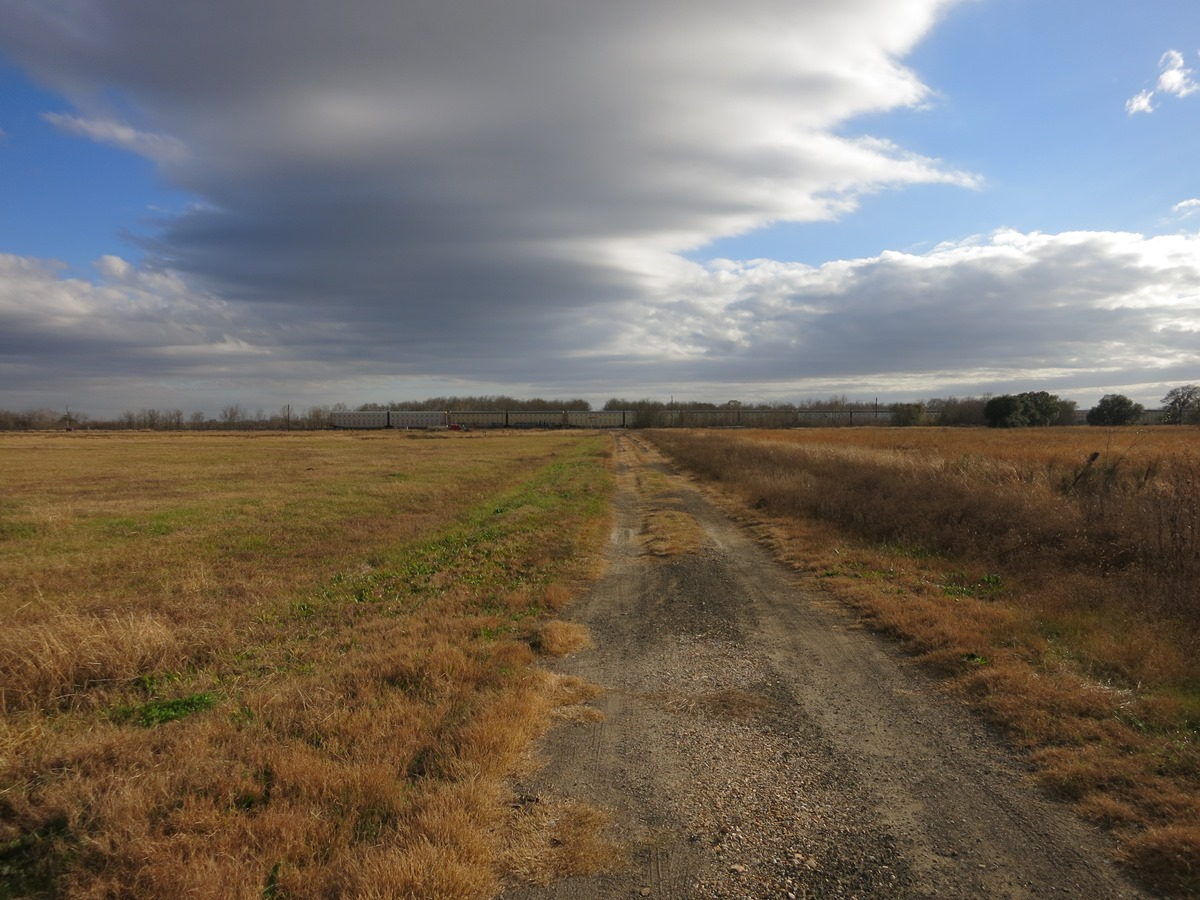
Duke Road is fenced off where it crosses Houston Southwest Airport property. Duke was located just beyond the BNSF Railway freight train in the distance.

== Geography ==
On the 1955 Almeda, Tex. United States Geological Survey 1:24,000 scale map, Duke was located on the Gulf, Colorado and Santa Fe Railroad west of Arcola on the northern side of Clear Lake. On the map, the town was connected by road to what is now McKeever Road to the north. Duke Road crosses Southwest Houston Airport property a few yards from the western end of the runway. Public use was blocked by a fence in January 2014.
