= Bay Ridge Christian College =

Historically black college in Texas, U.S.

- Type: Private
- Established: 1953
- Founders: James Horace Germany
- Religious affiliation: Church of God
- President: Rev. Stanford L. Simmons Sr., Ed.D
- Location: Fort Bend County, Texas, U.S. 29.6161°N 95.3687°W
- Campus: Rural
- Colors: Blue, gold, &white
- Nickname: Eagles
- Website: bayridgecollege.org

Bay Ridge Christian College is an unaccredited, historically black college located in unincorporated Fort Bend County, Texas, United States, north of Kendleton and west of Beasley. This two-year Christian junior college, offers a college credit program (a two-year Ministerial Certificate) and a continuing education program called the Ministry and Leadership Development Institute.

Presidents
Horace Germany	1953–1982
Charles Denniston	1982–1987
Robert C. Williams	1987–1991
Wilford Jordan	1991–1992
Percy Lewis	1993–1995
Sethard Beverly	1995–1996
Verda E. Beach	1996–2005
Dr. Stanford Simmons	2005–present

== Academics ==
Bay Ridge is a two-year liberal arts junior college that provides an alternative college experience for students who may not be prepared to attend a four-year college or university. Bay Ridge graduates may transfer to four-year universities or colleges to pursue their bachelor's degree pursuant to their admission/transfer policies.

Currently, the college does not hold accreditation, but is seeking degree-granting authority and accreditation with the Texas Higher Education Coordinating Board (THECB) and the Southern Association of Colleges and Schools (SACS).

=== Certification programs ===
- Business
- Entrepreneurship
- Education
- Allied Health Care
- Ministry
- Logistics and transportation
- Specialized Technology

== History ==
Bay Ridge Christian College was founded by Dr. James Horace Germany in 1953 in Union, Mississippi to prepare African-American leadership for both urban and rural churches and the communities they serve.

After several years of operating the college in Mississippi, he moved the college to Kendleton, Texas after being beaten by members of the white Citizens Council of Senatobia and local Klansmen.

On September 27, 2008, the college's Board of Trustees announced that Bay Ridge Christian College would become a two-year residential Christian junior college for African-American males.

== Campus ==
Bay Ridge Eagles
- University: Bay Ridge Christian College
- Nickname: Eagles
- Conference: Association of Christian College Athletics
- Location: Kendleton, Texas
- Varsity teams: 1
- Colors: Royal Blue, gold, and white
- Website: bayridgecollege.org

The Bay Ridge Christian College campus is located on FM 2919 outside of Kendleton, Texas, near the San Bernard River. The closest major city is Houston, Texas.

=== Intercollegiate athletics ===
Bay Ridge Christian College formerly competed in the Association of Christian College Athletics (ACCA), in men's basketball. The school's colors are Royal blue, gold, and white and the nickname is the Eagles.
