= Dexter McCoy =

American politician

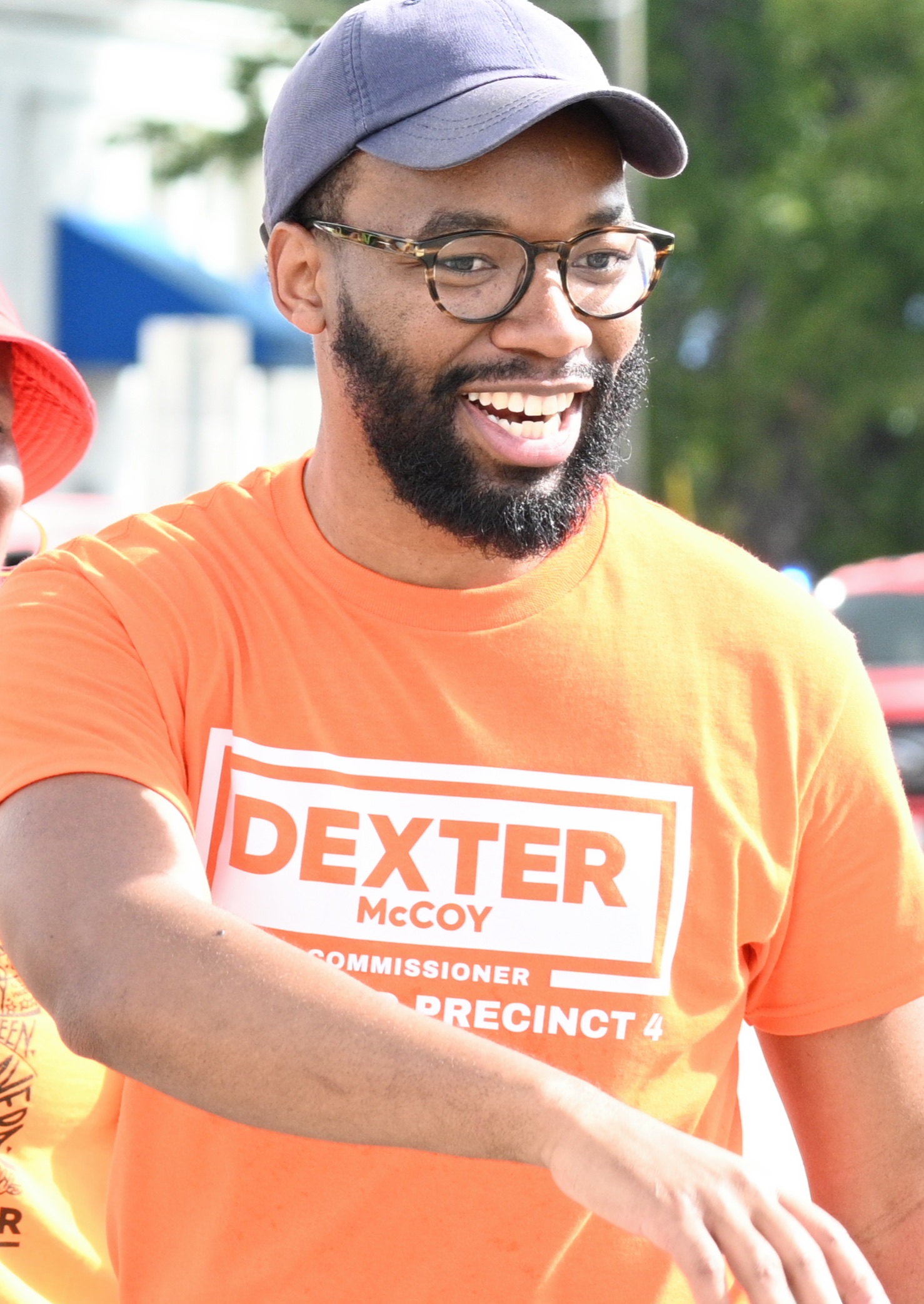

Member of the Fort Bend County Commissioners Court from Precinct 4
- Incumbent
- Assumed office January 1, 2023
- Preceded by: Ken DeMerchant

Personal details
- Born: 1991 or 1992
- Party: Democratic
- Spouse: Chelsea McCoy
- Children: 2
- Education: Boston University (BA)

Dexter L. McCoy (born 1991 or 1992) is an American politician who has served on the Fort Bend County Commissioners Court as the commissioner for Precinct 4 since 2023 and is the Fort Bend County judge-elect. A member of the Democratic Party, he previously worked in the Obama administration, for the Fort Bend Independent School District, and as chief of staff to the Fort Bend County judge. McCoy was elected to the Commissioners Court in 2022 and became the Democratic nominee for Fort Bend County judge in the 2026 election for the seat, which he won.

== Early life and education ==
McCoy was raised in the Mission Bend area of Fort Bend County by parents who had been teenagers when he was born. As a teenager, Dexter won an Optimist Club oratory competition in Southeast Texas and told The Houston Chronicle that he wanted to become the President of the United States one day. He was the president of the student council at his middle school. He attended schools in the Fort Bend Independent School District and later studied at Boston University, graduating from its College of Communication in 2014.

While at Boston University, McCoy served as president of the university's student government and chaired a council of undergraduate student-body presidents in the Boston area. During his tenure, he promoted a university campaign through which students pledged one million hours of community service and encouraged students remaining in Boston over Thanksgiving to celebrate with classmates who could not travel home.

== Early career ==
McCoy served as a political appointee at the U.S. Department of Education during the Obama administration, where his work concerned college access and policies addressing harassment in schools. He later returned to Fort Bend County and worked in a leadership position for the Fort Bend Independent School District. McCoy subsequently served as chief of staff to Fort Bend County Judge KP George. He also served on the Gulf Coast Workforce Development Board, which oversees workforce-development funding in the Houston metropolitan area.

== Fort Bend County Commissioners Court ==
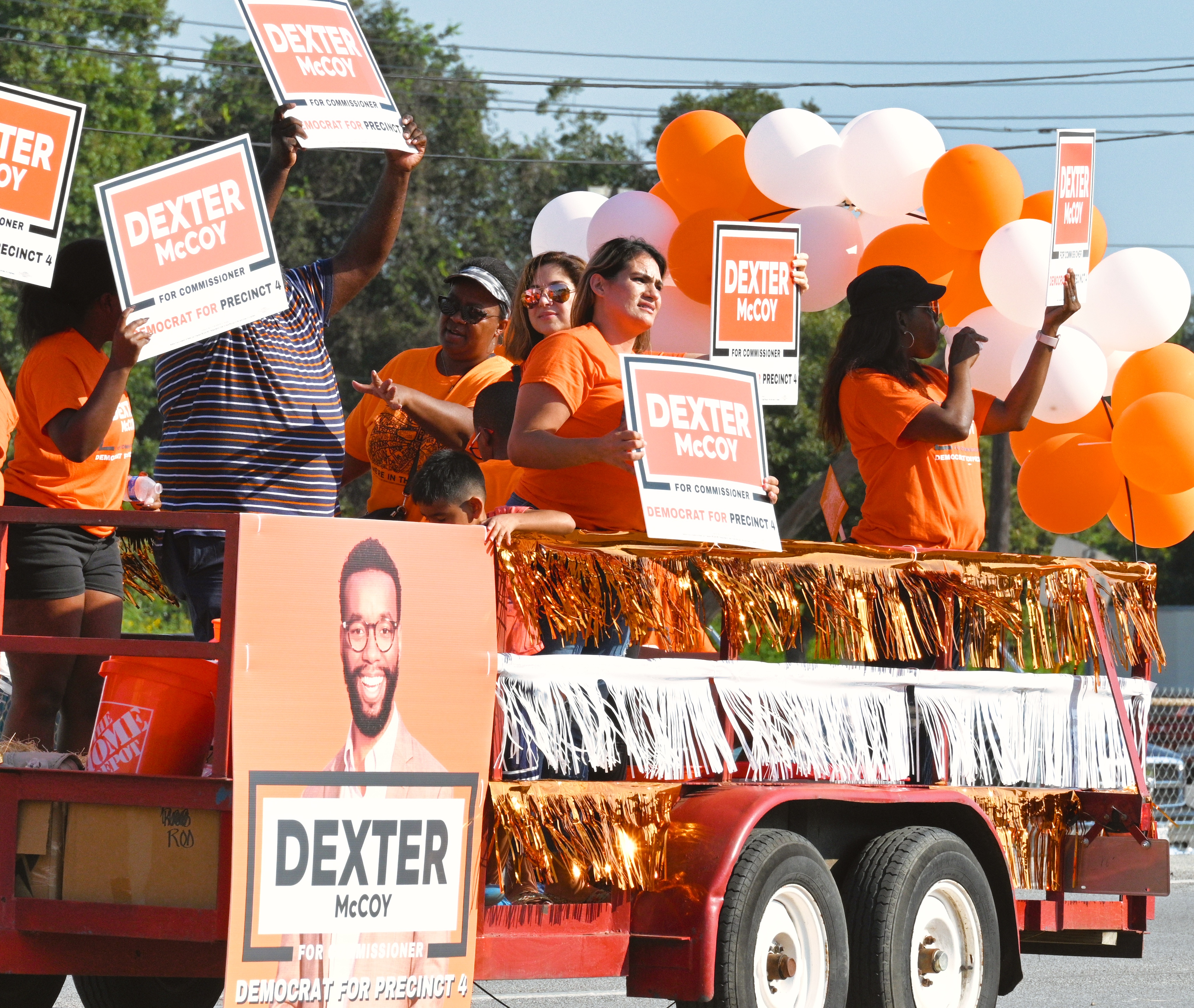
McCoy supporters during the 2022 Fort Bend County Fair Parade

=== 2022 election ===
McCoy challenged incumbent Democratic commissioner Ken DeMerchant for the Precinct 4 position in 2022. In the March 1 Democratic primary, DeMerchant placed third and was eliminated, while McCoy and former Stafford city council member Neeta Sane advanced to a runoff. McCoy defeated Sane in the May 24 runoff. In the November 8 general election, McCoy defeated Republican Ray Aguilar with 55.6 percent of the vote, receiving 55.6% to Aguilar's 44.4%. He took office in January 2023.

=== Employee policies ===
McCoy sponsored Fort Bend County's first paid parental-leave policy for county employees. Adopted unanimously by the Commissioners Court in January 2024, the policy provides eligible employees with as much as six weeks of paid leave following a birth, adoption or foster placement. In March 2024, the court also approved an increase in the amount of sick leave earned by full-time county employees. McCoy said that the change was intended to show how the county takes its employees health seriously.

=== Infrastructure and historical projects ===
McCoy supported the county's 2023 mobility-bond program, a $712.6 million package described as the largest mobility bond in Fort Bend County's history. He said that the size of the package reflected the transportation demands created by the county's rapid population growth and that the bond would not increase the county's debt-service tax rate. In 2024, his office worked with the county engineering department to introduce an online dashboard allowing residents to track the cost and status of mobility bond projects. McCoy also spearheaded a county project to construct an African American memorial at Bates M. Allen Park in Kendleton, a community founded by formerly enslaved people. The voter-approved project was developed following the 2018 discovery of the remains of 95 African Americans on a Fort Bend Independent School District construction site. County officials broke ground on the memorial in August 2024.

=== Other policy positions ===
In December 2024, McCoy proposed including a request in the county's state legislative agenda that Texas lawmakers prohibit firearms and other weapons inside public libraries. He argued that libraries should be treated similarly to schools because they serve large numbers of children. The proposal failed to obtain the four votes required for inclusion in the county's legislative agenda. In 2025, McCoy organized a letter signed by more than 300 residents asking U.S. representative Troy Nehls to hold an in-person town hall in Fort Bend County. The signatories cited concerns including proposed federal education cuts and the availability of congressional representatives to their constituents.

=== Break with KP George and redistricting opposition ===
Although McCoy had previously served as George's chief of staff, he increasingly opposed George during his term on the Commissioners Court. After George switched from the Democratic Party to the Republican Party in June 2025 while facing felony money-laundering charges, McCoy called on him to resign. McCoy described George as “morally corrupt” and argued that the criminal allegations surrounding him had harmed public trust and the county's ability to attract economic-development projects. Following George's change of party, the Commissioners Court acquired a three-member Republican majority and undertook a mid-decade redistricting of the county's four commissioner precincts. McCoy opposed the redistricting and voted against the new map in October 2025 alongside Commissioner Grady Prestage.

=== County judge succession dispute ===
After George was convicted of felony money laundering in March 2026, he was suspended from office in connection with a separate civil removal lawsuit. A visiting judge appointed Republican county-judge nominee Daniel Wong to perform the duties of county judge while the civil case was pending. At Wong's first Commissioners Court meeting, McCoy was the only member to vote against authorizing approximately $52,000 in salary payments to the suspended George.

When the civil removal lawsuit was withdrawn in June, McCoy and Grady Prestage argued that the legal basis for Wong's temporary authority had ended. They walked out of a June 25 court meeting and subsequently declined to attend additional meetings presided over by Wong. Wong and the court's other Republican members disputed their interpretation and continued attempting to conduct county business, producing disagreements over quorum requirements and the validity of actions taken by the court.

== 2026 campaign for county judge ==
McCoy announced his candidacy for Fort Bend County judge in December 2025 for the 2026 election. He said that the county required new leadership because of rising costs and declining public confidence in county government. His campaign emphasized transportation, emergency services, economic development and restoring trust in county government. The campaign had initially been expected to feature KP George seeking a third term. George, who had changed parties in June 2025, lost the Republican primary and was later convicted and sentenced for felony money laundering.

McCoy finished first in a five-candidate Democratic primary on March 3, 2026, but did not receive a majority and advanced to a runoff against former congressional staff member Rachelle Carter. The Houston Chronicle editorial board endorsed McCoy in both rounds of the Democratic primary, citing his policy record, opposition to the 2025 redistricting and willingness to break politically with George, his former employer.

McCoy defeated Carter in the May 26 runoff with approximately 74 percent of the vote, receiving 21,603 votes to Carter's 7,421. His victory occurred despite a countywide failure of electronic voter check-in systems that caused delays at polling locations. McCoy encouraged voters to remain in line and joined other candidates in seeking an extension of voting hours. McCoy faces Republican nominee Daniel Wong in the November 3, 2026 general election. Following his primary victory, McCoy described the election as a response to political turmoil in Fort Bend County and criticized Wong's judicial appointment as a partisan “hostile takeover” of county government.

McCoy won the general election in 2026, along with Democratic commissioners gaining a majority on the court.

== Personal life ==
McCoy and his wife, Chelsea, live in Richmond, Texas, with their two daughters.
