= Grady Prestage =

American politician (born 1958)

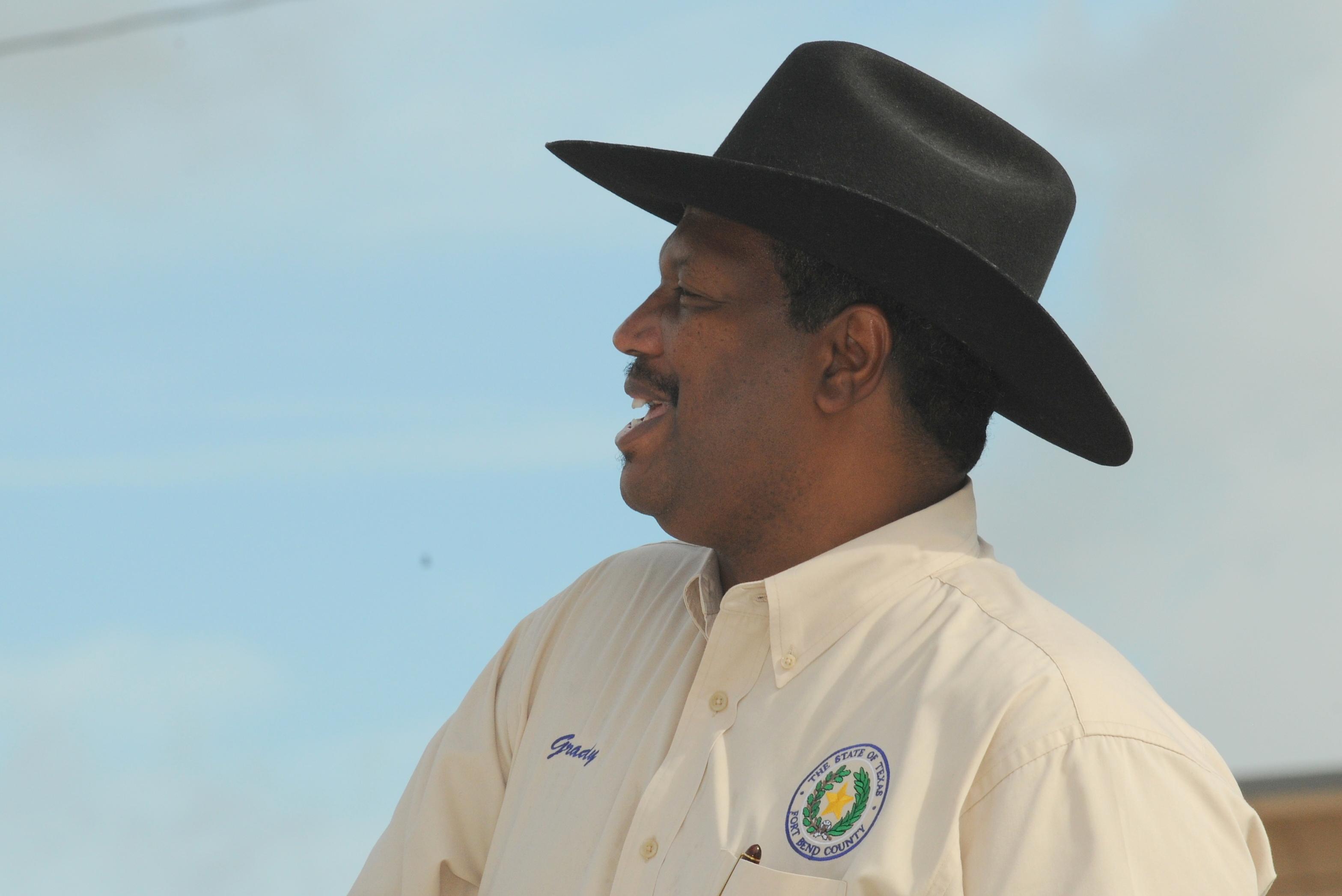
- Prestage in 2012

Member of the Fort Bend County Commissioners Court from Precinct 2
- Incumbent
- Assumed office January 1, 1991
- Preceded by: Ben Denham

Personal details
- Born: James Grady Prestage; July 30, 1958 (age 68) Iowa City, Iowa, U.S.
- Party: Democratic
- Spouse: Fheryl Johnson Prestage
- Children: 2
- Parent: Jewel Prestage (mother)
- Education: Southern University (BS)
- Occupation: Politician; Civil engineer

James Grady Prestage (born July 30, 1958) is an American politician and civil engineer who has served on the Fort Bend County Commissioners Court as the commissioner for Precinct 2 since 1991. A Democrat, he is the longest serving member of the court.

Born in Iowa City and raised in Baton Rouge, Prestage is the son of Jewel Prestage, the first African American woman to earn a doctorate in political science in the United States. He studied civil engineering at Southern University and worked for oil and gas companies along with engineering consulting firms before moving to Fort Bend County around 1981. After narrowly losing a 1986 primary runoff to incumbent Ben Denham, he defeated Denham in 1990 and won the general election at age 32, becoming the first African American to sit on the Commissioners Court since Reconstruction. He has since won reelection eight times, and is seeking another term in 2026.

Prestage's tenure has coincided with Fort Bend County's growth from a largely rural county into one of the largest suburban counties in Texas. His work has centered on infrastructure and county development initiatives. In October 2025, he opposed a mid-decade redistricting of the county's precincts adopted by the court's Republican majority, and in 2026 he stopped attending Commissioners Court meetings amid a dispute over the authority of the interim county judge appointed after County Judge KP George's suspension.

== Early life, education and career ==
Prestage was born in Iowa City, Iowa, on July 30, 1958, while his parents were graduate students at the University of Iowa, and was raised in Baton Rouge, Louisiana. His parents, James Jordan Prestage and political scientist Jewel Prestage, were professors at Southern University. His mother became the first African-American woman to earn a doctorate in political science in the United States and was later described as the "mother of Black political science".

Prestage later recalled that politics was a regular subject of discussion in his childhood home and that his family introduced him to civil rights and political figures including Vernon Jordan and Jesse Jackson. He attended Southern University, where he studied civil engineering and participated in student government.

After graduating with a bachelor's degree in civil engineering, Prestage worked for oil and gas companies and engineering consulting firms. He moved to Fort Bend County around 1981 for an entry-level engineering position and settled in Missouri City, Texas. He later became a partner in a public-relations and marketing consulting firm and was affiliated with the real-estate consulting company Market Developers and the civil-engineering firm Doucet & Associates.

== Fort Bend County Commissioners Court ==
=== Elections ===
Prestage first ran for the Precinct 2 position on the Fort Bend County Commissioners Court in 1986 in a six-way Democratic primary to challenge incumbent Democrat Ben Denham. He advanced to a primary runoff against Denham but lost by 92 votes. He announced his candidacy for the 1990 election, criticizing a redistricting plan proposed by Denham and the rest of the Commissioners Court as a "bad plan". It was reported that the plan was under investigation by the U.S. Department of Justice as a potential racial gerrymander and it became one of the major issues of the campaign. The campaign advanced to a runoff for the Democratic primary between Denham and Prestage after the first round of voting. Coverage of the campaign noted that the election took on "racial overtones", and Prestage argued that Denham was out of touch with the rapidly growing local electorate. Prestage won the Democratic primary runoff by 675 votes, but Denham filed to run as a write-in candidate in the general election, which Prestage called "sour grapes". In the subsequent general election, Prestage won at the age of 32, taking office on January 1, 1991.

The Houston Chronicle described his victory as an upset and attributed Denham's defeat in part to criticism that he had offered only token support for recognizing Martin Luther King Jr. Day as a county holiday, as well as controversy over a remark attributed to him that the county was not ready for a Black commissioner. Denham denied making the remark. His election made him the first African American to sit on the Commissioners Court since Black officials served in Fort Bend County during Reconstruction, over 100 years earlier.

Prestage has subsequently won reelection eight times through 2022. His recurring Democratic primary opponents included teacher and community activist Larry Blackmon, who challenged him in 1998, 2002 and several later elections. In the March 2022 Democratic primary, Prestage received slightly more than 50 percent of the vote against Blackmon and Geneane Hughes, narrowly avoiding a runoff. He defeated Republican Melissa Wilson with approximately 60 percent of the vote in the November general election, winning a ninth term. Prestage defeated Blackmon again in the March 3, 2026, Democratic primary, receiving 63.31% of the vote. He faces Republican Tony Aranda in the November 3 general election.

=== Infrastructure and county development ===
Prestage's tenure coincided with Fort Bend County's transformation from a largely rural county of approximately 228,000 residents into one of the largest suburban counties in Texas. His work has principally concerned roads, drainage, parks, libraries, community centers and other infrastructure needed to accommodate the county's population growth.

Prestage supported the development of the county's toll-road network and mobility-bond programs and was involved in projects including parks, drainage improvements and county annex facilities. He has described his engineering background as influential in his approach to county planning, arguing that roads, drainage and public services should be constructed in advance of population growth.

He advocated the creation of a countywide parks department in 1996 and supported the construction or expansion of Boys & Girls Clubs, libraries and community centers in eastern Fort Bend County. Prestage has identified the establishment of a Boys & Girls Club as his first major initiative in office, and the project was followed by the development of additional clubs elsewhere in the county. He also played a central role in developing a Boys & Girls Club facility in Mission Bend and supported the restoration of a historic Art Deco gymnasium in Missouri City as a community facility.

Prestage has also promoted commercial development as a means of expanding the county's tax base and reducing its dependence on residential property taxes. Critics, including Blackmon, have argued that his approach permitted warehouses and other industrial development near established communities. Prestage has responded that Texas counties have limited zoning authority and that commissioners cannot lawfully block projects that comply with existing regulations.

Much of Prestage's later work has focused on the unincorporated community of Fresno, where older subdivisions were developed with limited roads, drainage, water and other public services. He has compared conditions in some of the neighborhoods to those in colonias and supported projects involving major infrastructure improvements. He also opposed a proposed concrete-crushing facility near Rosharon, joining residents and other county officials in raising concerns about particulate pollution and the facility's proximity to residents. The company withdrew its state air-permit application in March 2026.

=== Criminal justice and contracting policy ===
In 2015, Prestage and state senator Rodney Ellis advocated the creation of a general public defender's office in Fort Bend County. The Commissioners Court ultimately approved an application for state funding despite opposition from some county judges and defense lawyers.

Prestage also supported a county disparity study and the proposed establishment of a minority- and women-owned business contracting program modeled on a similar program in Harris County. The proposal did not obtain sufficient support on the Commissioners Court after the court's partisan majority changed in 2025.

=== Redistricting and county leadership dispute ===
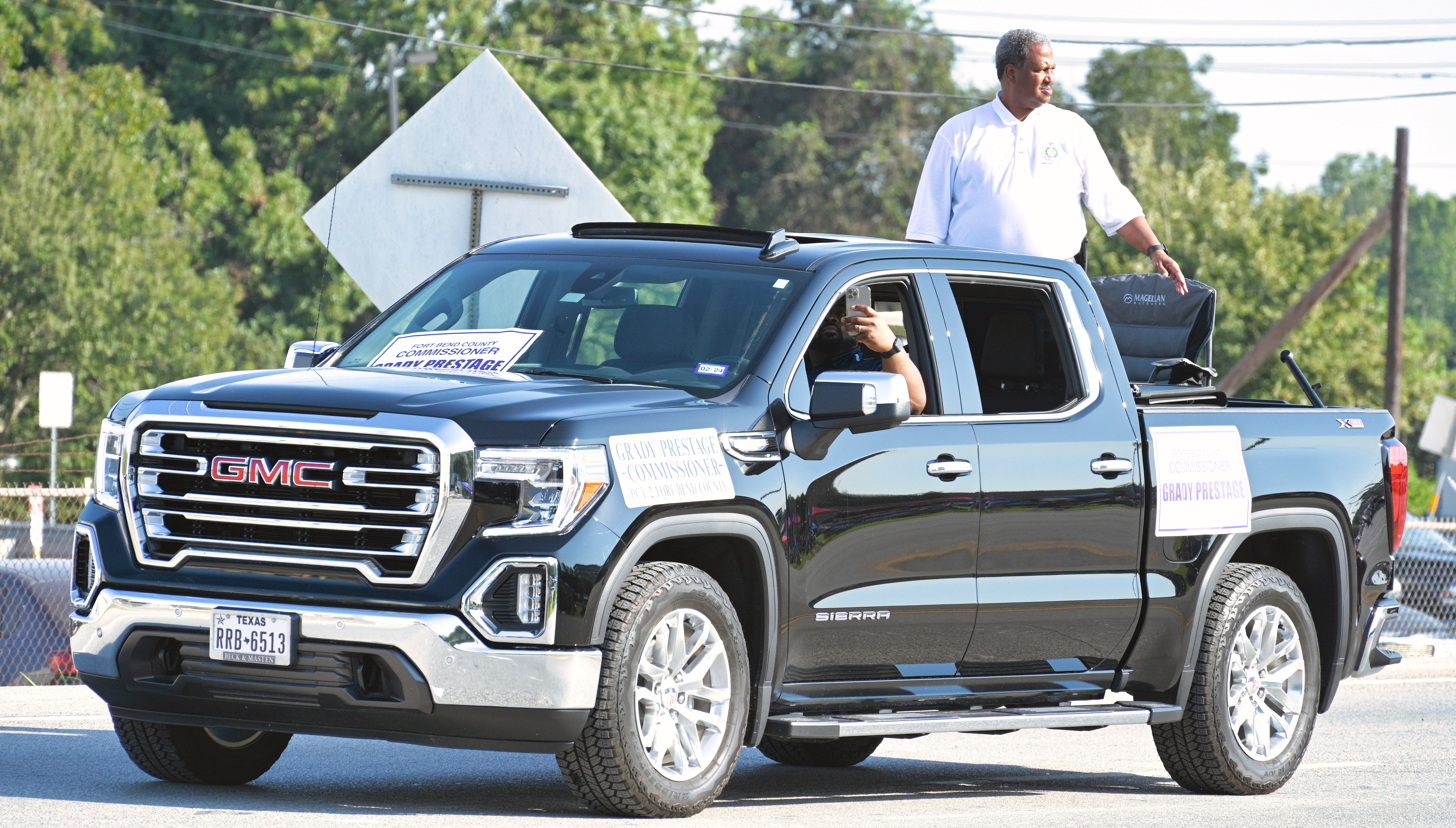
Prestage pictured during the 2022 Fort Bend County Fair Parade

In October 2025, Prestage and Commissioner Dexter McCoy voted against a controversial mid-decade redistricting of the county's four commissioner precincts. The map was adopted by the court's three-member Republican majority. Prestage and McCoy argued that the redistricting divided established communities, weakened minority representation and unnecessarily exposed the county to litigation, while its supporters said it corrected partisan and population imbalances in the previous map.

After County Judge KP George was convicted of money laundering and suspended from office in March 2026, the Commissioners Court designated Prestage, its longest-serving member, as presiding officer and authorized him to sign documents on the county's behalf. A district judge later appointed Republican Daniel Wong to serve as interim county judge while a civil removal proceeding against George was pending.

After a civil case against KP George was dismissed in June 2026, the Fort Bend County Attorney released a statement saying that KP George no longer had the legal authority to act as judge. Prestage and McCoy argued that Wong's authority had expired. On June 25, they walked out of a Commissioners Court meeting, with Prestage stating that Wong's continued participation was contrary to Texas law. Prestage and McCoy subsequently declined to attend additional meetings. Wong and Republican commissioners Andy Meyers and Vincent Morales have continued conducting county business, leading to disagreements over whether the three officials constituted a lawful quorum and whether actions taken by the court were valid.

== Political positions ==
Prestage has generally supported Democratic initiatives involving minority representation, but has also been characterized as a business-friendly and pro-growth suburban politician whose priorities are infrastructure and county services rather than partisan politics. He has argued that attracting commercial development broadens the county tax base, while acknowledging that county government possesses less land-use authority than municipalities under Texas law.

== Personal life ==
Prestage is married to Fheryl Johnson Prestage. They have two children, Dustin and Erin. He was among the organizers of the Xi Kappa Lambda chapter of Alpha Phi Alpha in the Missouri City area in the early 1980s.
