= Fort Bend Herald and Texas Coaster =

- Type: Daily newspaper
- Format: Broadsheet
- Owner: Hartman Newspapers
- Publisher: Clyde C. King
- Editor: Scott Reese Willey
- Founded: 1892
- Headquarters: 1902 S. 4th St., Rosenberg, Texas, 77471, United States
- Circulation: 3,366 (as of 2023)
- Website: fbherald.com

The Fort Bend Herald and Texas Coaster is a newspaper based in Rosenberg, Texas, covering the Fort Bend County area of Texas. It publishes three days a week. It is owned by Hartman Newspapers.

== History ==
The Richmond Democrat (est. 1888) changed its name to The Texas Coaster in 1895 when George Dunlop purchased it. His family continued to publish the paper after his death in 1900, selling to J.C. Florea in 1905. H.M. Shannon bought the paper in 1911, publishing it until he died in 1938. His son, Windel Shannon, led the paper from 1938 until his own death in 1962.

The Rosenberg News was established in 1900 by George Vinson, and later became the Rosenberg Herald. After local banker F.W. McKay bought the newspaper to rescue it from legal trouble in 1910, it was sold to Marion and Goldie Parrott in 1919, who sold it to Windel Shannon in 1952.

In 1957–58, Southern Newspapers bought the papers, along with the Fort Bend Reporter (est. circa 1921) and merged them to form the twice-weekly Herald-Coaster. It became a five-day newspaper in 1967 and was bought by Bill Hartman's newspaper company in 1974.

The newspaper added a Friday edition in 1978. In 2005, the publication re-branded itself as the Fort Bend Herald and Texas Coaster.
