= Fort Bend Sun =

- Type: Weekly
- Format: Broadsheet
- Owner: ASP Westward LP
- Publisher: George Boehme
- Editor: John Pape
- Founded: 1982
- Ceased publication: 2022
- Headquarters: 13815 US Highway 59; Sugar Land, TX 77478; United States
- Circulation: 61,022
- Website: yourfortbendnews.com

The Fort Bend Sun (formerly known as the Fort Bend/Southwest Sun), was a weekly community newspaper published in Sugar Land, Texas from 1982 to 2022. The newspaper had a weekly circulation of over 61,000 and was delivered free of charge to homes throughout the cities of Sugar Land, Missouri City, and much of Fort Bend County. It published every Wednesday.
