= Fort Bend Star =

- Type: Weekly newspaper
- Owner: Street Media
- Founder: Beverly "Bev" Carter
- Editor: Ken Fountain
- Founded: 1978
- Ceased publication: 2026
- Language: English
- City: Stafford, Texas
- Website: fortbendstar.com

The Fort Bend Star was a weekly newspaper headquartered in Stafford, Texas in Greater Houston. It was published for 48 years from 1978 to 2026.

== History ==
The newspaper was founded in 1978 by Beverly "Bev" Carter. Her newspaper included a column written by her, "Bev's Burner." Mike Glenn of the Houston Chronicle wrote that it "mixed homey personal anecdotes with sometimes biting political observations." She often criticized politicians including Governor of Texas Rick Perry and Congressman Tom Delay.

Carter died of cancer in 2013. Her son Michael Fredrickson then inherited the paper. In 2017, McElvy Vasquez, LLC, with Jonathan McElvy serving as president and Frank Vasquez serving as publisher, purchased the paper.

In 2022, McElvy sold the Star and other papers (including The Leader and Greensheet, also based in Houston) to Los Angeles-based Street Media. The company closed the Star in 2026.
