= Houston Southwest Airport =

- IATA: none; ICAO: KAXH; FAA LID: AXH

Summary
- Airport type: Public
- Owner: James Griffith, Jr.
- Serves: Houston, Texas
- Location: Arcola, Texas
- Elevation AMSL: 69 ft (21 m)
- Coordinates: 29°30′22″N 095°28′37″W
- Website: www.HoustonAirport.com

Map
- Location of airport in Texas AXH (the United States)

Runways
Direction	Length		Surface
Direction	ft	m	Surface
9/27	5,002	1,525	Asphalt

Statistics (2023)
- Aircraft operations (year ending 4/11/2023): 42,624
- Based aircraft: 120
- Sources: airport web site and FAA

Houston Southwest Airport or Houston-Southwest Airport (ICAO: KAXH, FAA LID: AXH) is a public-use airport located in Arcola, a city in Fort Bend County, Texas, United States, 15 miles (24 km) southwest of the central business district of Houston. It is privately owned by James Griffith, Jr.

Although most U.S. airports use the same three-letter location identifier for the FAA and IATA, Houston Southwest Airport is assigned AXH by the FAA but has no designation from the IATA.

== Facilities and aircraft ==
Houston-Southwest Airport covers an area of 165 acres (67 ha) which contains one runway designated 9/27 with a 5,002 x 100 ft (1,525 x 30 m) asphalt surface. For the 12-month period ending April 11, 2023, the airport had 42,624 aircraft operations, an average of 117 per day: 93% general aviation, 7% air taxi, and <1% military. At that time there were 120 aircraft based at this airport: 102 single-engine, 13 multi-engine, 2 jet and 3 helicopter.

== See also ==
- List of airports in Texas
