= Kendleton, Texas =

- City
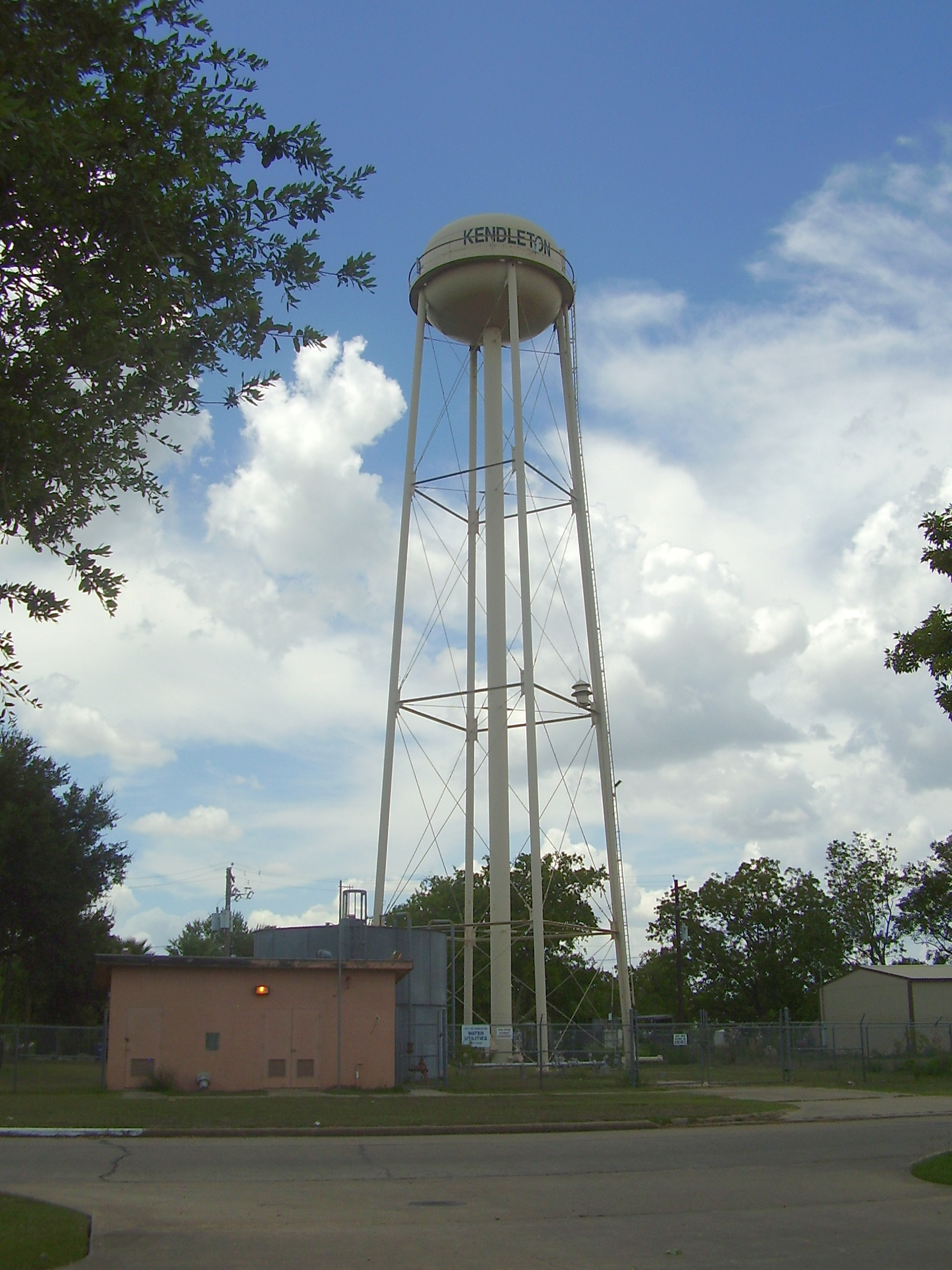
- Water tower

- Location of Kendleton, Texas
- Coordinates: 29°26′52″N 95°59′59″W
- Country: United States
- State: Texas
- County: Fort Bend

Area
  - Total: 1.10 sq mi (2.86 km^{2})
  - Land: 1.10 sq mi (2.85 km^{2})
  - Water: 0.0039 sq mi (0.01 km^{2})
- Elevation: 95 ft (29 m)

Population (2020)
  - Total: 343
  - Density: 312/sq mi (120/km^{2})
- Time zone: UTC-6 (Central (CST))
  - Summer (DST): UTC-5 (CDT)
- ZIP code: 77451
- Area code: 979
- FIPS code: 48-38848
- GNIS feature ID: 1339029
- Website: http://www.kendletontx.net/

Kendleton is a city in western Fort Bend County, Texas, United States, located southwest of Sugar Land. It was established by emancipated slaves after the Civil War. The population was 343 at the 2020 census.

== History ==
What is now Kendleton was a part of William E. Kendall's plantation. In the 1860s Kendall divided his property into various small farms and sold the plots to African Americans who were former slaves. The community of the farms became known as Kendleton.

In 1882, the New York, Texas and Mexican Railway Company established a railroad track between Rosenberg and Victoria, which passed through Kendleton. In 1884, a post office opened. In 1890, Kendleton had 25 inhabitants and a general store. In 1896, the community had two additional general stores and two churches; one was Baptist and one was Methodist. In 1900, 116 people lived in Kendleton. In 1933, Kendleton had 36 residents. By the late 1940s, Kendleton had approximately 100 residents. In the 1960s and 1970s, the population fluctuated between 150 and 200 people. In 1973, voters approved the incorporation of Kendleton as a city. After incorporation, the population increased to over 600. In 1990, Kendleton had 496 residents. In 2000, Kendleton had 466 residents. According to the Handbook of Texas, area residents estimated that about 2,200 people lived in Kendleton and surrounding areas.

== Geography ==
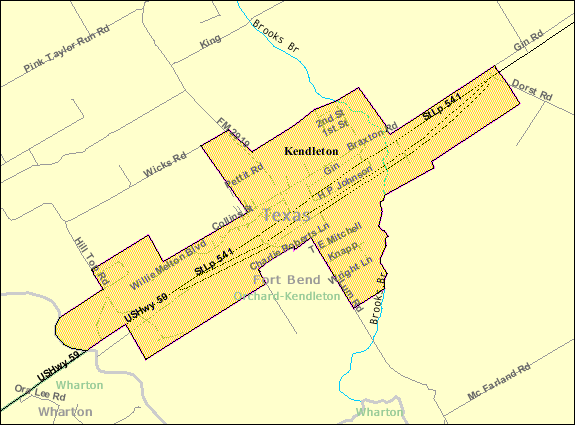
Map of Kendleton

Kendleton is located in western Fort Bend County at 29°26′52″N 95°59′59″W (29.447872, –95.999806). Its western boundary is the San Bernard River, the Fort Bend/Wharton County line.

U.S. Route 59, a four-lane divided highway, runs through the city, closely bypassing the original town center which is now served by Texas State Highway Loop 541. Farm to Market Road 2919 runs north from Kendleton to East Bernard. Via US 59 the city is 15 miles (24 km) southwest of Rosenberg and 6 miles (10 km) northeast of Hungerford.

According to the United States Census Bureau, the city of Kendleton has a total area of 1.1 square miles (2.9 km^{2}), of which 0.004 square miles (0.01 km^{2}), or 0.45%, is water.

== Demographics ==
Historical population
Census	Pop.	Note	%±
1980	606		—
1990	496		−18.2%
2000	466		−6.0%
2010	380		−18.5%
2020	343		−9.7%
U.S. Decennial Census; 2020 Census

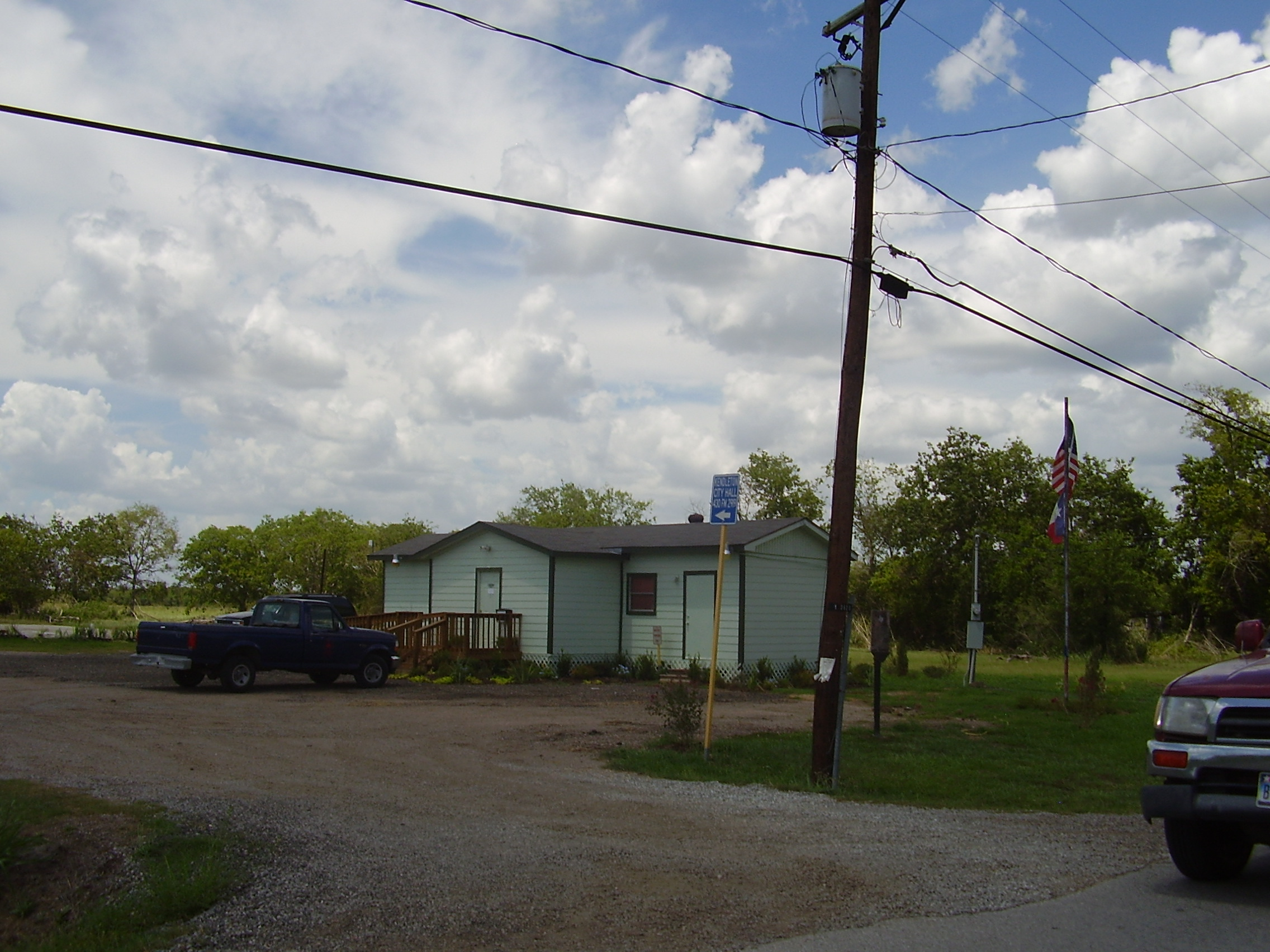
City hall

=== Racial and ethnic composition ===
Kendleton city, Texas – Racial and ethnic composition Note: the US Census treats Hispanic/Latino as an ethnic category. This table excludes Latinos from the racial categories and assigns them to a separate category. Hispanics/Latinos may be of any race.
Race / Ethnicity (NH = Non-Hispanic)	Pop 2000	Pop 2010	Pop 2020	% 2000	% 2010	% 2020
White alone (NH)	26	15	13	5.58%	3.95%	3.79%
Black or African American alone (NH)	366	314	219	78.54%	82.63%	63.85%
Native American or Alaska Native alone (NH)	0	0	0	0.00%	0.00%	0.00%
Asian alone (NH)	0	0	1	0.00%	0.00%	0.29%
Native Hawaiian or Pacific Islander alone (NH)	1	0	0	0.21%	0.00%	0.00%
Other race alone (NH)	0	0	10	0.00%	0.00%	2.92%
Mixed race or Multiracial (NH)	2	5	5	0.43%	1.32%	1.46%
Hispanic or Latino (any race)	71	46	95	15.24%	12.11%	27.70%
Total	466	380	343	100.00%	100.00%	100.00%

=== 2020 census ===
As of the 2020 census, Kendleton had a population of 343. The median age was 42.1 years. 20.1% of residents were under the age of 18 and 19.2% of residents were 65 years of age or older. For every 100 females there were 91.6 males, and for every 100 females age 18 and over there were 81.5 males age 18 and over.

0.0% of residents lived in urban areas, while 100.0% lived in rural areas.

There were 138 households in Kendleton, of which 35.5% had children under the age of 18 living in them. Of all households, 38.4% were married-couple households, 21.0% were households with a male householder and no spouse or partner present, and 34.8% were households with a female householder and no spouse or partner present. About 27.6% of all households were made up of individuals and 12.3% had someone living alone who was 65 years of age or older.

There were 155 housing units, of which 11.0% were vacant. The homeowner vacancy rate was 0.0% and the rental vacancy rate was 10.4%.

Racial composition as of the 2020 census
Race	Number	Percent
White	31	9.0%
Black or African American	220	64.1%
American Indian and Alaska Native	0	0.0%
Asian	1	0.3%
Native Hawaiian and Other Pacific Islander	0	0.0%
Some other race	64	18.7%
Two or more races	27	7.9%
Hispanic or Latino (of any race)	95	27.7%

=== 2000 census ===
At the 2000 census, there were 466 people, 178 households and 116 families residing in the city. The population density was 437.9 inhabitants per square mile (169.1/km^{2}). There were 209 housing units at an average density of 196.4 per square mile (75.8/km^{2}). The racial makeup of the city was 12.45% White, 78.97% African American, 0.21% Pacific Islander, 5.15% from other races, and 3.22% from two or more races. Hispanic or Latino of any race were 15.24% of the population.

There were 178 households, of which 27.5% had children under the age of 18 living with them, 38.8% were married couples living together, 21.9% had a female householder with no husband present, and 34.3% were non-families. 33.1% of all households were made up of individuals, and 14.0% had someone living alone who was 65 years of age or older. The average household size was 2.62, The average family size was 3.27.

Age distribution was 29.4% under the age of 18, 8.8% from 18 to 24, 26.0% from 25 to 44, 23.4% from 45 to 64, and 12.4% who were 65 years of age or older. The median age was 35 years. For every 100 females, there were 77.9 males. For every 100 females age 18 and over, there were 72.3 males.

The median household income was $21,563, and the median family income was $35,795. Males had a median income of $34,167 versus $21,964 for females. The per capita income for the city was $12,196. About 14.6% of families and 19.5% of the population were below the poverty line, including 14.7% of those under age 18 and 28.6% of those age 65 or over.

== Government and infrastructure ==
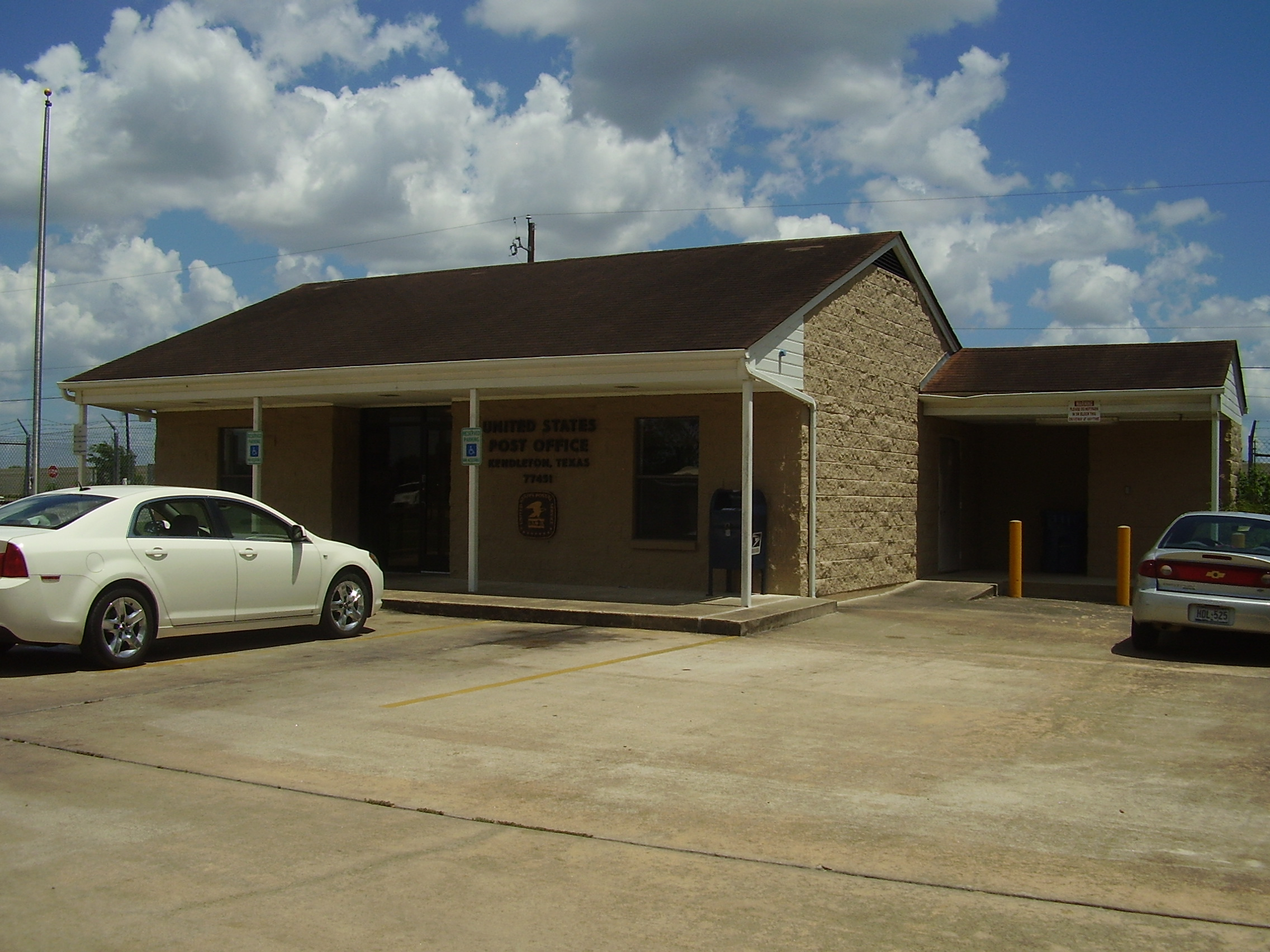
Post office

The United States Postal Service A post office opened in Kendleton in 1884, shortly after Kendleton's founding. Kendleton Post Office is located at 13635 Willie Melton Boulevard. Benjamin F. Williams was the first postmaster and also served in the state legislature. In July 2011 the USPS announced that the post office may close. The nearest available post office to Kendleton is over 10 miles (16 km) from the city. Darryl Humphrey, the mayor of Kendleton, criticized the proposed closing. Cindy Horswell and Megan Ryan of the Houston Chronicle said that Humphrey "feels like his community will be erased from society if the post office is removed, too."

Fort Bend County does not have a hospital district. OakBend Medical Center serves as the county's charity hospital which the county contracts with.

== Education ==
=== Primary and secondary schools ===
==== Public schools ====
Kendleton is within the Lamar Consolidated Independent School District (LCISD). Students are zoned to Becerra Elementary School and the following in Rosenberg: Navarro Middle School (grade 6), George Junior High School (grades 7-8), and B. F. Terry High School (grades 9-12).

Historically the Kendleton area schools served Kendleton and surrounding communities. In 1903 the school system had 202 African-American students in three schools, and 12 White students in two schools. Previously primary school students attended the Kendleton Independent School District (KISD)'s Powell Point Elementary School, located Powell Point, an unincorporated area north of Kendleton. In 1985 LCISD began serving secondary school students in the KISD territory, while primary school students went to Powell Point.

On March 25, 2010, Texas Education Agency (TEA) Commissioner Robert Scott announced that he was closing the Kendleton Independent School District. The closing was effective July 1, 2010. Kendleton ISD will be merged with Lamar Consolidated Independent School District. Commissioner Scott's statement was, "While it saddens me to close a school district, years of effort, including reconstituting its school, have failed to turn this district around. I believe students would be ill-served if Kendleton is allowed to continue to operate. The Texas Education Agency pledges to work with the citizens of Kendleton and Lamar Consolidated to make this transition as smooth as possible." As a result of the closure, students at Powell Point were rezoned to Beasley and Wessendorf. LCISD, for a two-year period, was to operate its head start program at Powell Point. In July 2011 mayor Darryl Humphrey said that his community was still recovering from the closing of Powell Point Elementary.

After the LCISD merger, Beasley Elementary became the zoned school. Previously Kendleton was zoned to Wessendorff Middle School, Lamar Junior High School, and Lamar Consolidated High School of LCISD. Wright Junior High School and Randle High School opened in 2021. For a time Kendleton was zoned to those schools.

=== Colleges and universities ===
The designated community college for LCISD is Wharton County Junior College.

Bay Ridge Christian College was located north of Kendleton in an unincorporated section of Fort Bend County.

== Parks and recreation ==
Fort Bend County owns and operates the Bates M. Allen Park, located just outside the city limits of Kendleton. The 235-acre (0.95 km^{2}) park includes a canoe ramp, a fishing pier, grills, a historical site, a lake, an observation deck, two pavilions, a play area, a sand volleyball court, tables, toilet facilities, walking trails and wetlands.

In 2023 the county stated it would add a memorial to African-American settlements, which would mean much of the park would be revamped. The cost would be $4,000,000.

== Gallery ==
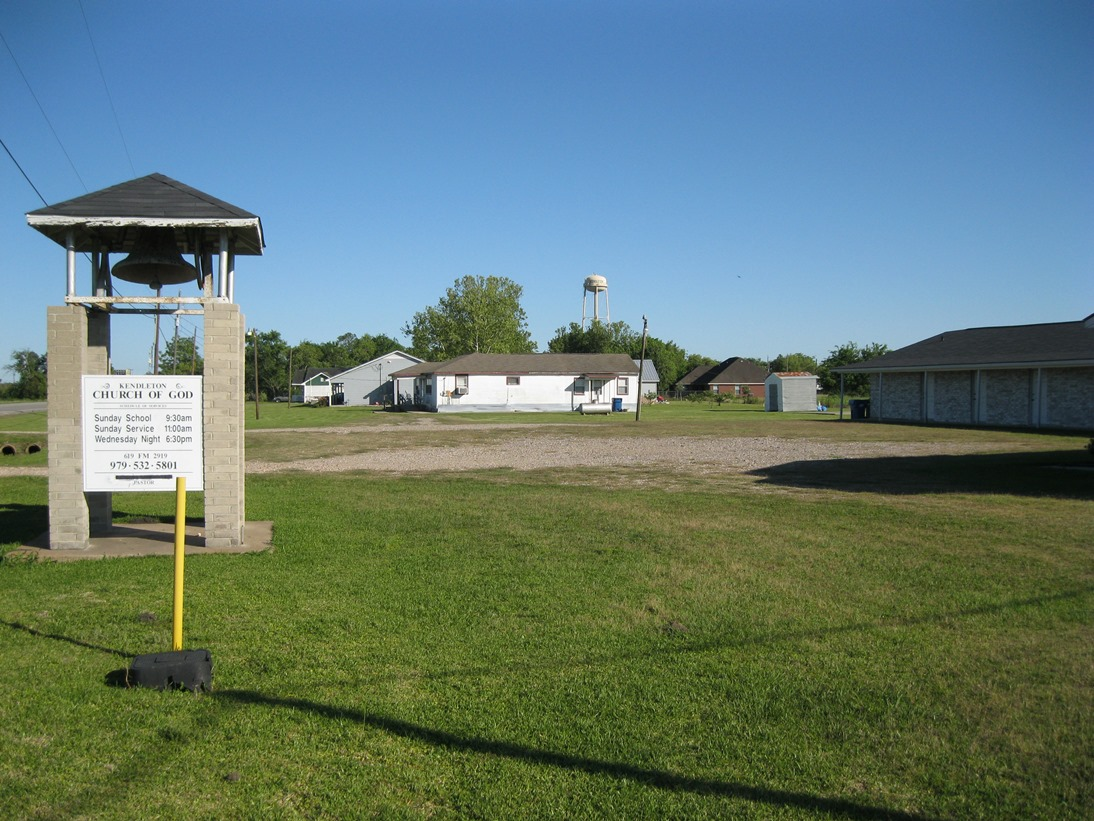
Church of God on FM 2919 in Kendleton

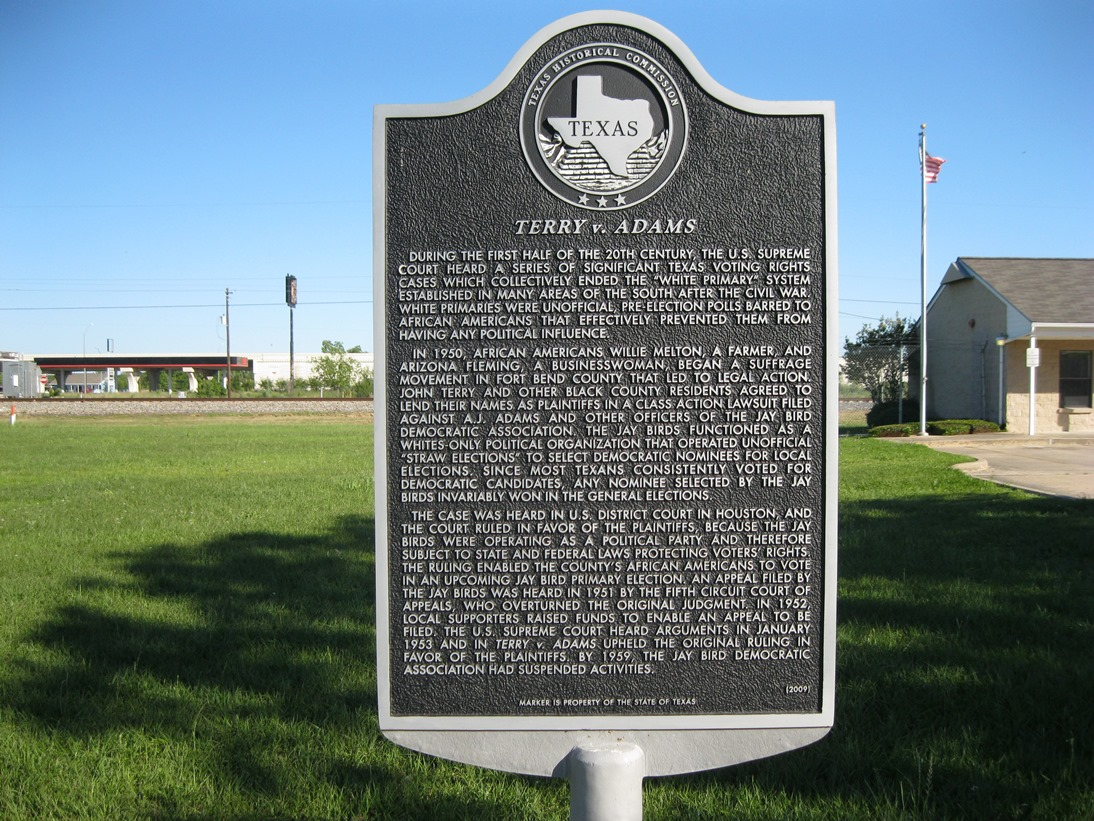
Marker explains the US Supreme Court case Terry v. Adams

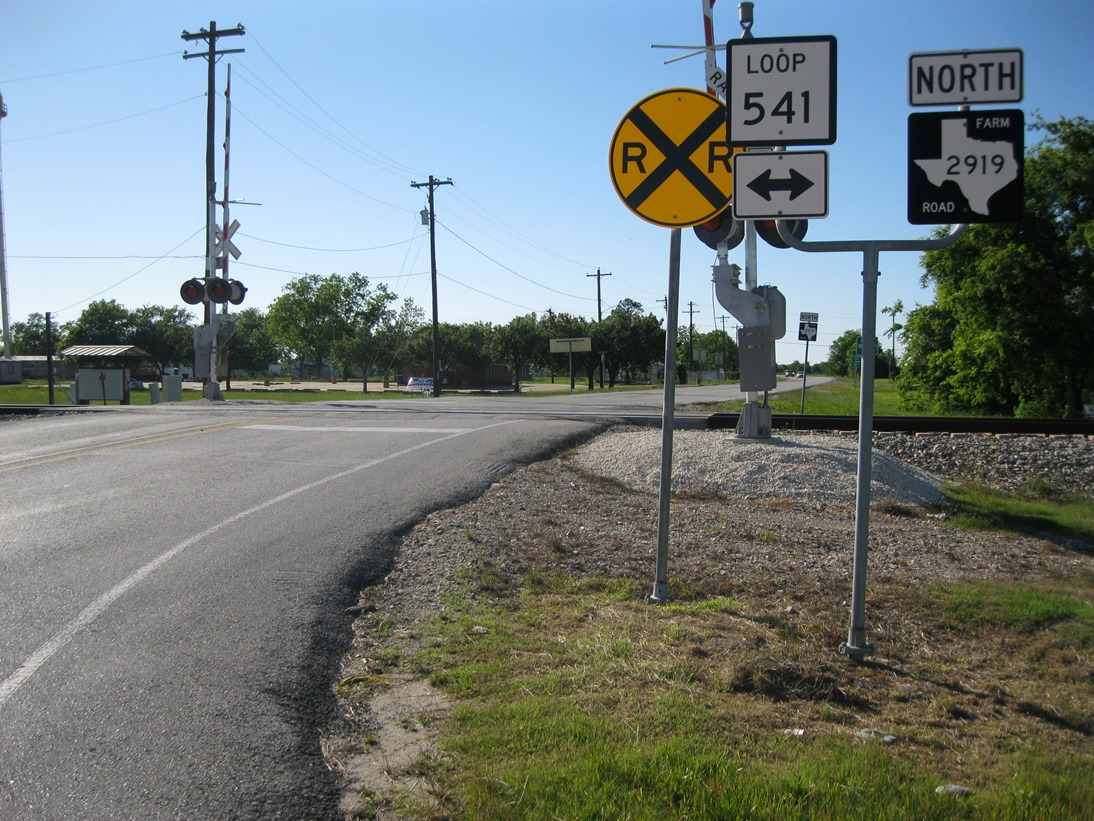
Union Pacific railroad crossing at Loop 541 and FM 2919

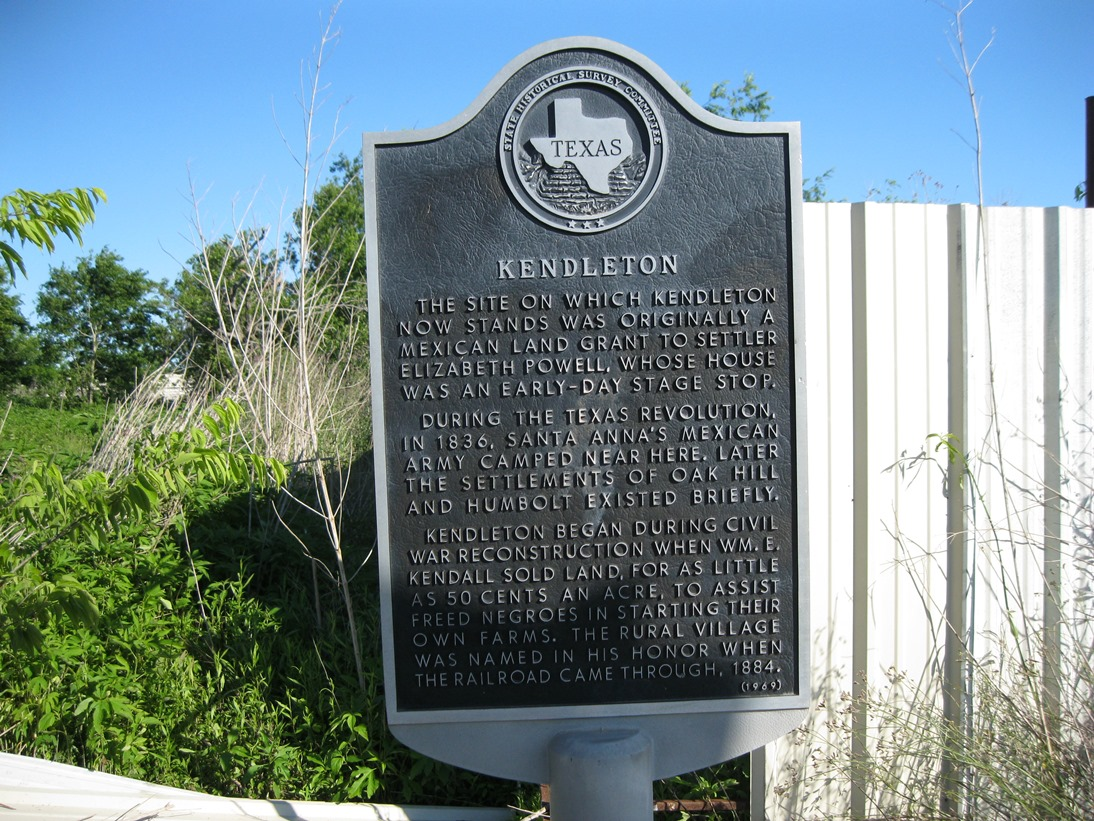
Marker on Loop 541 gives the history of Kendleton

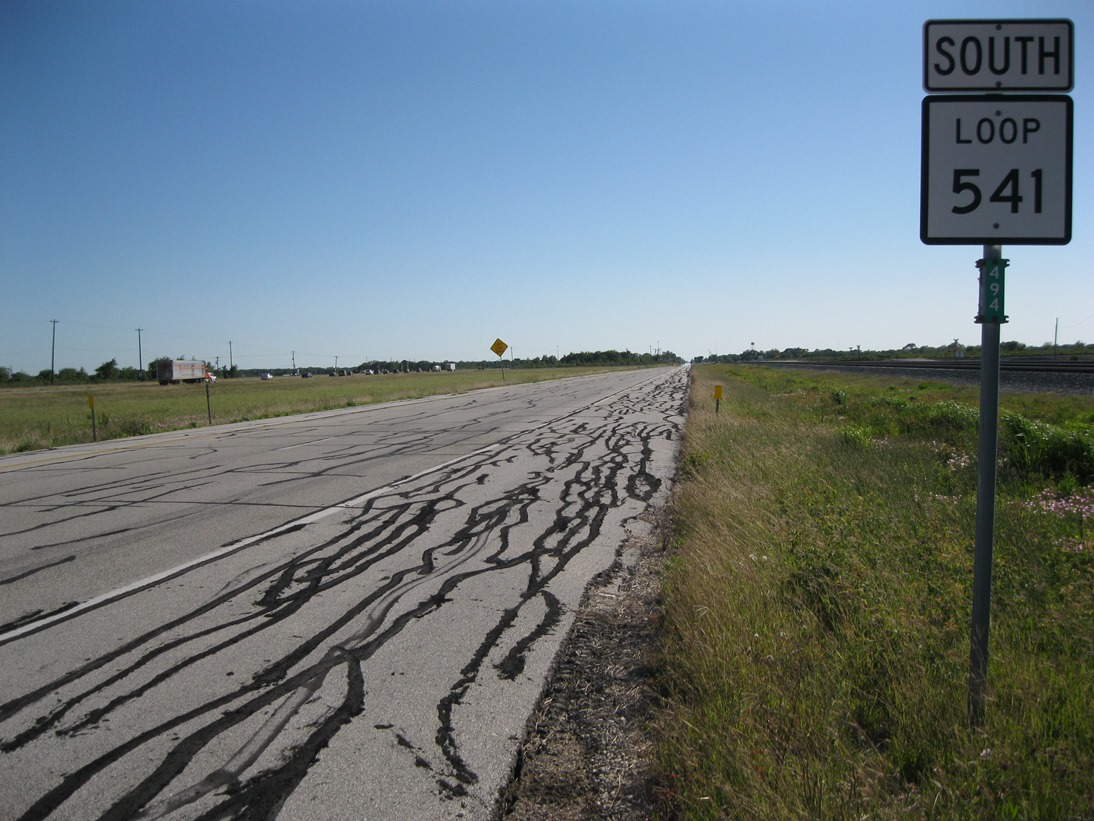
Loop 541 after the US 59 exit to the northeast of Kendleton
