= Fort Bend County, Texas =

County in Texas, United States

- County
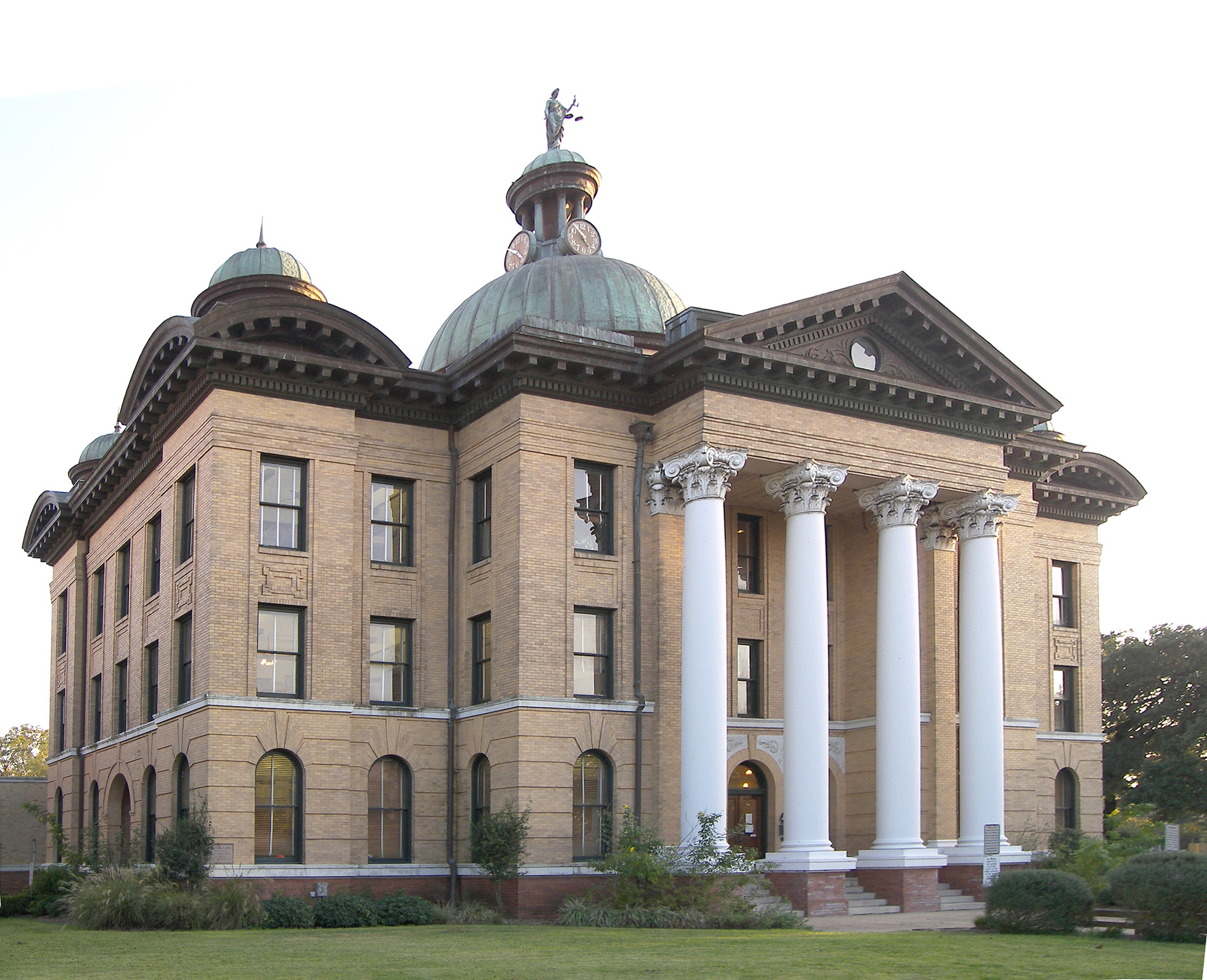
- Fort Bend County Courthouse, Richmond, November 2008

- Seal

- Location within the U.S. state of Texas
- Coordinates: 29°31′30″N 95°45′18″W
- Country: United States
- State: Texas
- Founded: 1837 (created); January 13, 1838 (organized)
- Named for: A blockhouse positioned in a bend of the Brazos River
- Seat: Richmond
- Largest city: Sugar Land

Area
  - Total: 885.250 sq mi (2,292.79 km^{2})
  - Land: 861.785 sq mi (2,232.01 km^{2})
  - Water: 23.465 sq mi (60.77 km^{2}) 2.65%

Population (2026)
  - Total: 999,354
  - Estimate (2026): 999,400 ▲
  - Density: 1,112.141/sq mi (429.400/km^{2})
- Time zone: UTC−6 (Central)
  - Summer (DST): UTC−5 (CDT)
- Congressional districts: 7th, 9th, 22nd
- Website: www.fortbendcountytx.gov

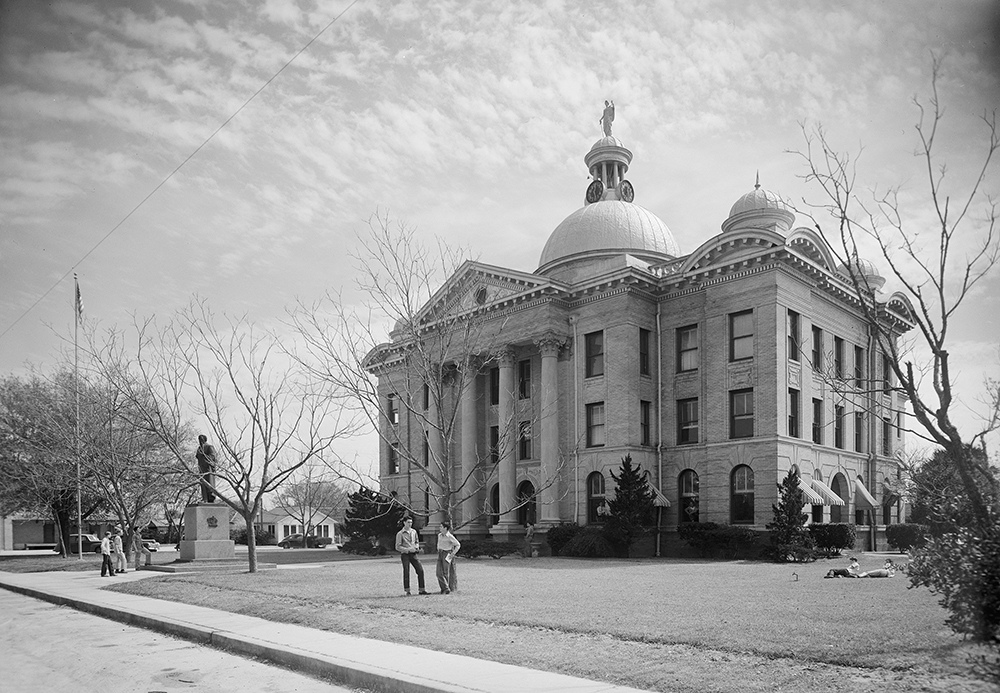
Fort Bend County Courthouse in 1948

Fort Bend County is a county in the U.S. state of Texas. The county was founded on December 29, 1837, and organized the next year. It is named for a blockhouse at a bend of the Brazos River. The community developed around the fort in early days. The county seat is Richmond. The largest city located entirely within the county borders is Sugar Land. The largest city by population in the county is Houston, but most of Houston's population is located in neighboring Harris County.

Fort Bend County is included in the Houston–Pasadena–The Woodlands metropolitan statistical area and the Texas Triangle megaregion of the United States. As of the 2020 census, its population was 822,779, making it the state's eighth-most populous county. In 2017, Forbes ranked it the fifth-fastest growing county in the United States.

In 2020, the United States Census announced that Fort Bend County had the largest ethnic-identified population of Asian people among the 254 Texas counties, making up 22.2 percent of total county residents.

== History ==
Before European settlement, the area was inhabited by Karankawa Indians. Spanish colonists generally did not reach the area during their colonization, settling more in South Texas.

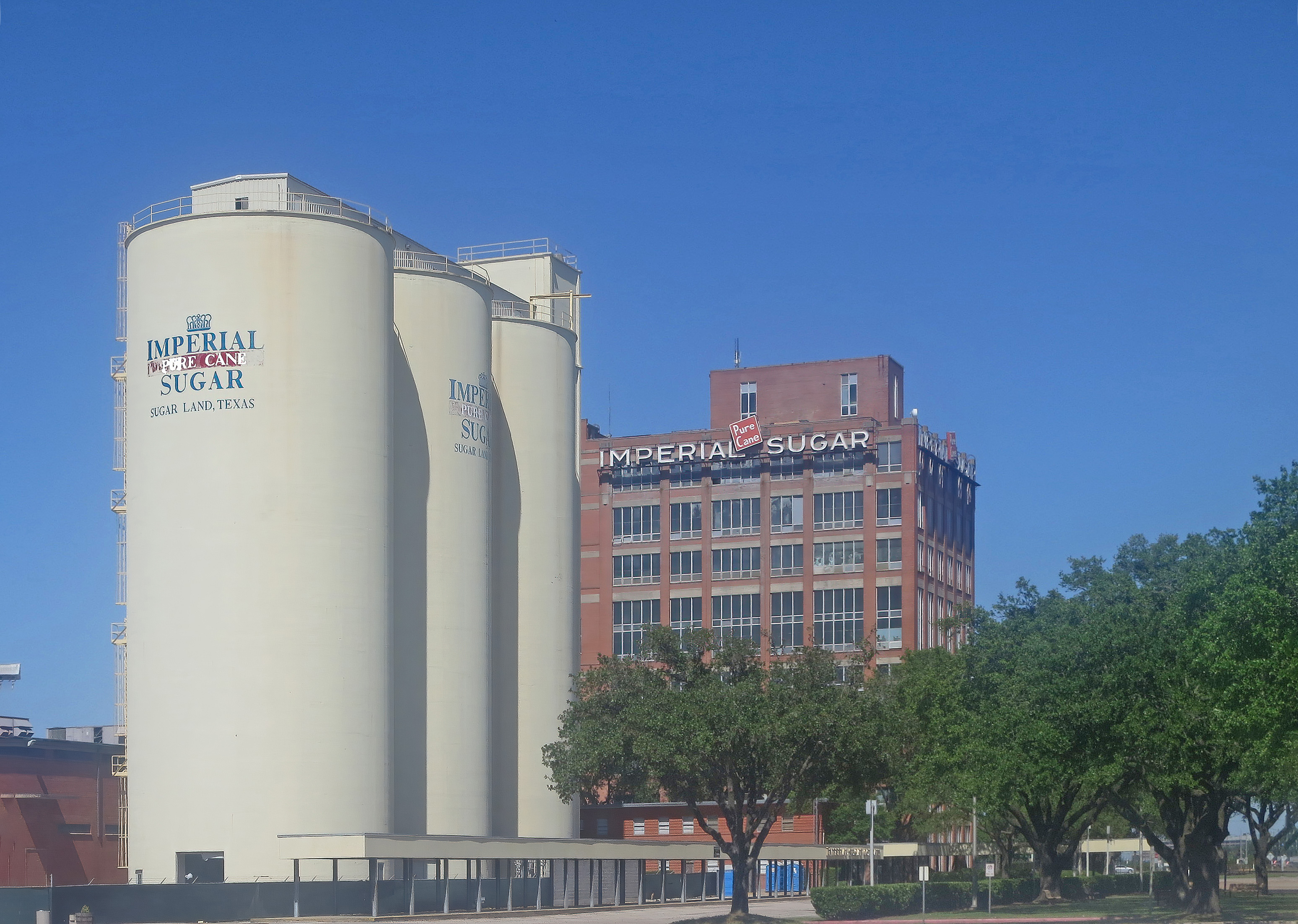
The former Sugar Land Refinery in Sugar Land

After Mexico achieved independence from Spain, Anglo-Americans started entering from the east. In 1822, a group of Stephen F. Austin's colonists, headed by William Travis, built a fort at the present site of Richmond. The fort was called Fort Bend because it was built in the bend of the Brazos River. The city of Richmond was incorporated under the Republic of Texas, along with 19 other towns, in 1837. Fort Bend County was created from parts of Austin, Harris, and Brazoria Counties in 1838.

Fort Bend developed a plantation economy based on cotton as the commodity crop. Planters had numerous African-American slaves as laborers. By the 1850s, Fort Bend was one of six majority-black counties in Texas. In 1860, the slave population totaled 4,127, more than twice that of the 2,016 whites. Few free Blacks lived there, as Texas refused them entry.

While the area began to attract White immigrants in the late 19th century, it remained majority-Black during and after Reconstruction. Whites endeavored to control freedmen and their descendants through violence and intimidation. Freedmen and their sympathizers supported the Republican Party because of emancipation, electing their candidates to office. The state legislature was still predominately White. By the 1880s, most White residents belonged to the Democratic Party. Factional tensions were fierce, as political elements split largely along racial lines. The Jaybirds, representing the majority of the Whites, struggled to regain control from the Woodpeckers, who were made up of some Whites who were consistently elected to office by the majority of African Americans, as several had served as Republican officials during Reconstruction.

Fort Bend County was the site of the Jaybird–Woodpecker War in 1888–89. After a few murders were committed, the political feud culminated in a gun battle at the courthouse on August 16, 1889, when several more people were killed and the Woodpeckers were routed from the county seat.

Governor Lawrence Sullivan Ross sent in militia forces and declared martial law. With his support, the Jaybirds ordered a list of certain Blacks and Woodpecker officials out of the county, overthrowing the local government. The Jaybirds took over county offices and established a "White-only pre-primary", disenfranchising African Americans from the only competitive contests in the county. This device lasted until 1950, when Willie Melton and Arizona Fleming won a lawsuit against the practice in United States District Court, though it was overturned on appeal. In 1953, they ultimately won their suit when the Supreme Court of the United States declared the Jaybird primary unconstitutional in Terry v. Adams, the last of the White primary cases.

=== 20th century to present ===
In the 1960s, the first of several master-planned communities that came to define the county were developed, marking the beginning of its transformation from a largely rural county dominated by railroad and oil and gas interests to a major suburban county dominated by service and manufacturing industries. Among the earliest such developments were Sugar Land's Sugar Creek and Missouri City's Quail Valley, whose golf course hosted the Houston Open during the 1973 and 1974 seasons of the PGA Tour. Another was First Colony in Sugar Land, a 9,700-acre development commenced in the 1970s by Houston developer Gerald D. Hines that eventually became the southwest Greater Houston area's main retail hub, anchored by First Colony Mall and Sugar Land Town Square.

Since the 1980s, new communities have continued to develop, with Greatwood, New Territory, and Sienna (originally Sienna Plantation) among the more recent notable developments. In addition to continued development in the eastern part of the county around Sugar Land and Missouri City, the Greater Katy area began to experience rapid growth and expansion into Fort Bend County in the 1990s, led by the development of Cinco Ranch. By 2010, the county's population exceeded 500,000, and it had become the second-largest county in the greater Houston area (behind Harris County).

In 2017, Hurricane Harvey caused significant flooding in Fort Bend County, leading to the evacuation of 200,000 residents and over 10,000 rescues. The unprecedented flooding, the result of record rainfall and overflow from the Brazos River and Barker Reservoir, resulted in damage to or destruction of over 6,800 homes in the county.

== Geography ==
According to the United States Census Bureau, the county has a total area of 885.250 square miles (2,292.79 km^{2}), of which 23.465 square miles (60.77 km^{2}) (2.65%) are covered by water. It is the 181st-largest of the 236 counties in Texas by total area.

=== Adjacent counties ===
- Waller County (north)
- Harris County (northeast)
- Brazoria County (southeast)
- Wharton County (southwest)
- Austin County (northwest)

== Communities ==
=== Cities (multiple counties) ===
- Houston (mostly in Harris County and a small part in Montgomery County)
- Katy (partly in Harris and Waller Counties)
- Missouri City (small part in Harris County)
- Pearland (mostly in Brazoria County and a small part in Harris County)
- Stafford (small part in Harris County)

=== Cities ===
- Arcola
- Beasley
- Fulshear
- Kendleton
- Meadows Place
- Needville
- Orchard
- Richmond (county seat)
- Rosenberg
- Simonton
- Sugar Land
- Weston Lakes

=== Town ===
- Thompsons

=== Villages ===
- Fairchilds
- Pleak

=== Census-designated places ===
- Cinco Ranch (small part in Harris County)
- Cumings
- Fifth Street
- Four Corners
- Fresno
- Greatwood
- Mission Bend (partly in Harris County)
- Pecan Grove
- Sienna

=== Former census-designated places ===
- Town West (Townwest)

=== Unincorporated communities ===
- Booth
- Clodine
- Crabb
- Foster
- Guy
- Juliff
- Long Point
- Powell Point
- Riverstone
- Tavener

=== Ghost towns ===
- Duke
- Pittsville

== Demographics ==
From 1930 to 1950, the county showed a decline in the rate of expansion and even a decrease in population. This was a period when many African Americans migrated in the second wave of the Great Migration from Texas and other parts of the South to the West Coast, where a buildup in the defense industry provided more job opportunities. Other minorities settled in the county during its residential development, and African Americans are now a minority.

Historical population
Census	Pop.	Note	%±
1850	2,533		—
1860	6,143		142.5%
1870	7,114		15.8%
1880	9,380		31.9%
1890	10,586		12.9%
1900	16,538		56.2%
1910	18,168		9.9%
1920	22,931		26.2%
1930	29,718		29.6%
1940	32,963		10.9%
1950	31,056		−5.8%
1960	40,527		30.5%
1970	52,314		29.1%
1980	130,846		150.1%
1990	225,421		72.3%
2000	354,452		57.2%
2010	585,375		65.1%
2020	822,779		40.6%
2025 (est.)	975,191	▲	18.5%
U.S. Decennial Census; 1850–1900 1910; 1920 1930 1940; 1950 1960 1970; 1980 1990 2000; 2010 2020

=== Recent estimates ===
As of the third quarter of 2024, the median home value in Fort Bend County was $395,730.

As of the 2023 American Community Survey, an estimated 281,259 households are in Fort Bend County, with an average of 3.04 persons per household. The county has a median household income of $113,409. About 8.5% of the county's population lives at or below the poverty line. Fort Bend County has an estimated 66.7% employment rate, with 49.3% of the population holding a bachelor's degree or higher and 91.9% holding a high-school diploma.

The top-five reported ancestries (people were allowed to report up to two ancestries, thus the figures will generally add to more than 100%) were English (57.2%), Spanish (18.3%), Indo-European (9.5%), Asian and Pacific Islander (11.9%), and other (3.0%). The median age in the county was 37.6 years.

=== Racial and ethnic composition ===
Fort Bend County, Texas – Racial and ethnic composition Note: the US Census treats Hispanic/Latino as an ethnic category. This table excludes Latinos from the racial categories and assigns them to a separate category. Hispanics/Latinos may be of any race.
Race / Ethnicity (NH = Non-Hispanic)	Pop 1980	Pop 1990	Pop 2000	Pop 2010	Pop 2020	% 1980	% 1990	% 2000	% 2010	% 2020
White alone (NH)	79,549	121,245	163,788	211,680	243,726	60.80%	53.79%	46.21%	36.16%	29.62%
Black or African American alone (NH)	20,132	45,678	69,579	123,267	167,964	15.39%	20.26%	19.63%	21.06%	20.41%
Native American or Alaska Native alone (NH)	276	411	621	1,159	1,269	0.21%	0.18%	0.18%	0.20%	0.15%
Asian alone (NH)	3,694	13,978	39,545	98,762	181,522	2.82%	6.20%	11.16%	16.87%	22.06%
Native Hawaiian or Pacific Islander alone (NH)	31	52	97	174	276	0.02%	0.02%	0.03%	0.03%	0.03%
Other race alone (NH)	508	217	165	1,341	4,055	0.39%	0.07%	0.15%	0.23%	0.49%
Mixed race or Multiracial (NH)	x	x	5,407	10,025	25,387	x	x	1.53%	1.71%	3.09%
Hispanic or Latino (any race)	26,656	43,892	74,871	138,967	198,580	20.37%	19.47%	21.12%	23.74%	24.14%
Total	130,846	225,421	354,452	585,375	822,779	100.00%	100.00%	100.00%	100.00%	100.00%

=== American Community Survey 2025 data ===
The United States Census Bureau estimated that in 2025, Fort Bend County’s population was 975,191. It was also estimated that the county's population was 26.41% Non-Hispanic White, 25.41% Hispanic or Latino, 21.42% Non-Hispanic Black, 23.64% Asian, 0.16% Native American, 0.05% Pacific Islander, and 2.92% Multiracial.

Total	Population	Percentage
Non-Hispanic White	257,582	26.41%
Hispanic or Latino	247,774	25.41%
Non-Hispanic Black	208,844	21.42%
Asian	230,507	23.64%
Native American	1,579	0.16%
Pacific Islander	474	0.05%
Non-Hispanic Multiracial	28,431	2.92%

=== 2020 census ===
As of the 2020 census, the county had a population of 822,779, 263,128 households, and 215,579 families. The median age was 37.1 years, 27.4% of residents were under the age of 18, and 12.1% were 65 years of age or older. For every 100 females there were 94.8 males, and for every 100 females age 18 and over there were 91.4 males age 18 and over.

Of those households, 45.5% had children under the age of 18 living in them, 63.4% were married-couple households, 11.4% were households with a male householder and no spouse or partner present, and 21.5% were households with a female householder and no spouse or partner present. About 15.3% of all households were made up of individuals and 5.8% had someone living alone who was 65 years of age or older.

The population density was 954.8 inhabitants per square mile (368.7/km^{2}), and the 277,910 housing units had an average density of 322.5 per square mile (124.5/km^{2}). Of those units, 5.3% were vacant, 77.1% of occupied housing units were owner-occupied, 22.9% were renter-occupied, the homeowner vacancy rate was 2.1%, and the rental vacancy rate was 8.6%.

The racial makeup of the county was 34.3% White, 20.78% Black or African American, 0.56% American Indian and Alaska Native, 22.18% Asian, 0.05% Native Hawaiian and Pacific Islander, 9.1% from some other race, and 13.0% from two or more races. Hispanic or Latino residents of any race comprised 24.14% of the population.

95.2% of residents lived in urban areas, while 4.8% lived in rural areas.

=== 2000 census ===
As of the 2000 census, 354,452 people, 110,915 households, and 93,057 families resided in the county. The population density was 405.0 inhabitants per square mile (156.4/km^{2}). The 115,991 housing units had an average density of 133.0 per square mile (51.4/km^{2}). The racial makeup of the county was 56.96% White, 19.85% African American, 0.30% Native American, 11.20% Asian, 9.14% from some other race, and 2.56% from two or more races. Hispanic or Latino people of any race were 21.12% of the population. Other self-identifications were 8.8% of German ancestry, 6.3% American, and 5.8% English ancestry.

Of the 110,915 households, 49.8% had children under 18 living with them, 68.8% were married couples living together, 11.4% had a female householder with no husband present, and 16.10% were not families. About 13.5% of all households were made up of individuals, and 3.10% had someone living alone who was 65 or older. The average household size was 3.14 and the average family size was 3.46.

In the county, the age distribution of the population was 32.0% under 18, 7.6% from 18 to 24, 32.3% from 25 to 44, 22.4% from 45 to 64, and 5.7% who were 65 or older. The median age was 33 years. For every 100 females, there were 99.1 males. For every 100 females 18 and over, there were 96.30 males.

The median income for a household in the county was $63,831, and that for a family was $69,781. Males had a median income of $47,979 versus $32,661 for females. The per capita income for the county was $24,985; 7.1% of the population and 5.5% of families were below the poverty line. Of the total population, 8.5% of those under 18 and 9.4% of those 65 and older were living below the poverty line.

=== Ethnic backgrounds ===
Since the 1970s, Fort Bend County has been attracting people from all ethnic backgrounds. According to a 2001 Claritas study, it was the fifth-most diverse U.S. county, among counties with a population of 100,000 or more.

It is one of a growing number of U.S. counties with no single ethnic group forming a majority of the population. Fort Bend County has the highest percentage of Asian-American residents in the Southern United States; the largest groups are of Vietnamese, Chinese, Indian, and Filipino ancestry. By 2011, Fort Bend was ranked the fourth-most racially diverse county in the United States by USA Today. The newspaper based the ranking on calculating the probability that two persons selected at random would be of different ethnic groups or races. According to the USA Today methodology, the chance of people of being two different ethnic groups/races being selected was 75%. Karl Eschbach, a former demographer with the State of Texas, has said that many people from Houston neighborhoods and communities with clear racial identities, such as the East End, Sunnyside, and the Third Ward, moved to suburban areas that were too new to have established racial identities. Eschbach explained, "[a]s a large minority middle class started to emerge, Fort Bend was virgin territory that all groups could move to."

In 2020, Fort Bend County had the highest percentage of Asian Americans of any county in Texas. In 2019, Indian Americans made up almost 50% of the Asian Americans in the county, with the second- and third-largest subsets being Chinese Americans and Vietnamese Americans. From 2010 to 2020, the percentage of non-Hispanic White residents declined by 4.8% (though this population grew in absolute numbers), the Asian-American community grew by 83,167 (83.7% increase), the percentage of Hispanic people increased by 42.9%, and the percentage of Black people increased by 35.9%. Fort Bend County also has the highest percentage of Filipino Americans in the Greater Houston area and in state of Texas. Filipinos are also the fourth-largest Asian subset in the county.

=== Economic characteristics ===
According to the 2008 American Community Survey, the median income for a household in the county was $81,456, and for a family was $90,171. Males had a median income of $54,139 versus $41,353 for females. The per capita income for the county was $30,862. About 5.5% of families and 7.1% of the population were below the poverty line, including 8.5% of those under 18 and 9.4% of those 65 or over.

As of 2006, Fort Bend County was the wealthiest county in Texas, with a median household income of $95,389 and a median family income of $105,944, having surpassed Collin and Rockwall Counties since the 2000 census. However, the Council for Community and Economic Research ranked Fort Bend County America's third-wealthiest county when the local cost of living was factored in. This estimate did not include property taxes and local taxes, as effective tax rates and home insurance were not measured. Along with other Texas counties, Fort Bend County has one of the nation's highest property-tax rates. In 2007, it was ranked fifth in the nation for property taxes as a percentage of the homes' value on owner-occupied housing. The list includes only counties with a population over 65,000. Fort Bend County also ranked in the top 100 in property taxes paid and percentage of taxes of income. Part of this is due to Texas's complex Robin Hood plan school financing law.

== Government and politics ==
United States presidential election results for Fort Bend County, Texas
Year	Republican		Democratic		Third party(ies)	
Year	No.	%	No.	%	No.	%
1912	276	24.86%	679	61.17%	155	13.96%
1916	329	28.86%	788	69.12%	23	2.02%
1920	0	0.00%	27	2.91%	902	97.09%
1924	356	15.82%	1,690	75.11%	204	9.07%
1928	631	26.77%	1,724	73.14%	2	0.08%
1932	148	4.53%	3,109	95.22%	8	0.25%
1936	176	6.34%	2,588	93.26%	11	0.40%
1940	748	19.43%	3,101	80.57%	0	0.00%
1944	442	11.11%	2,781	69.87%	757	19.02%
1948	1,016	28.12%	2,058	56.96%	539	14.92%
1952	3,974	55.00%	3,241	44.85%	11	0.15%
1956	3,779	59.83%	2,464	39.01%	73	1.16%
1960	3,301	42.81%	4,339	56.27%	71	0.92%
1964	3,493	36.01%	6,186	63.78%	20	0.21%
1968	4,573	39.72%	4,493	39.02%	2,448	21.26%
1972	10,475	69.42%	4,541	30.09%	73	0.48%
1976	17,354	60.28%	11,264	39.13%	169	0.59%
1980	25,366	66.25%	11,583	30.25%	1,337	3.49%
1984	41,370	68.71%	18,729	31.11%	110	0.18%
1988	39,818	62.43%	23,351	36.61%	615	0.96%
1992	41,039	46.62%	29,992	34.07%	17,000	19.31%
1996	49,945	53.79%	38,163	41.10%	4,748	5.11%
2000	73,567	59.56%	47,569	38.51%	2,373	1.92%
2004	93,625	57.38%	68,722	42.12%	822	0.50%
2008	103,206	50.89%	98,368	48.50%	1,248	0.62%
2012	116,126	52.91%	101,144	46.08%	2,219	1.01%
2016	117,291	44.76%	134,686	51.39%	10,089	3.85%
2020	157,718	44.01%	195,552	54.57%	5,063	1.41%
2024	173,592	47.88%	179,310	49.46%	9,622	2.65%

United States Senate election results for Fort Bend County, Texas1
Year	Republican		Democratic		Third party(ies)	
Year	No.	%	No.	%	No.	%
2024	159,691	44.84%	186,710	52.43%	9,740	2.73%

United States Senate election results for Fort Bend County, Texas2
Year	Republican		Democratic		Third party(ies)	
Year	No.	%	No.	%	No.	%
2020	160,977	46.33%	178,984	51.52%	7,478	2.15%
2026	115,973	34.94%	210,760	63.50%	5,160	1.55%

Texas Gubernatorial election results for Fort Bend County
Year	Republican		Democratic		Third party(ies)	
Year	No.	%	No.	%	No.	%
2022	117,249	46.89%	129,116	51.63%	3,701	1.48%
2026	126,059	37.94%	201,012	60.49%	5,217	1.57%

County politics in Fort Bend County, as in all Texas counties, center around a commissioners' court. It is composed of four popularly elected county commissioners, one representing each precinct drawn decennially on the basis of population, and a county judge elected to represent the entire county. Other county officials include a sheriff, district attorney, tax assessor-collector, county clerk, district clerk, county treasurer, and county attorney.

For decades, Fort Bend County was a stronghold for the Democratic Party, having achieved disenfranchisement of Blacks at the county level in 1889 in the aftermath of the Jaybird–Woodpecker War. The state effectively disfranchised them with a poll tax and White primaries; the latter device was declared unconstitutional in 1944. By 1960, so few Republicans resided in Fort Bend County that the county's Republican chair once received a letter addressed simply to "Mr. Republican".

As the 1960s progressed, though, rapid suburban-style development in west and southwest Houston began to overflow into Fort Bend County, where the development of numerous master-planned communities attracted many upper-middle-class families to developments in the eastern portion of the county. This development, along with the shift of conservative white Democrats towards the Republican Party in the wake of the Voting Rights Act of 1965, led to increased support for the GOP in the following years. Richard Nixon narrowly carried the county in 1968, making it the only county in greater Houston outside of Harris County to go Republican that year, and carried it again in 1972. In 1976, conservative physician Ron Paul of Brazoria County, noted for his opposition to most government programs, which earned him the nickname "Dr. No", captured the 22nd district in the United States House of Representatives in a special election, before narrowly losing re-election in the November election in which Gerald Ford also won Fort Bend, despite losing Texas to Jimmy Carter.

Beginning in 1978, Republicans began to win several offices within the county, with William P. Clements carrying the county in his successful run for governor. That same year, Paul was returned to Congress, while businessman Tom DeLay captured the county's seat in the Texas House of Representatives. In 1984 DeLay succeeded Paul in Congress after the latter ran an unsuccessful U.S. Senate campaign, and became House majority leader by 2002. Beginning in 1982, Republicans won a number of county-level offices and judicial benches, and Fort Bend County's new reputation as a Republican stronghold culminated in the 1994 election of a Republican county judge to the commissioners' court for the first time since Reconstruction. As of 2019, five of Fort Bend County's eight countywide offices, including two precinct-level positions, are held by Republicans. The remaining three are held by Democrats.

With growing populations of minorities and more socially moderate suburban voters who often break Republican on fiscal and economic issues, Fort Bend County has recently become more competitive. In 2008, Democrat Barack Obama came very close to winning the county, with 48.6% of the vote to Republican John McCain's 50.9%. In 2016, Hillary Clinton became the first Democrat to carry the county since Lyndon B. Johnson in 1964, largely due to the unpopularity of Republican nominee Donald Trump amongst the county's largely suburban electorate (not unlike the situation with other similarly suburban counties during the Trump era), with many voters splitting their tickets between Clinton and Republicans for other offices; Republicans won every elected countywide office by a margin similar to Clinton's, while also defeating an incumbent Democrat on the Fort Bend County Commissioners' Court. In 2018, significant enthusiasm for U.S. Senate candidate Beto O' Rourke and strong Democratic infrastructure resulted in Democratic control of the commissioners' court (including county judge) and a number of countywide administrative and judicial posts, with Fort Bend Independent School District board trustee K.P. George becoming Texas's first Asian-American county judge. The county would continue its Democratic trend in the 2020 election, with Joe Biden winning Fort Bend County over Trump by a margin of over 10 percent and Democrats sweeping all countywide races. In 2024, the diverse county swung slightly more Republican, with Vice President Kamala Harris only winning a narrow plurality over Trump and Republicans winning a majority of contested countywide and state judicial races.

Today, Fort Bend County is often considered a swing county, with election results usually tilting more Democratic than statewide results, which continue to favor Republicans. Elections within the county are often decided by margins in more Republican-leaning areas in Sugar Land, Rosenberg, and Sienna, with Republicans dominating in the Katy, Fulshear, and rural southern areas of the county and Democrats in the county's northeast corner around Missouri City and Fresno, as well as heavily Hispanic Mission Bend.

Fort Bend County is one of six "reverse pivot counties", counties that voted Republican in 2008 and 2012 before voting Democratic in 2016 onward.

Since the passage of the Voting Rights Act of 1965, the federal government has enforced it by regularly reviewing voting patterns and local practices, and plaintiffs have sometimes sued state or local governments over discriminatory practices. In April 2009, as part of a settlement with the United States Department of Justice, officials of Fort Bend County agreed to increase assistance to Spanish-speaking Latino voters in elections held in the county.

=== Commissioners' court ===
Commissioners	Name	Party	First Elected	Communities Represented
Judge	KP George	Republican	2018	Countywide
Precinct 1	Vincent Morales	Republican	2016	Arcola, Beasley, Fairchilds, Fresno, Greatwood, Needville, Orchard, Richmond, Rosenberg, Sienna Plantation
Precinct 2	Grady Prestage	Democratic	1990	eastern Stafford, most of Missouri City east of FM 1092, Meadows Place, Mission Bend
Precinct 3	Andy Meyers	Republican	1996	Cinco Ranch, Fulshear, Lakemont, Pecan Grove, Simonton, small portions of Sugar Land
Precinct 4	Dexter L. McCoy	Democratic	2022	Most of Sugar Land, Missouri City west of FM 1092, New Territory, Riverstone

=== County officials ===
Office	Name	Party
County Attorney	Bridgette Smith-Lawson	Democratic
County Clerk	Laura Richard	Republican
District Attorney	Brian Middleton	Democratic
District Clerk	Beverley McGrew Walker	Democratic
Sheriff	Eric Fagan	Democratic
Tax Assessor-Collector	Carmen Turner	Democratic
Treasurer	Bill Rickert	Republican

=== United States Congress ===
Senators	Name	Party	First Elected	Level
Senate Class 1	Ted Cruz	Republican	2012	Junior Senator
Senate Class 2	John Cornyn	Republican	2002	Senior senator
Representatives	Name	Party	First Elected	Area(s) of Fort Bend County Represented
District 7	Lizzie Fletcher	Democratic	2018	Mission Bend, Four Corners, western portions of Sugar Land, and unincorporated portions of the north-central part of the county
District 9	Al Green	Democratic	2004	Northeastern corner of the county, including Fresno and most of Stafford, Missouri City, and the county's portion of Houston
District 22	Troy Nehls	Republican	2020	Greater Katy areas, Fulshear, Richmond, Rosenberg, Sienna, eastern portion of Sugar Land, and southwestern Missouri City

=== Texas Legislature ===
==== Texas Senate ====
District	Name	Party	First Elected	Area(s) of Fort Bend County Represented
13	Borris Miles	Democratic	2016	Fresno, Fifth Street, most of Missouri City, the county's share of Pearland and Stafford, and most of the county's share of Houston
17	Joan Huffman	Republican	2008	Northwestern and southern areas of the county, including Fulshear, eastern portions of Sugar Land, and the county's share of Cinco Ranch and Katy
18	Lois Kolkhorst	Republican	2015 (special)	Central areas of the county, including Richmond, Rosenberg, Mission Bend, Pecan Grove, Four Corners, and western portions of Sugar Land

==== Texas House of Representatives ====
District	Name	Party	First Elected	Area(s) of Fort Bend County Represented
26	Matt Morgan	Republican	2024	Richmond, Pecan Grove, most of Cinco Ranch, some of Rosenberg and Katy, and other northern and central areas of the county
27	Ron Reynolds	Democratic	2010	Missouri City, Sienna Plantation, Fresno, Arcola, much of Stafford, and county's share of Houston
28	Gary Gates	Republican	2020	Western and southern areas of county including Fulshear, most of Rosenberg and much of Sugar Land
76	Suleman Lalani	Democratic	2022	Northern areas of county including Meadows Place, Four Corners, and some of Sugar Land, Stafford and Mission Bend
85	Stan Kitzman	Republican	2022	Southern fringe of the county, including Thompsons and Kendleton; district also includes Austin, Colorado, Fayette, Waller and Wharton counties

=== Corrections ===
The Fort Bend County Jail is at 1410 Richmond Parkway in Richmond.

Texas Department of Criminal Justice operates the following facilities in Fort Bend County, all at the Jester State Prison Farm site:

Prisons for men:

- Jester III Unit (unincorporated area) (co-located with the Jester units)
- Carol Vance Unit (unincorporated area) (co-located with the Jester units)

Other facilities:

- Jester I Unit – Substance Abuse Felony Punishment Facility (unincorporated area) (co-located with the Jester units)
- Wayne Scott Unit (formerly Jester IV Unit) – Psychiatric Facility (unincorporated area) (co-located with the Jester units), renamed in 2021

The TDCJ announced that the Central Unit in Sugar Land was closing in 2011. The City of Sugar Land is exploring the property for future economic development, including light industrial uses, as well as a potential expansion of Sugar Land Regional Airport.

=== County buildings ===
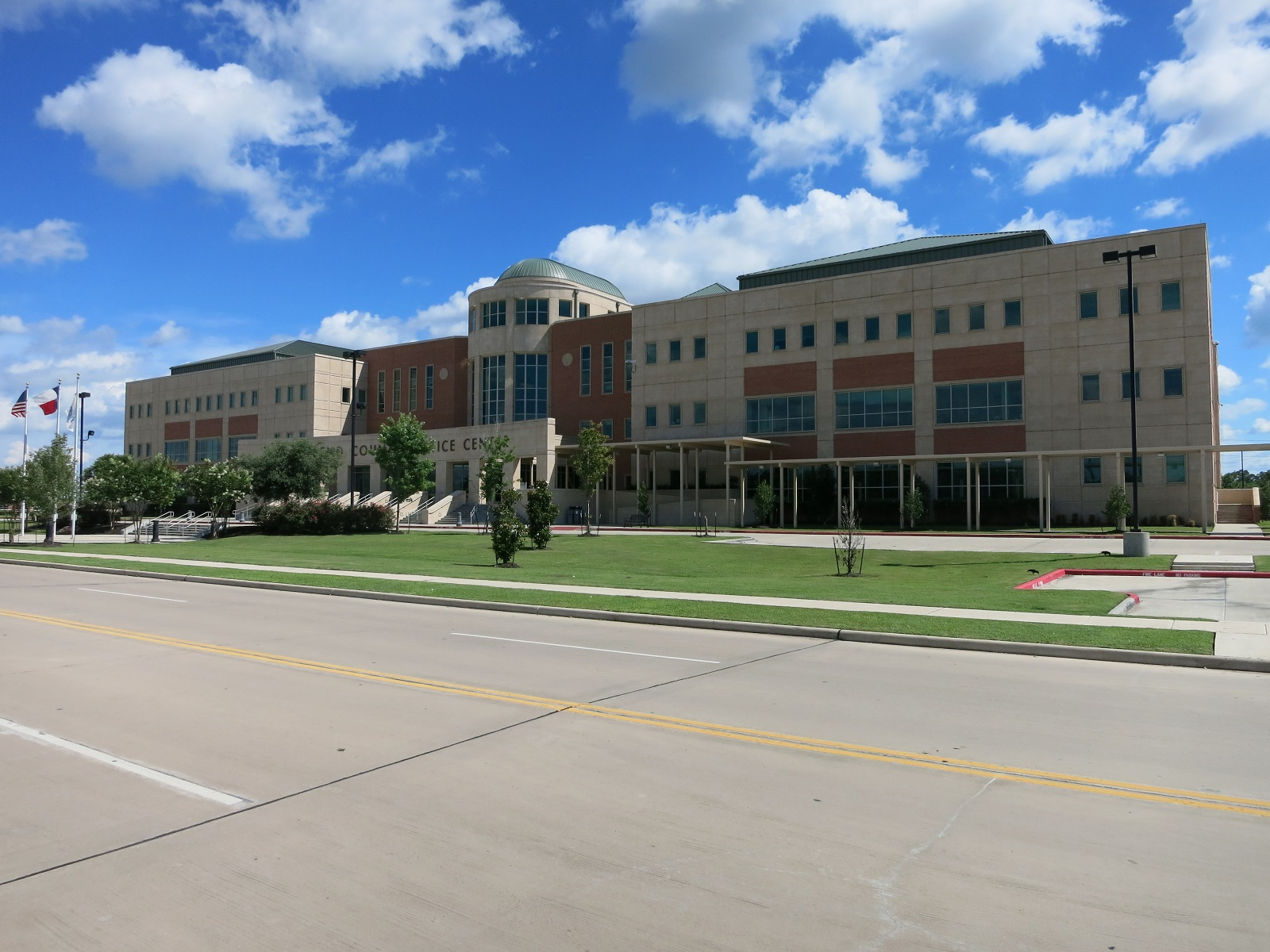
Fort Bend County Justice Center at 1422 Eugene Heimann Cir.

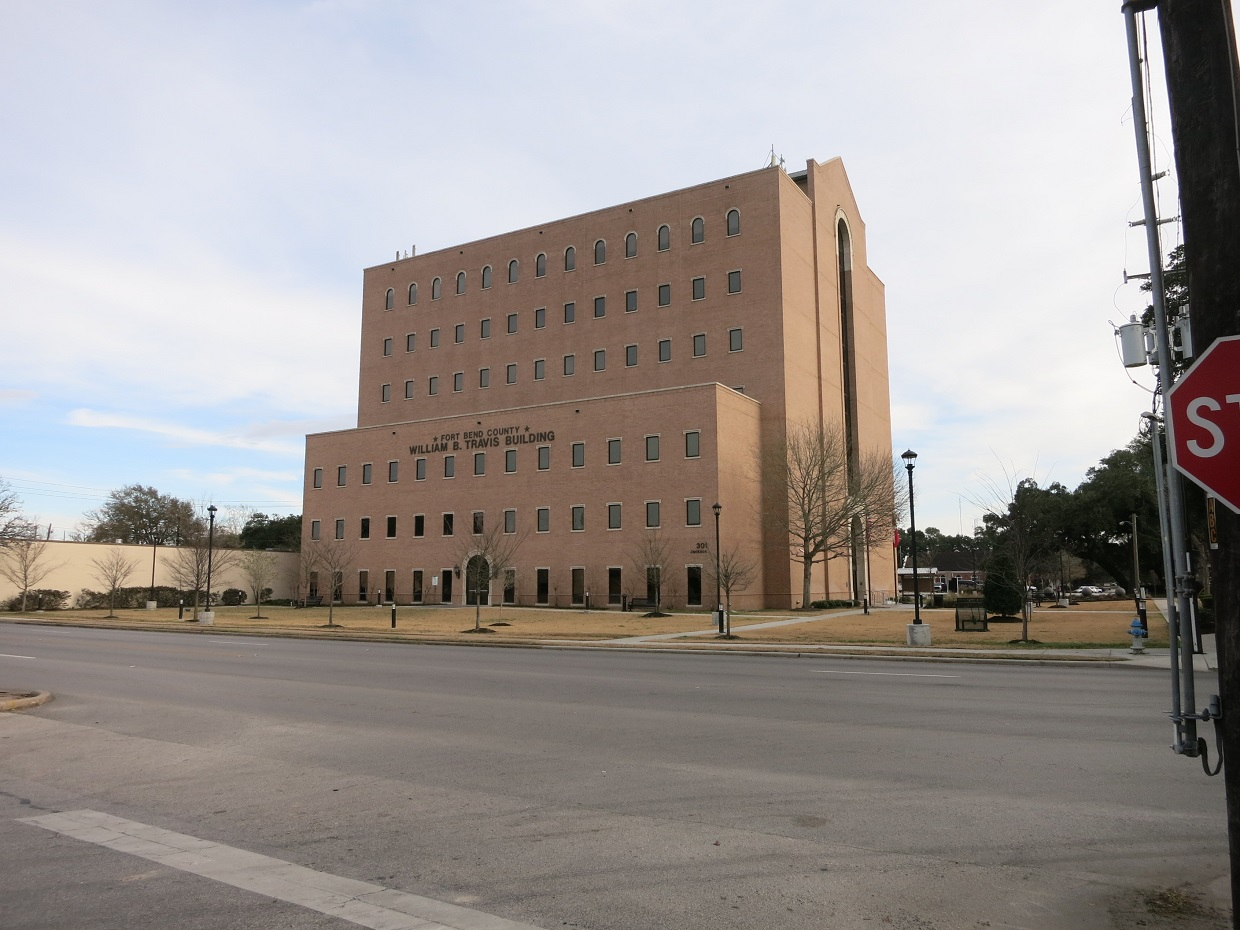
William B. Travis Building is just east of the courthouse.

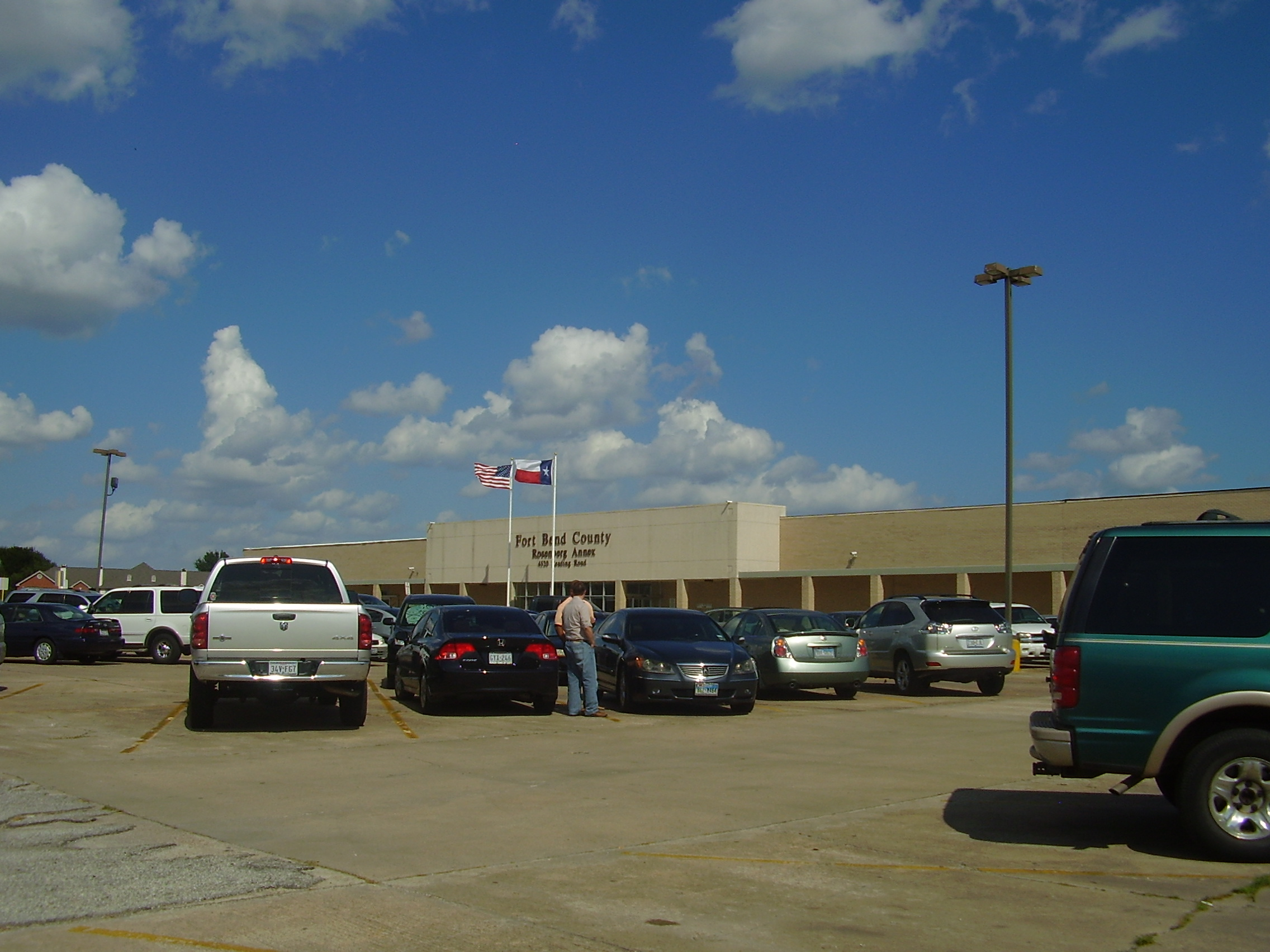
Fort Bend County Rosenberg Annex

== Economy ==
In contrast to greater Houston in general, Fort Bend County's economy is more diverse, with numerous service-sector jobs in healthcare, energy, education, hospitality, and other areas. Major companies with a presence in the county include Schlumberger, Minute Maid, Fluor, Applied Optoelectronics and Sunoco's logistics operations in Sugar Land. The Houston Business Journal reported in 2010 that the diversity of industries promoted decades of rapid population growth. After Memorial Hermann Hospital and St. Luke's Episcopal Hospital opened facilities in Fort Bend County, already home to local facilities for Houston Methodist Hospital in Sugar Land, as well as locally based OakBend Medical Center in Richmond, many doctors moved their offices to the county. Compared to Montgomery County, which has experienced rapid growth in corporate employment following ExxonMobil's decision to move its greater Houston operations to an area directly south of The Woodlands, Fort Bend County has yet to experience significant corporate growth, though Schlumberger recently announced plans to move its North American headquarters to Sugar Land.

== Healthcare and animal services ==
The county does not have a hospital district. OakBend Medical Center serves as the county's charity hospital, with which the county contracts.

Fort Bend County maintains its animal shelter in Rosenberg. The cities of Katy, Missouri City, and Sugar Land operates their own animal shelters. The City of Houston animal shelter, the Bureau of Animal Regulation and Care (BARC), is in Harris County. Pearland's animal shelter is in Brazoria County.

== Education ==
=== Public school districts ===
School districts in the county include:

- Brazos Independent School District (formerly Wallis-Orchard ISD)
- Fort Bend Independent School District
- Katy Independent School District
- Lamar Consolidated Independent School District
- Needville Independent School District
- Stafford Municipal School District

Kendleton Independent School District, which formerly served parts of the county, closed in 2010 and merged into LCISD.

=== Higher education ===
- University of Houston Sugar Land campus

The Texas Legislature assigns these community college districts to the following:

- Houston Community College System: Katy ISD, Stafford MSD, and portions of FBISD in the Houston, Missouri City, and Pearland city limits, and areas not in Wharton County Junior College (in other words, not in Sugar Land, not in Sugar Land's extraterritorial jurisdiction)
- Wharton County Junior College: The City of Sugar Land and its extraterritorial jurisdiction, Lamar CISD (including the former Kendleton ISD), Needville ISD, and Brazos ISD (stated in the legislation as Wallis-Orchard)

=== Technical school ===
- Texas State Technical College

=== Libraries ===
Fort Bend County Libraries operates many libraries in the county.

Houston Public Library operates one branch in the county, the Stimley Blue Ridge Neighborhood Library in Blue Ridge, Houston.

== Media ==
Local newspapers in the county include three weeklies: the Fort Bend Star, headquartered in Stafford; the Fort Bend Independent; and the Fort Bend Sun, headquartered in Sugar Land. The daily Fort Bend Herald and Texas Coaster focuses on news coverage in the Richmond-Rosenberg area. Fort Bend County is also a major service area for the Houston Chronicle, which provides separate local coverage for the Sugar Land and Katy areas.

== Transportation ==
=== Major highways ===
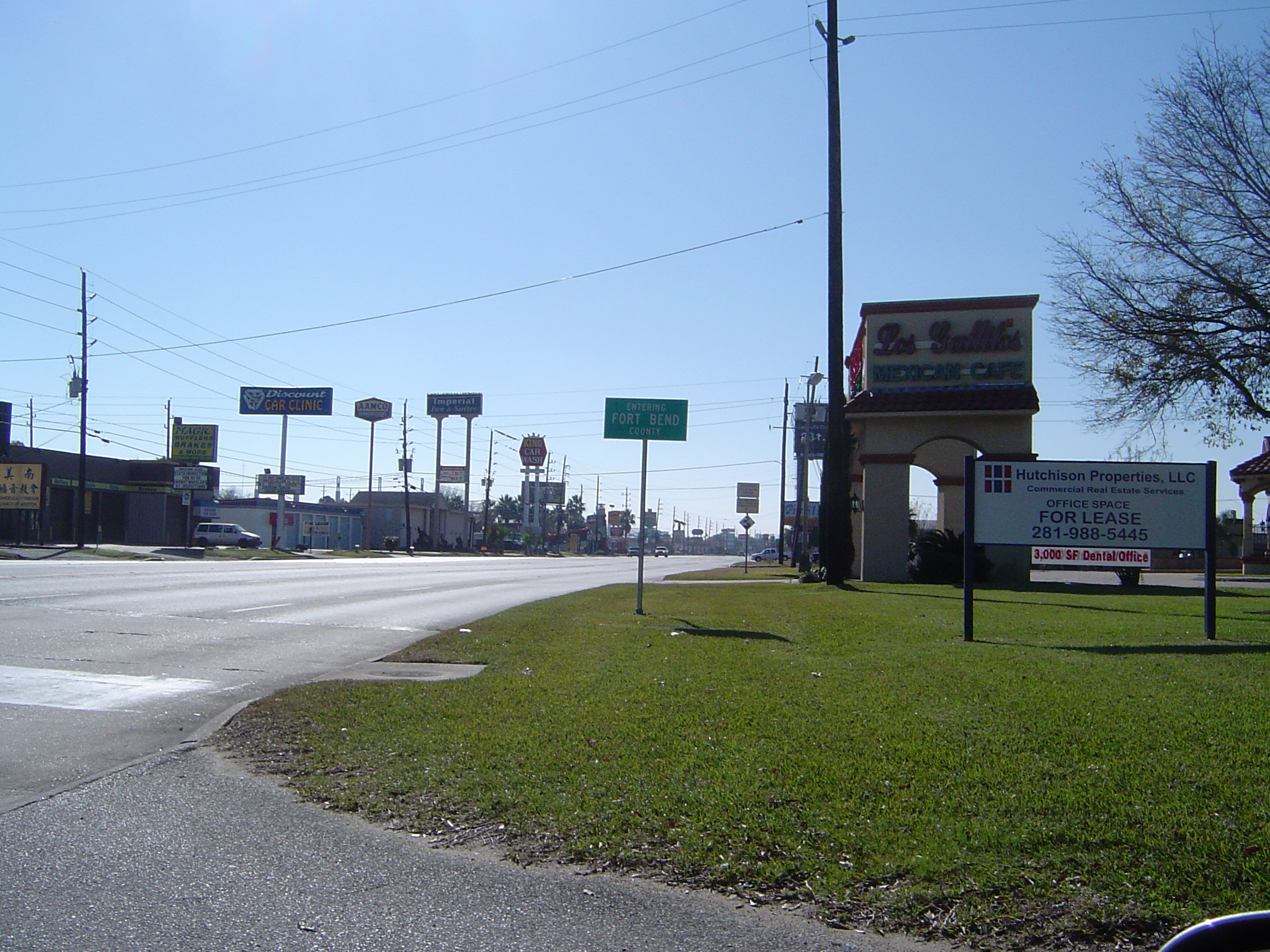
Farm to Market Road 1092, a major entry into the county

- Interstate 10
- Interstate 69
- U.S. Route 59
- U.S. Route 90
- U.S. Route 90 Alternate
- State Highway 6
- State Highway 36
- State Highway 99 — Grand Parkway (Under Construction)
- Spur 10
- Spur 529
- Loop 540
- Loop 541
- Fort Bend Parkway
- Westpark Tollway

=== Major Farm to Market Roads ===
- Farm to Market Road 359
- Farm to Market Road 442
- Farm to Market Road 521
- Farm to Market Road 762
- Farm to Market Road 1092
- Farm to Market Road 1093
- Farm to Market Road 1462
- Farm to Market Road 1463
- Farm to Market Road 1464
- Farm to Market Road 1876
- Farm to Market Road 2234
- Farm to Market Road 2759
- Farm to Market Road 2977
- Farm to Market Road 3345

=== Airports ===
The sole publicly owned airport in the county is Sugar Land Regional Airport in Sugar Land.

Privately owned airports for public use include:

- Houston Fort Bend Airport in an unincorporated area east of Beasley
- Houston Southwest Airport in Arcola
- Westheimer Air Park in an unincorporated area between Fulshear and Houston

Privately owned for private use:

- Cardiff Brothers Airport in an unincorporated area near Fulshear and Katy
- Dewberry Heliport is a general-aviation heliport (privately owned, for private use) in unincorporated areas between Fulshear and Katy.

The closest airport with regularly scheduled commercial service is Houston's William P. Hobby Airport in Harris County. Fort Bend County is also within the primary service area of George Bush Intercontinental Airport in Houston.

=== Mass transit ===
Fort Bend County officially created a department of public transportation in 2005 that provides commuter buses to Uptown, Greenway Plaza, and Texas Medical Center. It also provides demand-and-response buses to senior citizens and the general public that travel only in Fort Bend County. Parts of the county, such as Katy and Missouri City, participate in the Metropolitan Transit Authority of Harris County and are served by several park-and-ride routes.

=== Freeway system ===
The TTC-69 component (recommended preferred) of the once-planned Trans-Texas Corridor went through Fort Bend County.

=== Toll roads ===
The Fort Bend County Toll Road Authority in Sugar Land manages and operates tolled portions of these toll roads operating in the county:

- Fort Bend Parkway
- Westpark Tollway
- Grand Parkway Toll Road

== Notable people ==
- Brittney Karbowski, American voice actress
- CeeDee Lamb, Wide Receiver for the Dallas Cowboys

== See also ==
- List of museums in the Texas Gulf Coast
- National Register of Historic Places listings in Fort Bend County, Texas
- Recorded Texas Historic Landmarks in Fort Bend County
