= Kempner =

Kempner may refer to:

== People ==
- Alan H. Kempner (1897–1985), American stockbroker and rare books collector, son-in-law of Carl Loeb who founded Loeb, Rhoades & Co.
- Alicia Kempner, American bridge player
- Aubrey J. Kempner (1880–1973), British mathematician
- Aviva Kempner (born 1946), American filmmaker
- Friederike Kempner (1836–1904), Polish-German Jewish poet and writer
- Harris Kempner (b. 1837) (1837–1894), Polish-American merchant in Galveston, Texas
- Harris L. Kempner (1903–1987), American businessman
- Isaac Herbert Kempner (1873–1967), founder of the Imperial Sugar Corporation and mayor of Galveston, Texas
- Lydia Rabinowitsch-Kempner (1871–1935), American physician
- Michael Kempner, the founder, chairman, president and CEO of independent public relations and marketing firm MWW Group in New Jersey, USA
- Nan Kempner (1930–2005), New York City socialite, famous for dominating society events, shopping, charity work and fashion
- Patty Kempner (born 1942), retired medley and breaststroke swimmer from the United States, and 1960 Olympic gold medallist
- Robert Kempner (1899–1993), German-born American lawyer
- Scott Kempner (1954–2023), the rhythm guitarist with The Dictators since they formed in 1974
- S. Marshall Kempner (1898–1987), American investment banker and founder of the French Bank of California, brother-in-law of Peggy Guggenheim
- Suzanna Kempner (born 1985), English actress, singer and stand-up comedian who studied at the Royal Academy of Music
- Vitka Kempner (1920–2012), Lithuanian-Jewish partisan leader in World War II
- William Kempner (born 2001), American baseball player

== Other uses ==
- Kempner, Texas, city in Lampasas County, Texas, United States
- Kempner High School, public high school in Sugar Land, Texas, USA and a part of the Fort Bend Independent School District
- Kempner series, modification of the harmonic series, formed by omitting all terms whose denominator expressed in base 10 contains a 9 digit
