= Craig Brown (mayor) =

Craig Brown (mayor) may refer to:

- Craig K. Brown (born c. 1946), American mayor of Galveston
- Craig Brown (New Zealand politician) (c. 1947–2020), New Zealand local-body politician
