= Isaac Herbert Kempner Jr. =

American businessman and philanthropist

Isaac Herbert Kempner Jr. (1906-1953) was an American businessman and philanthropist. Kempner served as the president of Imperial Sugar.

== Early life and education ==
Kempner was born to Isaac Herbert Kempner and Henrietta Blum Kempner in Galveston, Texas on October 1, 1906. He graduated from Morristown School (now Morristown-Beard School) in Morristown, New Jersey in 1924. Kempner then earned his bachelor's degree in business at Harvard University in Cambridge, Massachusetts in 1928. His older brother, businessman Harris L. Kempner, also graduated from both schools. In 1953, the Harris and Eliza Kempner Fund established the I. H. Kempner, Jr. Scholarship Endowment at Harvard to honor Kempner's legacy.

== Industry career ==
Kempner served as the vice president and treasurer of Imperial Sugar. In 1948, Imperial Sugar named him as their president. While serving in that role, Kempner oversaw a campaign to modernize Imperial Sugar's business activities. He launched a $4 million expansion that sought to tap into the high demand for sugar following the end of World War II. Kempner led work to improve the quality of housing for nonwhite residents in the company town of Sugar Land; he led their Belknap realty company to offer lots to both employees and non-employees. He also established the company's recognition for labor unions.

During his career, Kempner served as the president of Fort Bend County's utility company and Galveston's stevedoring company. He also served as a trustee of Sugar Land Industries and as a member of the Board of Directors of the U.S. Sugar Cane Refiners Association.

== Military service ==
Kempner held a membership in the Army and Navy Club of Washington, D.C. During World War II, he served with the U.S. Navy, and he rose to the rank of lieutenant commander. Kempner worked as a contract negotiator, and then served as chief of the Negotiation Unit of the Bureau of Ordnance. In 1942, the Navy awarded Kempner the Legion of Merit.

== Legacy ==
The Kempner Family Papers at Rosenberg Library in Galveston, Texas contain the personal papers of Kempner. The collection also includes papers from his son, Isaac Herbert Kempner III, his father, and his mother.
