= Harris L. Kempner =

American businessman (1903–1987)

Harris Leon Kempner
- Born: October 3, 1903; Galveston, Texas, U.S.
- Died: January 1, 1987 (aged 83); Texas, U.S.
- Spouse: Ruth Levy Kempner
- Parent(s): Isaac Herbert Kempner, Henrietta Blum Kempner
- Relatives: Harris Kempner, grandfather

Harris Leon Kempner (1903–1987) was an American businessman and philanthropist from Texas. While leading family business interests in cotton and sugar, he supported urban renewal and anti-poverty efforts in Galveston, Texas.

== Early life and education ==
Kempner was born to Isaac Herbert Kempner and Henrietta Blum Kempner in Galveston, Texas on October 3, 1903. After attending public schools in Galveston, he completed his secondary education at the Morristown School in Morristown, New Jersey in 1920. Kempner then graduated cum laude from Harvard University in Cambridge, Massachusetts. Following his lead, his younger brother, businessman Isaac Herbert Kempner Jr., graduated from both schools. In 1924, Kempner completed his postgraduate studies at the Sorbonne in Paris, France. During his studies, he served as the manager of the Harvard Crimson golf team. He also played on the tennis team.

== Cotton and sugar industries ==
Kempner chaired the Board of Directors of his family's business, Imperial Sugar. His long-term engagement in the H. L. Kempner Company, the family cotton company founded by his grandfather, began when he graduated from college. For several decades, Kempner helped lead activities at the company focused on the export of cotton to worldwide companies; recognizing his efforts, he rose to the position of president.

During his career, Kempner held leadership positions in the cotton industry at the national, state, and regional levels. He served as the president and vice president of the American Cotton Shippers Association. Through these roles, Kempner advocated in Washington D.C. for efforts to free cotton distribution from above-market non-recourse government loans. He also served on the board of directors of the Galveston Cotton Exchange, the Texas Cotton Exchange, and the New Orleans Cotton Exchange. While serving as the Galveston Cotton Exchange's president, Kempner advocated for changes in U.S. tariff policies. He believed that the Smoot-Hawley Tariff Act was fueling economic decline.

== Civic and humanitarian roles ==
Kempner contributed to urban renewal and community development in Galveston through multiple roles. He chaired Citizens for Urban Renewal and the Human Rights Commission in Galveston. Through the former role, he advocated for initiatives to improve housing and urban development. Through the latter role, he led efforts to integrate Galveston's businesses. Kempner also chaired the Galveston County Cultural Arts Council, and he volunteered with Rosenberg Library and the local chapters of Boy Scouts of America and the United Way. In 1981, the People of Vision Dinner honored this work and presented him with an award to recognize his philanthropy.

== Military service ==
In 1942, Kempner moved to Washington, D.C. to work for the U.S. Navy. He served in the office of the Undersecretary of the Navy for three years. During this period, Kempner rose in rank from lieutenant to commander, and the Navy awarded him the Legion of Merit.

== Family ==
Kempner married Ruth Levy Kempner on April 24, 1939, a few months after they dated during Mardi Gras. After Galveston elected Ruth Kempner to City Council in 1961, she became the first woman to serve on a governing body of the city. Kempner also served as president of the Family Services Council in Galveston and as a member of the Texas Judicial Council. In 1947, she chaired the Disaster Relief Committee of the American Red Cross during the Texas City Disaster, the largest industrial disaster in American history.

== Honors and legacy ==
In 1976, the Mental Health Association in Galveston honored Kempner for his spirit of giving. The Boys Club of Galveston awarded Kemper their Man of the Year award in 1986.

In 1982, the University of Texas Medical Branch (UTMB) at Galveston established the H. L. Kemper Award in honor of Kempner's support for the hospital. He was also the first recipient of the award. The Kempner Award honors outstanding contributions to support the recruitment and retention of medical students from minority racial/ethnic backgrounds. UTMB annually presented the award at the Harris L. Kempner Award Banquet honoring graduating seniors from minority racial/ethnic backgrounds.
