= John Melville Allen =

Naval volunteer and first mayor of Galveston, Texas

John Melville Allen (c. 1798 – February 12, 1847) was an American soldier and the first Mayor of Galveston, Texas.

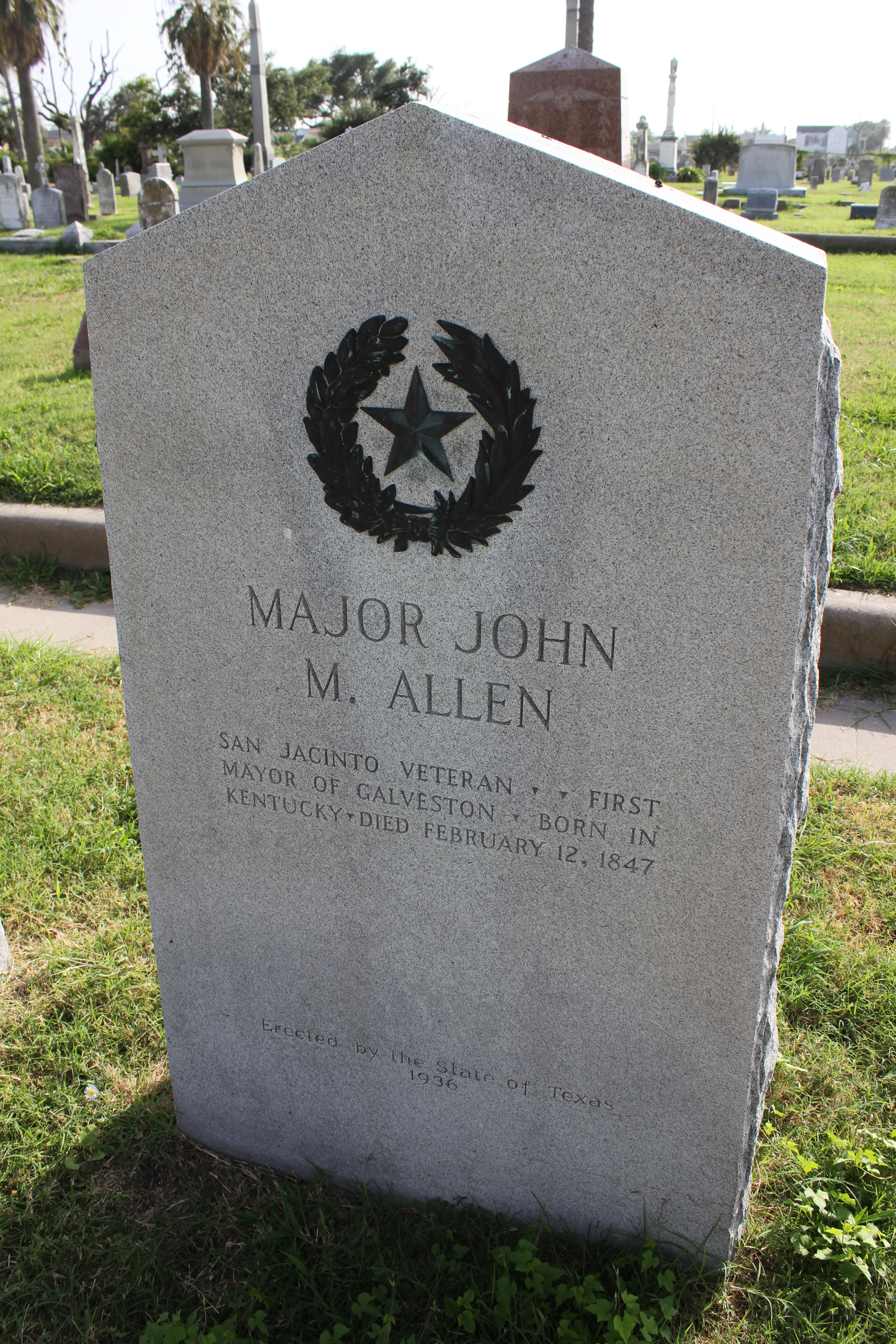
Historical marker (cenotaph) for Allen

John Melville Allen was born in Kentucky. He enlisted in the United States Navy at an early age. He fought in support of Greek independence from the Ottoman Empire after resigning from the Navy. The Lord Byron died in Allen's presence at Missolonghi. He volunteered with the Texians, first with the Tampico Expedition in 1835, and with the Texian Army after he returned from Mexico late in the year. He received a commission as captain of an infantry unit and was a participant in the Battle of San Jacinto. He assumed command of a naval ship after independence and headed a recruiting mission in the United States until his release from service on December 2, 1836. The Republic of Texas granted to him a league and labor for his military service.

Allen was the first mayor of Galveston, Texas, and was elected for the post first in 1839. He was mayor for three non-consecutive periods, his last term ending in 1846. He became a party to a charter war in 1840 when he transported the Galveston archives to his home. He withstood a challenge by Samuel May Williams and other persons with financial interests in the Galveston City Company. Allen commandeered two cannons to guard his home and the municipal archives, though they were returned to the city and Allen resumed his term as mayor.

Allen served as a United States Marshall from 1846 until his death the next year.
