= United States National Bank of Galveston =

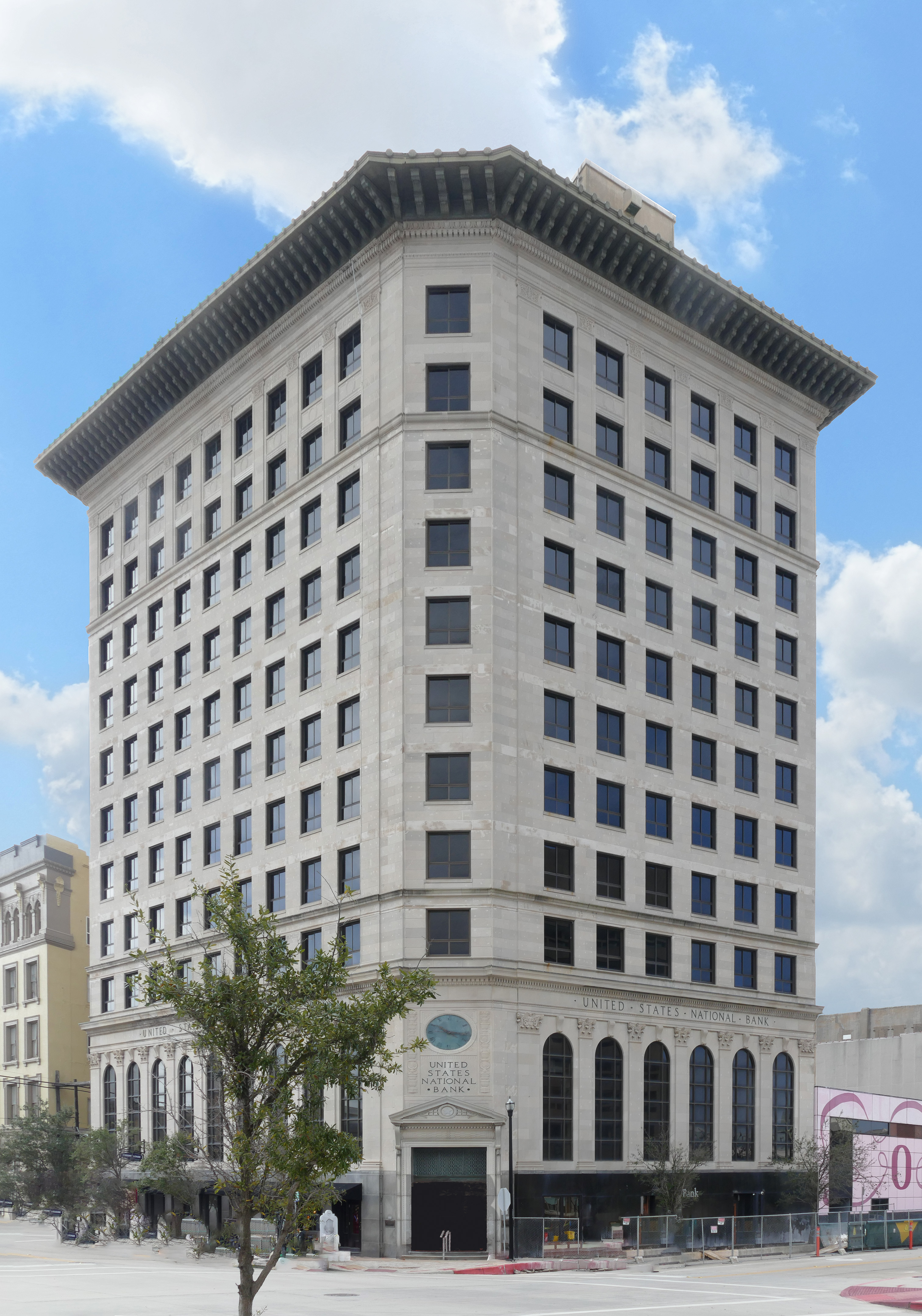
- U.S. National Bank building in 2020
- Industry: Finance and Insurance
- Founded: 1874
- Headquarters: 2201 Ave. D, Galveston, Texas, United States
- Products: Banking
- U.S. National Bank
- U.S. National Register of Historic Places
- Location within Texas Location within the United States
- Coordinates: 29°18′19″N 94°47′34″W
- Area: less than one acre
- Built: 1923
- Architect: Multiple
- Architectural style: Late 19th and 20th Century Revivals
- MPS: Central Business District MRACentral Business District MRA
- NRHP reference No.: 84001739
- Added to NRHP: August 14, 1984

The United States National Bank of Galveston [USNB] was a federally chartered bank in Galveston, Texas. It was founded in 1874 and was merged into Frost National Bank in 2000. It was the last of 33 banks chartered in the US that used the forbidden title "United States" in its name.

== History ==
The bank was founded in 1874 by the Kempner family as Island City Savings Bank. In 1902 the decision was made to rename the bank the Texas Bank & Trust Company. Finally, on December 31, 1923 the bank would receive its last name, United States National Bank.

The Galveston bank would be the last to be chartered using this name, as in 1926 the United States Congress banned the use of the words "Reserve", "United States" and "Federal" in bank titles. Under a grandfather clause, banks that already had titles incorporating those words were allowed to keep them.

On May 3, 1982, Cullen/Frost Bankers, Inc. issued shares of common and redeemable preferred stock for all of the outstanding preferred and common stock of United States National Bancshares, Inc. and Galbank, Inc. which together owned all of the capital stock of United States National Bank of Galveston and Sugar Land State Bank.

Afterwards Cullen/Frost Bankers, Inc. continued to operate United States National Bank (USNB) separately from its flagship Frost National Bank for nearly two decades. As new financial services legislation allowed banks to broaden the services they offered customers, Cullen/Frost folded the USNB charter into Frost's in 2000. With this action, the last bank using the federally forbidden United States National Bank title ceased to exist.

DMX filmed the music video for Party Up (Up in Here) at the building.

== See also ==
- Isaac Herbert Kempner
- National Register of Historic Places listings in Galveston County, Texas
