= Jan Coggeshall =

Former mayor of Galveston, Texas

Mayor of Galveston, Texas
- In office 1984–1989
- Preceded by: Elias "Gus" Manuel
- Succeeded by: Barbara Krantz Crews

Member of the Galveston City Council
- In office 1979–1984

Personal details
- Born: Janice Reddig; June 27, 1935 Maplewood, New Jersey, U.S.
- Died: June 19, 2017 (aged 81) Galveston, Texas
- Education: Wellesley College

Janice Reddig Coggeshall (June 27, 1935 – June 19, 2017) was an American politician who served as the 49th mayor of Galveston, Texas, from 1984 to 1989.

== Early life and education ==
Coggeshall was born in 1935 in Maplewood, New Jersey, the daughter of James Clendenin Reddig and Geraldine Baddenoch Reddig. Her father was an insurance agent. She was raised in Rochester, New York, and graduated from Irondequoit High School in Rochester. She earned a degree in mathematics from Wellesley College in 1957.

== Career ==
Janice Reddig Coggeshall worked at the National Security Agency in Washington, D.C., after college. She moved to Galveston, Texas in 1971. She was president of the Galveston League of Women Voters from 1975 to 1977 and chaired the league's Design of the City Committee. Coggeshall was elected to the Galveston city council in 1979, her first elected position. Five years later, she was elected the first female mayor of Galveston. She chaired the National Conference of Women Mayors from 1987 to 1989, and was an active member of the United States Conference of Mayors. She chaired the state Oil Spill Committee, and on an advisory committee of FEMA. After politics, she worked as a financial advisor at Merrill Lynch.

Coggeshall was a board member of the Galveston Ethics Board for two and a half decades, and she served for the same length of time on the Galveston Housing Finance Corporation. She volunteered for education groups, co-founding the Galveston College Foundation. She was president of the board of trustees for Galveston’s Rosenberg Library in 2003.

Coggeshall was inducted into the Galveston Women's Hall of Fame in 1984.

== Personal life and legacy ==
Coggeshall married surgeon Richard E. Coggeshall in 1958. They had four children. She died from cancer in 2017, at the age of 81, in Galveston. The Rosenberg Library Museum has her files from her time as mayor, and her ERA bracelet. A live oak on the grounds of the library was dedicated to Coggeshall's memory in 2018.
