= Telfair, Sugar Land, Texas =

Planned community in Texas, United States

Telfair
- Community in Sugar Land, Texas
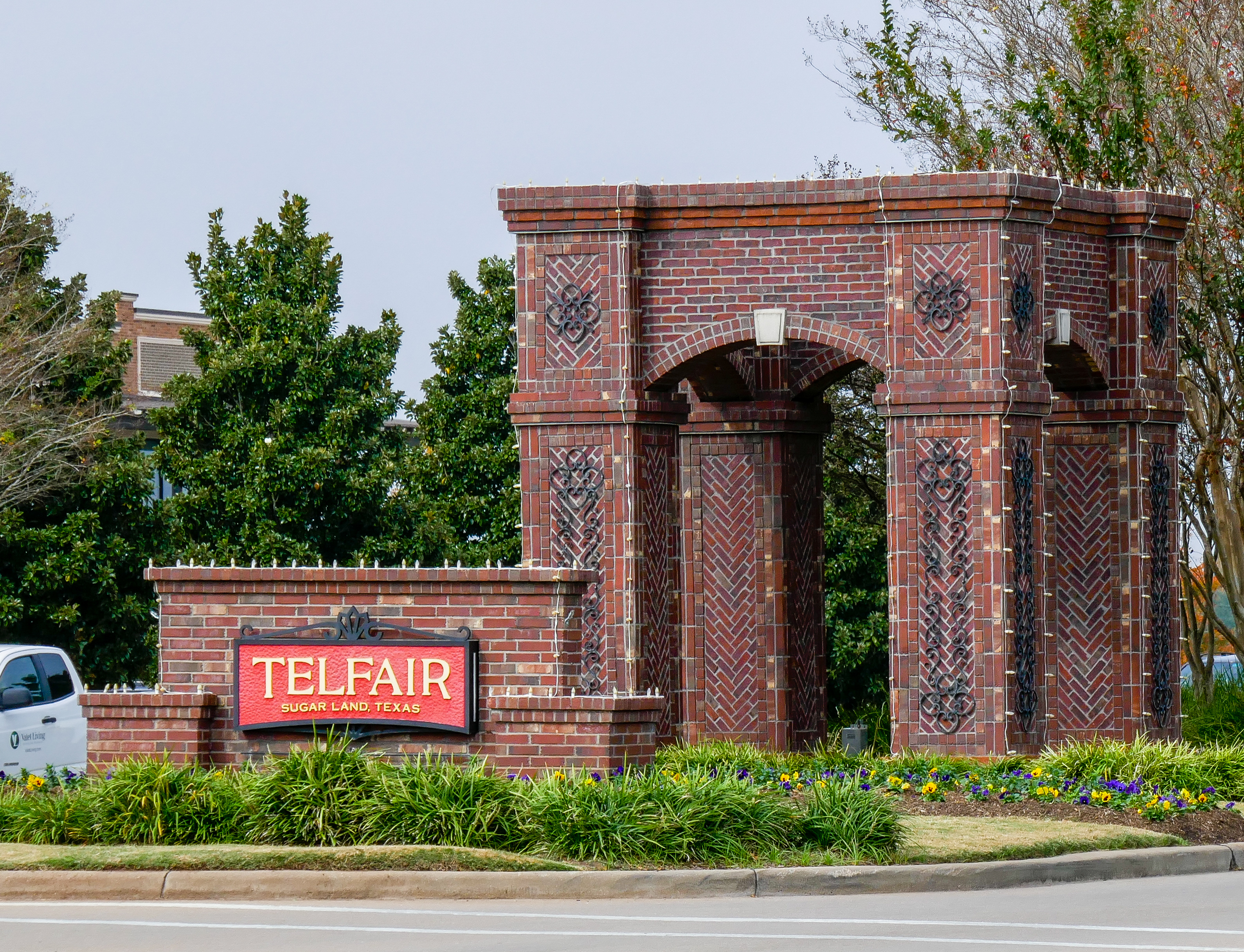
- Telfair entrance, University Blvd

- Interactive map of Telfair
- Coordinates: 29°35′36″N 95°39′16″W
- Country: United States
- State: Texas
- County: Fort Bend County
- City: Sugar Land, Texas
- Land sold to Newland Communities: 2002
- Construction started: February 2005
- Date of opening: Spring of 2006
- Founder: Newland Communities

Area
  - Total: 2,018 acres (817 ha)

Population
  - Total: 10,634
  - Density: 3,375.87/sq mi (1,303.43/km^{2})
- ZIP Code: 77479

Telfair is a 2,018-acre (817 ha) planned community located in Sugar Land, Texas, United States. It is built on former prison land (including a cemetery) which had been the property of the Central Prison Unit of the State of Texas.

== History ==
In 2002, the State of Texas sold a parcel of land from the Texas Department of Criminal Justice Central Prison Unit to Newland Communities, a developer from San Diego, California. The property was one of the last large tracts within the city limits of Sugar Land that was open for development. In February 2005, Newland broke ground on Telfair, a planned community located on former prison land. The community was named after Telfair Square in Savannah, Georgia. The developer planned to build 4,000 to 4,500 houses, and it planned to open the first group of houses in the northern hemisphere Spring of 2006. The development opened in 2006.

In 2009, Telfair had a 10% sales increase. At that time, new house sales in most areas of Houston had decreased by double digits. As of March 2010, of the 2,800 planned houses, over 1,600 of them had been constructed. In 2010 the Houston Business Journal awarded the development three landmark awards: one for the best residential community, and two for transforming a housing facility of the Central Unit into a museum facility.

The Imperial State Farm Cemetery, where inmates from the old prison were buried from 1912 to the 1930s, still remains in the center of a grass field in the northwest section of Telfair. Telfair's central road, University Boulevard, was previously named Flanagan Road after Imperial Prison Farm (the old name of the Central Prison Unit) warden R. J. "Buck" Flanagan (1880–1949), who held the position for 30 years until his death.

== Composition ==
The community is located on U.S. Route 59 / Interstate 69 (Southwest Freeway). The main entrance is on University Boulevard, south of Texas State Highway 6.

== Economy ==
In 2012, Texas Instruments announced that it was relocating its Fort Bend County operations from Stafford to the Telfair area. The construction was completed and the building opened in early 2014.

== Education ==
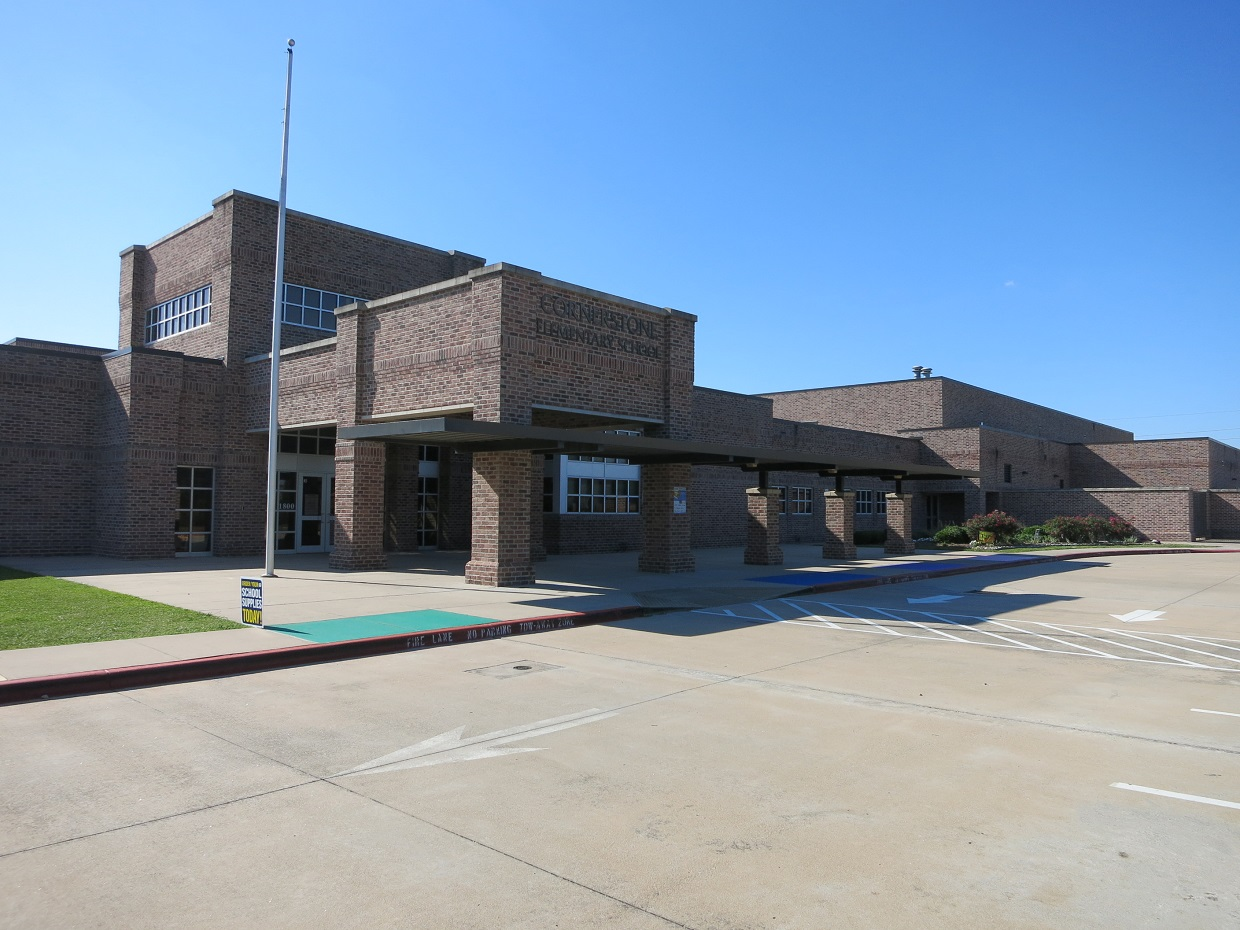
Cornerstone Elementary School

Residents are zoned to the Fort Bend Independent School District.

Telfair is zoned to Cornerstone Elementary School (in Telfair), Sartartia Middle School, and Clements High School,

Portions were previously zoned to Kempner High School.

== Parks and recreation ==
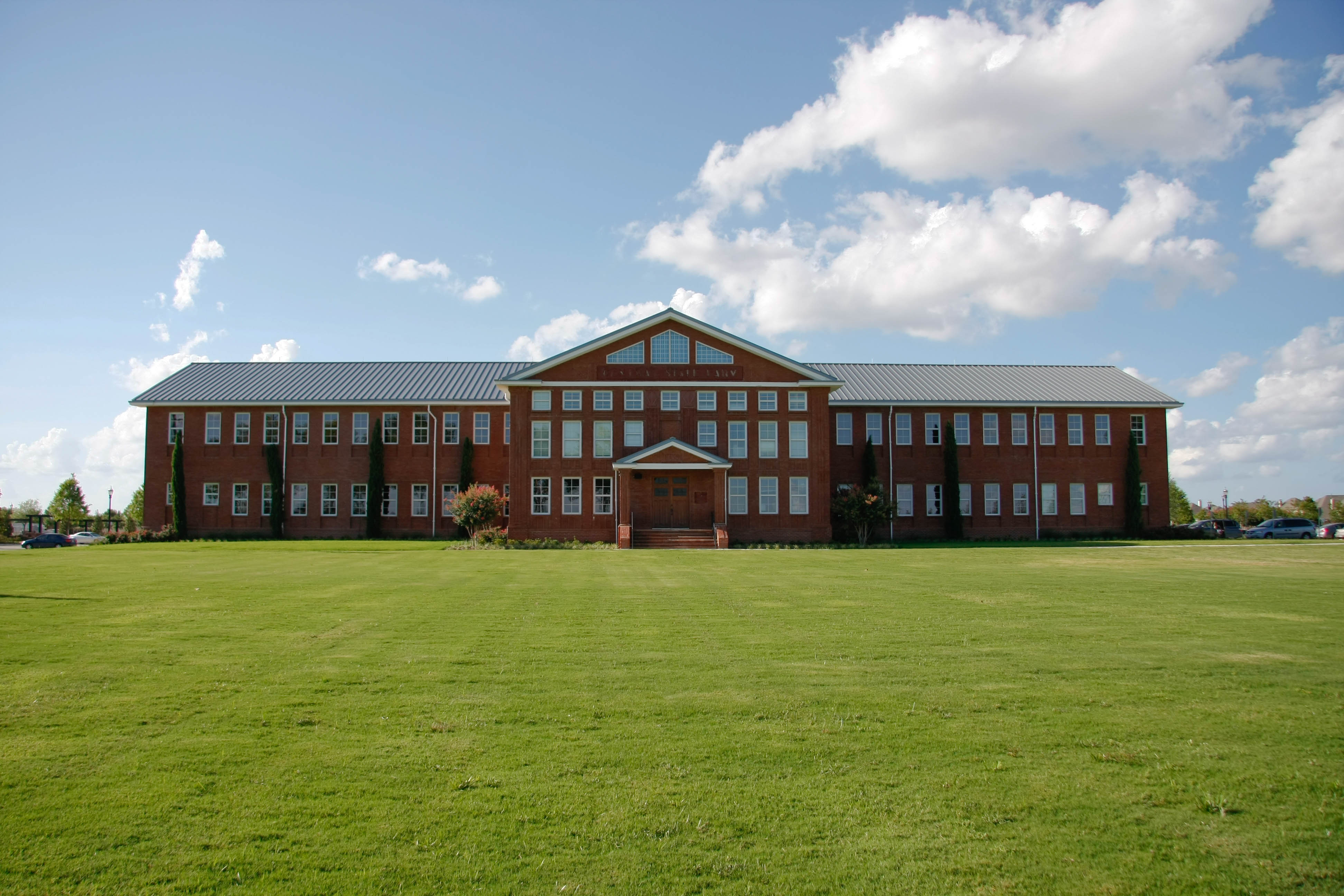
Two Camp, a former brick building of the Central Unit, now the Houston Museum of Natural Science Sugar Land

The community includes Telfair Central Hall, a 9,545-square-foot (886.8 m^{2}) community center with a design matching the former Central Unit Two Camp building. The building is near New Territory Boulevard and University Boulevard.

The original community plans stated that 417 acres (169 ha) of the property would be recreational land. Newland planned to add a 70-acre (28 ha) lake. The community includes a plot of land earmarked to house a future municipal park, which would take an additional 70 acres.

=== Houston Museum of Natural Science Sugar Land ===
The former Central Unit parcel included a former inmate dormitory, Two Camp, Newland decided to restore the former dormitory building, which had some broken windows and some loose exterior bricks. The company arranged to place a new metal roof on the building. City officials and local historians positively reacted to the decision from Newland. In 2009 the 43,000 square feet (4,000 m^{2}) Two Camp Building and its surrounding land became the Houston Museum of Natural Science Sugar Land. The subdivision donated the building and land to the City of Sugar Land, and the city leases the building to the museum. The museum spent $3 million to help renovate the building.
