= Isaac Herbert Kempner =

American mayor and businessman (1873–1967)

Mayor of Galveston, Texas
- In office 1917–1919
- Preceded by: Lewis Dallam Fisher
- Succeeded by: Harry O. Sappington

Personal details
- Born: January 14, 1873 Cincinnati, Ohio, U.S.
- Died: July 31, 1967 (aged 94) Galveston, Texas, U.S.
- Spouse: Henrietta Blum (m. 1902)
- Children: Harris L. Kempner, Isaac Herbert, Jr., Cecille, Lyda, and Henrietta Leonora.
- Parent(s): Harris Kempner, Eliza Seinsheimer Kempner
- Education: Washington and Lee University
- Known for: Founder of Imperial Sugar

Isaac Herbert Kempner (January 14, 1873 – August 1, 1967) was the founder of the Imperial Sugar Corporation and mayor of Galveston, Texas.

== Early years ==
Kempner was born in Cincinnati on January 14, 1873, to Harris Kempner and Eliza Seinsheimer Kempner. Although the newly married Kempners were residing in Galveston, Eliza traveled to Cincinnati in preparation for giving birth, where her family was living and better medical care was available. Kempner was one of eleven children in the family.

Kempner attended primary public schools in Galveston while also receiving Jewish religious training and completing a bar mitzvah. Following the counsel of Rabbi Henry Cohen, he enrolled in St. Mary's, a Catholic preparatory school in Galveston for part of his secondary education. St. Mary's, however, served a secular purpose for Kempner and he continued to attend Temple B'nai Israel for religious purposes. After graduation from St. Mary's, he attended Bellevue High School in Virginia. Bellevue prepared for Kempner's acceptance at Washington and Lee University

== Career ==
As a teenager, Kempner apprenticed for his father, Harris Kempner in the cotton factoring business. Harris Kempner not only tutored his eldest son in the business of cotton markets, but also in business ethics. In 1895, the Galveston Cotton Exchange appointed Kempner to serve as its director. The same year, Kempner served on Galveston's Deep Water Committee, which functioned as a rate-setter for the Galveston Wharf Company.

Following the death of Harris Kempner, Isaac took control of the business named for his father, H. Kempner. It remained a family-owned cotton business, but adapted to seek opportities in banking and finance. Kempner's younger brothers assumed some of the executive positions of these various businesses.

In 1905, Kempner and fellow Galveston businessman William Lewis Moody Jr., established the American National Insurance Company; However, by 1908, Kempner had sold his shares in the insurance company and with his family members, and a partner, William T. Eldridge, purchased a sugar plantation and mill in the area that would become the company town of Sugar Land. Over the following years, they acquired additional assets and controlled the majority of the sugar industry in Texas. These holdings were incorporated into the Imperial Sugar Company in 1924. After Eldridge died, Kempner and his siblings acquired his partner's interest in the business. In addition to his sugar and cotton holdings, Kempner was also involved in real estate and insurance businesses and, along with his siblings, held ownership in the United States National Bank in Galveston.

Kempner also contributed construction funds for the original 3.3 mile Galveston Seawall (which is currently 10 miles as of 2017).

== Political life ==
Kempner held various positions on the Galveston Cotton Exchange for the majority of his life. He was Galveston's finance commissioner from 1901 to 1915 and its mayor from 1917 to 1919. He is cited as one of the original proponents of the commission form of government. As finance commissioner, Kempner's financing scheme for the construction of the Galveston Seawall followed the Great Storm of 1900.

== Personal life ==
After the death of his father, Kempner assumed the role of family patriarch and instituted a similar pattern to dispensing resources to the family as his father had done. This included conservative gender roles for his children. Just as Kempner and his brothers were the only beneficiaries of religious and secular education, Kempner repeated this pattern with his younger siblings and children.

In December 1902, Kempner married Henrietta "Hennie" Blum, who was a Galveston native and a friend from childhood. They had five children together, all born between 1903 and 1913: Harris Leon Kempner, Isaac Herbert Kempner Jr., Cecile, Lyda, and Henrietta Leonora.

== Death and legacy ==
Kempner died in Galveston on August 1, 1967. He is buried in the Island City at the Hebrew Benevolent Society Cemetery.

Sugar Land, the company town he helped found, has grown into one of the largest suburbs of the Houston–Sugar Land–Baytown metropolitan area. Kempner High School in Sugar Land is named in his honor. A historical district of Galveston, the Kempner Park neighborhood, is bounded by Broadway, 23rd Street, Seawall Boulevard, and 39th Street. The entire stretch of 22nd Street in Galveston is named in his honor. Kempner, along with his siblings, was a founder of the Harris & Eliza Kempner Fund, a charitable foundation dedicated to the health and well-being of Galveston families as well as the improvement of Galveston.

Kempner's granddaughter, Lyda Ann Thomas, served as the mayor of Galveston from 2004 to 2010.

== See also ==
- History of the Jews in Galveston, Texas

== Bibliography ==
- Cartwright, Gary (1991). Galveston: A History of the Island. Fort Worth: TCU Press. ISBN 0-87565-190-9.
- Hyman, Harold M. (1990). Oleander Odyssey: The Kempners of Galveston, Texas, 1854−1980s. College Station, TX: Texas A&M University Press. ISBN 0-89096-438-6.
- Maca, Kathleen (2021). A History of the Hotel Galvez. Charleston, SC: History Press. ISBN 9781625858443.
- McComb, David G. (1986). Galveston: A History. Austin: University of Texas Press. ISBN 978-0-292-72053-4.
