= Winslow Oliver =

American football player (born 1973)

No. 20, 33, 26
- Position: Running back

Personal information
- Born: March 3, 1973 (age 53); Houston, Texas, U.S.
- Listed height: 5 ft 8 in (1.73 m)
- Listed weight: 180 lb (82 kg)

Career information
- High school: Kempner (Sugar Land, Texas)
- College: New Mexico
- NFL draft: 1996: 3rd round, 73rd overall pick

Career history
- Carolina Panthers (1996–1998); Atlanta Falcons (1999–2000)

Awards and highlights
- WAC Freshman of the Year (1992)

Career NFL statistics
- Rushing yards: 215
- Rushing average: 3.8
- Receptions: 29
- Receiving yards: 265
- Return yards: 2,023
- Total touchdowns: 2
- Stats at Pro Football Reference

Winslow Paul Oliver (born March 3, 1973) is an American former professional football player who was a running back in the National Football League (NFL) for the Carolina Panthers and Atlanta Falcons. He played college football for the New Mexico Lobos.

== Career ==
Oliver is a 1991 graduate of Kempner High School in Sugar Land, Texas. He also attended the University of New Mexico, where he set a number of team records and was awarded the 1996 Hula Bowl MVP.

In the third round of the 1996 NFL draft (#73 overall pick) Oliver was selected by the Panthers. He played for the Panthers for three seasons, mainly on special teams. His jersey was #20. The highlight of his career was an 84-yard punt return for a touchdown against the New Orleans Saints on September 8, 1996.

He became a free agent and played for the Falcons in the 1999 and 2000 seasons, before being released. In 1999 he wore #33, before switching to #26 his last year in the NFL.
