= Tre Thomas =

American football player (born 1975)

No. 17, 30, 29
- Position: Defensive back

Personal information
- Born: September 12, 1975 (age 51); Houston, Texas, U.S.
- Listed height: 6 ft 1 in (1.85 m)
- Listed weight: 216 lb (98 kg)

Career information
- High school: Kempner (Sugar Land, Texas)
- College: Texas
- NFL draft: 1997: undrafted

Career history
- Detroit Lions (1997)*; Jacksonville Jaguars (1998)*; Texas Terminators (1999); Berlin Thunder (1999); New York Giants (1999); Memphis Maniax (2001)
- * Offseason or practice squad member only
- Stats at Pro Football Reference

Carl Grady "Tre" Thomas III (born September 12, 1975) is an American former professional football player who was a defensive back for the New York Giants of the National Football League (NFL). He played college football for the Texas Longhorns. Thomas also played professionally in NFL Europa and the XFL.

== Background ==
Born in Sugar Land, Texas, he graduated from Kempner High School. He played college football for the University of Texas at Austin from 1993 to 1996 during which time they won the last SWC Championship in 1995 and the first Big 12 conference Championship in 1996. Against Pittsburgh in 1995, he recorded 3 interceptions, tied for the 2nd most interceptions in a game in school history.

== Pro football career ==
=== Detroit Lions ===
Thomas went undrafted out of college but was signed by the Detroit Lions in 1997. He was cut at the end of training camp, but then later made their practice squad.

=== Jacksonville Jaguars ===
In 1998 he signed with the Jacksonville Jaguars, was again cut at the end of training camp and again made their practice squad.

=== Texas Terminators ===
In 1999, he was signed by the Texas Terminators of the Indoor Professional Football League. After 4 games he was signed by the Berlin Thunder of the NFL Europe and left the team.

=== Berlin Thunder ===
Thomas played the entire 1999 NFLE season with Berlin, recording 23 tackles and 4 deflected passes.

=== New York Giants ===
When the NFLE season ended he was signed by the New York Giants. He was released by the Giants at the end of the 1999 training camp but he was brought back to the practice squad in October. He spent much of the season on the practice squad but was elevated for three games of which he played in two, recording a tackle while wearing jersey #29. The Giants resigned him in the 2000 offseason. He was later waived.

=== Memphis Maniax ===
In October 2000, he was selected by the Memphis Maniax in the 22nd Round of the XFL draft. He played in 4 games and started 2, recording 2 tackles. Six games into the season, he was moved to the practice squad and two games later he was waived.
