= Houston Museum of Natural Science =

Coordinates: 29°43′18″N 95°23′23″W

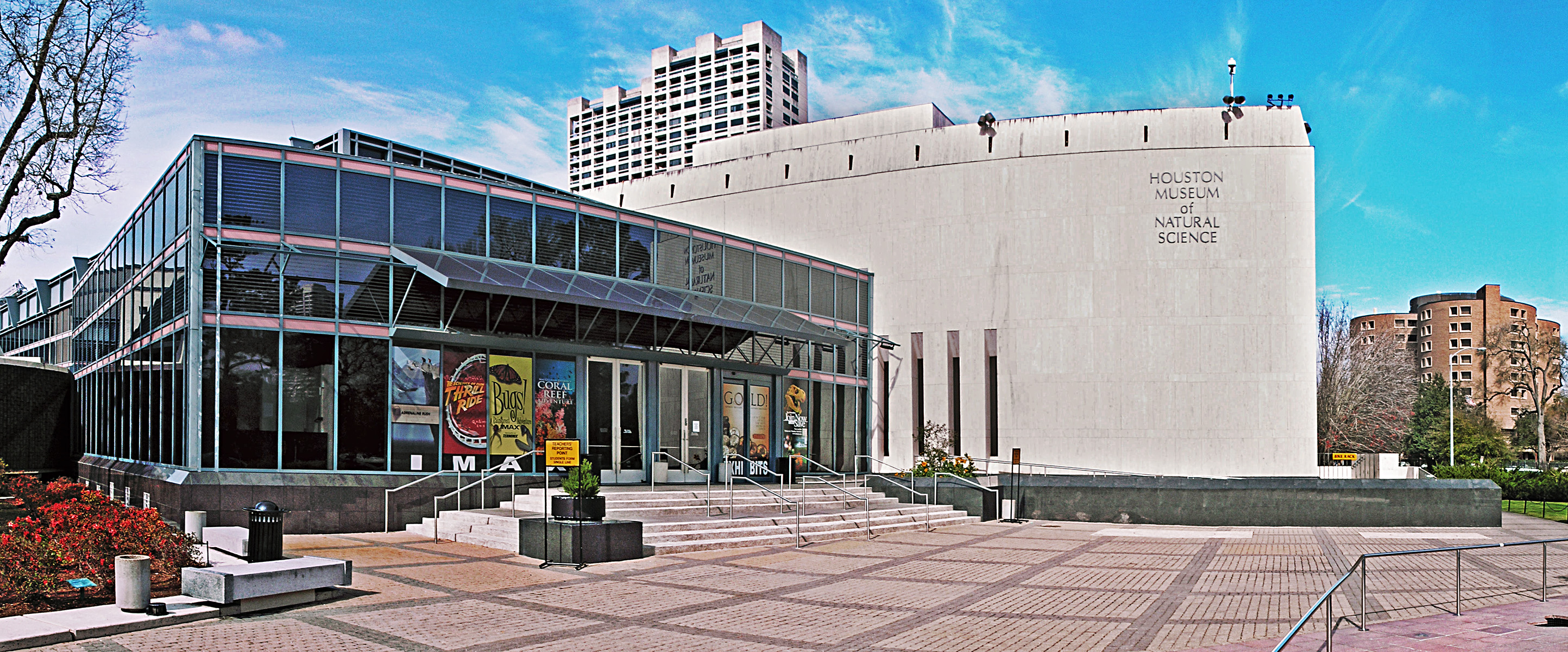
- Southeast entrance of the Houston Museum of Natural Science in 2005
- Established: 1909
- Location: Houston, Texas
- Type: Natural history museum
- Public transit access: Red Line Museum District
- Website: www.hmns.org

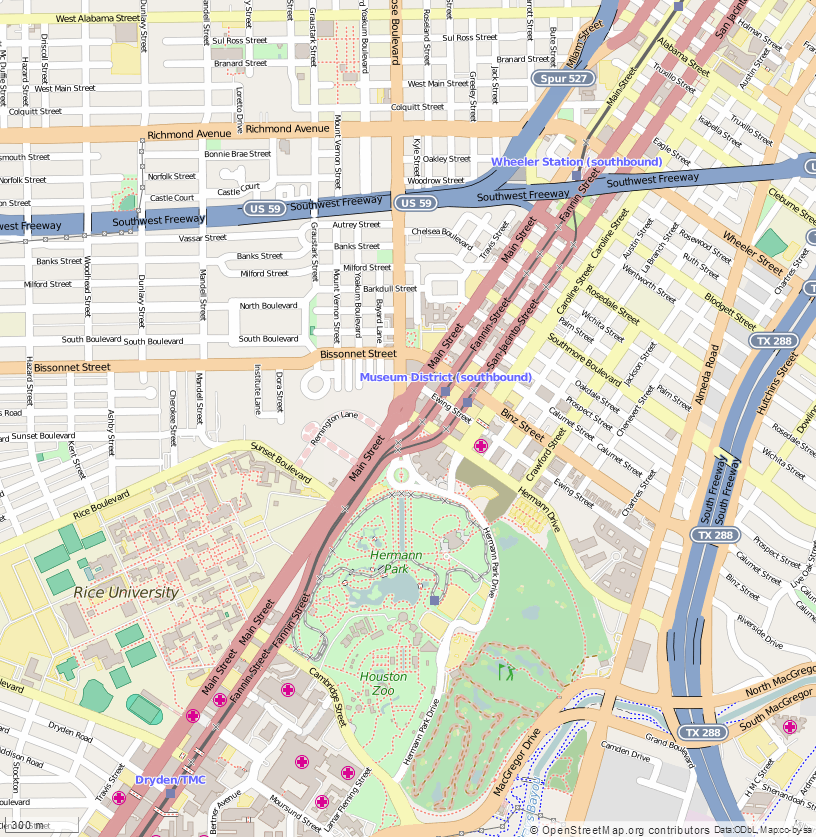
Location within Houston Museum District

The Houston Museum of Natural Science (abbreviated as HMNS) is a natural history museum located on the northern border of Hermann Park in Houston, Texas, United States. The museum was established in 1909 by the Houston Museum and Scientific Society, an organization whose goals were to provide a free institution for the people of Houston focusing on education and science. The museum complex consists of a central facility with four floors of natural science halls and exhibits, the Burke Baker Planetarium, the Cockrell Butterfly Center, and the Wortham Giant Screen Theatre (formerly known as the Wortham IMAX Theatre). In 2024, the museum received 1,547,000 visitors, making it the eleventh most-visited museum in the United States and the third most-visited science museum in the U.S. HMNS is the most visited museum in the country outside of the New York City or Washington, D.C. metropolitan areas. Much of the museum's popularity is attributed to its large number of special or guest exhibits.

== History ==
The initial museum organization was called the Houston Museum and Scientific Society, Inc., and was created in 1909. The museum's primary collection was acquired between 1914 and 1930. This included the purchase of a natural-history collection assembled by Henry Philemon Attwater and a donation from collector John Milsaps, the latter of which formed the core of the museum's gem and mineral collection. First housed in Houston's city auditorium, the collection was subsequently housed in the Central Library for seven years, and then at a site in the Houston Zoo in 1929. The museum's now wide-ranging education programs began in 1947 and, in its second year, hosted 12,000 children.

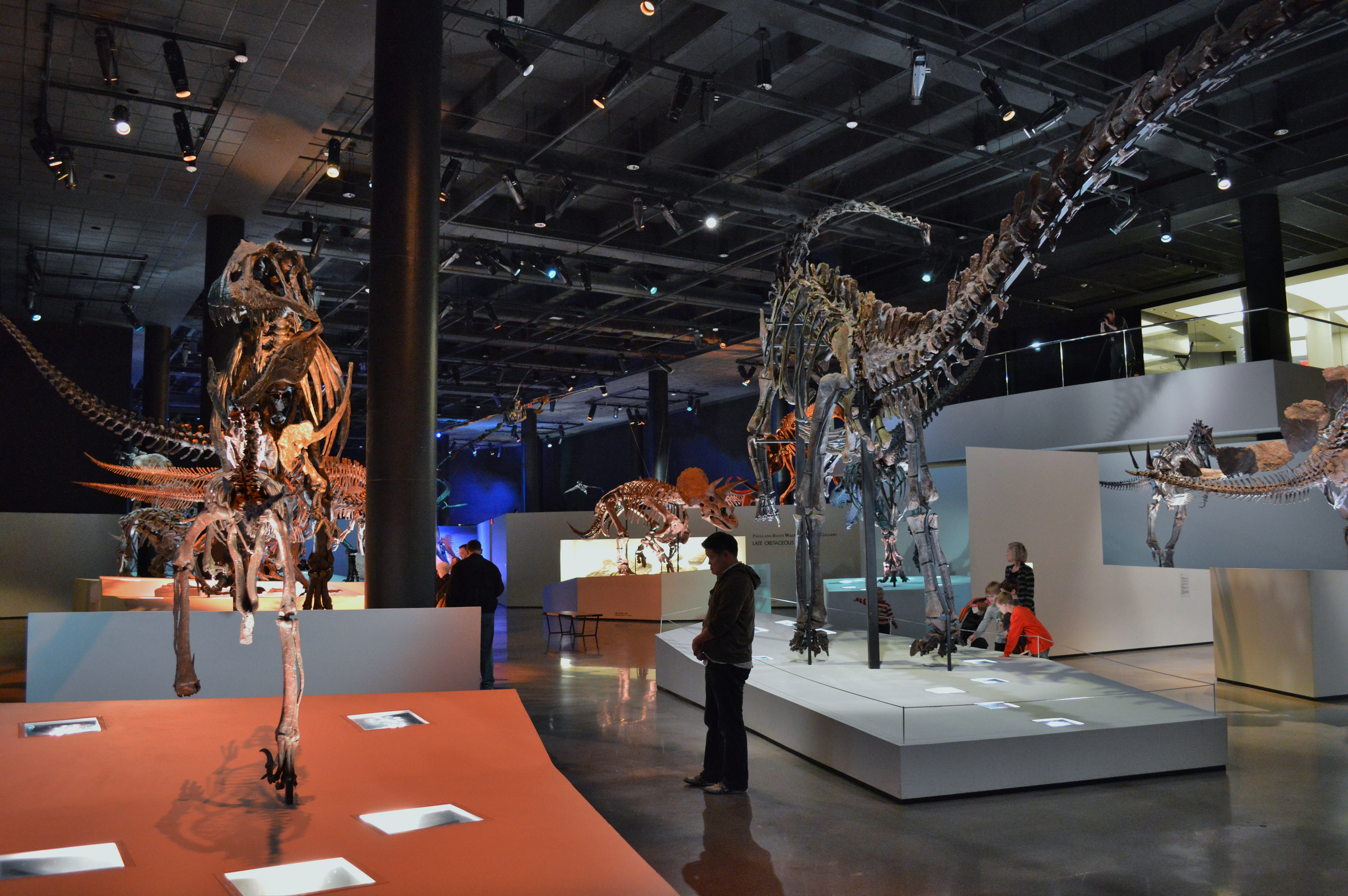
Morian Hall of Paleontology

The museum was officially renamed the Houston Museum of Natural Science in 1960. Construction of the current facility in Hermann Park began in 1964 and was completed in 1969.

By the 1980s, the museum's permanent displays included a dinosaur exhibit, a space museum, and exhibits on geology, biology, petroleum science, technology, and geography. In 1988, the Challenger Learning Center was opened in memory of the Space Shuttle Challenger crew members that were lost during the shuttle's tenth mission. The center's aim is to teach visitors about space exploration. The Wortham IMAX Theatre and the offsite George Observatory were opened in 1989.

Museum attendance was more than one million visitors in 1990. HMNS trustees determined that new state-of-the-art facilities, additional space, and renovations to current exhibits were needed because of the increased attendance. Between 1991 and 1994, a number of exhibit halls were renovated and the expansion of the Sterling Hall of Research was completed. The Cockrell Butterfly Center and the Brown Hall of Entomology opened in July 1994.

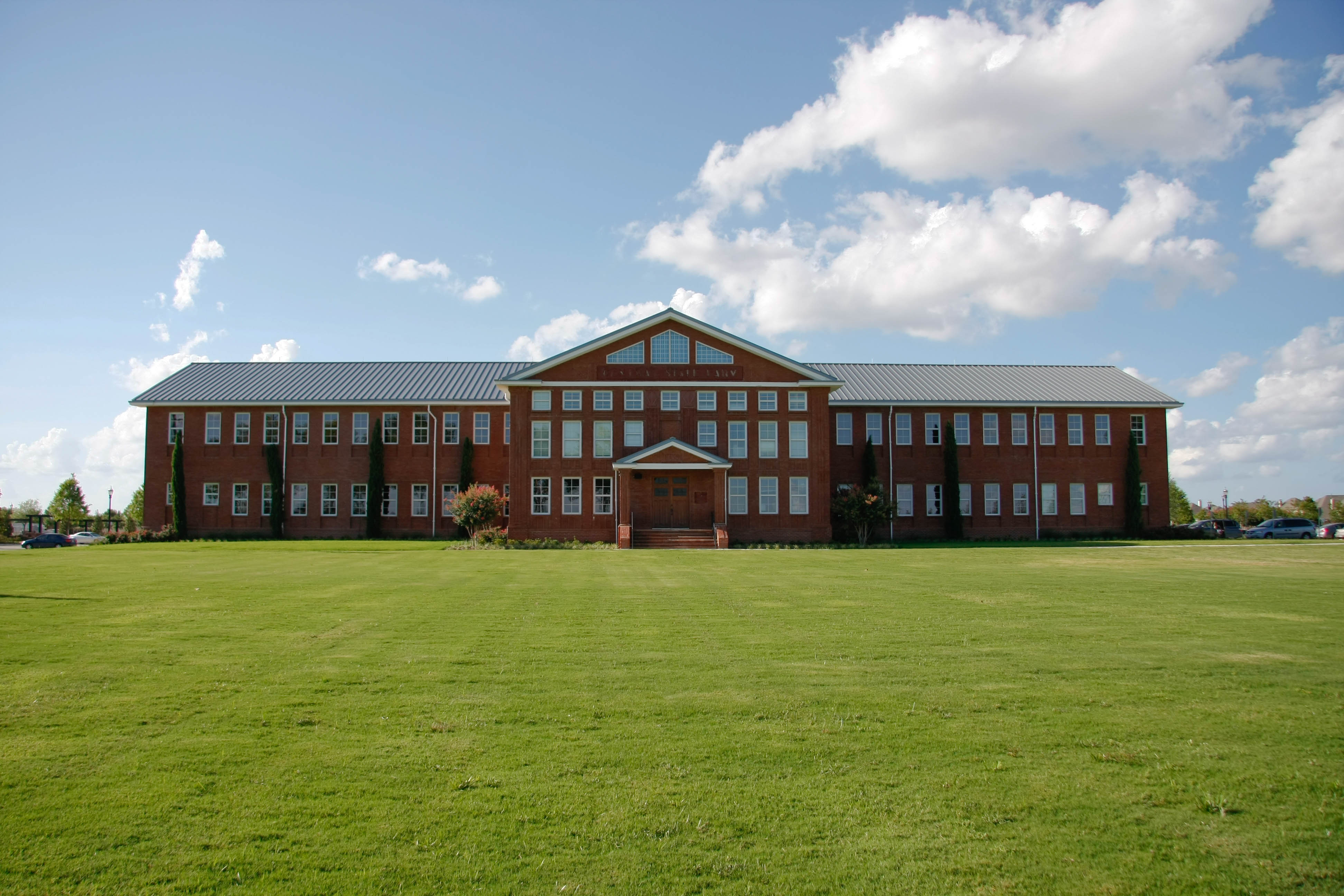
The HMNS Sugar Land satellite museum in Telfair, Sugar Land, Texas

In March 2007, the museum opened the HMNS Woodlands X-ploration Station, located in the Woodlands Mall. The facility was home to an interactive Dig Pit, where children could excavate a mock Triceratops, a variety of living exhibits, fossils, and minerals. The Woodlands location closed on September 7, 2009, less than a month before HMNS opened a satellite museum in Sugar Land, Texas.

HMNS celebrated its 100th year in 2009. During that year, the museum offered a multitude of family programs, lectures, free events, and kids' classes as part of the "Fun Hundred" celebration.

On October 3, 2009, HMNS opened its satellite museum in Telfair, Sugar Land. The building and surrounding land that became HMNS at Sugar Land was once part of the Central Unit, a Texas Department of Criminal Justice prison that had been unoccupied for several decades.

In March 2012, the Wortham IMAX Theatre was converted from 70 mm film to 3D digital and renamed the Wortham Giant Screen Theatre.

In June 2012, HMNS opened a new 230,000-square-foot (21,000 m^{2}) wing to house its paleontology hall, more than doubling the size of the original museum. Paleoartist, Julius Csotonyi, created fourteen murals based closely on concept drawings by HMNS Curator of Paleontology, Robert Bakker, for the new paleontology hall. The Morian Hall of Paleontology contains more than 60 large skeleton mounts, including three Tyrannosaurus and three large Quetzalcoatlus.

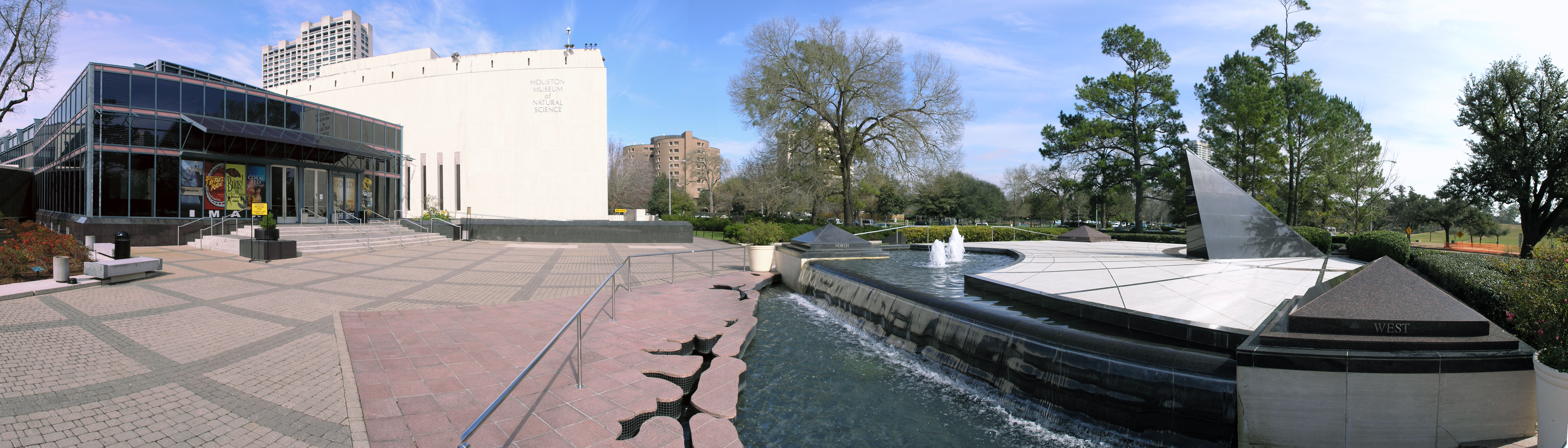
Sundial (right) and front exterior of Houston Museum of Natural Science

== Permanent exhibits ==
- The Foucault pendulum, demonstrating the Earth's rotation. The length of the pendulum's cable is over 60 feet (18 m) long.
- Cullen Hall of Gems & Minerals, featuring a large exhibit of over 750 crystallized mineral specimens and rare gemstones.
- Lester and Sue Smith Gem Vault, showcasing some of the most exquisite finely cut gems in jewelry.
- Farish Hall of Texas Wildlife exhibits animals and wildlife native to Texas. The hall contains a video wall that displays the plants, animals and topography of the seven biotic regions of the state.
- Evelyn and Herbert Frensley Hall of African Wildlife, a display of taxidermied animals, including one of only two okapis exhibited in North America. Opening in 1969, the hall allows visitors to explore the seven biomes of the continent of Africa. Contains over 120 specimens, including 42 species of birds and 28 species of mammals are on display.
- Strake Hall of Malacology, with many specimens of mollusks.
- Morian Hall of Paleontology, the largest paleontology hall in the United States. Contains over 60 major skeleton mounts, including three Tyrannosaurus, a Diplodocus and the most complete Triceratops skeleton ever discovered. It also houses one of the largest trilobite collections in existence. Robert Bakker serves as Curator of Paleontology.
- John P. McGovern Hall of the Americas, showing more than 50 cultures worth of pre-Columbian archaeological artifacts.
- Matter and Motion, Opened in 2025 this new exhibition explores chemistry, the periodic table of elements, and physics with interactive screens, displays, and games including an electromagnet, a model particle accelerator, and a holographic running game that determins how many watts you made by running.
- Wiess Energy Hall, with displays themed around energetics, petroleum geology, and oil exploration. Renovated and expanded in 2017, the hall consists of 16 sections, including a working replica of an offshore drilling rig drill floor, a 15K resolution video depicting the history of energy, the "Geovator" (a simulated trip into the rock beneath Houston and back in time to the Cretaceous Period), the "Eagle Ford Shale Experience" (a simulated journey to Karnes County, Texas, to experience the hydraulic fracturing of an oil well from inside the cracked rock), "Energy City" (a 1/150th scale white model depicting the entire energy value chain brought to life through projection mapping using 32 laser projectors), and Renewable and Future Energy Sources.
- Hall of Ancient Egypt opened in May 2013 and contains many millennia-old artifacts and features recreations of Egyptian temples and mummies from this ancient primary civilization.
- Cockrell Sundial opened in 1989 and is one of the world's largest sundials. It includes lenses on a special chrome ball on top of the gnomon so that at solar noon on the equinoxes and solstices, sunlight shines through and casts an image of the Sun. Large sunspots can be seen by holding a white card in the beam and moving until it is focus.
- Earth Forum, which opened in 2002, is a computer-aided and hands-on exhibit teaching about Earth and its processes. The "Earth Update" software was developed by Rice University with NASA funding.
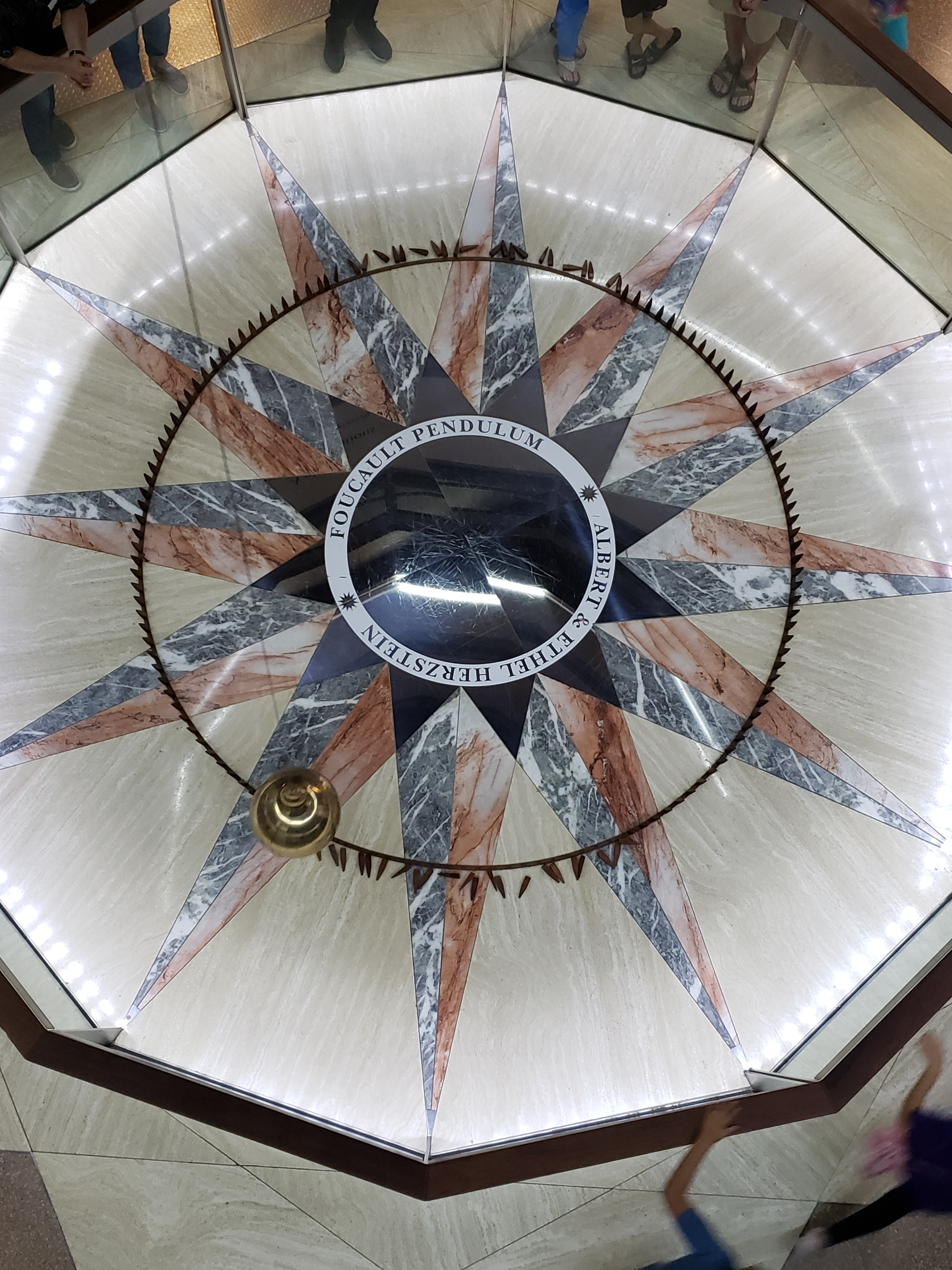
Foucault Pendulum on display

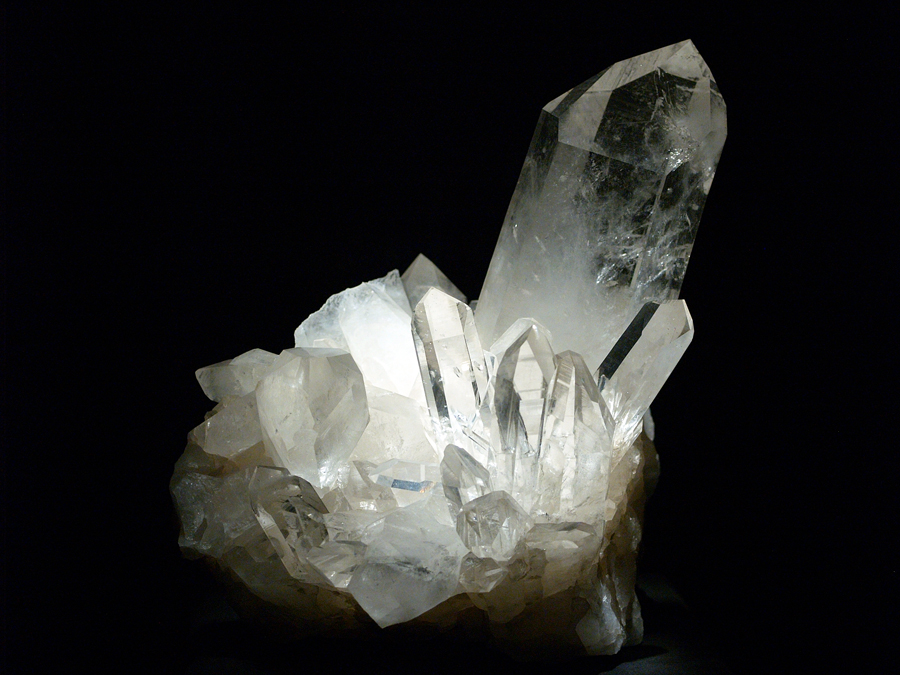
Quartz crystal from Hot Springs, Arkansas, on display

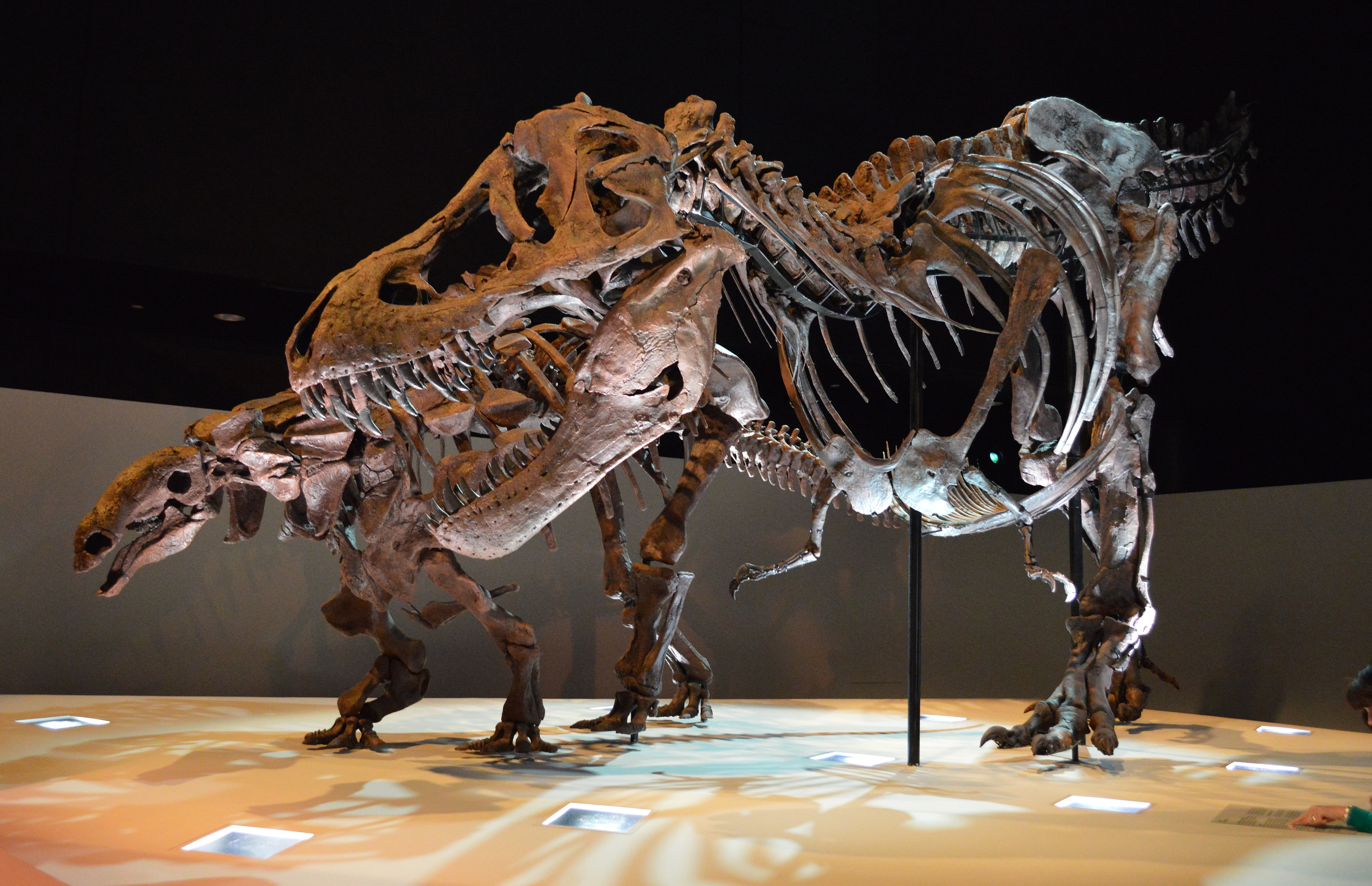
Denversaurus and the "Wyrex" Tyrannosaurus specimen exhibited in the Morian Hall of Paleontology

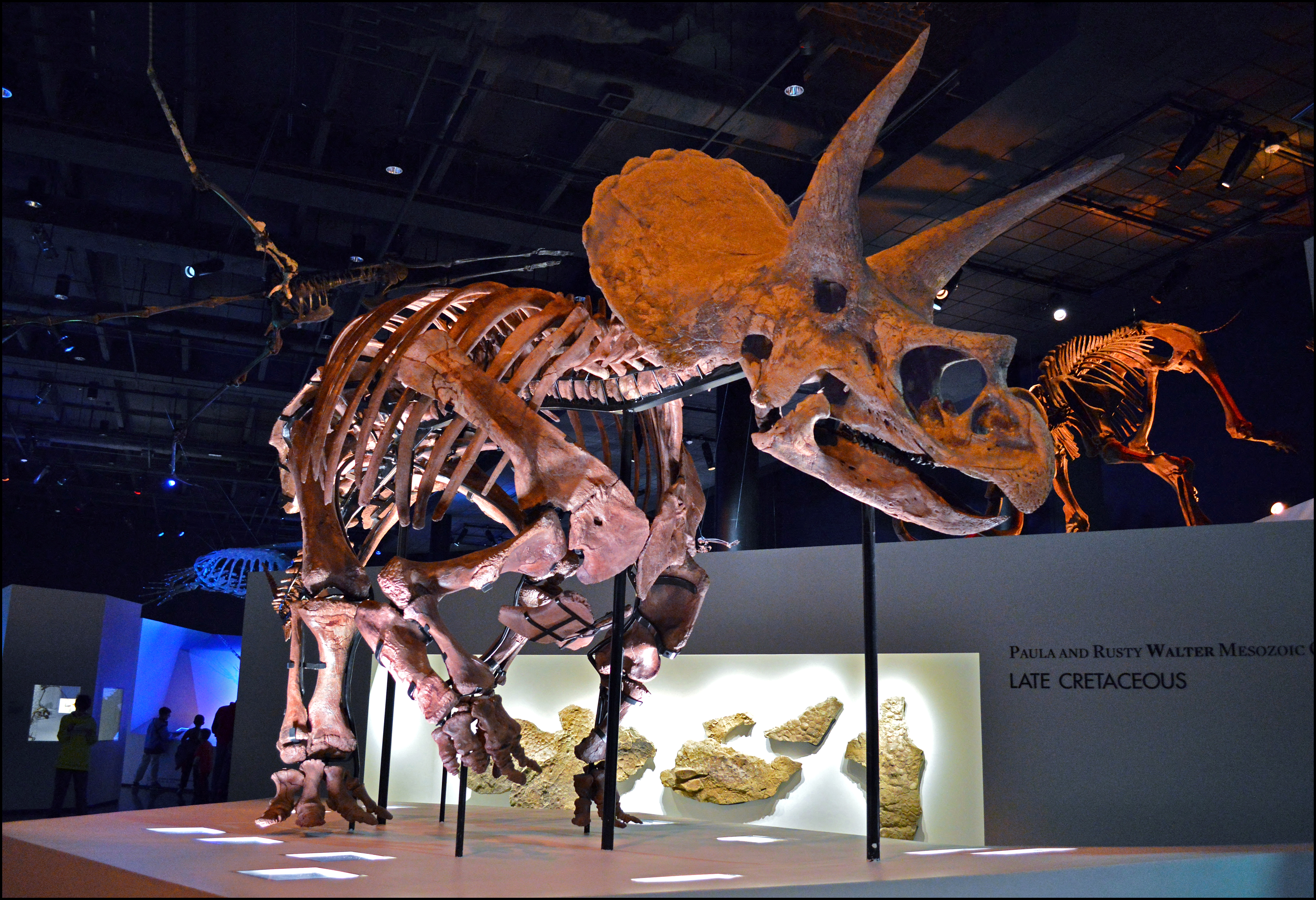
Triceratops skeleton at the Houston Museum in a controversial running posture

== Facilities ==
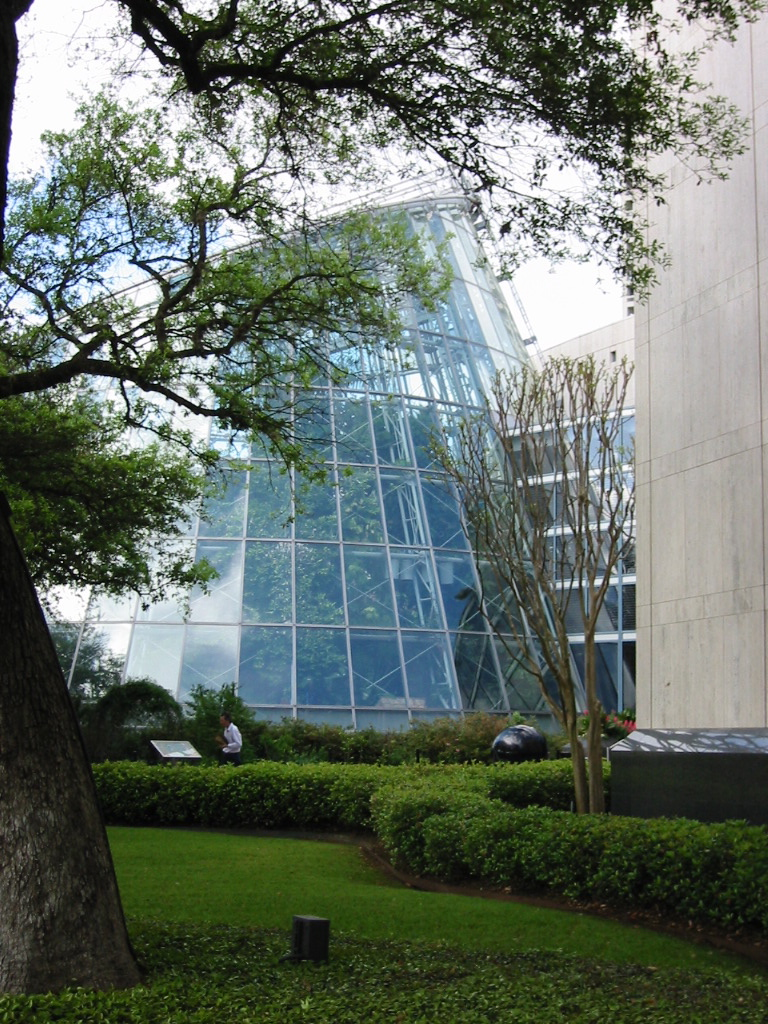
Cockrell Butterfly Center at the Houston Museum of Natural Science

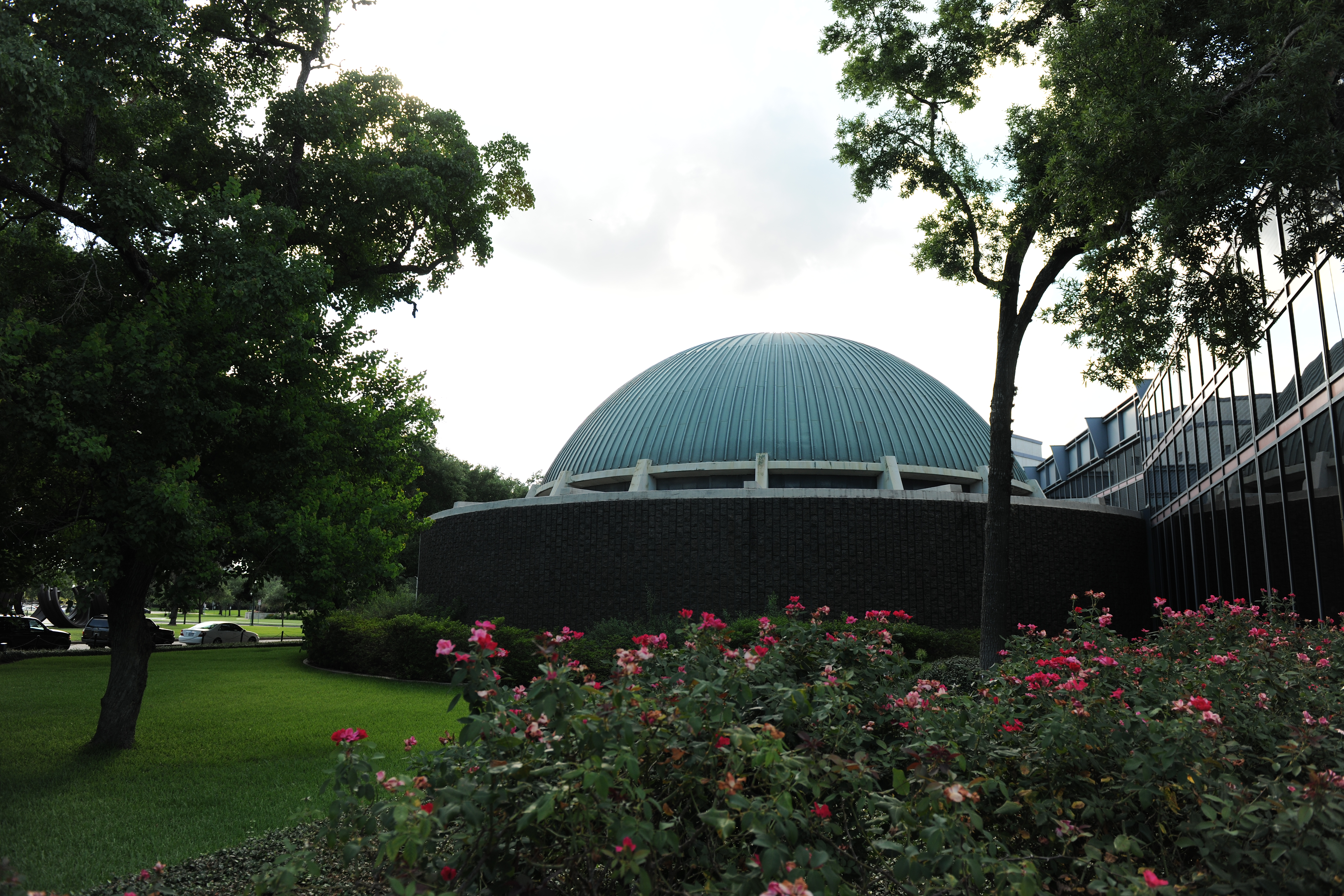
Exterior of the Burke Baker Planetarium

Burke Baker Planetarium presents a range of science and astronomy shows. As of 2016, the planetarium is equipped with the Digistar 5 fulldome projection system. It is one of the first 8k planetariums in the United States.

Originally opened in 1969 with a Spitz Space Transit Planetarium, the Planetarium upgraded to an Evans & Sutherland Digistar 1 vector display in 1988, and was the first in the U.S. and third in the world to adopt multiple-projector digital image capability using the Sky-Skan SkyVision system in 1998. That allowed it to show fulldome movies, many of which were created by HMNS staff. Since 2004 its outreach program, "Discovery Dome", takes the planetarium experience on the road, reaching over 40,000 students per year in classrooms and special events in portable digital domes.

Cockrell Butterfly Center, a butterfly zoo located in museum complex. Opened in 1994, the center is housed in a three-story glass building filled with tropical plants and butterflies. The center exhibits a large range of live butterflies, including the migratory monarchs and their tropical cousins. The Cockrell Butterfly Center was reopened in May 2007 after being overhauled to make the exhibit more interactive; there are now games for children and a live insect zoo in the Brown Hall of Entomology.

Wortham Giant Screen Theatre, a 394-seat theater presenting various educational films in 4K digital with advanced 3D technology on its 60 by 80 feet (18 by 24 m) screen.

George Observatory, an astronomy observatory equipped with three domed telescopes, including a 36-inch (910 mm) Gueymard Research Telescope and a solar telescope. The facility is located south of Sugar Land, Texas, at Brazos Bend State Park. The observatory also houses a portion of the Challenger Learning Center for Space Science Education.
