= Kempner High School =

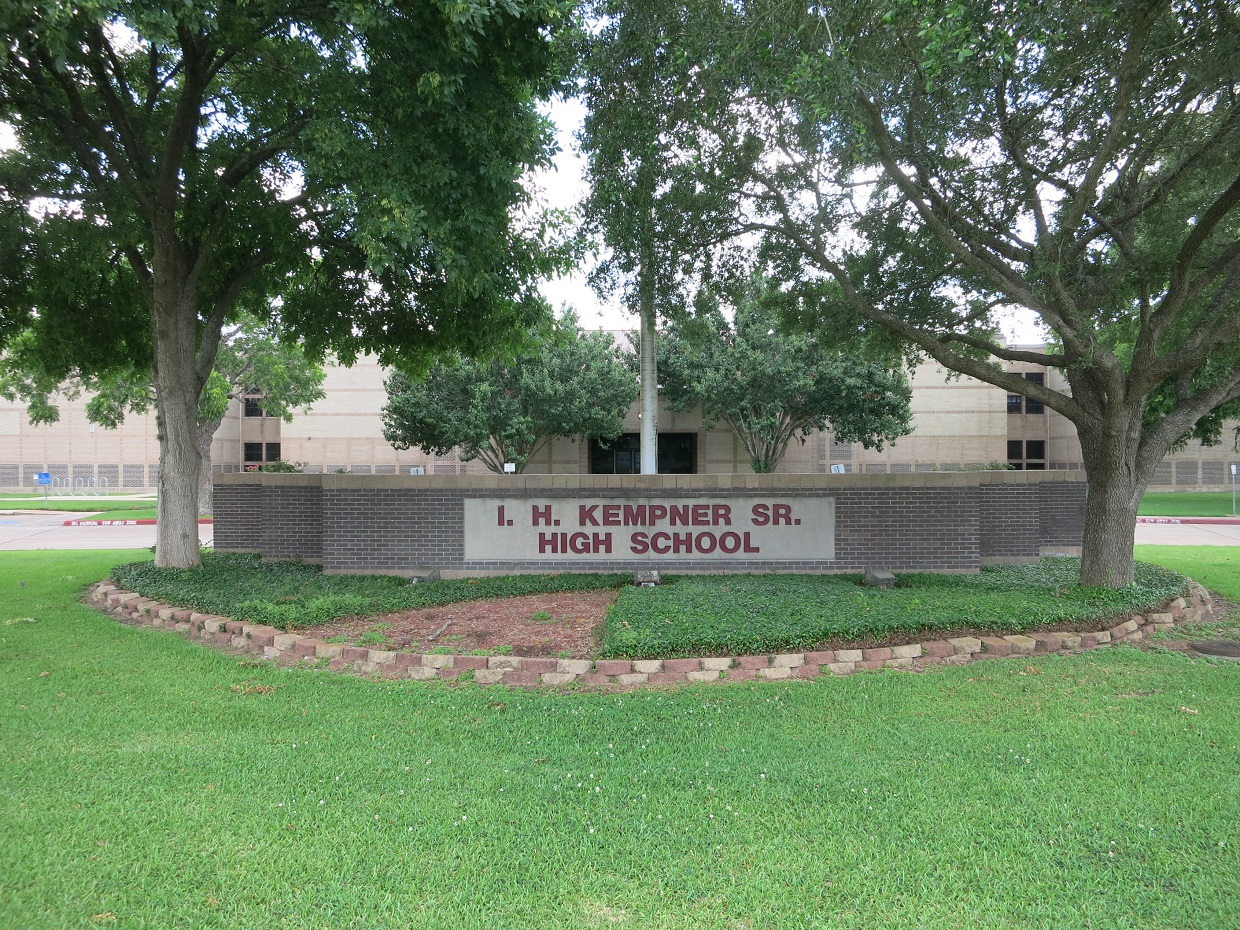

Location
- 14777 Voss Road; Sugar Land, Texas; United States; 29°38′36″N 95°38′46″W

Information
- Type: Public secondary school
- Motto: " THE LAND OF SUNSHINE AND GREATNESS”
- Established: 1988; 38 years ago
- School district: Fort Bend ISD
- Principal: Dr. Reginald Brown
- Assistant Principal (Class of 26'): Heather Squires
- Assistant Principal (Class of 27'): Joseph Maldonado
- Assistant Principal (Class of 28'): Matthew McCabe
- Assistant Principal (Class of 29'): Rontreall Jedkins
- Teaching staff: 109.48 (FTE)
- Grades: 9–12
- Enrollment: 1,896 (2023–2024)
- Student to teacher ratio: 17.32
- Campus: 55.88 acres (22.61 ha)
- Colors: Maroon, silver, and white
- Mascot: Cougar
- Newspaper: The Prowler
- Magnet program(s): Global Studies Academy (Class of 28' and beyond), and International Business and Marketing Academy (Class of 28' and beyond)
- Website: fortbendisd.com/khs

I.H. Kempner High School, better known simply as Kempner High School, is a public high school in Sugar Land, Texas and a part of the Fort Bend Independent School District (FBISD).

A small portion of the City of Houston is in the school's boundary. It also includes the former census-designated place of Town West (Townewest).

== History ==
In 1984, FBISD authorized a bond issue to allow the construction of a fourth high school within the district.

The school was named after Isaac Herbert Kempner, founder of Imperial Sugar, who contributed much to the development of early Sugar Land. Wayne Emerson was chosen by the board on January 11, 1988, to be the first principal of Kempner. The school opened its doors to the first Open House on August 30, 1988. The school, which was constructed at a cost of $15,522,300, contained 55.88 acres of pecan trees, a 750-seat auditorium, and 100 faculty and staff members. The school was initially populated in the fall of 1988 by students from William P Clements High School, which was becoming overcrowded due to population growth in Fort Bend county. In 1990 Kempner graduated its first senior class. Kempner was FBISD's fourth comprehensive high school.

When Kempner first opened, the area surrounding it was remote and mostly agricultural. In the years since, the school has seen growth in enrollment related to suburban development in the surrounding areas.

In the 1999–2000 school year, James May became the new principal, replacing Wayne Emerson, and remained in the role until his retirement in June 2008. Troy Mooney became the third principal of Kempner High School and served in that capacity until July 2010. During that time KHS achieved recognition as a Recognized High School from the Texas Education Agency as well as a 96th percentile National ranking from Newsweek magazine.

In the 2022-2023 school year, a plan was proposed to avoid overcrowding in Travis High School which included moving the two FBISD academies that Travis High School hosted (Global Studies & International Business and Marketing) to Kempner. The plan was approved in February 2023. Now Kempner hosts the Global Studies Academy and International Business and Marketing Academy for the class of 28’ and beyond.

== Student body ==
At one point (1995), Kempner had 3,000 students.

In the 2005–2006 school year, Kempner had a population of 2,616 students: 723 freshmen, 683 sophomores, 597 juniors, and 613 seniors.

According to the 2015–2016 Texas Education Agency, Kempner's student body comprises 37% non-Hispanic White, 30% Asian/Pacific Islander, 19% Hispanic, 13% African American, and <1% American Indian/Alaskan Native.

In 2013, Navjinder Singh, a worker at the Indian grocery shop Keemat Grocers who was quoted in The New York Times, stated that Kempner has hallways known for particular ethnic groups; for instance, "Desi hallway" refers to an area where students of Indian origins congregate.

== Boundaries and feeder patterns ==
Kempner High School, which serves grades 9 through 12, is a part of the Fort Bend Independent School District. Kempner serves portions of Sugar Land and a very small section of Houston. Kempner serves a portion of the First Colony development. Most of Telfair is zoned to Kempner.

The attendance boundary included the Smithville housing complex, which was employee housing of the Central Prison Unit housing minor dependents of Texas Department of Criminal Justice (TDCJ) staff, until the unit's 2011 closure.

The following elementary schools feed into Kempner:

- Barrington Place (partial)
- Drabek
- Fleming (partial)
- Lakeview (partial)
- Sugar Mill
- Townewest

The following middle schools feed into Kempner:

- Hodges Bend (partial)
- Sugar Land

== Notable alumni ==
- William Dominic "Billy" Austin, Class of 1993, played for the Indianapolis Colts 1998–2000.
- James Fortune, Class of 1996, Gospel singer
- George Iloka, Class of 2008, drafted by Cincinnati Bengals
- Brittney Karbowski, Class of 2004, voice actress
- Ethan Kelley, Class of 1998, drafted by the New England Patriots in 2003, and currently (2006) plays for the Cleveland Browns.
- Maxo Kream, Class of 2008, rapper
- Diana López, Class of 2002, Olympic bronze medalist (Taekwondo), 2005 World Champion
- Jean López, Class of 1991, Silver Medalist World Taekwondo Championships 1995, U.S. Olympic Coach 2004, 2008, 2012.
- Mark López, Class of 2000, Olympics silver medalist (Taekwondo), 2005 World Champion
- Steven López, Class of 1997, two-time Taekwondo Olympic gold medalist, 1 bronze. People Magazine's "50 Most Beautiful People"
- Winslow Oliver, Class of 1991, played in NFL from 1996-2000 for the Carolina Panthers and Atlanta Falcons.
- Ashley Spillers, Class of 2004, actress
- Carl Grady "Tre" Thomas III, Class of 1993, played for the N.Y. Giants in 1999.
