= Town West, Texas =

Coordinates: 29°39′50″N 95°37′52″W

Townewest is an unincorporated area in Fort Bend County, Texas, United States. As Town West, it is a former census-designated place, active as of the 1990 U.S. census. By the 2000 U.S. census, it was no longer listed.

The former CDP is in the extraterritorial jurisdiction of Houston.

It was developed by the company U.S. Homes circa 1979. It includes a clubhouse.

== Government and infrastructure ==
Northeast Fort Bend County Volunteer Fire Department maintains Station #1 in the former Townewest CDP.

== Education ==
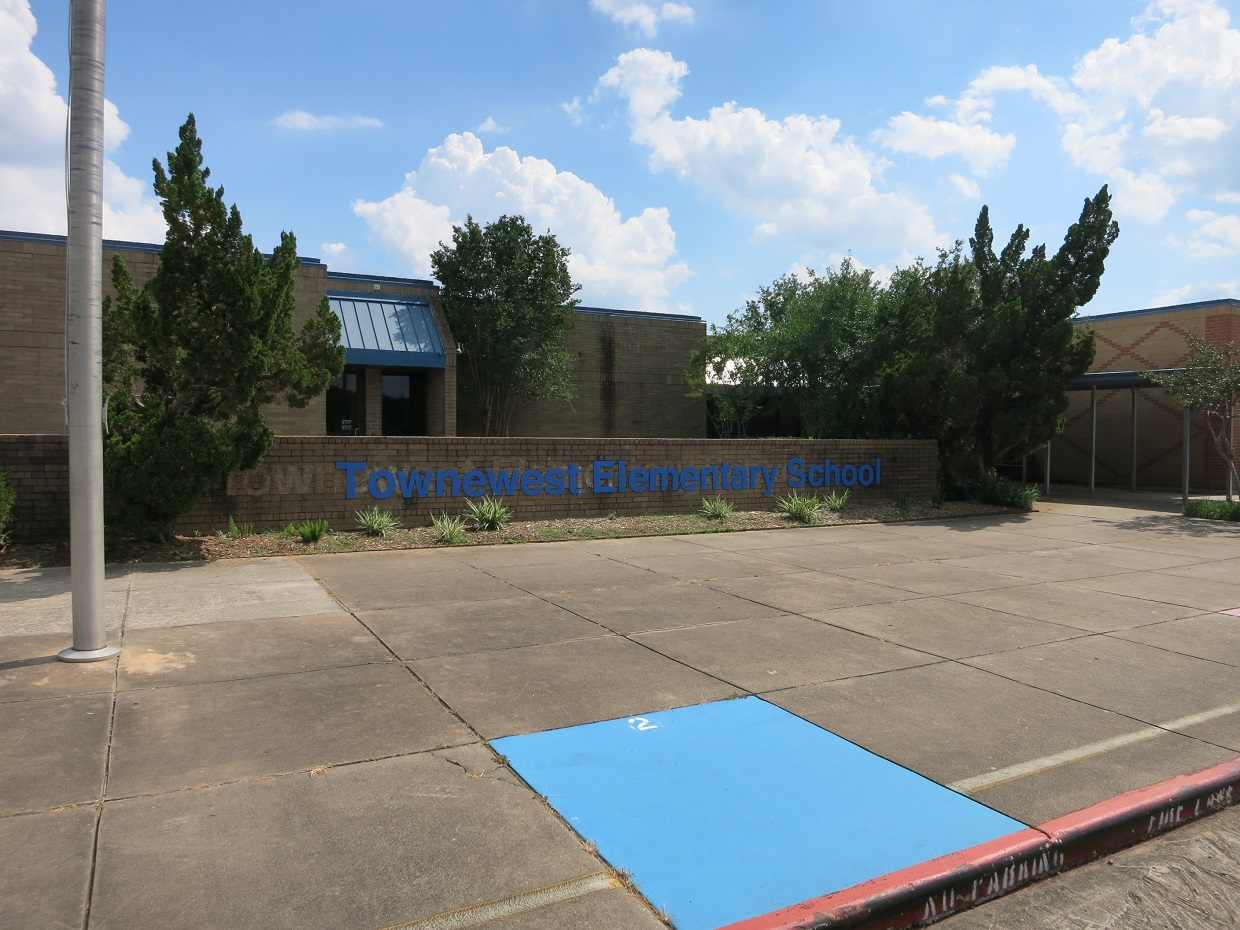
Townewest Elementary School

The former CDP is in the Fort Bend Independent School District.

Much of the former CDP is zoned to: Townewest Elementary School. A portion to the southwest is zoned to Sugar Mill Elementary School and a portion to the southeast is zoned to Barrington Place Elementary School. All residents are zoned to Sugar Land Middle School and Kempner High School.

The Texas Legislature specifies that the Houston Community College (HCC) boundary includes "the part of the Fort Bend Independent School District that is not located in the service area of the Wharton County Junior College District and that is adjacent to the Houston Community College System District." Wharton College's boundary within FBISD is defined only as the City of Sugar Land and the ETJ of Sugar Land, and Town West is not in the Sugar Land ETJ. Town West is in HCC.

== Demographics ==
Historical population
Census	Pop.	Note	%±
1990	6,166		—
U.S. Decennial Census; 1850–1900 1910; 1920 1930 1940; 1950 1960 1970; 1980 1990 2000; 2010 2020
