= Lyda Ann Thomas =

American politician (1936–2017)

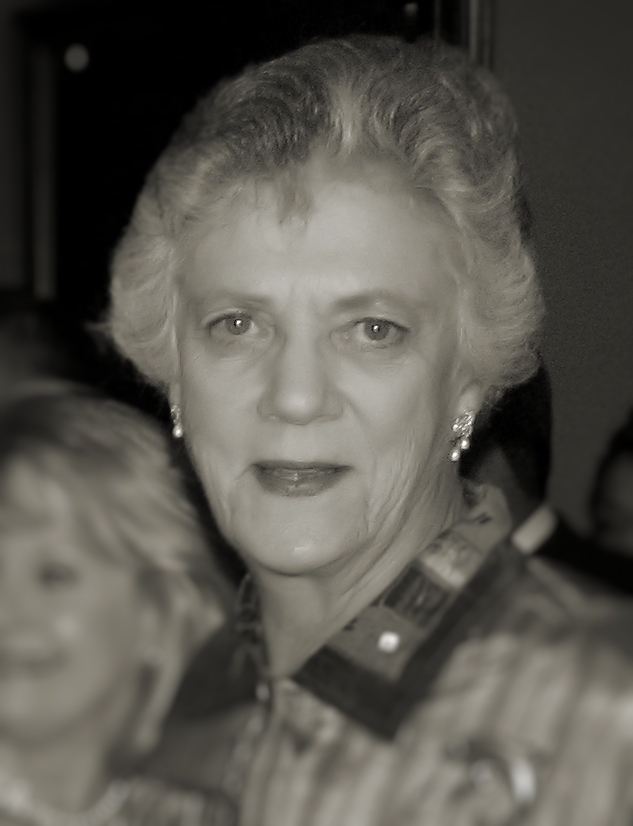

Mayor of Galveston
- In office 2004–2010
- Preceded by: Roger Reuben Quiroga
- Succeeded by: Joe Jaworski

Personal details
- Born: Lyda Ann Quinn; November 20, 1936 Galveston, Texas, U.S.
- Died: April 19, 2017 (aged 80) Galveston, Texas, U.S.
- Party: Democratic
- Profession: President of Thomas & Company of Galveston, Inc

Lyda Ann Thomas (née Quinn; November 20, 1936 – April 19, 2017) was an American politician and businesswoman. She was first elected in 2004 as Mayor of Galveston to succeed Roger Reuben "Bo" Quiroga. She was the third female mayor of Galveston and served until 2010.

== Education and politics ==
The eldest child of Arthur William and Lyda Kempner Quinn, she attended The Hockaday School in Dallas. She lived in New York City during the early years of her marriage from 1956 to 1972. She attended the University of Texas at Austin and pledged Kappa Kappa Gamma sorority, concluding her formal education at Columbia University.

Elected to the Galveston City Council in 1998, she served her three-term limit. In 2004 she was elected Mayor of Galveston. Thomas proceeded to serve three terms as mayor, and stepped down in 2010 after reaching her city-imposed term-limit.

== Hurricane Rita ==
On September 20, 2005, during Hurricane Rita, Thomas declared a state of emergency and ordered an evacuation effective 6 PM the following day. When added to the panicked flight from Houston, this exacerbated the congestion in the area. She was however praised for her caution, receiving the 2007 National Blueprint Best Practices Award from the National Council on Readiness & Preparedness.

== Hurricane Ike ==
On August 4, 2008, when Tropical Storm Edouard came ashore, Thomas limited her statements to a warning. When Hurricane Ike approached Galveston, on September 10 at noon Thomas said that although she did not expect to be ordering an evacuation, she asked for a voluntary evacuation of the western part of the island.

At 5 PM this hardened to a mandatory order and she suggested voluntary evacuation for the rest of the island. Thomas ordered the full evacuation 9:30 AM on September 11, in a news conference with Galveston County Judge Jim Yarbrough. She told the media at the time that she had wanted to avoid an evacuation order.

== Death ==
Thomas died on April 19, 2017, at the age of 80 from uterine cancer. She had previously treated successfully for colorectal cancer in 1998. She was the mother of four children (one of whom predeceased her) and the grandmother of two.

Political offices
Preceded by Roger Reuben "Bo" Quiroga	Mayor of Galveston; 2004 – 2010	Succeeded by Joe Jaworski
