= Mayor of Galveston =

The mayor of Galveston is the official head of the city of Galveston in the U.S. state of Texas. The incumbent mayor is Craig Brown, who was elected in 2020, re-elected in 2022, and was re-elected to another three-year term on May 4, 2024. He took office in July 2020, succeeding the previous mayor, Jim Yarbrough.

== History ==
Local politics in Galveston have a tradition of being nonpartisan. There are no party labels on local ballots.

=== Commission government ===
When Galveston originated the commission form of government, starting the year 1901, the mayor officially held the title of "Mayor-President" and was president of the board of commissioners. Galveston's first mayor under the commission system was William T. Austin, who served for four years.

=== Council-manager government ===
The city of Galveston has had a council-manager system of government since its adoption of the form in 1961.

== List of mayors and mayor-presidents of the board of commissioners ==
Below is a list of Galveston's mayors and presidents of the Board of Commissioners.

No.	Image	Mayor	Term start	Term end	Party	Note
1		John Melville Allen	March 1839	June 1840	Democratic	First Mayor of Galveston
2		John H. Walton	June 1840	May 1841	—N/a	
3		John Melville Allen	1841	1842	Democratic	
4		James M. Branham	1842	1843	—N/a	Announced a curfew for all blacks, free and slave, in the city of Galveston that prohibited being in public after 8pm without a permit and forbade being in public after 10pm in all cases.
5		John Melville Allen	1843	1846	Democratic	
6		John Seabrook Sydnor	1846	1847	—N/a	Plantation owner that operated "the largest slave market west of New Orleans in the heart of Galveston".
7		Joseph Bates	1848	1848	Whig	Fought in the Second Seminole War, was a representative of the Alabama legislature.
8		Hamilton Stuart	1849	1852	Democratic	Founder of the Galveston Civilian, once argued "that the products of slave labor sustain the commerce of the world, civilization and Christianity."
9		Michael Seeligson	1853	June 1853	—N/a	Resigned in June.
10		Willard B. Richardson	1853	1854	—N/a	Mayor pro tempore, editor, partner and proprietor of the Galveston News.
11		James Cronican	1854	1855	—N/a	Had previously represented the district of Galveston in the First Texas Legislature from February 1846 to December 1847.
12		James Edward Haviland	1855	1856	—N/a	
13		John Henry Brown	1856	1857	Democratic	Later became the mayor of Dallas.
14		Thomas Miller Joseph	1858	1862	Democratic	Leslie A. Thompson was claimed to be the mayor in 1858 in some later sources. However, he is only mentioned as a city alderman in 1856 and 1857.
		Vacant	1863	1863		
15		Charles Henry Leonard	1864	1867	Democratic	Former soldier of the Texian Army, fought to suppress the Córdova Rebellion and Native American revolts in 1838 under General Rusk.
16		J. C. Haviland	1867	June 17, 1867	—N/a	Major General Charles Griffin, commander of the Fifth Military District, ordered Haviland to disband the city's entire police force. Haviland was removed from office by Griffin as he was considered "an impediment to reconstruction" on June 17, 1867.
17		Isaac G. Williams	1867	1869	—N/a	Appointed to fill the vacancy after Haviland was removed from office.
18		James A. McKee	1869	March 6, 1871	Republican	
19		Albert Somerville	June 5, 1871	1873	—N/a	
20		Charles W. Hurley	1873	1875	—N/a	
21		Robert L. Fulton	1875	1877	Democratic	
22		D. C. Stone	1877	1879	—N/a	
23		Charles Henry Leonard	1879	1881	Democratic	
24		L. C. Fisher	1881	1883	—N/a	
25		Robert L. Fulton	1883	1893	Democratic	
26		Ashley Wilson Fly	1893	1899	—N/a	
27		Walter Charles Jones	1899	1900	—N/a	Mayor during the Great Storm of 1900.
28		William T. Austin	1901	1905	—N/a	First mayor under the commission plan. Died in office.
29		Henry A. Landes	1905	1909	—N/a	Elected as mayor-president after Austin's death.
30		Lewis Dallam Fisher	1909	1917	—N/a	Under his administration the seawall was first built.
31		Isaac Herbert Kempner	1917	1919	—N/a	Early advocate of the commission form of government.
32		Harry O. Sappington	1919	1921	—N/a	
33		Charles H. Keenan	1921	1923	—N/a	
34		Baylis Earle Harriss	1923	1925	—N/a	
35		John Elias Pearce	1925	1935	—N/a	
36		Adrian F. Levy	1935	1939	—N/a	
37		Brantly Callaway Harris	1939	1942	—N/a	
38		Henry W. Flagg	1942	1943	—N/a	
39		George W. Frazer	1943	1947	—N/a	
40		Herbert Yemon Cartwright Jr.	1947	1955	—N/a	
41		George Roy Clough	1955	1959	—N/a	
42		Herbert Yemon Cartwright Jr.	1959	1960	—N/a	
43		Edward Schreiber	1961	1962	—N/a	
44		Theodore B. Stubbs	1962	1963	—N/a	
45		Edward Schreiber	1964	1970	—N/a	
46		Marcus Lamar Ross	1971	1973	—N/a	
47		Ralph Albert Apfell	1973	1977	—N/a	
48		Elias "Gus" Manuel	1978	February 2, 1984	—N/a	Died in office.
49		Janice Reddig Coggeshall	1984	1989	—N/a	
50		Barbara Krantz Crews	1990	1996	—N/a	
51		Henry Freudenburg III	1996	1998	—N/a	
52		Roger Reuben "Bo" Quiroga	1998	2004	—N/a	
53		Lyda Ann Thomas	2004	2010	—N/a	
54		Joe Jaworski	2010	2012	Democratic	
55		Lewis S. Rosen	June 22, 2012	2014	—N/a	
56		James D. "Jim" Yarbrough	2014	July 15, 2020	Democratic	
57		Craig K. Brown	July 2020	July 2026	—N/a	
58		John Paul Listowski	July 2026	Present	Republican	
