= Harris Kempner (b. 1837) =

Merchant in Galveston, Texas

- Born: March 7, 1837; Krzepitz, Poland
- Died: April 13, 1894 (aged 57); Galveston, Texas, U.S.
- Occupations: Merchant; Philanthropist
- Spouse: Eliza Seinsheimer
- Children: Isaac Herbert Kempner plus eight

Harris Kempner (March 7, 1837−April 13, 1894) was born in Krzepitz, Poland. He immigrated to the United States in 1854, entering through the port of New York City, but continuing to Texas after a brief stay. He worked as a peddler in the 1850s, before volunteering for the Confederate States Army. He returned to Texas and built his wealth as a merchant in the 1870s and 1880s.

== Early life ==
Kempner was born on March 7, 1837, in Krzepitz, Poland, then under Russian rule.

Kempner immigrated to New York City in 1854, where he was briefly learning the trade of bricklaying. The next year, he moved west to rural San Jacinto County, Texas, where he earned a living as a peddler.

== Career ==
While Kempner did not own enslaved persons, he never expressed any abolitionist sentiments and he even volunteered with the Ellis County Blues, a unit under the command of Parsons's 12th Texas Cavalry. Kempner was wounded in Louisiana when a cannon shot struck his horse in the neck. After he recovered from his injuries, he volunteered for further duty, but his application for service was rejected. There is no evidence, however, that Kempner invested significant financial resources in the confederate cause.

After the war, Kempner returned to Cold Springs, San Jacinto County, Texas, where he resumed business as a merchant and expanded his market. By 1869, one agent for R.G. Dun estimated Kemper's wealth at $9−10,000. He operated that store until 1871, when he sold it to prepare for a move to Galveston, where his prospects were better for business growth, a social life, and a chance to live among other Jews.

By 1871, Galveston grew into a city of commerce, fine streets, and a Jewish community with a consecrated cemetery and a new synagogue. There he met Marx Marx, a popular and financially successful grocer and liquor wholesaler. Marx made Kempner his junior partner in the business in 1872. Their wholesale trade grew so fast that they were able to build a larger store, pay off the mortgage for it early, and have access to a credit line of $100,000. As the Panic of 1873 threatened the United States, Marx and Kempner could draw on their own reserves.

== Personal life ==
Kempner traveled to New York on business in 1871. At the hotel where he stayed, he met Eliza Seinsheimer, a German-Jewish woman from a prosperous family in Cincinnati. Kempner switched to Cincinnati vendors for his next business trip, where he proposed marriage to Seinsheimer, and they married March 6, 1872. The young couple resided in Galveston, but Eliza Kempner returned to Cincinnati during her first pregnancy, where Isaac Herbert Kempner was born on January 14, 1873. The Kempners had four other sons and four daughters who reached maturity, in addition to three sons who died during childhood. Their first residence was located at the corner of M Street and Twentieth Street.

== Death and legacy ==
Kempner in his final years suffered from Bright's disease and died in Galveston on April 13, 1894. At his death, his estate was valued at over $1 million.

The Kempner family honored Harris and Eliza Kempner with a foundation named the Harris and Eliza Kempner Fund in 1946 with an original endowment of $38,500. This foundation makes grants to promote causes in the Galveston area, but also makes grants to national Jewish groups. The endowment grew to more than $32 million.

== Bibliography ==
- Hyman, Harold M. (1990). Oleander Odyssey: The Kempners of Galveston, Texas, 1854−1980s. College Station, TX: Texas A&M University Press. ISBN 0-89096-438-6.
- Stone, Bryan Edward. The Chosen Folks: Jews on the Frontiers of Texas. Austin: University of Texas Press. ISBN 978-0-292-72177-7.
