= Imperial Sugar =

Major international sugar company

Imperial Sugar Company
- Type: Subsidiary
- Traded as: Nasdaq: IPSU
- Industry: Food industry
- Founded: 1843; 183 years ago
- Founder: Samuel May Williams
- Headquarters: Sugar Land, Texas, United States
- Products: Sugar
- Revenue: US$848,000,000 (2011)
- Operating income: US$50,200,000 (2011)
- Net income: US$53,400,000 (2011)
- Total assets: US$490,000,000 (2011)
- Parent: U.S. Sugar
- Website: www.imperialsugar.com

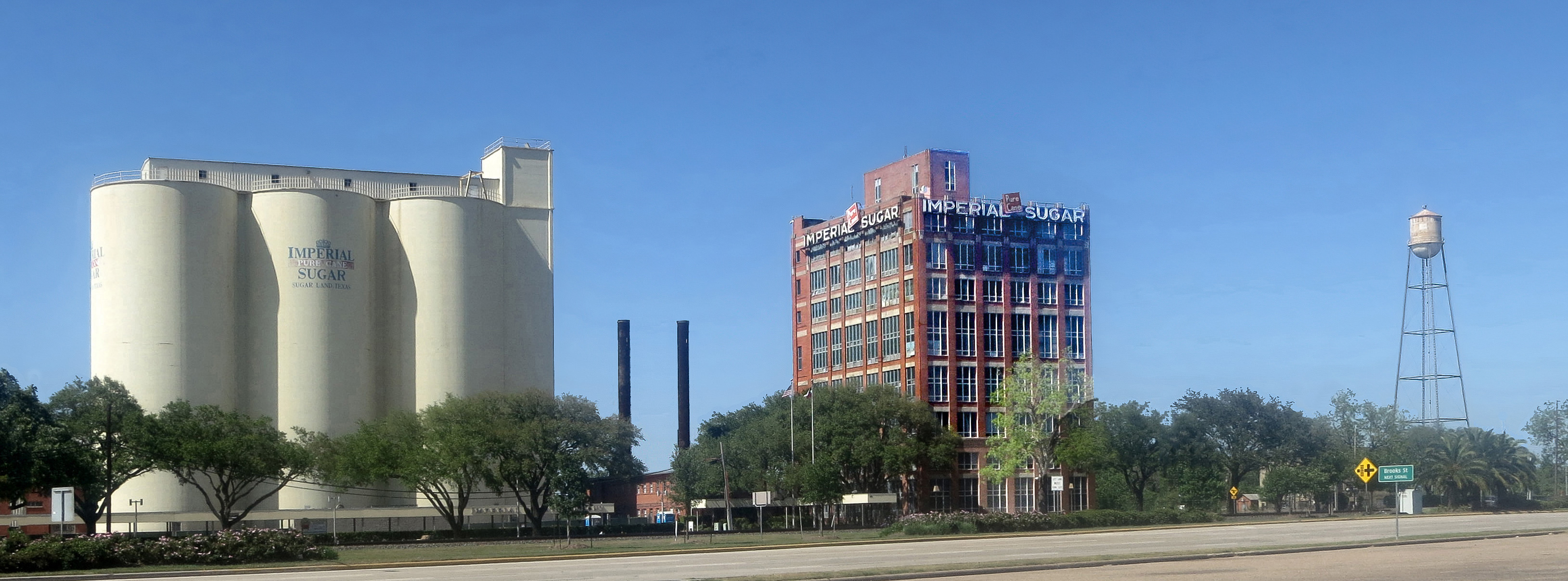
The old Sugar Land Refinery in Sugar Land, Texas

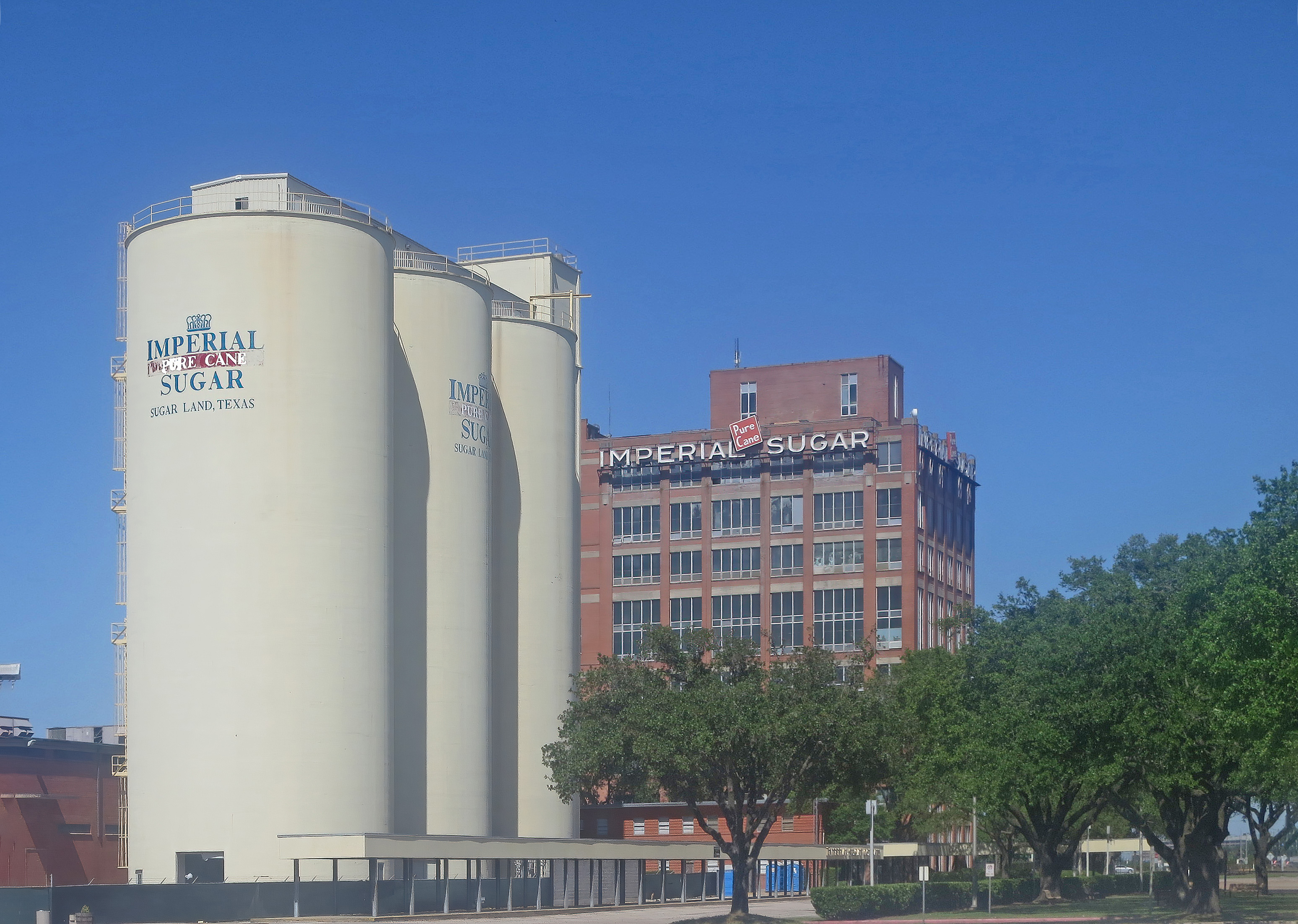
The former Sugar Land Refinery in Sugar Land, Texas

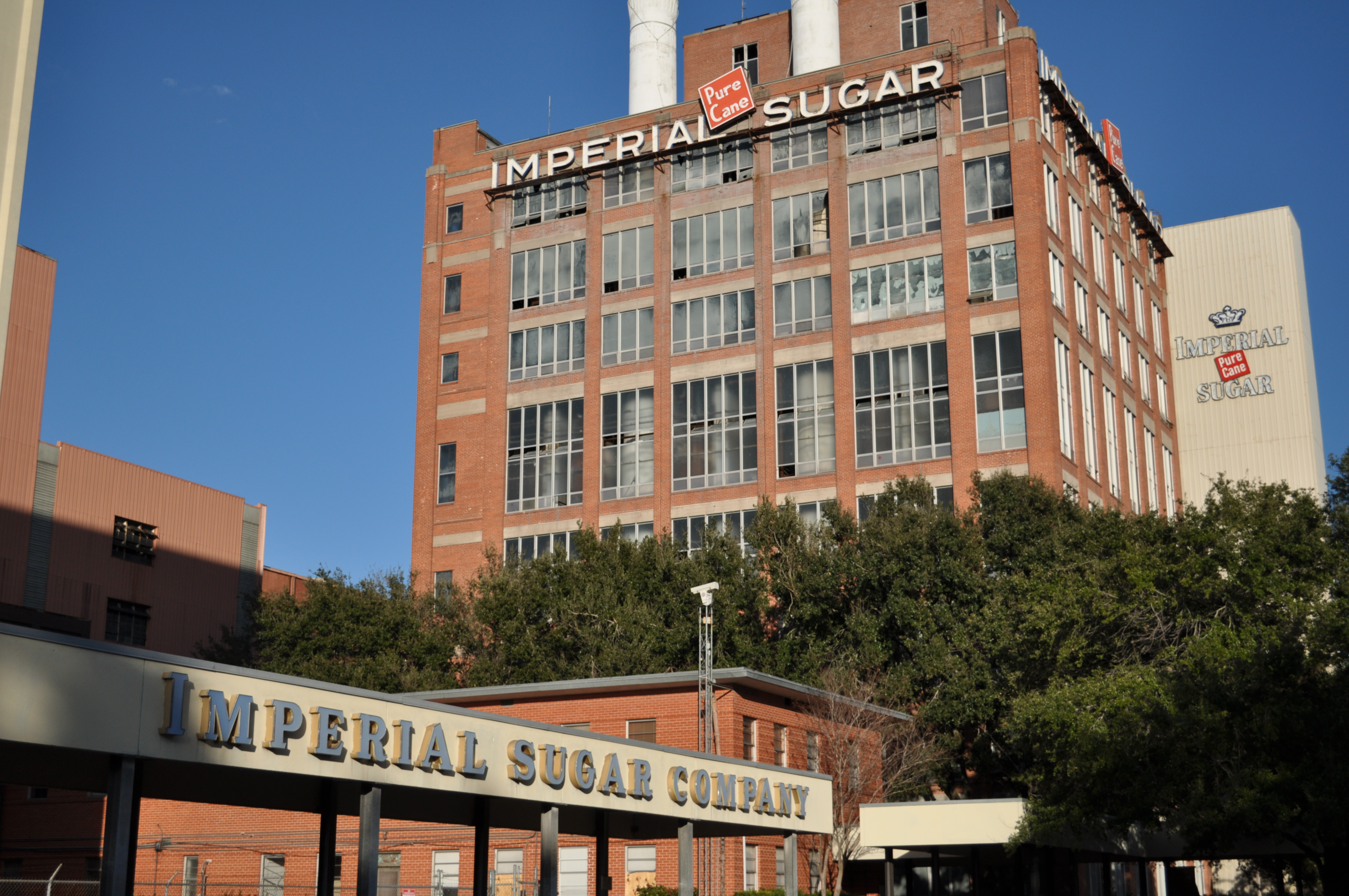
The former Imperial Sugar factory in Sugar Land, Texas

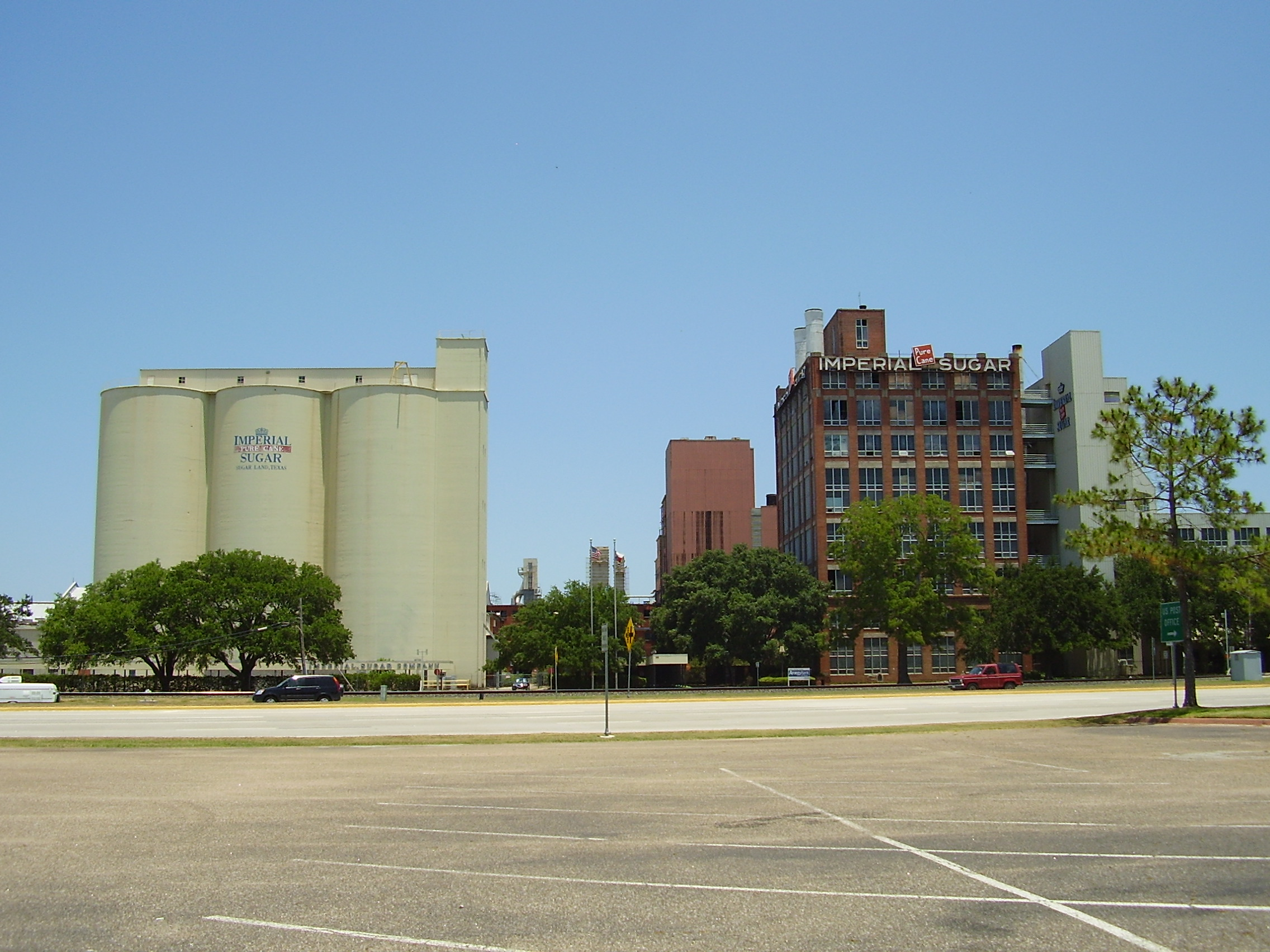
Another view of the sugar factory in Sugar Land

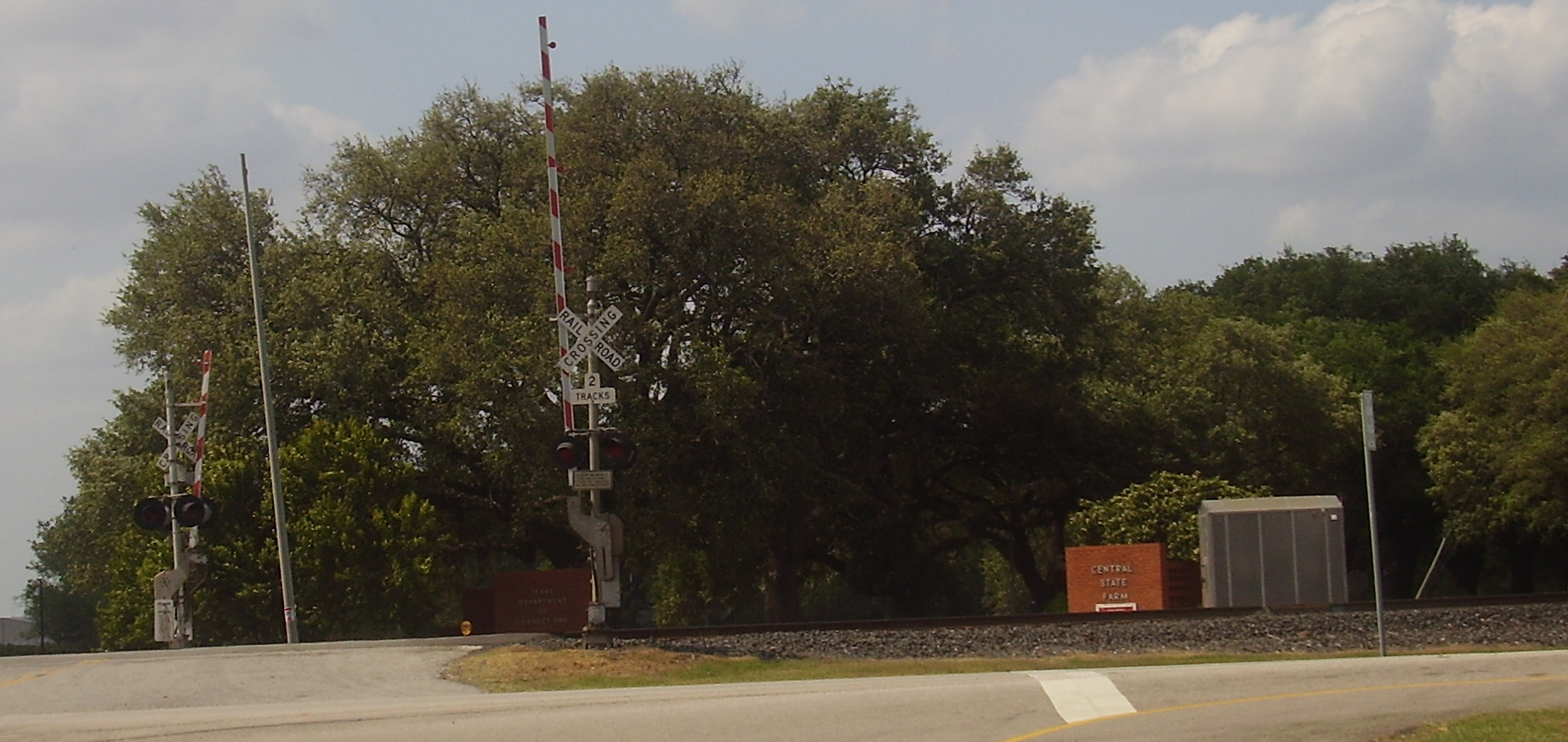
The state of Texas purchased the property of the Central Unit (Imperial State Farm) from Imperial Sugar

Imperial Sugar Company is a major U.S. sugar producer and marketer based in Sugar Land, Texas, with sugar refinery operations in California, Georgia, and Louisiana. The company was established in 1843 and has undergone ownership changes multiple times. The current name, Imperial Sugar Company, was established after a change in ownership in 1907. The company went through major expansion through acquisitions beginning in 1988, but filed for bankruptcy in 2001, emerging in the same year and embarking on a downsizing strategy. In May 2012, the company was purchased by Louis Dreyfus Group of the Netherlands. In November 2022, Dreyfus sold Imperial to U.S. Sugar.

== History ==
The company has been headquartered in Sugar Land since its inception. The city itself is named for the company and the company's crown logo is featured in the city's seal. The company was founded in 1843 by Samuel May Williams and passed through a series of owners until its purchase in 1907 by the I. H. Kempner family of Galveston. The company was later renamed the Imperial Sugar Company, in an effort to emphasize quality. Up until 1988 the company had only one plant, at its original location in Texas, when they purchased the Holly Sugar Corporation, a sugar beet processor headquartered in Colorado Springs. At that time Imperial Sugar Company became Imperial Holly Corporation and began publicly trading on Nasdaq.

Since the merger with Holly, the company made several more acquisitions that greatly enlarged the company during the 1980s and 1990s, including Michigan Sugar and the Spreckels Sugar Company. However, the company's name returned to Imperial Sugar Company in 1999.

On January 17, 2001, the company filed for Chapter 11 bankruptcy protection, attributing its problems to lower sales for refined sugar as well as higher energy costs. Then on August 29, 2001, the company emerged from Chapter 11 and turned its focus inward as it downsized its operations. In 2001, it divested itself of Michigan Sugar, which became an independent cooperative. In 2003, it closed its original plant in Sugar Land, TX, but its corporate headquarters are still located in its founding city; several of the factory buildings underwent demolition by building implosion in 2010. In 2005, it sold Holly Sugar Corporation (which included Spreckels Sugar) to the Southern Minnesota Beet Sugar Cooperative (SMBSC). However, Imperial retained the trademark to the Holly Sugar brand, and SMBSC rebranded Holly Sugar Corporation to Spreckels Sugar Company. In 2010, Imperial exchanged its aging nineteenth-century Gramercy, Louisiana refinery to Louisiana Sugar Refiners, LLC (LSR) for a one-third interest in the new company. LSR commenced operations on January 1, 2011. Imperial continues to operate a small-bag processing facility at Gramercy.

=== 2008 explosion ===
On February 7, 2008, an explosion at a Port Wentworth, Georgia, sugar refinery killed 14 people and injured more than 40. It was likely caused by an overheated bearing on a conveyor beneath the sugar silos, which ignited sugar dust, then spread in a chain reaction of sugar dust explosions in the finished-sugar packaging area of the plant. OSHA had been criticized in a 2006 U.S. Chemical Safety Board report for lack of preparation for such explosions and a safety program that "inadequately addresses dust explosion hazards". As of August 26, 2008, the death toll had risen to 14, with one still in critical condition.

The plant, originally built as the Dixie Crystals sugar refinery in 1916–1917, had been acquired by Imperial Sugar in 1997. At the time of its purchase, the Port Wentworth refinery was the second-largest sugar refining operation in the U.S.

=== Acquisition by Louis Dreyfus Group ===
On 1 May 2012, Louis Dreyfus Commodities LLC announced that one of its subsidiaries would acquire all outstanding Imperial Sugar stock for $6.35 per share and assume $125 million in Imperial Sugar debt. The price per share represented a 57% premium over Imperial Sugar's closing price on 30 April. A spokesman for Dreyfus group said the acquisition was part of the company's efforts to expand into refining and distribution of sugar.

=== Acquisition by U.S. Sugar ===
In November 2021, US Sugar and Imperial Sugar announced their intentions to merge the two companies. They were sued by the US Department of Justice who claimed in a statement that the deal was anticompetitive and would “leave an overwhelming majority of refined sugar sales across the Southeast in the hands of only two producers”. Imperial Sugar and US Sugar stated that they disagreed with the antitrust lawsuit and that they fully intended to litigate.

US Sugar completed the $315 million purchase of Imperial in November 2022.

On July 13, 2023, the 3rd U.S. Circuit Court of Appeals in Philadelphia rejected the U.S. government's claim that the merger violated antitrust and refused to undo the merger.

== Gallery ==
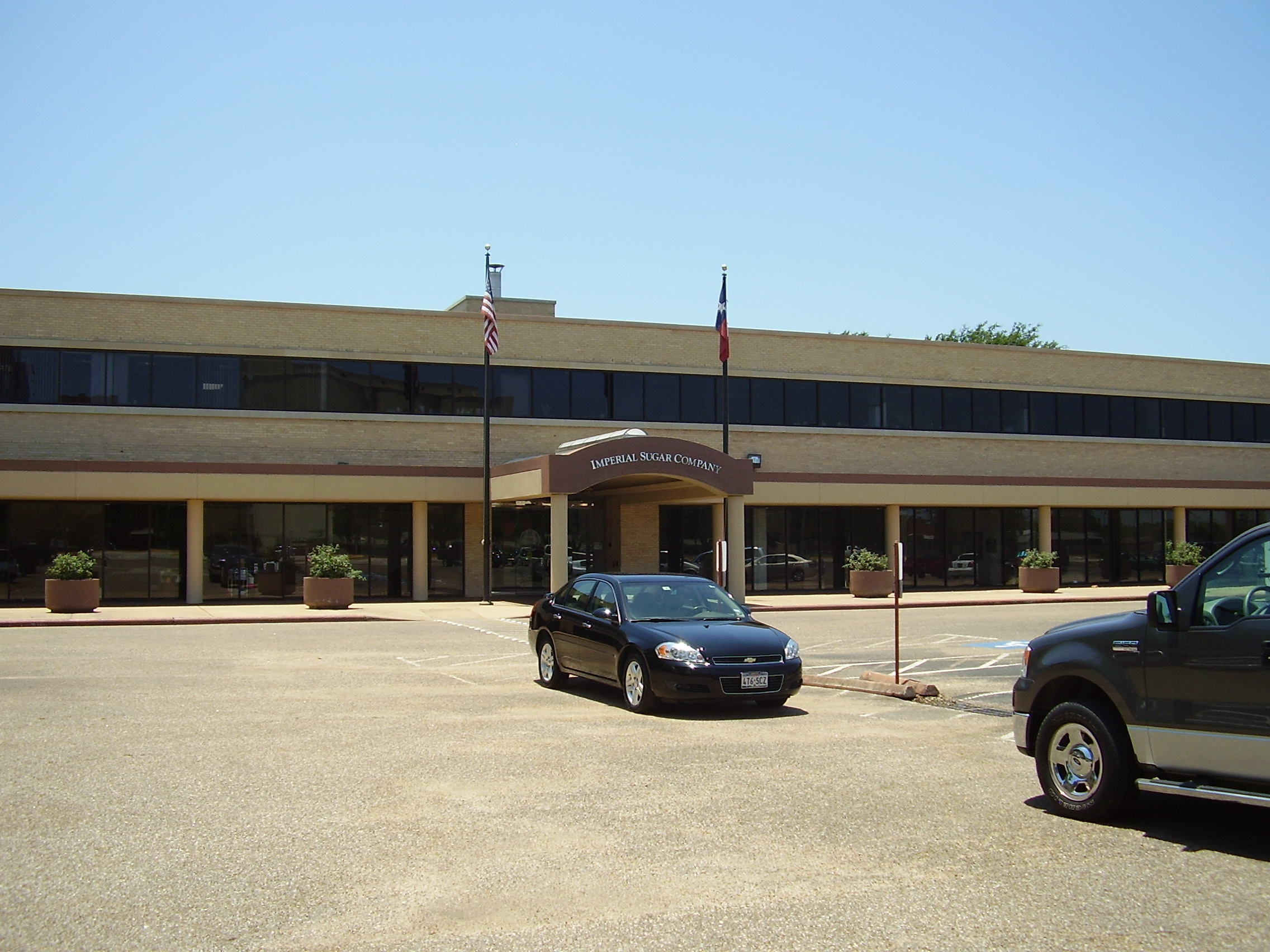
Imperial Sugar offices in Sugar Land

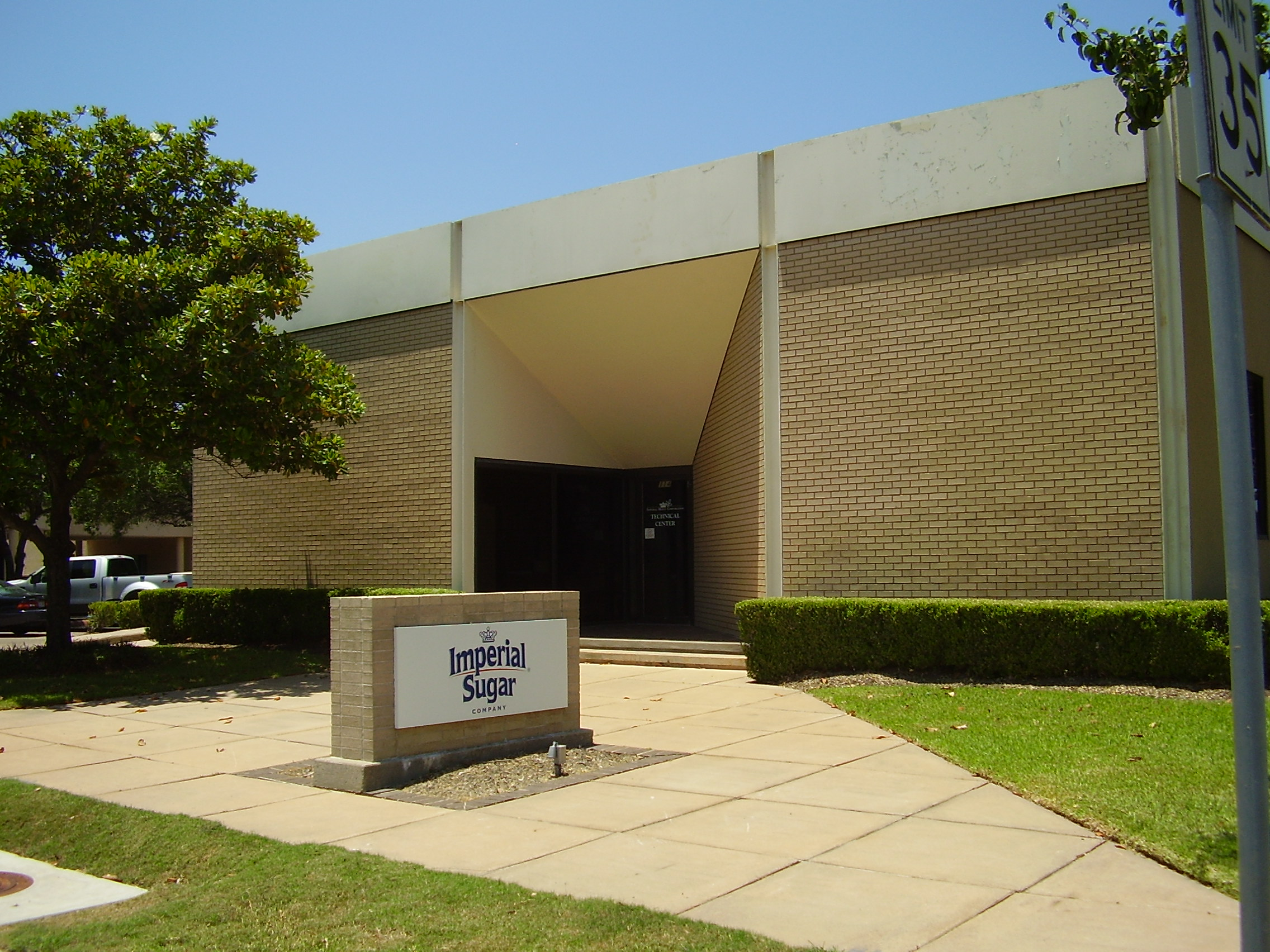
Imperial Sugar Technology Center in Sugar Land
