= Cappy (juice) =

Fruit flavored soft drink

- Type: Fruit juice
- Manufacturer: The Coca-Cola Company
- Variants: Cappy Selectii, Cappy Ice Fruit
- Related products: Minute Maid; Fruitopia; Simply Beverages; Hi-C
- Website: www.cappy.pl

Cappy is a fruit juice and fruit-flavored soft drink brand in over 25 countries, in Europe, Africa and Asia, now owned by The Coca-Cola Company.

== Products ==
A new juice variant called Cappy Selectii was introduced in 2003 in response to local demand for more higher quality products and natural flavours. It contains more than 99 per cent natural juice and no added sugar. Cappy Selectii is also known as Cappy Juice in some countries.

In July 2008 The Coca-Cola Company launched in Poland new noncarbonated beverage Cappy Ice Fruit.

=== Flavours ===
Apple, Apple Apricot Orange, Apple Mint, Apple Peach, Apple Pear, Apricot, Cherry, Citrus Blend, Citrus Orange, Currant, Exotic, Fruit Punch, Grape, Grapefruit, Grapefruit Orange, Grapefruit and Lychee, Kiwi Lemon, Lemon, Multivitamin, Nectarine, Orange, Orange Pineapple, Orange Tangerine, Orange Tangerine Lemon, Peach, Pear, Pineapple, Red Fruits, Sour Cherry, Strawberry, Tomato, and Watermelon.

The brand also has a breakfast blend and more in the South African variation.

== Availability ==
Cappy juices can be found in Albania, Austria, Azerbaijan, Bosnia and Herzegovina, Bulgaria, Croatia, Cyprus, Czech Republic, Estonia, Georgia, Hungary, Italy, Kazakhstan, Latvia, Lithuania, Malta, Moldova, North Macedonia, Palestinian Authority, Poland, Romania, Serbia, Slovakia, Slovenia, South Africa, Sudan, Nigeria, Turkey, Ukraine, Egypt, Pakistan, Jordan and Morocco.

== See also ==
- Minute Maid
- Fruitopia
