= This Is Bing Crosby =

American radio program

This Is Bing Crosby was a fifteen-minute, daily daytime radio program featuring Bing Crosby acting as a disc jockey. Minute Maid quick frozen concentrated orange juice was promoted on the shows.

== Background ==
Frozen orange juice was developed by necessity for troops during the war by National Research Corporation. In the late 1940s, Vacuum Foods Corporation, who were marketing the Minute Maid brand, wanted to educate the public and stimulate sales. An original investor in Vacuum Foods was Jock Whitney, a wealthy sportsman who had met Bing Crosby in horse racing circles. During a round of golf in spring 1948, Whitney told Crosby about the frozen orange juice concentrate and a deal was made. Crosby became a director of Vacuum Foods, and he bought 20,000 shares of stock at the advantageous price of 10 cents a share. He agreed, at an undisclosed salary, to plug the juice on a transcribed song and chat program five days a week and Philco Corporation, which had Crosby under exclusive contract, agreed on the basis that the singer would slip in mentions of Philco products during the shows. This arrangement enabled Vacuum Foods to obtain Crosby's services at a reasonable cost and for Crosby it offered the chance of a substantial long-term capital gain on the shares.

== The program ==
The first show was broadcast on November 22, 1948, initially in the 9:45–10:00 a.m. slot, and a number of different stations took the show with a variety of sponsors as well as Vacuum Foods. Between records, which were mostly Crosby recordings, the singer and Ken Carpenter talked of frozen orange juice, as an acceptable alternate, and Minute Maid became a household word with sales in excess of $100 million within a few years. Crosby's financial adviser, Basil Grillo, set up Bing Crosby Entertainment as producer and had Crosby work for union scale, again a matter of taxation. Writer Norman Wolfe opined, “The program for Minute Maid occasioned some amusement in the press because of his long standing feud with disk jockeys over saturating the airwaves with his music. Suddenly he was one of them, playing three or four of his own records, in a 15–minute format, each morning Monday through Friday.”

Crosby taped the shows well in advance with help from engineer Jack Mullin and writer Bill Morrow. The last show was broadcast on October 27, 1950.

== Reception ==
Variety magazine did not normally review disc-jockey programs but on this occasion, because of Crosby's involvement, they commented:

The opening program on Monday (22nd) had Crosby singing a new song and playing one of his old disks and to show his generosity, as well as good showmanship, playing an Ella Fitzgerald recording too. Crosby also did his own commercials, valiantly plugging frozen orange juice and doing a better job of it than announcer, Ken Carpenter. Met soprano, Dorothy Kirsten, wandered into the program to exchange a couple of words with Bing but didn’t sing anything, making the whole bit a little silly. Otherwise, this is a pleasant ayemer [a.m. program].

A few months later, The Billboard's Jerry Franken looked at the program too.

Whether Bing Crosby is as good a salesman as he is a performer may well be determined via his new platter disk jockey show for Minute Maid quick frozen orange juice, for in addition to doing the deejay assignment, Ole Wart-Larynx is also rendering a mighty pitch for Minute Maid. They’re done in his customary off-the-sleeve style of verbiage, directly at the hausfrauen calculated to be listening to his daytime effort. In one sense, this may be almost mandatory, since the program needs every angle possible to differentiate it from the Crosby-less Crosby platter sessions aired by so many stations. Irrespective of the sales palaver, tho, the Crosby introductions to the records, the tunes chosen (he doesn’t limit them to his own) and the inimitable Groaner style should emerge as a potent daytime session. Ken Carpenter is on hand with his usual nifty assist and the two combine to do an easy-to-take selling job on the juice as its edge over the competish."

When he went to Europe in 1950, he described some of the places he visited, leading columnist John Crosby to comment:

I don’t know how many of you have been catching “This Is Bing Crosby”, a 15-minute transcribed daytime show, dedicated to the proposition that every man, woman and child ought to drink more Minute Maid Orange Juice. Anyhow, Mr. Crosby has been devoting much of the quarter-hour to a recital of his adventures in Europe with wit, charm and a surprising perceptiveness. If you can't fit Europe into your schedule this summer, the Crosby travel diary is about the best vicarious trip around."

== Related matters ==
The Minute Maid Corporation was the first new stock to be floated on the New York Stock Exchange in 1956; Crosby bought the first 100 shares for a total of $1,900 and then donated them to his alma mater Gonzaga University for its library appeal. He was described in press publicity as president of the Bing Crosby–Minute Maid Corporation which acts as distributor of Minute Maid products on the West Coast.

Starting in 1967, Crosby began to act as a product spokesman for Minute Maid and he and his family were seen in many televised commercials in subsequent years.
