= St James's Place (disambiguation) =

St James's Place is a street in the St James's district of London.

St James's Place or St. James Place may also refer to:

- St. James's Place plc, branded as St. James's Place Wealth Management, a British wealth management firm based in Cirencester, England
- St. James Place, the working title of the 2015 American film Bridge of Spies
- St. James Place, a property in the U.S. version of the board game Monopoly, named for a street in Atlantic City, New Jersey

== See also ==
- St James's Place Festival Hunter Chase, a National Hunt steeplechase in the United Kingdom
- 2000 St. James Place, an office building in Houston, Texas, in the United States
- St James's Palace, the most senior royal palace in the United Kingdom
- Saint James (disambiguation), a disambiguation page listing articles associated with that title
