= Mennello Museum of American Art =

Art museum in Orlando, Florida

- Location within Florida
- Established: November 22, 1998
- Location: 900 East Princeton Street; Orlando, Florida
- Coordinates: 28.57°N 81.367278°W
- Owner: City of Orlando
- Website: https://www.mennellomuseum.org/Home

The Mennello Museum of American Art is an art museum located in the Howard Phillips' house in Loch Haven Park next to Lake Formosa in Orlando, Florida. The museum displays paintings and sculptures and contains at its core a permanent collection of paintings by Earl Cunningham (1893–1977). The Cunningham collection was donated by Marilyn and Michael Mennello of Winter Park, Florida. Other exhibitions show works of traditional and contemporary American artists.

The museum opened November 22, 1998, and is owned and operated by the city of Orlando.

== Location ==
The Mennello Museum of American art is located in a museum and education focused district of Orlando, named Loch Haven Cultural Park. It is right across the street from the Orlando Science Center, the Orlando Repertory Theater, and the Orlando Museum of Art. Once a private home, the museum was donated to the city of Orlando. It is on Lake Formosa, and its grounds contain a sculpture garden which features abstract sculptures by artist Alice Aycock.

== Smithsonian accreditation ==
The Mennello Museum is a Smithsonian American Art Museum Affiliate and has presented exhibitions organized by The Smithsonian: Pop Art Prints (2016); George Catlin’s American Buffalo (2014); African American Art: Harlem Renaissance, Civil Rights Era, and Beyond, (2013); and 1934: A New Deal for Artists (2011).

== Publications ==
- Shifting Gaze
- Immersion Into Compounded Time
- Mira Lehr High Water Mark
