= First Colony =

Large Master-Planned Community in Fort Bend County, Texas

Coordinates: 29°34′29″N 95°36′31″W

- Community in Sugar Land and Missouri City; Former Census-designated place
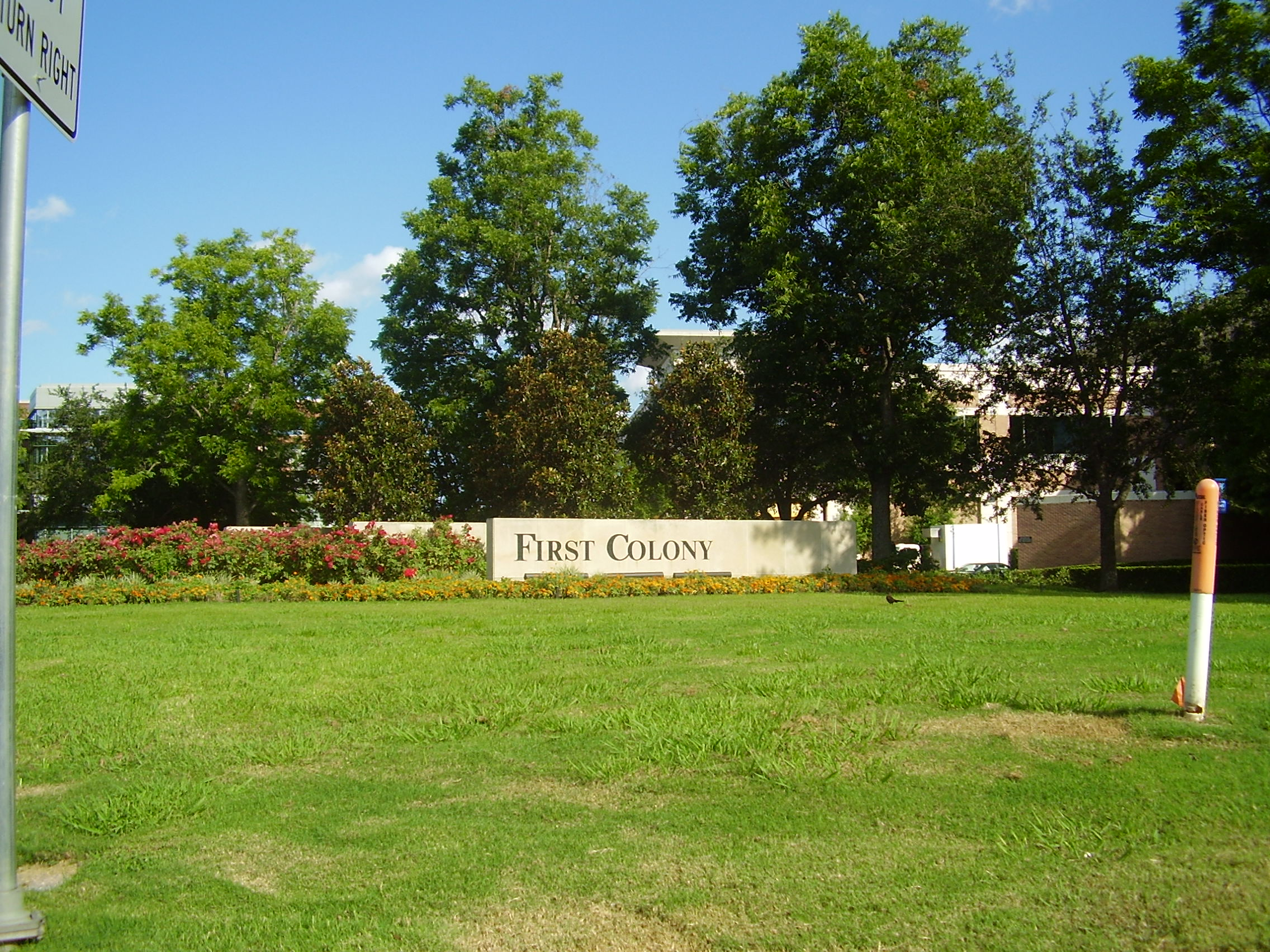
- A First Colony entrance sign

- Interactive map of First Colony
- Country: United States
- State: Texas
- County: Fort Bend County
- Cities: Sugar Land and Missouri City
- Construction started: 1976
- Development finished: 1997
- Founder: Sugarland Properties

Area
  - Total: 15 sq mi (39 km^{2})

Population
  - Total: 50,000
  - Density: 3,300/sq mi (1,300/km^{2})
- ZIP Code: 77479

First Colony is a 9,700-acre (39 km^{2}) master-planned community in Fort Bend County, Texas. The community, with approximately 50,000 residents, encompasses over 9,500 residential houses in 98 neighborhoods located across southern parts of Sugar Land with a few neighborhoods spanning into Missouri City.

== History ==
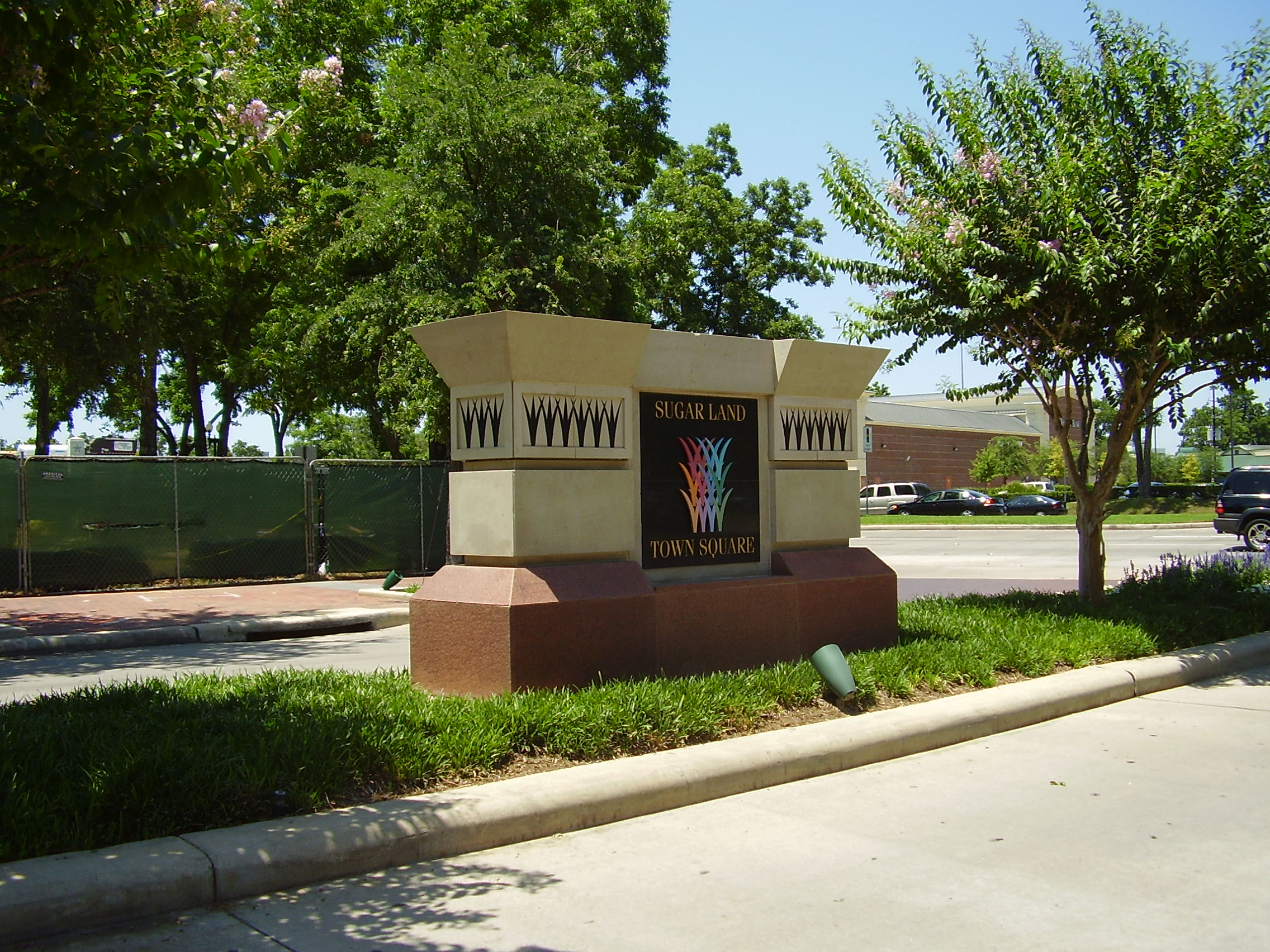
Sugar Land Town Square in Sugar Land was developed out of one of the few remaining parcels of land in First Colony

First Colony was developed by Sugarland Properties Inc.—a joint venture of Gerald D. Hines Interests and Stichting Shell Pension Fund. Hines' Sugarland group began development on First Colony in 1976.

When First Colony was under development in 1977, very little development was in the area. Bill Schadewald said that he, as a rookie real estate reporter, received speculation from local sources questioning whether "a project so large and such a distance could succeed."

The community was a census-designated place in the 1990 census, with a population of 18,327 in 5,976 housing units with a reported area of 9.3 square miles (24 km^{2}). At the time, this made First Colony CDP the 108th most populous place in Texas.

Sugar Land gradually annexed most of its portion of First Colony within its municipal boundaries during the early to mid 1990s. For instance, the annexation of Municipal Utility District (MUD) 12 in First Colony occurred on December 17, 1991; this included 1,064 acres (4.31 km^{2}), including 2,314 homes, 433 condominiums and 350,000 square feet (33,000 m^{2}) of commercial property along Texas Highway 6.

The Sugar Land Town Square, a development that began in the 2000s, was developed on one of the few remaining parcels of land in First Colony. In 2011 Schadewald said "Now: I guess it’s safe to say First Colony has been a success."

== Cityscape ==
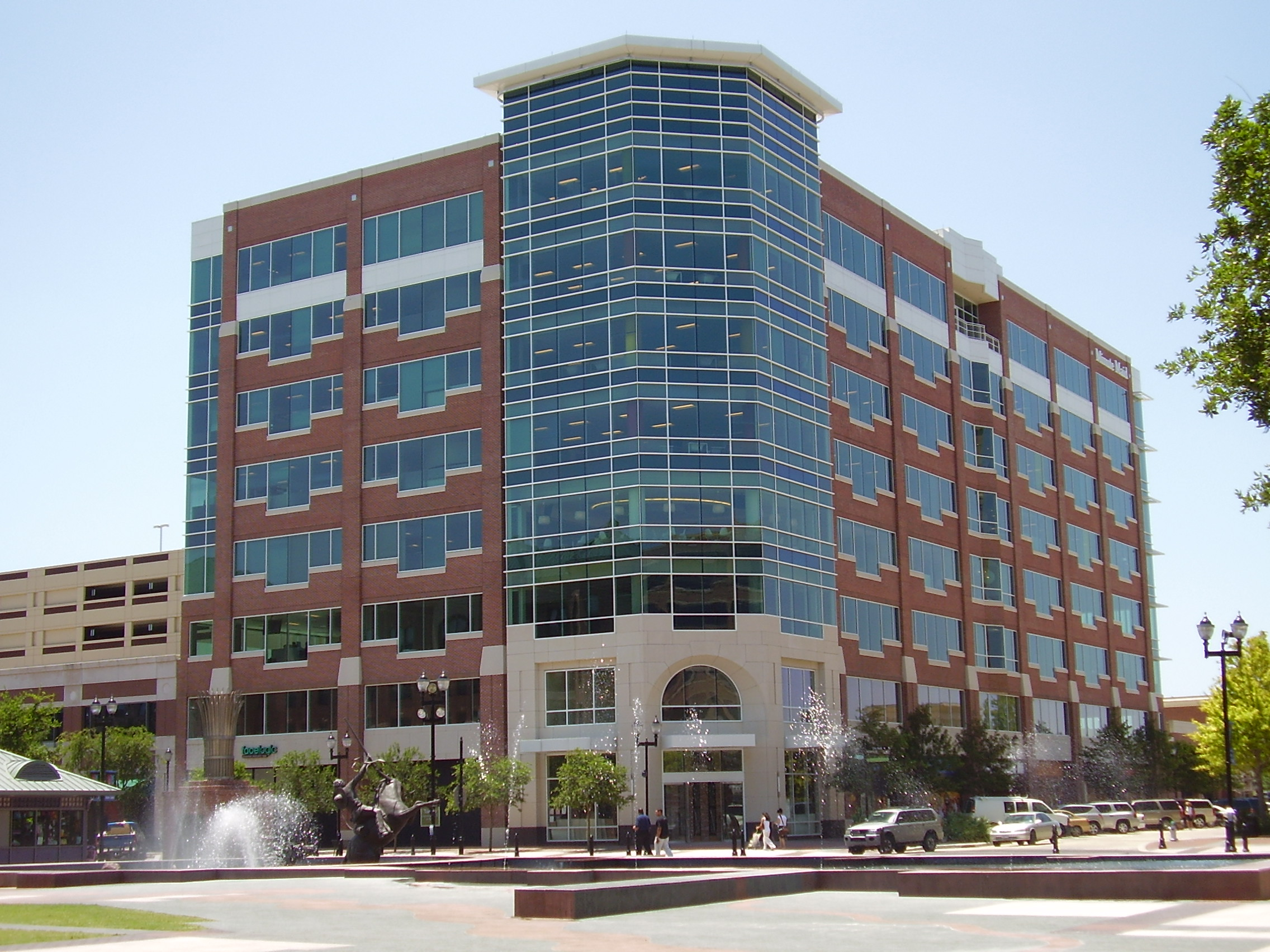
Headquarters of Minute Maid in Sugar Land Town Square

Several restrictions are placed on the development of commercial businesses. Signs of businesses within First Colony cannot be placed on poles. Exterior aesthetics common to retail businesses (from department store exteriors to restaurants) must have a brick-covered exterior and white lettering. As a result, fast food restaurants in First Colony differ in appearance from fast food restaurants in other areas. Steve Ewbank, the executive vice president of Planned Community Developers, the developer of First Colony, said that a brick shopping center in First Colony had a price tag higher by 10 to 20 percent than the price of typical shopping center.

One community located in First Colony is Sweetwater, described by Ralph Bivins of the Houston Chronicle as "upscale". In the year 1990, four very expensive houses were sold, altogether worth 1.8 million dollars (4435812.53 in today's money). In the year 1991, until July 7 of that year, 12 houses priced at over $400,000 (945516.74 in today's money) were sold, with a total of $7.1 million (16782922.06 in today's money), three times that of the 1990 total. The most expensive house that was sold in 1991 (until July 7) was a 6,900 square feet (640 m^{2}), $1.2 million (2836550.21 in today's money) house that was a replica of Melrose. It was in proximity to the Sweetwater Country Club and golf course.

== Government and infrastructure ==
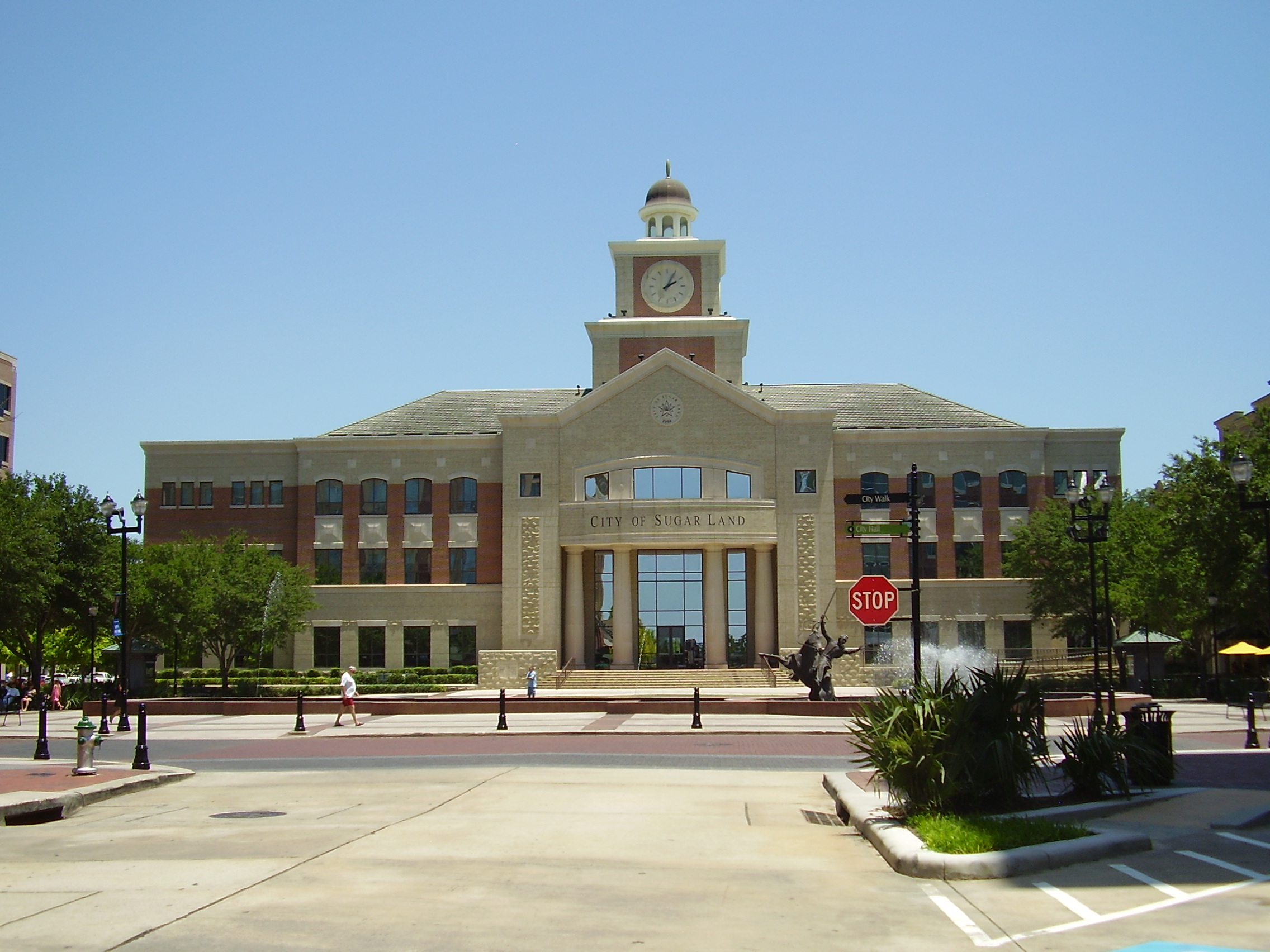
City of Sugar Land City Hall, Sugar Land Town Square

The City of Sugar Land City Hall is located in Sugar Land Town Square in First Colony.

The United States Postal Service operates the First Colony Post Office in Sugar Land.

== Economy ==
Minute Maid opened its headquarters in Sugar Land Town Square in First Colony on February 16, 2009; previously it was headquartered in 2000 St. James Place in Houston.

== Education ==
=== Primary and secondary schools ===
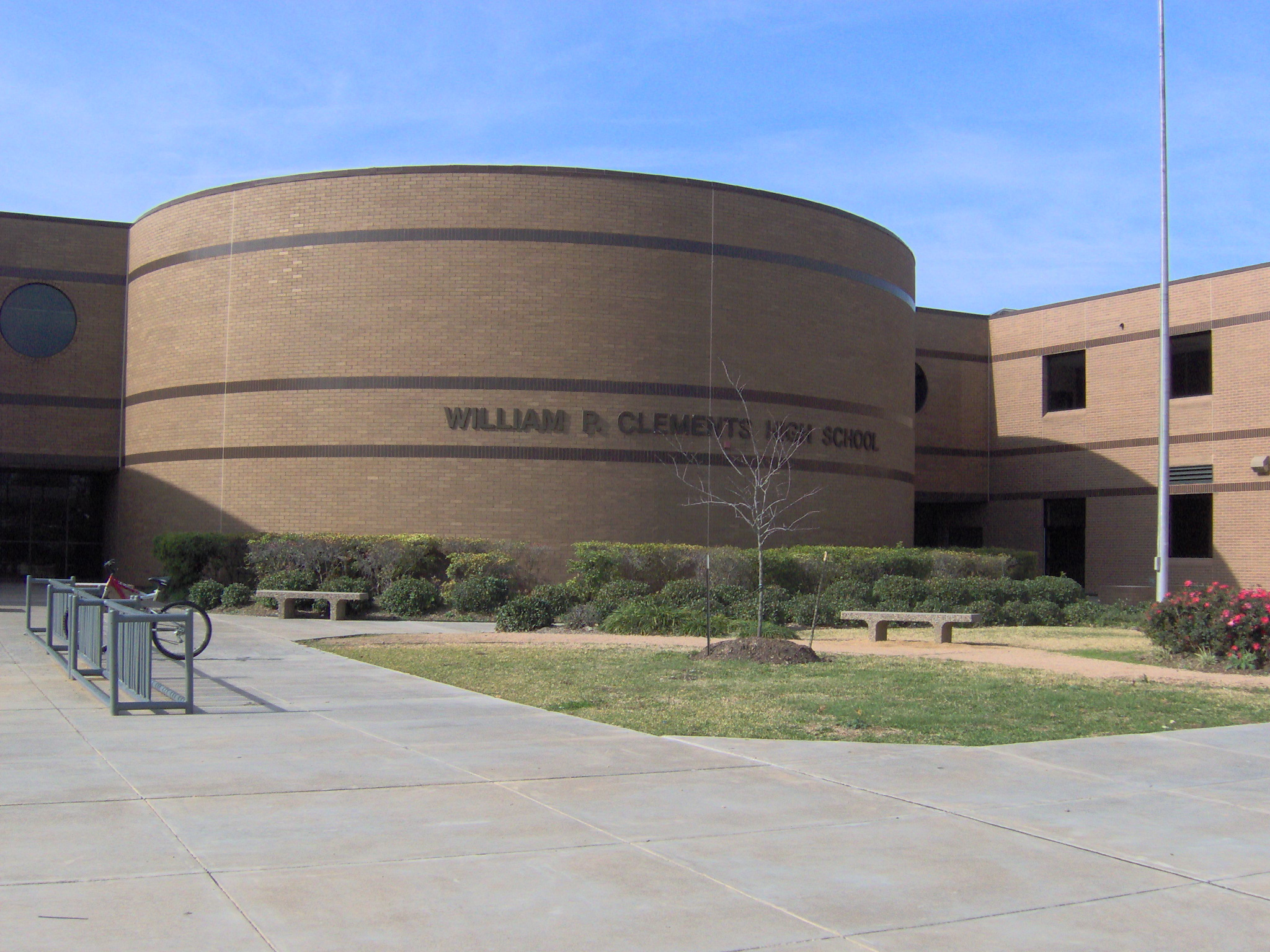
Clements High School

First Colony is within the Fort Bend Independent School District.

Elementary schools within First Colony and within Sugar Land include Austin Parkway, Colony Bend, Colony Meadows, Highlands, Lexington Creek, and Settlers Way. Other elementary schools serving sections of First Colony include Dulles Elementary School in Sugar Land, Lakeview Elementary School in Sugar Land, and Quail Valley Elementary School in Missouri City.

Most of First Colony is served by First Colony Middle School in First Colony and in Sugar Land. Other middle schools serving sections of First Colony include Dulles Middle School in Sugar Land, Fort Settlement Middle School in Sugar Land, Quail Valley Middle School in Missouri City, and Sugar Land Middle School in Sugar Land. Most of First Colony is served by Clements High School in First Colony and in Sugar Land. Other high schools serving sections of First Colony include Dulles High School in Sugar Land, in Elkins High School in Missouri City, and Kempner High School in Sugar Land.

Quail Valley Elementary, Dulles Junior High, and Dulles High had already been built as First Colony opened. Dulles Elementary was occupied in August 1976. Quail Valley Junior High School was occupied in September 1978. Colony Bend was occupied in August 1981. Clements was occupied in 1983. Dulles Junior High School reopened and was reoccupied during the same year. Settlers Way was occupied in 1984. First Colony Junior High School opened in September 1985. Highlands opened in the fall of 1986. Austin Parkway was occupied in September 1989. Colony Meadows opened in the northern hemisphere fall of 1991. Elkins opened in the northern hemisphere fall of 1992. Lexington Creek opened on August 17, 1994. Lakeview Elementary was dedicated on August 1, 1995. Quail Valley closed around 1994/1995 and reopened on August 14, 1996. First Colony Middle was a 1999–2000 National Blue Ribbon School. Elkins was a Blue Ribbon School in 2002. Fort Settlement was a 2007 Blue Ribbon School. During that year Elementary #39 began to temporarily house Quail Valley Elementary residents as the school was being rebuilt. The rebuilt Quail Valley Elementary opened in August 2008.

=== Public libraries ===
Fort Bend County Libraries operates the First Colony Branch Library in Sugar Land. The 19,400 square feet (1,800 m^{2}) library, designed by Brooks Association for Architecture and Planning and the second of four branches built with 1989 bond funds, opened in June 1993. The library includes "A Planet Clock," a piece of kinetic art by Jaroslav Belik.

=== Community colleges ===
The Texas Legislature designated Wharton County Junior College as the college for the city and extraterritorial jurisdiction of Sugar Land, while for the City of Missouri City it designates Houston Community College (HCC).

== Parks and recreation ==
Parks in First Colony operated by the association include Patriot Park. Playgrounds in First Colony operated by the association include Austin Meadows Playground, Colony Meadows 1 Playground, Colony Meadows 2 Playground, Edgwater Playground, The Enclave Playground, Heritage Colony Playground, Riverbend Playground. Pools include Alcorn Oaks Pool, Austin Park Pool, The Lakes Pool, and Woodstream Pool.

== See also ==
- Hines Interests Limited Partnership
- Somerset Green, Houston
- Las Colinas
