= Dr. Phillips, Florida =

Unincorporated area in Florida, US

- Census-designated place
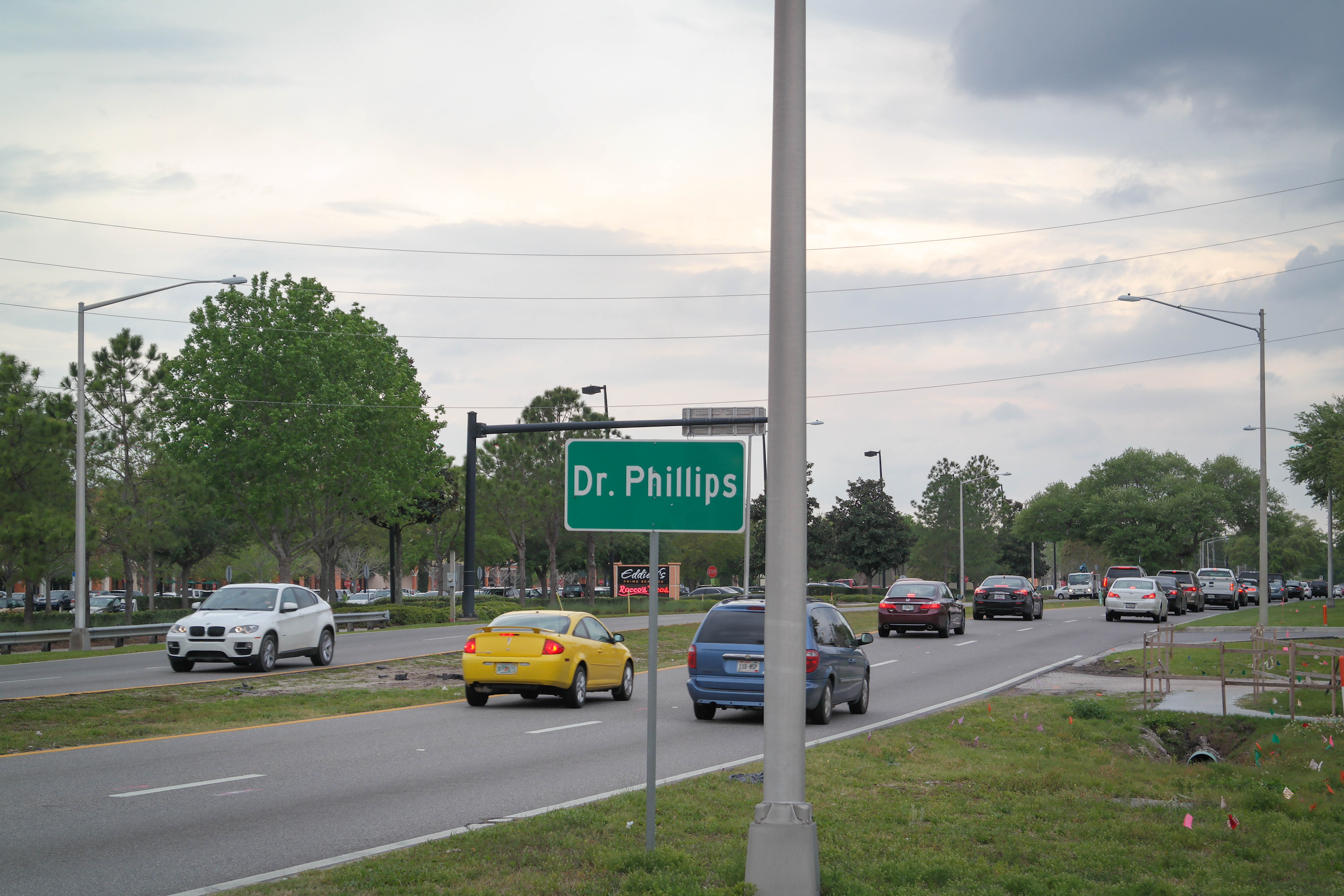
- Westbound West Sand Lake Road as it enters Dr. Phillips

- Location in Orange County and the state of Florida
- Coordinates: 28°26′30″N 81°29′42″W
- Country: United States
- State: Florida
- County: Orange
- Named for: Dr. Philip Phillips

Area
  - Total: 4.72 sq mi (12.22 km^{2})
  - Land: 3.40 sq mi (8.81 km^{2})
  - Water: 1.31 sq mi (3.40 km^{2})
- Elevation: 92 ft (28 m)

Population (2020)
  - Total: 12,328
  - Density: 3,622.2/sq mi (1,398.55/km^{2})
- Time zone: UTC-5 (Eastern (EST))
  - Summer (DST): UTC-4 (EDT)
- FIPS code: 12-17725
- GNIS feature ID: 2402411

Dr. Phillips or Doctor Phillips is a census-designated place and an unincorporated area in Orange County, Florida, United States. It is a suburb of Orlando and is part of the Orlando–Kissimmee–Sanford, Florida Metropolitan Statistical Area. The population was 12,328 at the 2020 census.

The area of Dr. Phillips is named after Philip Phillips, a Central Florida citrus magnate. He was responsible for several key innovations in the processing and packaging of orange juice. By the early 1920s, he owned thousands of acres of groves, stretching across nine Central Florida counties and extending from Conroy Road on the north to the south end of the Sand Lake Chain, encompassing all of what is now Bay Hill, Orange Tree, Sand Lake Hills, Clubhouse Estates and Turkey Lake Park.

== Geography ==
According to the United States Census Bureau, the CDP has a total area of 12.6 km^{2} (4.9 sq mi), of which 8.8 km^{2} (3.4 sq mi) is land and 3.8 km^{2} (1.5 sq mi) (29.90%) is water.

== Demographics ==
Historical population
Census	Pop.	Note	%±
1990	7,963		—
2000	9,548		19.9%
2010	10,981		15.0%
2020	12,328		12.3%

As of the census of 2000, there were 9,548 people; 3,451 households; and 2,691 families residing in the CDP. The population density was 1,084.3 people/km^{2} (2,808 people/mi^{2}). There were 3,769 housing units at an average density of 428.0 units/km^{2} (1,109 units/mi^{2}). The racial makeup of the CDP was 84.14% White; 3.05% African American; 0.06% Native American; 4.46% Asian; 0.03% Pacific Islander; 1.94% from other races; and 2.31% from two or more races. Hispanic or Latino residents of any race were 8.36% of the population.

There were 3,451 households, out of which 39.4% had children under the age of 18 living with them, 65.7% were married couples living together, 9.1% had a female householder with no husband present, and 22.0% were non-families. 17.5% of all households were made up of individuals, and 4.6% had someone living alone who was 65 years of age or older. The average household size was 2.77 and the average family size was 3.14.

In the CDP, 26.5% of the population was under the age of 18, 6.7% from 18 to 24, 28.5% from 25 to 44, 28.5% from 45 to 64, and 9.8% was 65 years of age or older. The median age was 39 years. For every 100 females, there were 95.2 males. For every 100 females age 18 and over, there were 94.7 males.

The median income for a household in the CDP was $70,754, and the median income for a family was $76,992. Males had a median income of $51,616 versus $30,696 for females. The per capita income for the CDP was $31,197. About 3.4% of families and 4.4% of the population were below the poverty line, including 3.4% of those under age 18 and 4.8% of those age 65 or over.

As of the 2010 census, the CDP had a population of 10,981; 65.9% of which was non-Hispanic White, 4.1% African American, 0.2% Native American, 9.9% Asian, and 3.7 from two or more races. Hispanic or Latino of any race were 12.9% of the population.

== Education ==
Orange County Public Schools (OCPS) serves the Dr. Phillips area.

Three elementary schools serve sections of Dr. Phillips: Dr. Phillips Elementary, Bay Meadows, and Sand Lake. Southwest Middle School is the designated middle school for the Dr. Phillips CDP. Dr. Phillips High School is the designated high school for the entire Dr. Phillips CDP.
