= Earl Cunningham =

American painter

Earl Cunningham (1893–1977) was a twentieth-century American folk artist. Cunningham was a self-taught artist who painted mostly landscapes of the coasts of Maine, New York, Nova Scotia, Michigan, North and South Carolina, Georgia and Florida. He used vivid colors, flat perspective, and a few recurrent themes. He added incongruous details, "such as flamingos in Maine and Viking ships in Florida," to his work.

Cunningham was born in Edgecomb, Maine, the third of six children. He left home at age 13 and made a living as a tinker and peddler. About four years later, he began to paint and sell pictures of boats and landscapes. He obtained a license to work as a river and coastal pilot, and worked on sailing ships along the eastern seaboard of the United States. He married Iva Moses, a piano teacher on June 29, 1915. He continued to paint and he and his wife split the next eighteen years between Florida and Maine, where they had a farm. They divorced between 1936 and 1940. In 1940 he sold the farm in Maine and bought a farm in Waterboro, South Carolina. During the Second World War, he raised chickens for the United States Army.

Cunningham moved to Saint Augustine, Florida in 1949 and opened an art gallery and curio shop. In 1961 he sent a painting titled "The Everglades" to Jacqueline Kennedy that is on display at John F. Kennedy Library and Museum in Boston. In 1969, his work began to attract serious notice, and in 1970 was exhibited at the then Loch Haven Art Center in Orlando. His reputation continued to grow, and a large number of his paintings were shown at the Museum of Arts and Sciences in Daytona Beach, Florida in August 1974.

His art continued to draw attention long after his death on December 29, 1977 (he committed suicide at age 84). He was inducted into the Florida Artist's Hall of fame on June 2, 2003. His works were on display beginning August 10, 2007 at the Smithsonian American Art Gallery in Washington, D.C., the first stop on a national tour.

== Artistic style ==
Largely considered a folk artist, Cunningham painted the American landscape of the Atlantic coast and its intercoastal ecosystem with dock workers, fishermen, farmers, wildlife and even American Indian tribes. As he traveled up and down the coast he painted his reflections of the surroundings. He depicted accurately detailed shoreline features in the tradition of memory painting. He painted over 400 landscapes, of which a large number reside at The Mennello Museum of American Art in Orlando, Fla.

His childlike style is typical of folk art, which embraces art from artists that have little or no formal training and use techniques uniquely their own. Cunningham was familiar with Grandma Moses and even gained the nickname "Grandpa Moses". His landscapes offer flattened forms shown in profile and human images resembling doll-like figures. He was not a good painter of human figures, but could draw animals well. In fact, Cunningham loved nature and just about every one of his pictures contained trees, birds or both.

It appears, at first glance, that Cunningham was a naive painter. "The painter was simple like a fox." His idyllic scenes revolve around a simpler time. If an observer did not know the dates in which the paintings were completed, placing the works in the 1800s would not be an inaccurate assumption. Although this would be incorrect, that was the reason for Cunningham's approach. These scenes are in contrast to the modern innovations of the 1950s that were happening all around him. The depictions of the world in Cunningham's paintings were the world as he wanted to see it and not an actual portrayal of his lifetime. For instance, there are never any cities to be found in his works. He only painted small towns. The paintings hold a complicated significance regarding the state of American life. It is apparent that Cunningham did not take to the advancements and modernization of the country and never showed any signs of innovation in his paintings.

Instead of simply being considered a folk artist, Cunningham can be seen as a modernist painter. His art expresses an overall sense of goodness, optimism and a utopian harmony. He achieves this feeling through strange sites, such as palm trees under snow and visions of Viking ships, along with bright colors. He expresses a specific vision by combining vivid colors in a less than scholarly fashion. Many times it appears that one is looking into the scene from a bird's eye view. A unique point of view is paired with these strange colors. There are also inaccurate proportions in many of the paintings. He wanted to create the illusion that size, or proportion, is in the eye of the beholder. The more important an object, the larger it should appear. This is how things seem in the minds of those who are innocent and naive to the ways of the world; this concept does not take away from the ability to enjoy the subject matter of the paintings. It represents a response to modern American life undergoing rapid transitions.
