= Orange juice =

Juice made from oranges

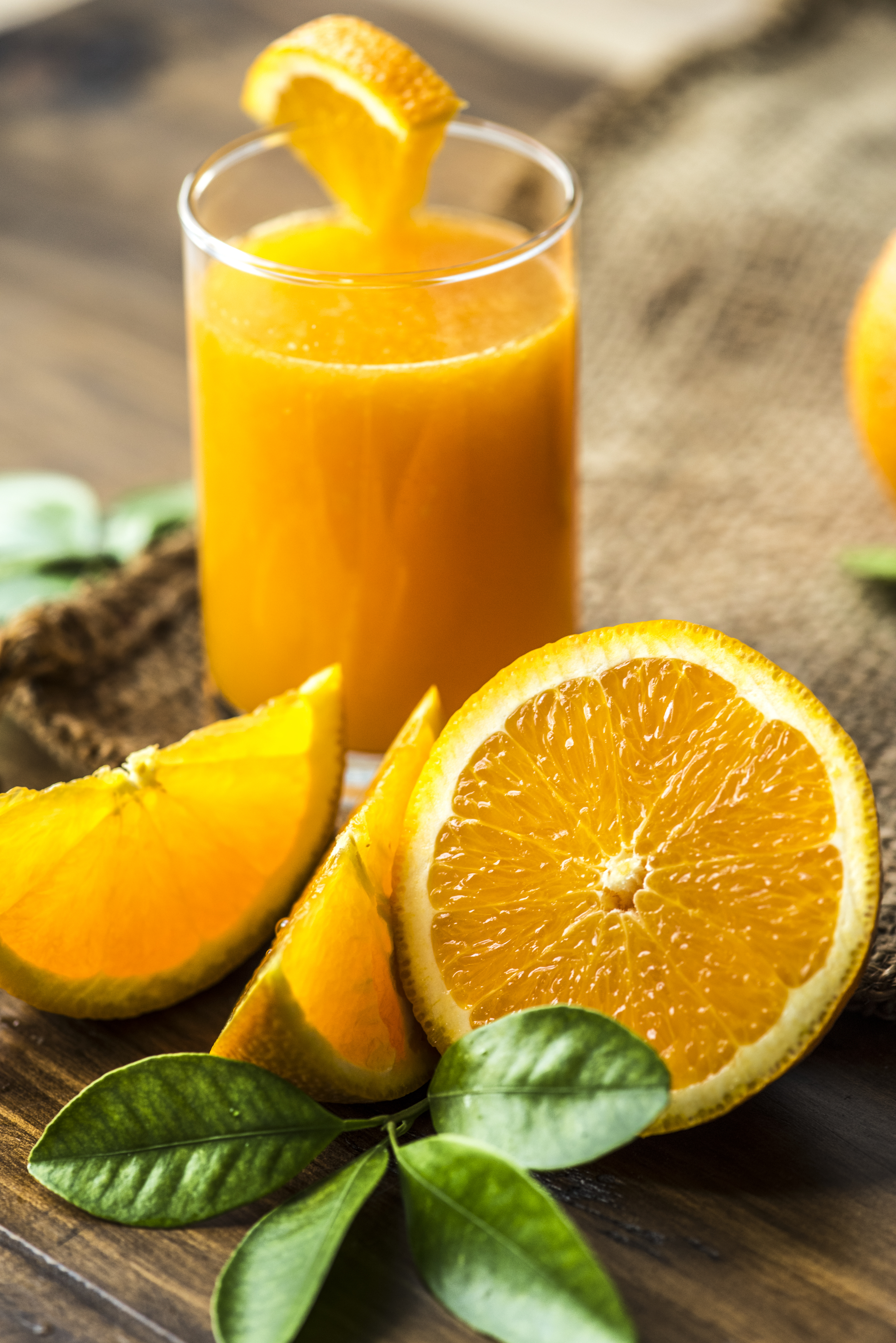

Nutritional value per 1 cup (250 mL)
- Energy: 468.6 kJ (112.0 kcal)
- Carbohydrates: 25.79
- Sugars: 20.83
- Dietary fiber: 0.50
- Fat: 0.50
- Saturated: 0.06
- Monounsaturated: 0.089
- Polyunsaturated: 0.099
- Protein: 1.74
Vitamins and minerals
Vitamins	Quantity %DV^{†}
Vitamin A equiv.	3% 25 μg
Vitamin A	496 IU
Thiamine (B1)	19% 0.223 mg
Riboflavin (B2)	6% 0.074 mg
Niacin (B3)	6% 0.992 mg
Vitamin B6	6% 0.099 mg
Folate (B9)	19% 74 μg
Vitamin B12	0% 0.00 μg
Vitamin C	138% 124.0 mg
Vitamin D	0% 0.0 IU
Vitamin E	1% 0.10 mg
Vitamin K	0% 0.2 μg
Minerals	Quantity %DV^{†}
Calcium	2% 27 mg
Iron	3% 0.50 mg
Magnesium	6% 27 mg
Phosphorus	3% 42 mg
Potassium	17% 496 mg
Sodium	0% 2 mg
Zinc	1% 0.12 mg
- Other constituents: Quantity
- Water: 218.98
- Link to USDA Database entry
- ^{†}Percentages estimated using US recommendations for adults, except for potassium, which is estimated based on expert recommendation from the National Academies.

Orange juice is a primarily liquid extract of the orange tree fruit, produced by squeezing or reaming oranges. It comes in several different varieties, including blood orange, navel oranges, valencia orange, clementine, and tangerine. As well as variations in oranges used, some varieties include differing amounts of juice vesicles, known as "pulp" in American English, and "(juicy) bits" in British English. These vesicles contain the juice of the orange and can be left in or removed during the manufacturing process. How juicy these vesicles are depend upon many factors, such as species, variety, and season. In American English, the beverage name is often abbreviated as OJ.

Commercial orange juice with a long shelf life is made by pasteurizing the juice and removing the oxygen from it. This removes much of the taste, necessitating the later addition of a flavor pack, generally made from orange products. Additionally, some juice is further processed by drying and later rehydrating the juice, or by concentrating the juice and later adding water to the concentrate.

The health value of orange juice is debatable: it has a high concentration of vitamin C, but also a very high concentration of simple sugars, comparable to soft drinks. As a result, some government nutritional advice has been adjusted to encourage substitution of orange juice with raw fruit, which is digested more slowly, and limit daily consumption.

== History ==
During World War II, American soldiers often rejected the vitamin C-packed lemon-flavored drink powder found in K-rations because of its unappetizing taste. Thus, the government searched for a better alternative that would fulfill the nutritional needs of the soldiers and prevent diseases such as scurvy while still having a desirable taste. The government and the Florida Department of Citrus worked with a group of scientists to develop a product superior to the canned orange juice available in the 1940s. The result was frozen, concentrated orange juice; this was not until three years after the war had ended.

By 1949, orange juice processing plants in Florida were producing over 10 million gallons of concentrated orange juice. Consumers liked concentrated canned orange juice as it was high in vitamin C, and they regarded it as affordable, tasty and convenient. The preparation was simple: empty the container of frozen concentrate into a measured volume of water and stir. However, by the 1980s, food scientists developed a fresher-tasting juice known as reconstituted ready-to-serve juice. Eventually in the 1990s, "not from concentrate" (NFC) orange juice was developed. Orange juice is a common breakfast beverage in the United States.

Due to the importance of oranges to the economy of Florida, "the juice obtained from mature oranges of the species Citrus sinensis and hybrids thereof" was adopted as the official beverage of Florida in 1967.

== Nutrition ==
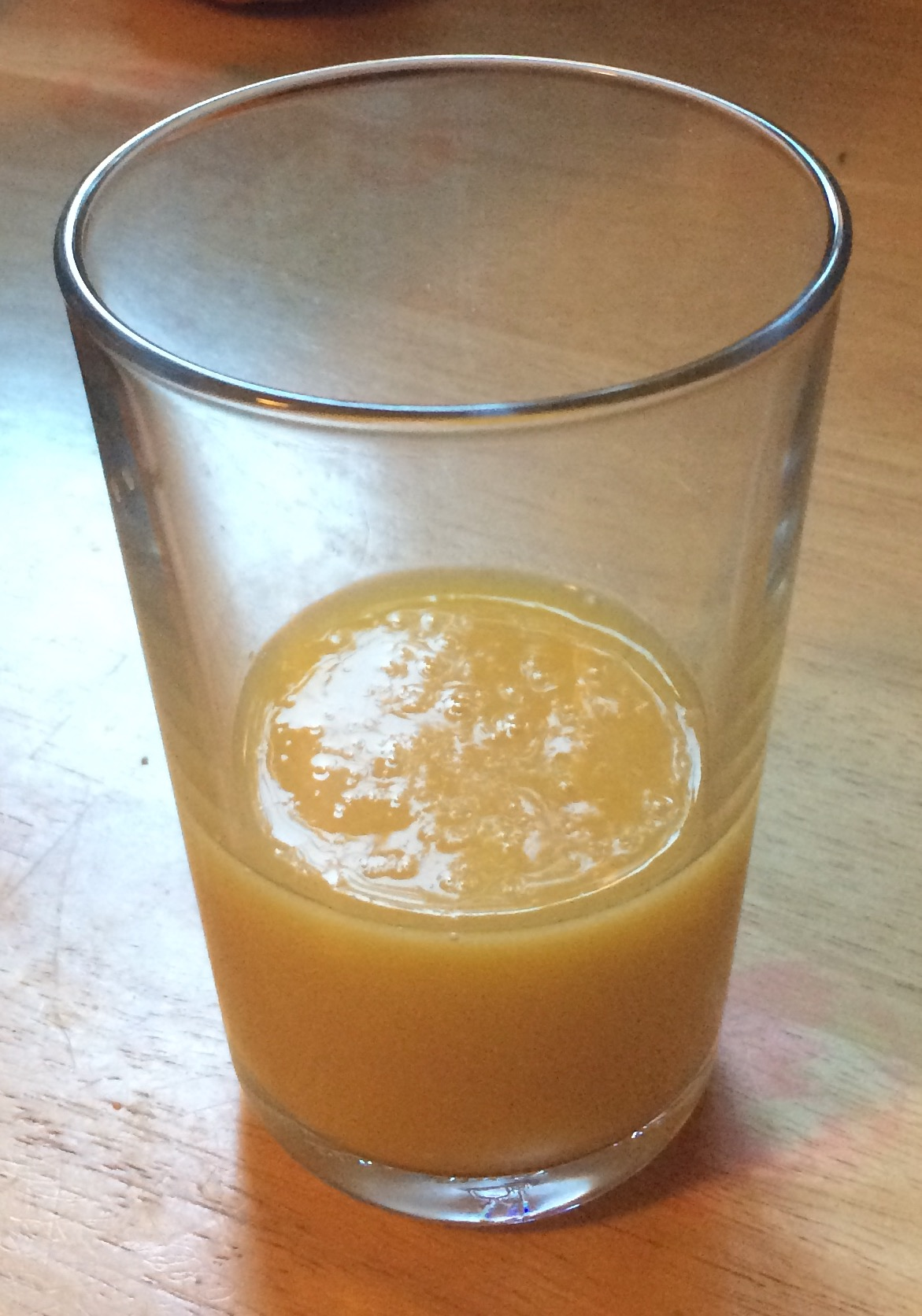
A glass of orange juice with pulp

A cup serving (250 mL or 8 fluid ounces) of fresh orange juice is 88% water and contains 26 grams of carbohydrates (including 21 grams of sugar), two grams of protein, and 0.5 grams each of dietary fiber and fat (table). One cup supplies 112 calories and 149% of the Daily Value (DV) of vitamin C, with moderate amounts (11-19% DV) of potassium, thiamin, and folate (table).

Because of its citric acid content, orange juice is acidic, with a typical pH of around 3.5.

As of 2020, consumption of orange juice was under preliminary research for the potential to improve nutrition and affect cardiovascular diseases.

== Commercial orange juice and concentrate ==
=== Frozen concentrated orange juice ===
Commercial squeezed orange juice is pasteurized and filtered before being evaporated under vacuum and heat. After removal of most of the water, this concentrate, about 65% sugar by weight, is then stored at about 10 °F (−12 °C). Essences, Vitamin C, and oils extracted during the vacuum concentration process may be added back to restore flavor and nutrition (see below).

When water is added to thawed concentrated orange juice, it is said to be reconstituted.

The product was developed in 1948 at the University of Florida's Citrus Research and Education Center. Since, it has emerged as a soft commodity, and futures contracts have traded in New York since 1966. Options on FCOJ were introduced in 1985. From the late 1950s to the mid-1980s, the product had the greatest orange juice market share, but not-from-concentrate juices surpassed FCOJ in the 1980s.

=== Not from concentrate ===
Orange juice that is pasteurized and then sold to consumers without having been concentrated is labeled as "not from concentrate". Just as "from concentrate" processing, most "not from concentrate" processing reduces the natural flavor from the juice. The largest producers of "not from concentrate" use a production process where the juice is placed in aseptic storage, with the oxygen stripped from it, for up to a year.

Removing the oxygen also strips out flavor-providing compounds, and so manufacturers add a flavor pack in the final step, which Cook's Illustrated magazine describes as containing "highly engineered additives." Flavor pack formulas vary by region, because consumers in different parts of the world have different preferences related to sweetness, freshness and acidity. According to the citrus industry, the Food and Drug Administration does not require the contents of flavor packs to be detailed on a product's packaging.

One common component of flavor packs is ethyl butyrate, a natural aroma that people associate with freshness, and which is removed from juice during pasteurization and storage. Cook's Illustrated sent juice samples to independent laboratories, and found that while fresh-squeezed juice naturally contained about 1.19 milligrams of ethyl butyrate per liter, juice that had been commercially processed had levels as high as 8.53 milligrams per liter.

=== Canned orange juice ===
A small fraction of fresh orange juice is canned. Canned orange juice retains vitamin C much better than bottled juice. The canned product loses flavor, however, when stored at room temperature for more than 12 weeks. In the early years of canned orange juice, the acidity of the juice caused the juice to have a metallic taste. In 1931, Dr. Philip Phillips developed a flash pasteurization process that eliminated this problem and significantly increased the market for canned orange juice.

=== Freshly squeezed, unpasteurized juice ===
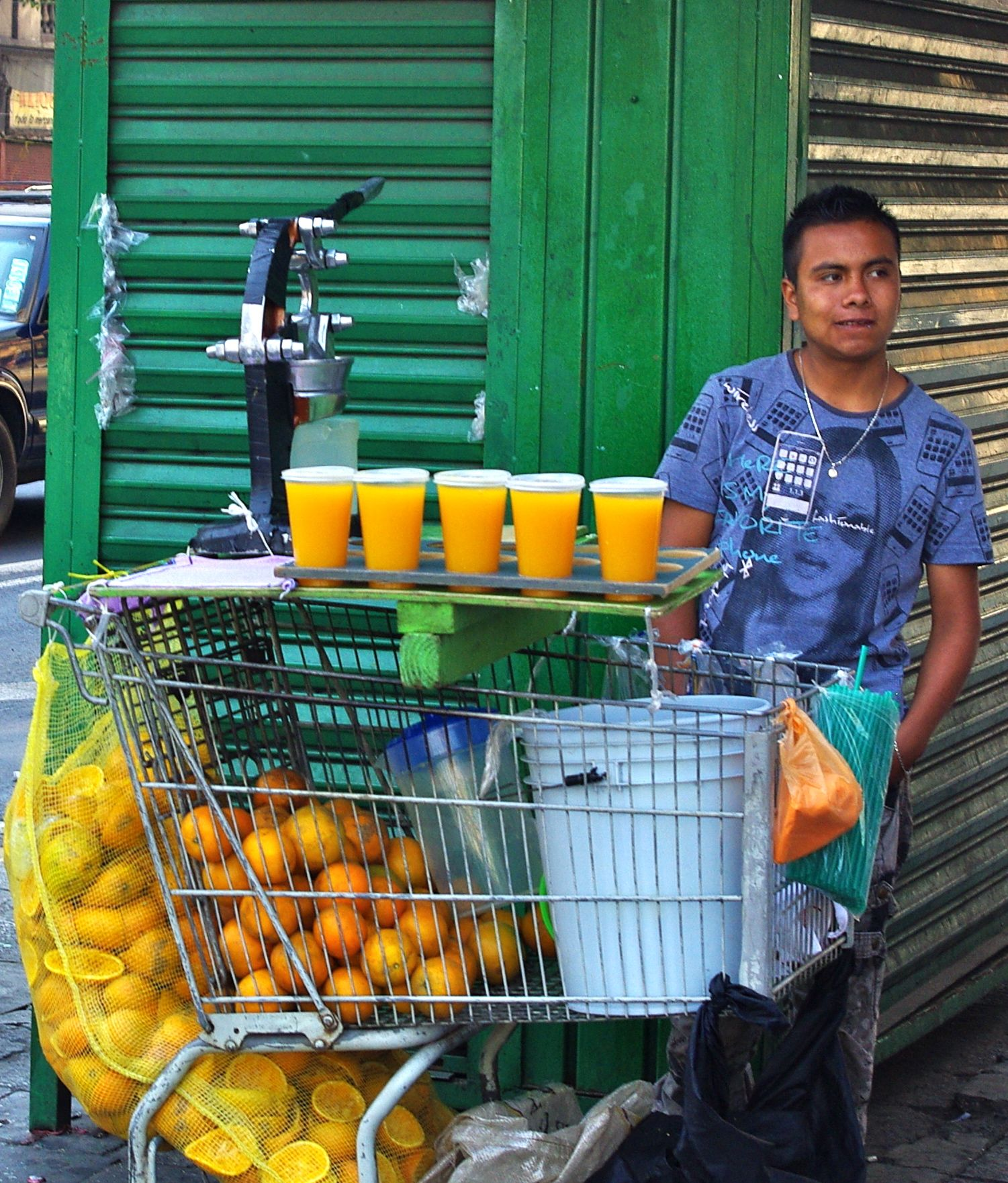
Mexico City merchant with his freshly squeezed orange juice, March 2010

Fresh-squeezed, the unpasteurized juice is the closest to consuming the orange itself. This version of the juice consists of oranges that are squeezed and then bottled without having any additives or flavor packs inserted. The juice is not subjected to pasteurization. Depending on storage temperature, freshly squeezed, unpasteurized orange juice can have a shelf life of 5 to 23 days.

=== Major orange juice brands ===
In the U.S., the major orange juice brand is Tropicana Products (owned by PAI Partners and PepsiCo Inc.), which possesses nearly 65% of the market share. Tropicana also has a large presence in Latin America, Europe, and Central Asia. Competing products include Minute Maid (of The Coca-Cola Company) and Florida's Natural Growers (a Floridian agricultural cooperative that differentiates itself from the competition by being locally owned and using only Florida grown oranges; Tropicana and Simply Orange use a mixture of domestic and foreign stock).

In Australia, Daily Juice (owned by National Foods) is a major brand of partially fresh, partially preserved, orange juice.

In the United Kingdom, major orange juice brands include Del Monte and Princes.

=== Additives ===
Some producers add citric acid or ascorbic acid to juice beyond what is naturally found in the orange. Some also include other nutrients. Often, additional vitamin C is added to replace that destroyed in pasteurization. Additional calcium may be added. Vitamin D, not found naturally in oranges, may be added as well. Sometimes omega-3 fatty acids from fish oils are added to orange juice. Low-acid varieties of orange juice also are available.

FCOJ producers generally use evaporators to remove much of the water from the juice in order to decrease its weight and decrease transportation costs. Other juice producers generally deaerate the juice so that it can be sold much later in the year.

Because such processes remove the distinct aroma compounds that give orange juice a fresh-squeezed taste, producers later add back these compounds in a proprietary mixture, called a "flavor pack", in order to improve the taste and to ensure a consistent year-round taste. The compounds in the flavor packs are derived from orange peels by squeezing the oil out of them. Producers do not mention the addition of flavor packs on the label of the orange juice.

=== Types of orange ===
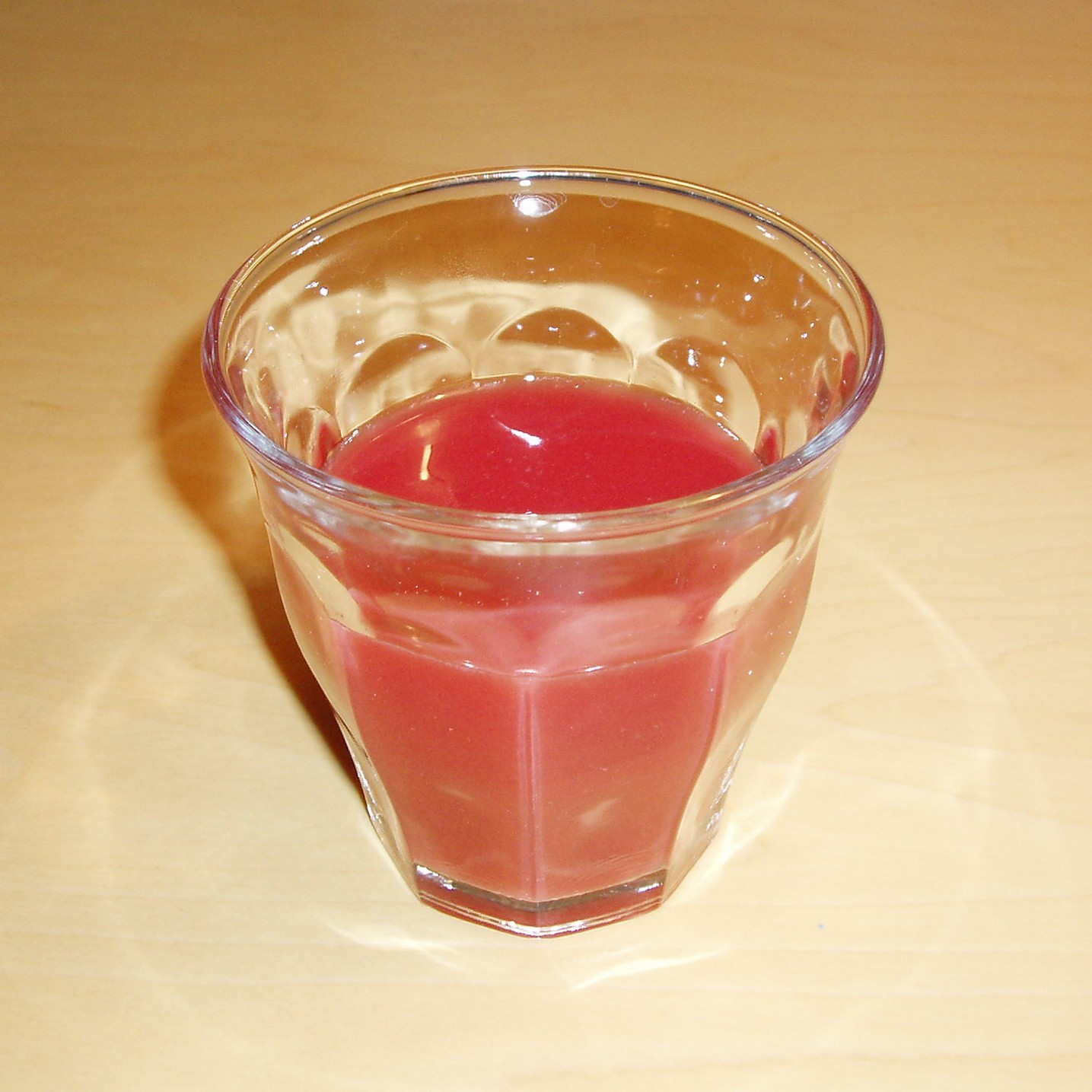
A glass of blood orange juice

Common orange juice is made from the sweet orange. Different cultivars (for example, Valencia, Hamlin) have different properties, and a producer may mix cultivar juices to get the desired taste. Orange juice usually varies between shades of orange and yellow, although some ruby red or blood orange varieties are a reddish-orange or even pinkish. This is due to different pigmentation in ruby red oranges.

The blood orange is a mutant of the sweet orange. The mandarin orange and the clementine and tangerine varieties are often used for sparkling juice drinks.

Many brands of organic orange juices have become available on the market.

== Processing and manufacture ==
=== Manufacture of frozen concentrated orange juice ===
Film clip showing the production and packaging of frozen orange juice concentrate.

The processing of orange to frozen concentrated orange juice begins with testing the orange fruit for quality to ensure it is safe for the process. Then the fruit is cleaned and washed thoroughly and orange oil is taken from the peel of the orange. Next, the juice is extracted from the orange and is screened in order to remove seeds and large pieces of pulp. The juice is then heated to 190 to 200 °F in order to inactivate natural enzymes found in the juice. The concentration step occurs in a high vacuum evaporator where the water content in the juice is evaporated while the juice sugar compounds and solids are concentrated. The vacuum evaporator is a low temperature falling film evaporator, which operates at a temperature between 60 and 80 °F. Evaporators work in a continuous manner in that fresh juice is added as concentrate is being constantly removed. The concentration process increases the soluble solid portion of the juice from 12 °Brix to 60-70 °Brix.

The concentrated juice is held in a cold wall tank and is stored at or below 35 °F to prevent browning and development of undesired flavors. Next, a small amount of fresh juice is added to the concentrated juice to restore natural and fresh flavors of orange juice that have been lost through the concentration process. Specific cold-pressed orange oils are used to restore the lost aroma and volatile flavors. After the addition of fresh juice, the brix content is reduced to 42 °F. The fresh juice is referred to as "cut-back" in the industry and attributes to 7-10% of the total juice. Orange peel oil is also added if the oil content is below the required level. The concentrate is then further cooled in a continuous cooler or cold wall tank to 20 to 25 °F. The concentrate is canned using steam injection methods to sterilize the lid and develop a vacuum in the can. The cans then undergo final freezing where they are conveyed on a perforated belt in an air blast at -40 °F. After freezing, the product is stored at 0 °F in a refrigerated warehouse.

=== Manufacture of "not from concentrate" ===
Single strength orange juice (SSOJ) can either be "not from concentrate" (NFC) orange juice or juice that is reconstituted from a concentrate with the addition of water to reach a specific single strength brix level. The processing of SSOJ also begins with the selection of orange. The most common types of orange used to produce orange juice are the Pineapple orange, Valencia orange, and Washington Navel oranges from Florida and California. The manufacturing journey begins when oranges are delivered to processing plants by trucks holding about 35,000 to 40,000 pounds of fruit. The fruit is unloaded at the plant for inspection and grading to remove unsuitable fruit before the oranges enter the storage bins. An automatic sampler removes oranges for determination of acid and soluble solids. The bins are organized based on ratio of soluble solids to acids in order to blend oranges appropriate to produce juice with uniform flavor. After the fruit leaves the bins, they are scrubbed with detergent on a rotary brush washer and subsequently rinsed with potable water. Throughout the processing stages, there are multiple points with facilities that inspect oranges and discard damaged fruit.

The oranges then go through roller conveyors, which expose all sides of the fruit. The roller conveyors are efficiently built as they are well lighted, installed at a convenient height, and width to ensure all inspectors can reach the fruit to determine inadequacies. Some reasons why fruit may be rejected include indication of mold, rot, and ruptured peels. Afterwards, the oranges are separated based on size through machines prior to juice extraction. There are a number of different ways orange juice industry leaders extract their oranges. Some common methods include halving the fruit and pressing/reaming the orange to extract juice from the orange. One instrument inserts a tube through the orange peel and forces the juice out through the tube by squeezing the entire orange. Despite the variety of machines used to extract juices, all machines have commonalities in that they are rugged, fast, easy to clean and have the ability to reduce peel extractives into the juice. The extracted juice product does not contain the orange peel, but it may contain pulp and seeds, which are removed by finishers.

Finishers have a screw-type design that comprises a conical helical screw enclosed in a cylindrical screen with perforations the size of 0.020 to 0.045 inches. Thereafter, the finished orange juice flows through blending tanks where the juice is tested for acid and soluble solids. At this stage, sugar can be added to the juice depending on if the product will be a sweetened or unsweetened beverage. Following blending, the orange juice is deaerated where the air is incorporated into the juice during extraction. The benefits of deaeration include the elimination of foaming, which improves the uniformity of can fill and improvement regarding the efficiency of the heat exchanger. Orange peel oil is essential for maximum flavor, but according to U.S. standards for Grades of Canned Orange Juice, 0.03% of recoverable oil is permitted. Deoiling through the use of vacuum distillation is the mechanism used to regulate the amount of peel oil in the juice. Condensation separates the oil and the aqueous distillate, which is returned to the juice.

The next step is one of the most vital in the processing of orange juice. Pasteurization is important in destroying naturally occurring enzymes that are associated with deterioration of the juice. Pectinesterase is infamous for its deteriorative activity in orange juice. In the pasteurization process, the juice is generally rapidly heated to 197 °F for about 40 seconds. Several industry leaders use flash pasteurization, which is carried out by tubular or plate-type heat exchangers. In order to prevent overheating, turbulent flow is vital to heat the juice rapidly. Cans are filled with the pasteurized juice and inverted immediately to allow the juice to sterilize the inside parts of the lid. The orange juice filled can is sealed and cooled to 90 to 100 °F by spinning on the conveyor belt under cool water sprays. Quality of storage is determined by time and temperature. Juice must be stored at cool temperatures to prevent deterioration.

== Standards and regulations ==
=== Regulations in the United States ===
In the United States, orange juice is regulated and standardized by the Food and Drug Administration (FDA or USFDA) of the United States Department of Health and Human Services. According to the FDA, orange juice from concentrate is a mixture of water with frozen concentrated orange juice or concentrated orange juice for manufacturing. Additional ingredients into the mixture may include fresh/frozen/pasteurized orange juice from mature oranges, orange oil, and orange pulp. Furthermore, one or more of the following optional sweetening ingredients may be added: sugar, sugar syrup, invert sugar, invert sugar syrup, dextrose, corn syrup, dried corn syrup, glucose syrup, and dried glucose syrup. The orange juice must contain a minimum Brix level of 11.8, which indicates the percentage of orange juice soluble solids, excluding any added sweetening ingredients.

=== Regulations in the United Kingdom ===
In the United Kingdom, orange juice from concentrate is a product of concentrated fruit juice with the addition of water. Any lost flavour or pulp of the orange juice during the initial concentration process may be restored in the final product to be equivalent to an average type of orange juice of the same kind. Any restored flavour or pulp must come from the same species of orange. Sugar may be added to the orange juice for regulating the acidic taste or sweetening, but must not exceed 150g per litre of orange juice. Across the UK, the final orange juice from concentrate product must contain a minimum Brix level of 11.2, excluding the additional sweetening ingredients. Vitamins and minerals may be added to the orange juice in accordance with Regulation (EC) 1925/2006.

== Physical and chemical properties ==
=== Molecular composition ===
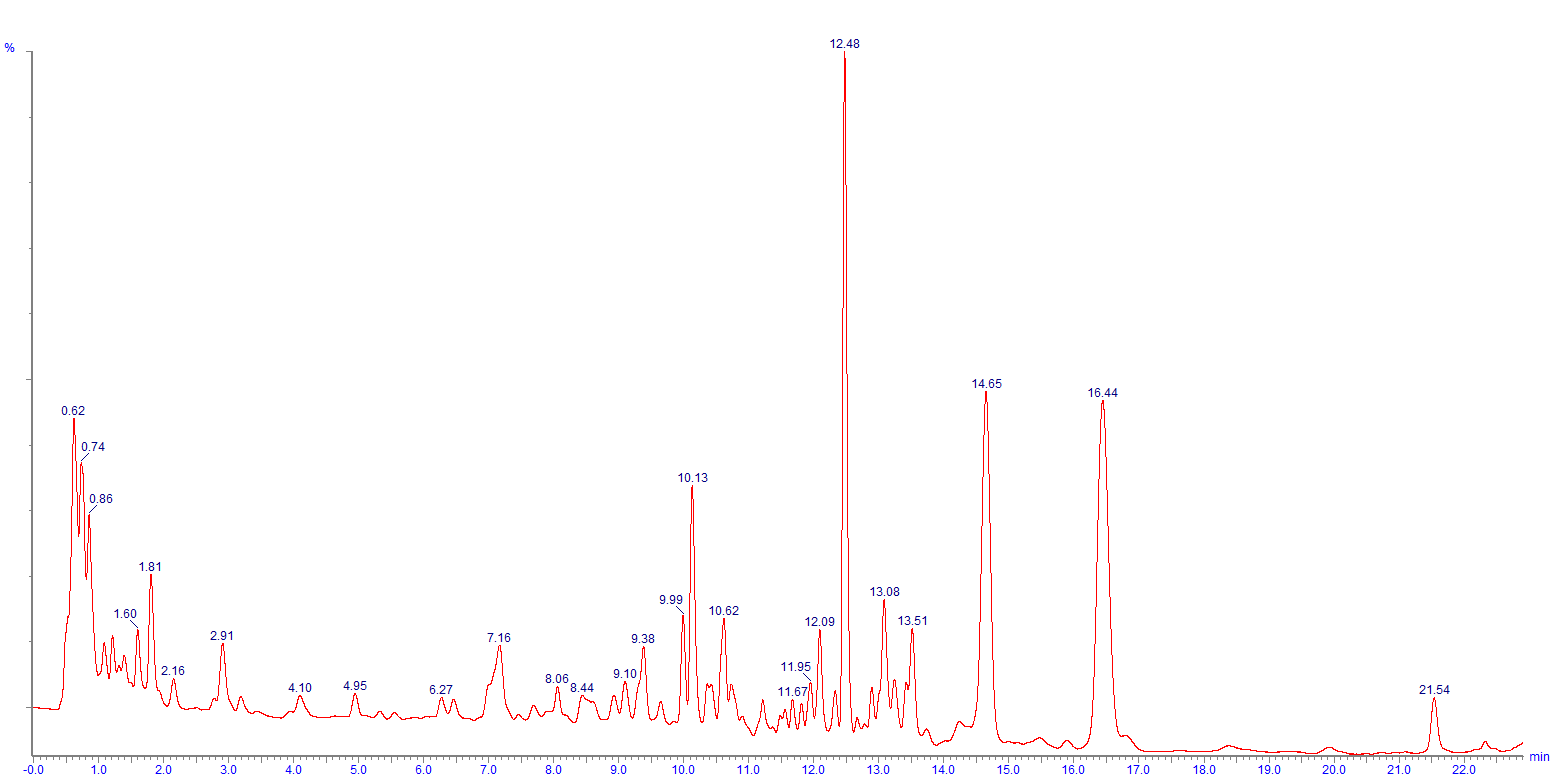
UV 280 nm chromatogram after UHPLC separation of commercial orange juice, showing, amongst other peaks, narirutin and hesperidin.

On a molecular level, orange juice is composed of organic acids, sugars, and phenolic compounds. The main organic acids found in orange juice are citric, malic, and ascorbic acid. The major sugars found in orange juice are sucrose, glucose, and fructose. There are approximately 13 phenolic compounds in orange juice including hydroxycinnamic acids, flavanones, hydroxybenzoic acids, hesperidin, narirutin, and ferulic acid.

==== Composition of the cloud ====
The cloud is the portion of suspended particles that range in size from 0.05 micrometers to a few hundred micrometers in orange juice. The cloud is responsible for several sensory attributes in orange juice including color, aroma, texture, and taste. The continuous medium of the cloud consists of a solution of sugars, pectin, and organic acids while the dispersed matter is formed through cellular tissue comminuted in fruit processing. Specifically, the cloudiness of the juice is caused by pectin, protein, lipid, hemicellulose, cellulose, hesperidin, chromoplastids, amorphous particles, and oil globules. In particular the chemical composition of the cloud consists of 4.5-32% pectin, 34-52% protein, 25% lipids, 5.7% nitrogen, 2% hemicellulose, 2% ash, and less than 2% cellulose.

=== Physical structure ===
Orange juice is a suspension that consists of heterogeneous particles in a clear serum. A serum is the clear supernatant after the precipitation of the cloud through centrifugation. The previously mentioned cloud makes up a large part of the suspension.

If the suspension in orange juice is not stable, the cloud particles can flocculate which causes the suspension to physically decompose. The cloud can break apart and the citrus juice will clarify if the suspension becomes unstable. The activity of pectin methyl esterase increased the interaction between pectin and cloud proteins, which led to protein-pectin flocculation. The insoluble material of the cloud clumps in conditions above 70 °C (158 °F) and at a pH of 3–4 at which proteins coagulate and flocculate. Cloud flocculation is enhanced at pH 3.5 and can result in clarification, which is undesirable in orange juice.

The suspension is unstable when the zeta potential is less than 25 mv in magnitude. Zeta potential is a measure of the magnitude of electrostatic forces between particles, which affect repulsion, and attraction between particles. A low zeta value signifies that the repulsive forces will not be able to overcome Van der Waals attractions between cloud particles and thus begin to agglomerate. Agglomeration of cloud particles will prevent free flow characteristics, which is essential in the juice. A high zeta potential will inhibit particle-particle agglomeration and maintain the free flowing nature as well as uniform dispersion in orange juice.

The oil globules adsorbed to the cloud particles stabilize the suspension by decreasing the average density of particles to bring it closer to that of the serum. However, large amounts of oil can be problematic as they cause complete breakdown of suspensions by causing cloud particles to float to the surface. The particles in the cloud have a negative charge that decreases with decreasing pH. In accordance with cloud stability, the hydration of particles is more significant than their electrical charge.

==== Heat treatment ====
When orange juice is heat treated there is an increase in the number of fine particles and decrease in that of coarse particles. The fine particles in particular are responsible for the appearance, color, and flavor of orange juice. Heat treatment plays a vital role on pulp volume, cloud stability, serum turbidity, and serum viscosity. Heat treatment stabilizes the cloud through enzyme inactivation and enhances the turbidity of a stable cloud formation. The increase in serum viscosity is due to the extraction of pectic substances into the serum. Based on Stokes' law, the increase in serum viscosity is the cause for the enhanced cloud stability. In relation to pulp volume, the pulp from heated juices was finer and more compact than unheated juice pulp, which was voluminous and fluffy.

==== Properties of pulp ====
In orange juice, pulp is responsible for desirable flow properties, taste, flavor, and mouth feel. However, pulpy orange juice precipitates based on a rate dependent on the diameter, density, and viscosity of the suspended particles as well as the suspending juice. In order to remain suspended in orange juice, pulp particles must have appropriate particle size, charge, and specific gravity. Depending on type of processing method, the size of pulp particles ranges from 2–5 millimeters (0.08–0.2 in). Those that are smaller than 2 mm (0.08 in) are known to be more stable, so it is beneficial to reduce the size of particles by incorporating hydrocolloids to the juice product. Hydrocolloids would decrease the rate of sediment formation and decrease the falling rate of pulp particles.

==== Hydrocolloids ====
Hydrocolloids are long-chain polymers that form viscous dispersions and gels if dispersed in water. They have a number of functional properties in food products including emulsifying, thickening, coating, gelling, and stabilization. The main reason hydrocolloids are used in foods is their capability to modify the rheology of food systems. Hydrocolloids impact viscosity through flow behavior and mechanical solid properties like texture. Some common hydrocolloids that are used to stabilize juice products include gellan gum, sodium carboxymethylcellulose, xanthan, guar gum, and gum Arabic. The aforementioned hydrocolloids are generally used in the production of imitation orange juices and are often referred to as synthetic hydrocolloids. Pectin is the hydrocolloid found in natural orange juices.

==== Properties of pectin ====
Pectin is the soluble polymeric material in the pulp of oranges, which contains 75% of carboxyl of arabinose and galactose. Pectic compounds are complex heteropolysaccharides in that their chemical composition includes a chain structure of axial-axial α-1.4-linked d-galacturonic acid unit along with blocks of L-rhamnose regions that have side chains of arabinose, galactose, and xylose. Pectin methyl-esterase is the enzyme responsible for hydrolyzing carboxymethyl esters and liberating free carboxyl groups and methyl alcohols. The free carboxyl groups interact with cations to form insoluble pectic acid divalent metal ion complexes. These metal ion complexes precipitate in the juice and carry all the colloids in orange juice with it. The enzyme would flocculate the cloud and clarify the orange juice. Thus, in order to keep the orange juice cloud intact, it is vital to inactivate pectinesterase. Pectinesterase is inactivated by heating the juice for 1 minute at 90 °C (194 °F).

==== Interactions of pectin ====
The solution behavior of pectin is strongly influenced by a number of factors including hydrogen bonding, ionic character, and hydrophobic character. Hydrogen bonding is favored when pH is less than pKa while the ionic character is favored when pH is greater than pKa. Ionic character relies on free carboxyl content, the presence of cations, and is favored at a high water activity. Charge-charge repulsions along with the presence of neutral side chains are essential in inhibiting intermolecular association among pectin molecules. The methyl ester content in orange juice determines hydrophobic character, which is favored at low water activity.

There is a specific interaction between pectin and hesperidin through the sugar moieties in the hesperidin molecule. Through acid hydrolysis, the rhamnose and glucose sugar moieties are removed from hesperidin, which breaks the interaction between hesperidin and pectin. Hydrogen bonding plays a role in the specific interaction of neutral sugars of pectin and the sugar moiety of hesperidin. A polymer that has a high structural content of neutral sugar branches interacts with hesperidin more tightly and strongly than that of a low content of neutral sugar branches. The interaction between pectin and hesperidin is one of the factors that enable the colloidal suspension in orange juice to be stable.

== Consumption ==
According to industry data, U.S. orange juice consumption has been steadily decreasing. In the 2008-2009 crop year, Americans consumed approximately 865,000 metric tons of orange juice. By the 2022-2023 crop year, this figure had fallen to around 500,000 metric tons, representing an average annual decline of approximately 4%. Factors contributing to this decline include rising prices for orange juice and adverse weather conditions affecting orange harvests.

== See also ==
- Juicing
- List of juices
- Grapefruit juice
