= Sugar Land Town Square =

Shopping center in Sugar Land, Texas

Coordinates: 29.595987°N 95.622137°W

- Public Square
- Nickname: SLTS
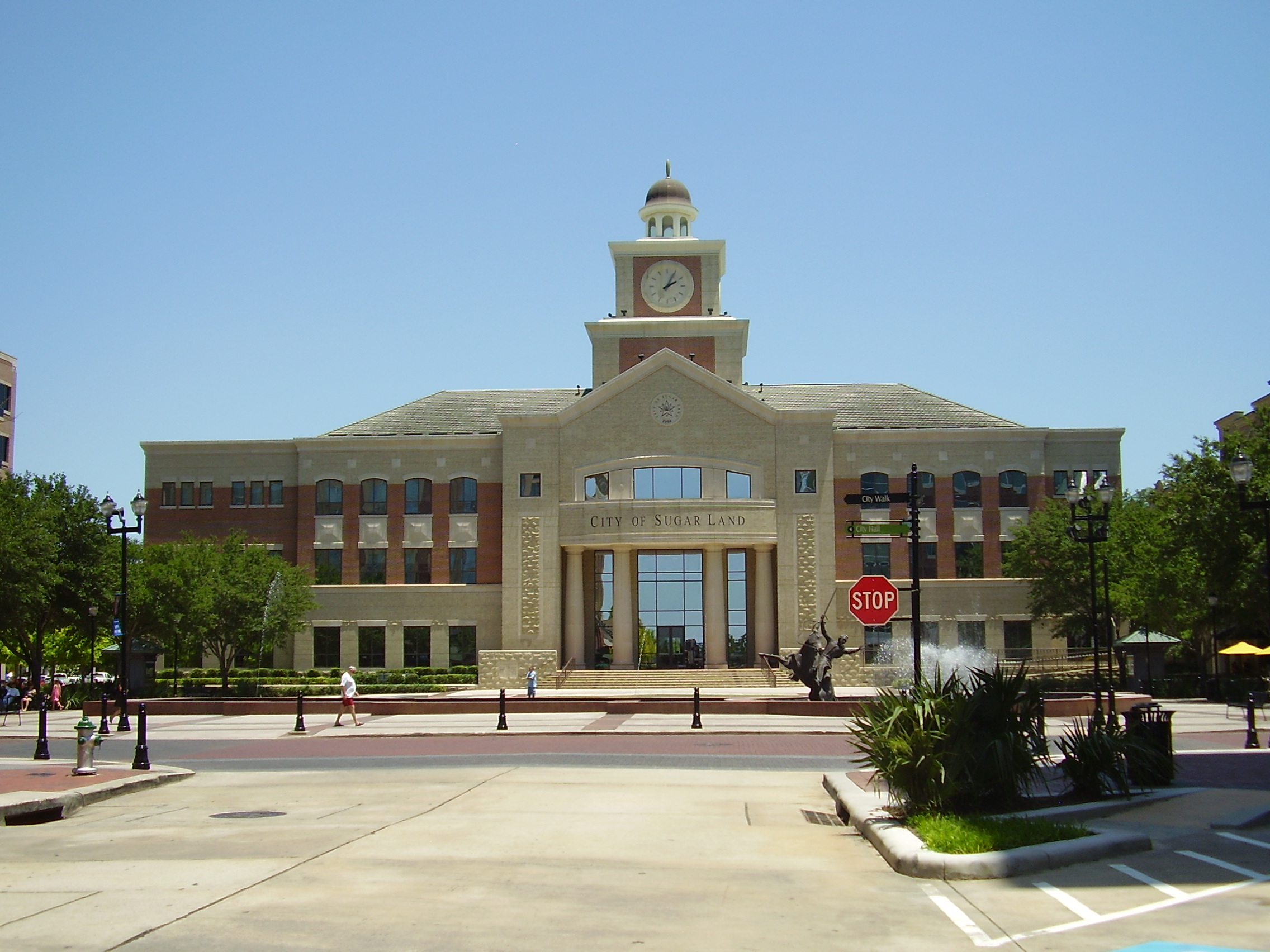
- Sugar Land City Hall
- Features: Marriott Hotel, Coca-Cola office, Minute Maid Headquarters, various condominiums, and reastraunts, 1.4 pedestrian plaza, Sugar Land Town Hall.
- Opened: October 1, 2003
- Location: Sugar Land, Texas, United States
- Interactive map of Sugar Land Town Square

Sugar Land Town Square is a 1,400,000 square feet (130,000 m^{2}), 32 acres (13 ha) office and shopping complex in Sugar Land, Texas, United States. The complex, developed by Planned Community Developers Ltd. (PCD), owned by Sugarland Properties Inc., and located at the intersection of Interstate 69/U.S. Highway 59 and Texas State Highway 6, includes Sugar Land's City Hall and the corporate headquarters of Minute Maid, CVR Energy and the North American operations of the Cosentino Group. The development, a part of the First Colony development, has office space, condominiums, retail stores, restaurants, and a hotel. Sugar Land Town Square is located 19 miles (31 km) from Downtown Houston.

== History ==
Sugar Land Town Square as of 2007

Sugar Land Town Square was first envisioned in 1996 as a new central business district for the City of Sugar Land. Planned Community Developers Ltd. In 2000 Sugarland Properties began to search for the first tenant of the complex; the developers had $31 million in financing on hand. The developers intended to create an urban atmosphere in the project. The first phase consisted of a six-story, 150,000 square feet (14,000 m^{2}) office building and 60,000 square feet (5,600 m^{2})-80,000 square feet (7,400 m^{2}) of retail space. The development, patterned after Reston Town Center in Reston, Virginia, opened on one of the final parcels of land remaining to be developed in the First Colony project, also created by Sugarland Properties. The soft opening of the Marriott hotel was celebrated on October 1, 2003.

As part of its 2005 Landmark Awards, the Houston Business Journal (HBJ) ranked Sugar Land Town Square as having the "Best Community Impact." Christine Hall of the HBJ said that the complex "gives the Fort Bend suburb an "urban" feel."

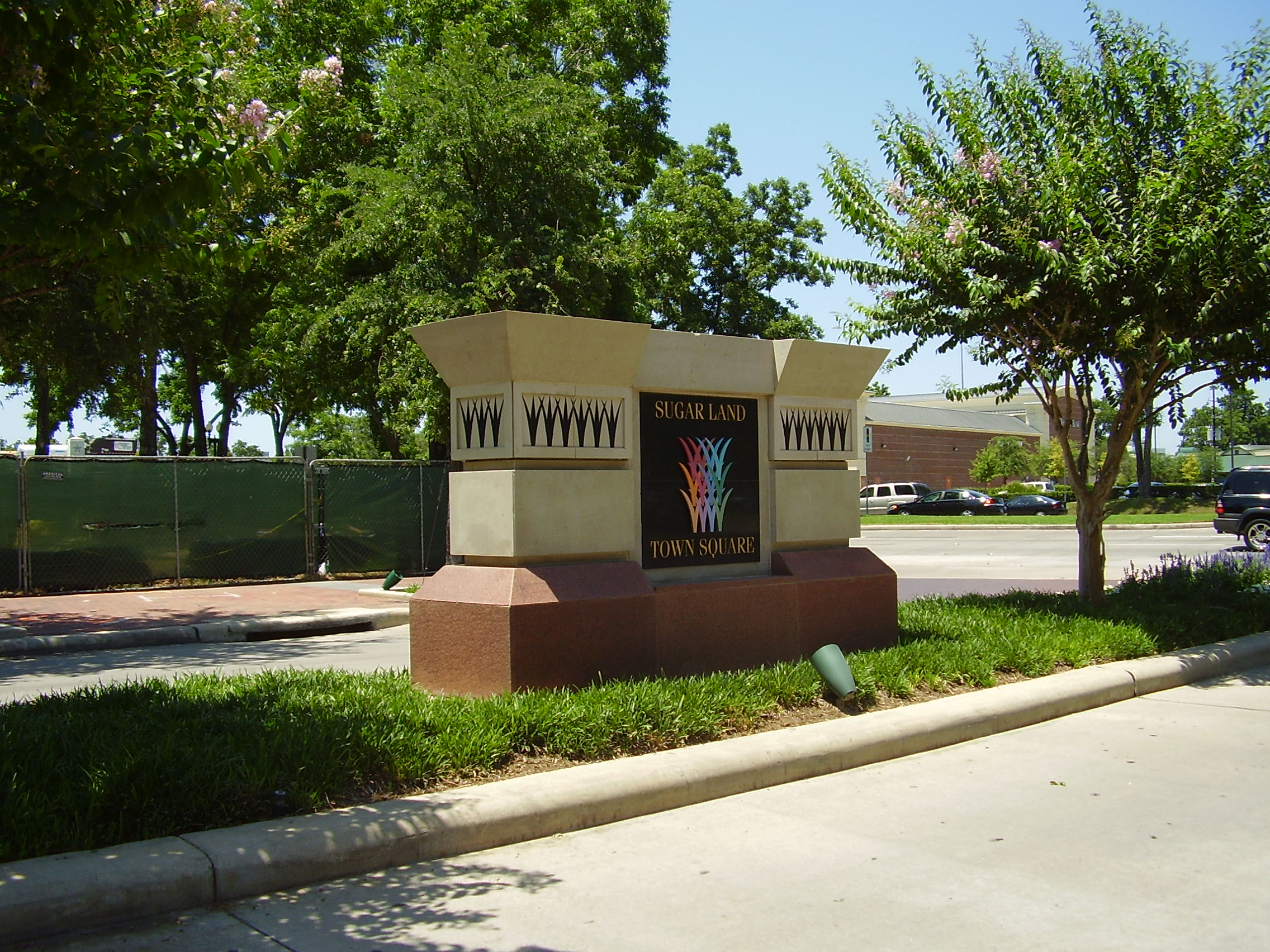
Sugar Land Town Square sign

As part of the second phase of development for the center, Planned Community Developers announced in 2005 that it would build a six-story office and retail building that would be the first Class A office building in Sugar Land. Planned Community Developers planned to build two smaller office and retail buildings near the large office building. Planned Community Developers Ltd. began constructing the office building in July 2006. The Coca-Cola Company began negotiating for 120,000 square feet (11,000 m^{2}) of space in the building. The City of Sugar Land approved a $2.4 million incentive to get Minute Maid to move its headquarters from the 2000 St. James Place building in Houston to Sugar Land Town Center. Minute Maid was required to place the logo on the headquarters building and refer to its headquarters as being in Sugar Land. Minute Maid opened its headquarters on February 16, 2009.

On October 30, 2007, Planned Community Developers broke ground on the final two buildings, together with 200,000 square feet (19,000 m^{2}) of space, to be developed in the center. At the same time the company planned to sell the entire complex once the two last buildings were finished. The buildings not put up for sale, the Sugar Land City Hall, the hotels, and the condominiums, were owned by other entities.

== Composition ==
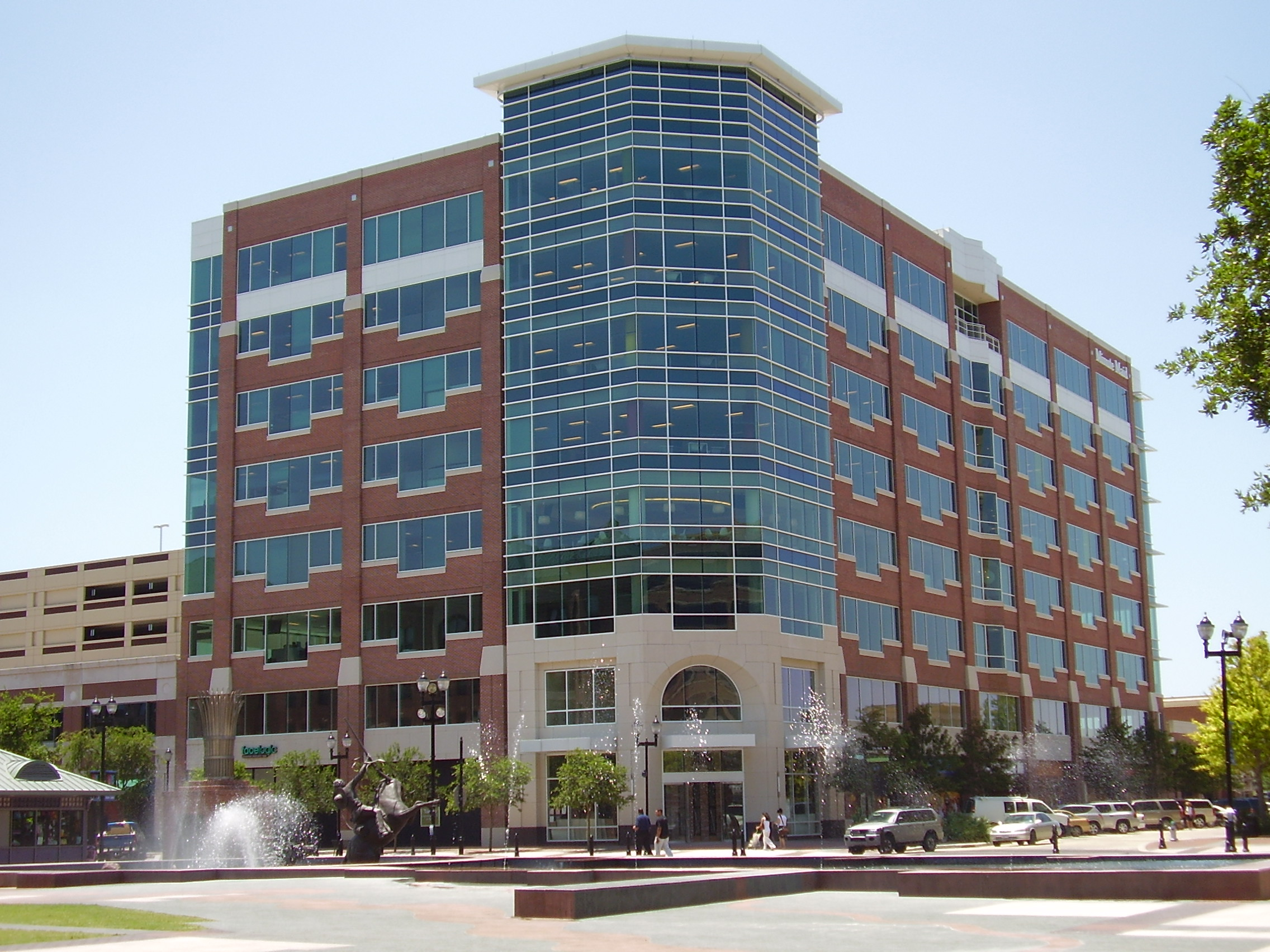
The headquarters of Minute Maid

The complex has 200,000 square feet (19,000 m^{2}) of retail space, 750,000 square feet (70,000 m^{2}) of Class A office space, the Sugar Land City Hall, the Sugar Land Marriott and Conference Center, condominiums, and restaurants.

The six story office building in Sugar Land Town Square has 140,000 square feet (13,000 m^{2}) of Class A office space and 10,000 square feet (930 m^{2}) of retail space on the ground floor. The building, with Lee Mitchell of Ambrose, McEnany and House Architects as the lead architect has a steel frame and a brick veneer. The exteriors have precast concrete, glass, granite, and metal panels and glass. Two smaller office and retail buildings, a two-story 60,400 square feet (5,610 m^{2}) building and a one-story 47,000 square feet (4,400 m^{2}) are near the large office building.

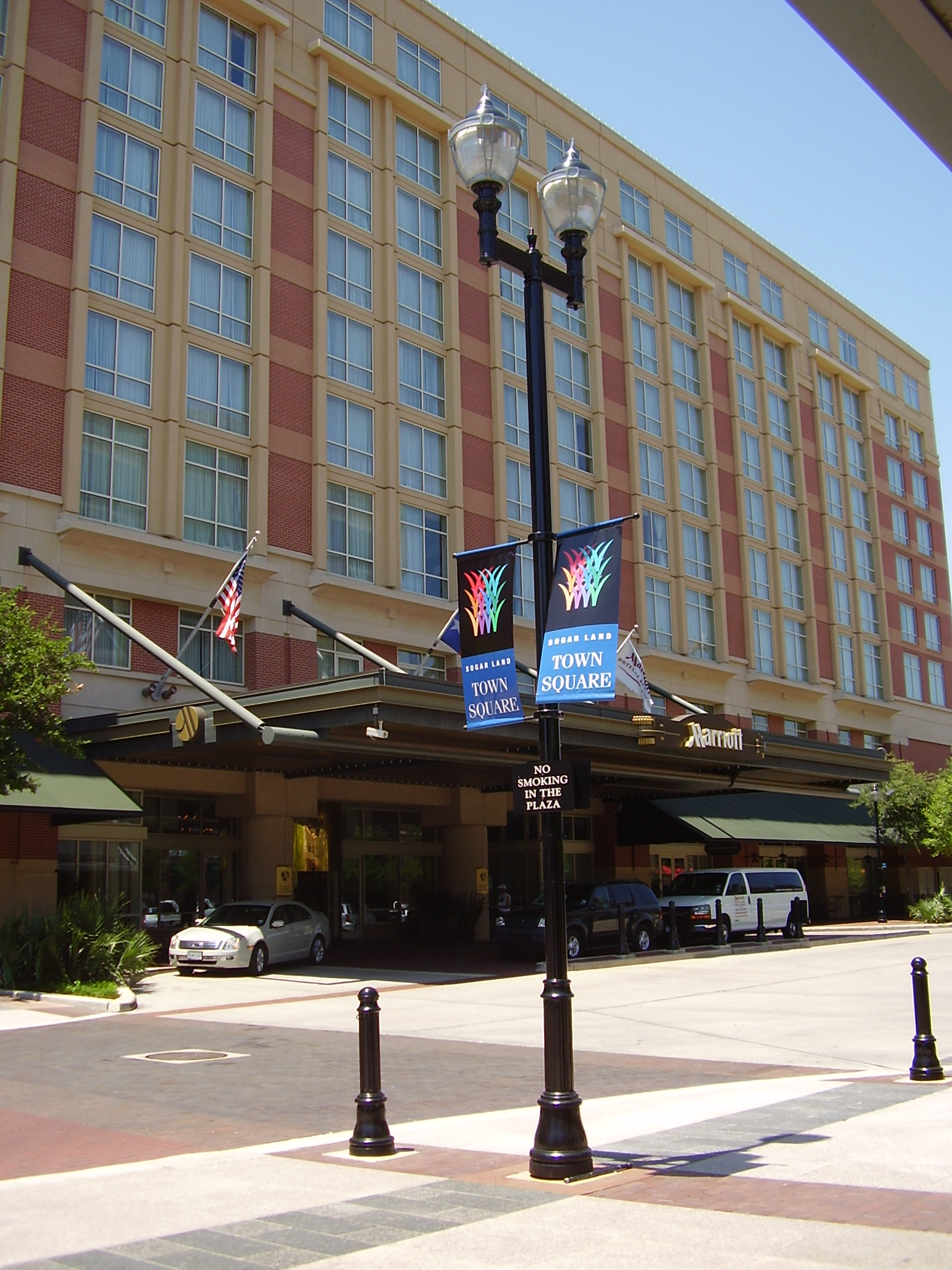
The Sugar Land Marriott and Conference Center was opened to house business travelers to Sugar Land

The Sugar Land City Hall, which had a price tag of $70 million, has 70,000 square feet (6,500 m^{2}) of space. The building may expand by an additional 12,000 square feet (1,100 m^{2}) in case of a population increase in the city limits. The city hall has a lobby with columns and a high-rise ceilings. Each office entrance has wooden doors. When building the city hall, the architect and the general contractor negotiated different construction phases via the "Build-Design" technique, saving the city money.

The 300 room, nine story Sugar Land Marriott and Conference Center, was the first full-service hotel in the complex. Steve Eubanks of Planned Community Developers said that the hotel was added to give businesspersons in the city a place to stay. The Burning Pear, a restaurant, is located on the ground floor of the hotel.

The complex includes a 1.4 acres (0.57 ha) pedestrian plaza with a fountain. The developers intended the plaza to be a space for outdoor performances.
