= Philip Phillips (businessman) =

American businessperson and philanthropist

- Born: Philip Phillippe; January 27, 1874; Memphis, Tennessee, U.S.
- Died: April 8, 1959 (aged 85); Hot Springs, Arkansas, U.S.
- Education: Columbia University (M.D.)
- Occupation: Businessman
- Spouse: Della Wolf
- Children: 2, including Howard Phillips

Philip Phillips (January 27, 1874 – April 18, 1959) was an American businessman. He became a prominent figure in citrus farming in Central Florida and remains known in Orlando for his philanthropy.

== Personal life ==
Philip Phillips was born in Memphis, Tennessee to Henri and Isabelle Phillippe, both originally from France. Henri had come to the United States while serving in the merchant navy under Napoleon III. He spent most of his childhood in Lebanon, Tennessee.

Phillips earned a medical degree from Columbia University in New York, for which he earned the life-long nickname "Doc". He first moved to Florida in 1894 with a $5,000 endowment from his father and bought a grove in Satsuma, but returned to Tennessee when the plants died off during the Great Freeze that same winter. In 1897, Phillips acquired land in Osceola County, which he used as orchards and grazing fields for cattle. In 1901, he married Della Wolf, with whom he had two sons, Howard and Walter. Phillips moved his family to a grove he purchased by Sand Lake near Orlando. Over the years, Phillips built housing and a post office for his guest workers, most from the Bahamas, developing the property into what would later become Dr. Phillips, Florida. In the 1950s, he established a town clinic for black citizens, who were otherwise restricted in accessing medical services in Florida.

He died in Hot Springs, Arkansas and is buried in Doctor Phillips Cemetery.

== Career ==
Phillips initially sold his harvest as produce before he began manufacturing fruit juice at a self-operated plant in 1928. A citrus magnate, he owned more than 5,000 acres (20 km^{2}) of citrus groves across nine Floridian counties in 1920 before selling his industry assets to Granada Groves and Minute Maid in 1954 in a 75%/25% split. In 1953, he established the Dr. P. Phillips Foundation, while Dr. Phillips Inc. remained in the real estate business, particularly as run by his son Howard.

== Legacy ==
Many places and establishments are named in his honor in the Orlando, Florida area, including the community of Dr. Phillips, Florida (a suburb of Orlando), Dr. P. Phillips Baby Place at Winter Park Memorial Hospital, Orlando Health Dr. P. Phillips Hospital, The Dr. Phillips House which is now a restored Historic Inn where Dr. Phillips had lived, Dr. Phillips High School, and the Dr. Phillips Center for the Performing Arts, which opened in 2014, and Dr. Phillips Academic Commons located at UCF's downtown Orlando campus.

The Dr. Phillips name has been a major economic and philanthropic presence in the Central Florida community for over 100 years. Dr. Phillips Charities honors the Phillips family legacy through its support of local nonprofit organizations that live up to the family’s motto of “helping others help themselves” in the areas of health, education, arts, youth, and social services within the Central Florida community, as well as organizations that preserve the free enterprise system and protect private property rights. Dr. Phillips Charities consists of Dr. Phillips, Inc. and The Dr. P. Phillips Foundation. To date, the combined organizations have made grants, pledges and program related investments totaling over $220 million.
