= Somerset Green, Houston =

Community in Houston, Texas, US

Coordinates: 29.786°N 95.442°W

Somerset Green is a gated community in Houston, Texas, developed by Hines Interests Limited Partnership. Nancy Sarnoff of the Houston Chronicle described Somerset Green as "a European-style residential development". Preston Wood & Associates was the land planner of the development.

Located on a 46-acre tract of land inside Houston's Interstate 610 Loop, Somerset Green is a high-end planned community with detached townhome sites, water features and green spaces. The development also contains pocket parks, dog parks, and an amenity area and gathering spot with a resort-style swimming pool.

By October 2013 the company had acquired the property for the development. The companies building houses in the first phase were Coventry Homes, Pelican Builders, and Toll Brothers. Mark Cover, the southwest region executive vice president and CEO of Hines, stated that the housing prices would range from $500,000 to $1 million.

== Geography ==
The 46-acre (19 ha) development is at 6900 Old Katy Road at Somerset Green. The surrounding area consists primarily of businesses, agencies, and industrial warehouses. One large apartment complex is in proximity to the development. Somerset Green is in proximity to the Decorative Center Houston, Houston Transtar, Silver Eagle Distributors, the Houston Society for the Prevention of Cruelty to Animals (SPCA), and the Star Motor Cars automobile dealership. The gated community will have a 24-hour guard.

The plans called for about 500 single family houses, located on small lots. Some houses are three stories tall and some four stories. Sarnoff described the planned density as "a rare find inside Loop 610".

== Education ==
Residents are zoned to schools in the Houston Independent School District. When the development is built, it will be zoned to Sinclair Elementary School, Hogg Middle School, and Waltrip High School.

== Parks and recreation ==
The development plans called for the installation of swimming pools, parks, and community areas. The parks were planned to include pocket parks and dog parks.

== See also ==
- First Colony
- Las Colinas
