= Fruitopia =

Fruit-flavored drink made by the Coca Cola Company

- The original Fruitopia logo
- Type: Fruit-flavored beverage
- Manufacturer: Minute Maid (The Coca-Cola Company)
- Origin: United States
- Introduced: 1994
- Discontinued: 2003 (United States only)
- Flavor: Strawberry Passion Awareness, Kiwiberry Ruckus, Beachside Blast Fruit, Blueberry Watermelon Wisdom, Orange Undercurrent, Tangerine Wavelength, Raspberry Psychic Lemonade, Fruit Integration, Cherry Vanilla Groove
- Website: www.coca-cola.com/ca/en/brands/fruitopia

Fruitopia is a fruit-flavored drink introduced by the Coca-Cola Company's Minute Maid brand in 1994 and targeted at teens and young adults. According to New York Times business reports, it was invented as part of a push by Minute Maid to capitalize on the success of Snapple and other flavored tea drinks. The brand gained substantial hype in the mid-1990s before enduring lagging sales by the decade's end. In 2003, Fruitopia was phased out in most of the United States, where it had struggled for several years. However, select flavors have since been revamped under Minute Maid. Use of the Fruitopia brand name continues through various beverages in numerous countries, including some McDonald's restaurant locations in the United States and Canada, which carry the drink to this day.

== History ==
Fruitopia was a pet project of Coke's former marketing chief, Sergio Zyman. The company spent an initial marketing budget of $30 million, allowing Fruitopia to quickly gain hype in the mid-1990s. Time magazine named Fruitopia one of the Top 10 New Products of 1994, and the beverage was even mentioned on the popular animated series The Simpsons.

The brand's flagship flavor was Strawberry Passion Awareness. This flavor was available at drink fountains as well at McDonald's as Coca-Cola pushed this drink to market in many places. Fruitopia vending machines have also appeared in schools and college campuses in addition to, or as a replacement of, soda.

In addition to the popular Strawberry Passion Awareness, other flavors included The Grape Beyond, Tangerine Wavelength, Citrus Consciousness, Fruit Integration, Pink Lemonade Euphoria, Lemonade Love & Hope, Raspberry Psychic Lemonade, Strawberry Kiwi Ruckus, and Beachside Blast. These flavors were available in the United States while a much wider array was available in the UK. On March 23, 1995, a Fruitopia fruit tea line featuring Born Raspberry, Peaceable Peach, Lemon Berry Intuition, and Curious Mango was introduced in 16-ounce glass bottles. In a drive to remake the brand and remarket it as more relevant to Generation X, however, Coca-Cola dropped several Fruitopia flavors in 1996, added others (such as Beachside Blast and Banana Vanilla Inclination), and renamed others (Citrus Consciousness becoming Citrus Excursion).

=== Advertising ===
Fruitopia television advertisements featured animation using imagery of fruit arrayed in colorful, spinning kaleidoscope patterns. This was accompanied by idealistic aphorisms reminiscent of hippie poetry of the 1960s, such as might be found in advertisements which ran in underground press newspapers of the period. Background music on several of the ads was provided by the Muffs, Kate Bush, and Cocteau Twins. An example ad copy ran as follows:

there is a wonderful
person inside you who
is dying to get out.

please drink a
raspberry
psychic lemonade
for him/her.

Its recurring slogan was "Fruitopia: for the mind, body, and planet."

=== Trial in Greece ===
In 1997, Greek writer Eugene Trivizas won the first stage of a legal battle against Coca-Cola. This prevented the multinational company from registering Fruitopia as a trademark for soft drinks, as it was already trademarked for the title of his TV serial and comic-strip books. The court decided that Coca-Cola had unlawfully appropriated Trivizas' intellectual property. Coca-Cola appealed against the decision and, in December 1999, the relevant court of appeal ruled once again in his favor prohibiting the use of Trivizas' intellectual property as a trademark for soft drinks.

=== 2000s drawback ===
By the end of the 1990s, Fruitopia had struggled to be profitable. In 2003, the Fruitopia line was all but discontinued in the United States, with some flavors being revamped under the Minute Maid moniker. A similar situation occurred with PepsiCo, who replaced their own Snapple clone, Fruit Works, with the enduring Tropicana moniker.

== See also ==
- Snapple
- OK Soda
