= Howard Phillips (philanthropist) =

American philanthropist

Howard Phillips (March 27, 1902 – 1979) was a prominent businessman who was particularly active in Central Florida. He worked in the citrus operations of his father, Dr. Philip Phillips, and took over his philanthropic organization after his father's death in 1959.

Like his father, Howard has several places named after him in Orlando, Florida, including Howard Phillips Hall, one of the central buildings at the University of Central Florida, and the Howard Phillips Center for Children & Families, a center for troubled families which is part of Arnold Palmer Hospital for Children.
