= Simply Beverages =

American fruit juice brand

Simply Beverages (The Simply Orange Juice Company)
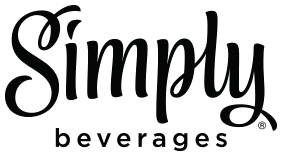
- Logo since 2018
- Product type: Beverage, fruit juice
- Current owner: Minute Maid (subsidiary of The Coca-Cola Company)
- Country: United States; Canada
- Introduced: July 29, 2001; 25 years ago
- Tagline: 100% unfooled around with (2001-2003); Simply unfooled around with (2003-2007); Honestly Simple (2007-2022); Say yes to simple (since 2022)
- Website: www.drinksimplybeverages.com

Simply Beverages (also known as the Simply Orange Juice Company) is an American fruit juice company based in Apopka, Florida that was founded on July 29, 2001 and is a brand of The Coca-Cola Company. It makes several not-from-concentrate orange juices and other fruit juices that are sold refrigerated in a clear plastic bottle with a green twist top and large green seal. The bottles have a wide body that starts tapering to a narrow neck at the top of the label.

The company, Simply Orange, is a major buyer of Florida oranges for its orange juice but also imports orange juice from Brazil and Mexico. It uses a computer-modeled system to blend the juice sources for a uniform taste throughout the year.

== History ==
The company was founded on July 29, 2001 by Minute Maid, launching three varieties of "Simply Orange" in the Northeastern United States: "Original", "Original with Calcium" and "Grove Made". By 2003, the company expanded to the Southeastern United States and achieved national distribution, adding a fourth variety "Country Stand with Calcium", and also "Minute Maid Simply Orange" was introduced in Canada by 2004.

In 2006, the "Simply" line expanded with the launch of "Simply Lemonade" and "Simply Limeade", and "Minute Maid Simply Orange" was changed to "Simply Orange" in Canada at the same year. The Simply Orange Juice Company announced the addition of "Simply Grapefruit" and "Simply Apple" in August 2007 and began shipping to retailers in mid-September. "Simply Orange with Mango" and "Simply Orange with Pineapple" were added in mid-August 2008. In February 2009, "Simply Lemonade with Raspberry" became available. In January 2012, "Simply Cranberry Cocktail" and "Simply Lemonade with Mango" were released. In 2015, the company introduced 3 new flavors: "Simply Fruit Punch", "Simply Tropical", and "Simply Mixed Berry". The company introduced "Simply Peach" and "Simply Lemonade with Strawberry" in 2017. In 2018, the size of the 59oz bottles was reduced to 52oz to reduce production costs. The company also launched the "Simply Light" brand with fewer calories and less sugar in the same year. In 2019, the company has introduced called "Simply Watermelon" and "Simply Smoothies", but the Smoothies product has been discontinued 5-6 years later. In 2020, "Simply Almond" was introduced. Then 1 year later, Simply Oat was released, and these two discontinued 3 years later. In June 2022, the company introduced a new product called "Simply Spiked Lemonade". In 2023, the company introduced 4 new products called "Simply Mixology", "Simply Pineapple", "Simply Grape", and "Simply Spiked Peach". In 2024, "Simply Spiked Limeade", "Simply Strawberry", "Simply Mango", and a limited time product called "Simply Spiked Cranberry" were released, and "Simply Mixed Berry" was discontinued at the same year.

In 2025, Simply Spiked has introduced two new products called "Simply Spiked Tropical" and "Simply Spiked Bold". The company launched the "Simply Pop" brand, a line of shelf-stable, fruit-flavored prebiotic sodas. Also, "Simply Mixology" and "Simply Spiked Peach" were discontinued, the rest of Simply Orange products were reduced from 52 fl. oz to 46 fl. oz, and the rest of Simply Beverages products were reduced from 89 fl. oz to 76 fl. oz at the same year.

In March 2026, "Simply Limeade with Cherry" and "Simply Spiked Bolder" were introduced.

In the upcoming date, the rest of Simply Beverages products are reduced from 52 fl. oz to 46 fl. oz.

== Controversy ==
In January 2023, a consumer class-action lawsuit was filed against the Simply Orange Juice Company, alleging that the company falsely markets its “Simply Tropical Juice” as all-natural while withholding information on its high PFAS (per- and poly-fluoroalkyl substances) content.

== Advertising ==
Actor Donald Sutherland was the voice of commercials for the Simply brand of juices and juice drinks from 2001 until 2022. Eugene Cordero is the current actor of commercials for Simply Beverages since 2022. Donald Sutherland's death in 2024.

== See also ==
- Agriculture in Florida
