= 2000 St. James Place =

Office building in Houston, Texas

Coordinates: 29.7457°N 95.4732°W

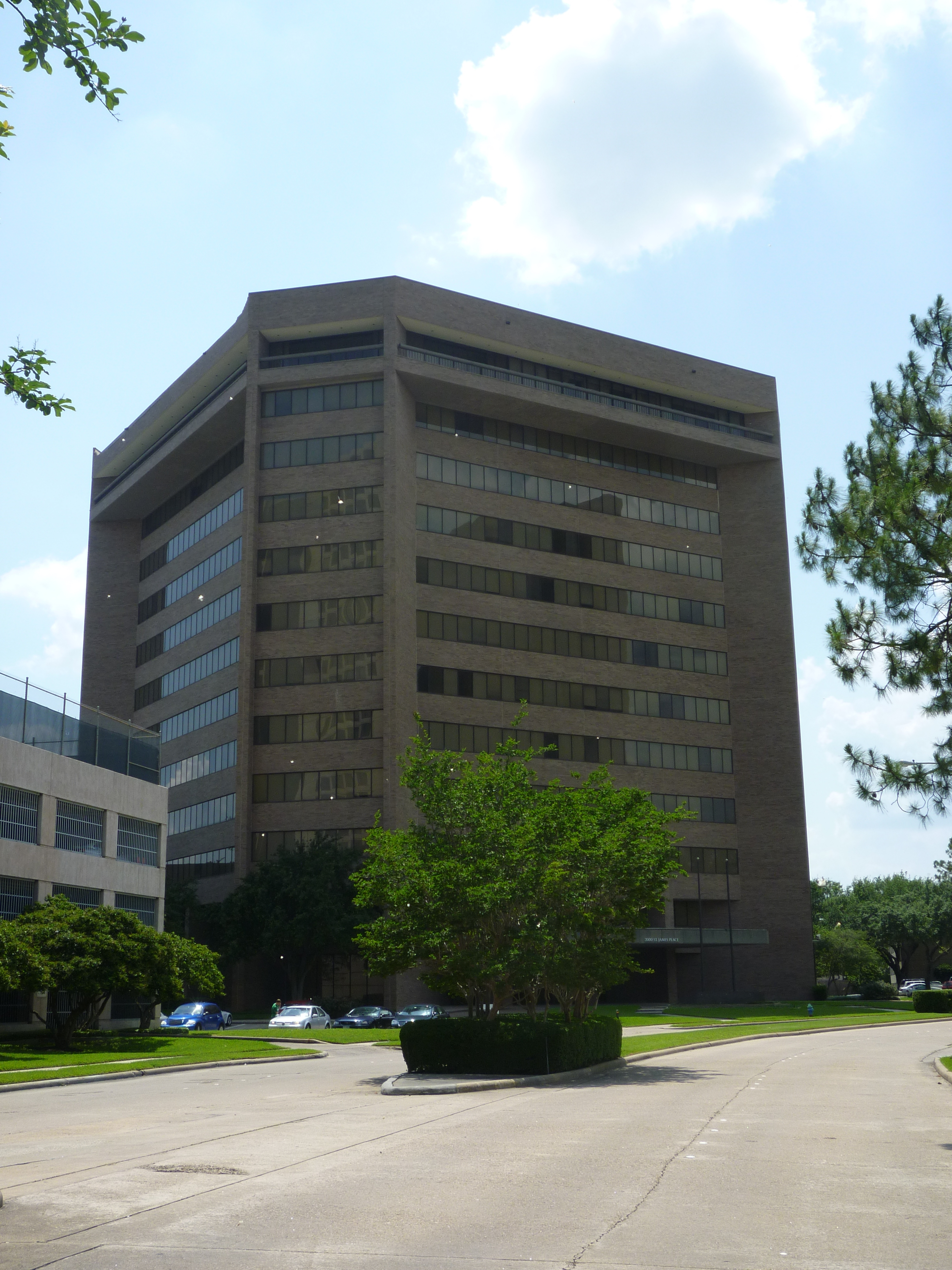
2000 St. James Place

2000 St. James Place is a 12-story, 335,000 square foot (31,100 m2) office building in Houston, Texas. It formerly housed the headquarters of Minute Maid. The building is located on a 6 acres (2.4 ha) site, and is in proximity to The Galleria.

== History ==
2000 St. James Place was built in 1978. In 1985, The Coca-Cola Company purchased the property from Bechtel Corporation, to be used as the headquarters of Minute Maid, a subsidiary of Coca-Cola. Minute Maid moved into 2000 St. James Place in 1986. In 2006, the building underwent an $11.8 million renovation. In 2007, Coca-Cola sold the building to Cameron Management, Wachovia Bank (now Wells Fargo), and a group of local investors for an undisclosed amount. Coca-Cola then leased 150,000 square feet (14,000 m^{2}) of space in the building to continue housing the Minute Maid headquarters until the headquarters were moved to Sugar Land Town Square in Sugar Land, Texas. Anticipating the departure of Minute Maid, Cameron Management planned to market the building as having the largest block of contiguous office space in the Uptown area.

=== Post Minute Maid ===
On February 16, 2009, Minute Maid moved its headquarters from 2000 St. James Place to Sugar Land Town Square. In 2009, 2000 St. James Place became the only office building in Texas—and one of only 49 buildings in the United States—to receive the LEED-EB v2.0 Gold certification. In 2010, Wachovia Bank foreclosed the vacant building, taking it from owner Cameron Management Inc. The building was offered for sale on May 4, 2010 at the Harris County courthouse, but there were no buyers.

=== Weatherford ===
In late 2010, Weatherford International signed a lease agreement on the entire property. With the relocation of Weatherford to this building, Luby's Inc., particularly their Culinary Services Division, now serves as their cafeteria provider. A Salad Bar, Deli, Main Line, Global Bar, Juice Bar, and Grill is open every weekday from 7:00am–10:00am for breakfast and 11:00am–2:00pm for lunch.

== Design ==
Nearly one third of the building's site is landscaped to reduce heat island effects and storm water drainage. The property has high efficiency chillers installed, an automation control system managed through a Web-based user interface, and to save energy, designers coated the roof with special material. The building has a cafeteria, a fitness center, and 1,230 parking spaces.
