= Minute Maid =

American beverage company

The Minute Maid Company
- Industry: Beverage
- Founded: April 30, 1946; 80 years ago
- Key people: J. Alexander M. Douglas Jr. (President of North America Group of Coca-Cola)
- Products: Fruit juices, soft drinks
- Number of employees: 1,900
- Parent: The Coca-Cola Company
- Subsidiaries: Simply Beverages
- Website: minutemaid.com

Minute Maid is an American brand of beverages, usually associated with lemonade or orange juice, but which now extends to soft drinks of different kinds, including Hi-C. Minute Maid was the first company to market frozen orange juice concentrate, allowing it to be distributed throughout the United States and served year-round.

The Minute Maid Company is owned by the Coca-Cola Company, the world's largest marketer of fruit juices and drinks. The company was originally incorporated around 1944 as Vacuum Foods Corporation. It employs over 1,900 people and has over $2 billion in sales (1997 est.).MinuteMaid is sold under the Cappy brand in Central Europe, under the name Del Valle in Latin America, and under the brand "Моя Семья" (Moya sem'ya, "My Family") in Russia and the Commonwealth of Independent States.

== History ==
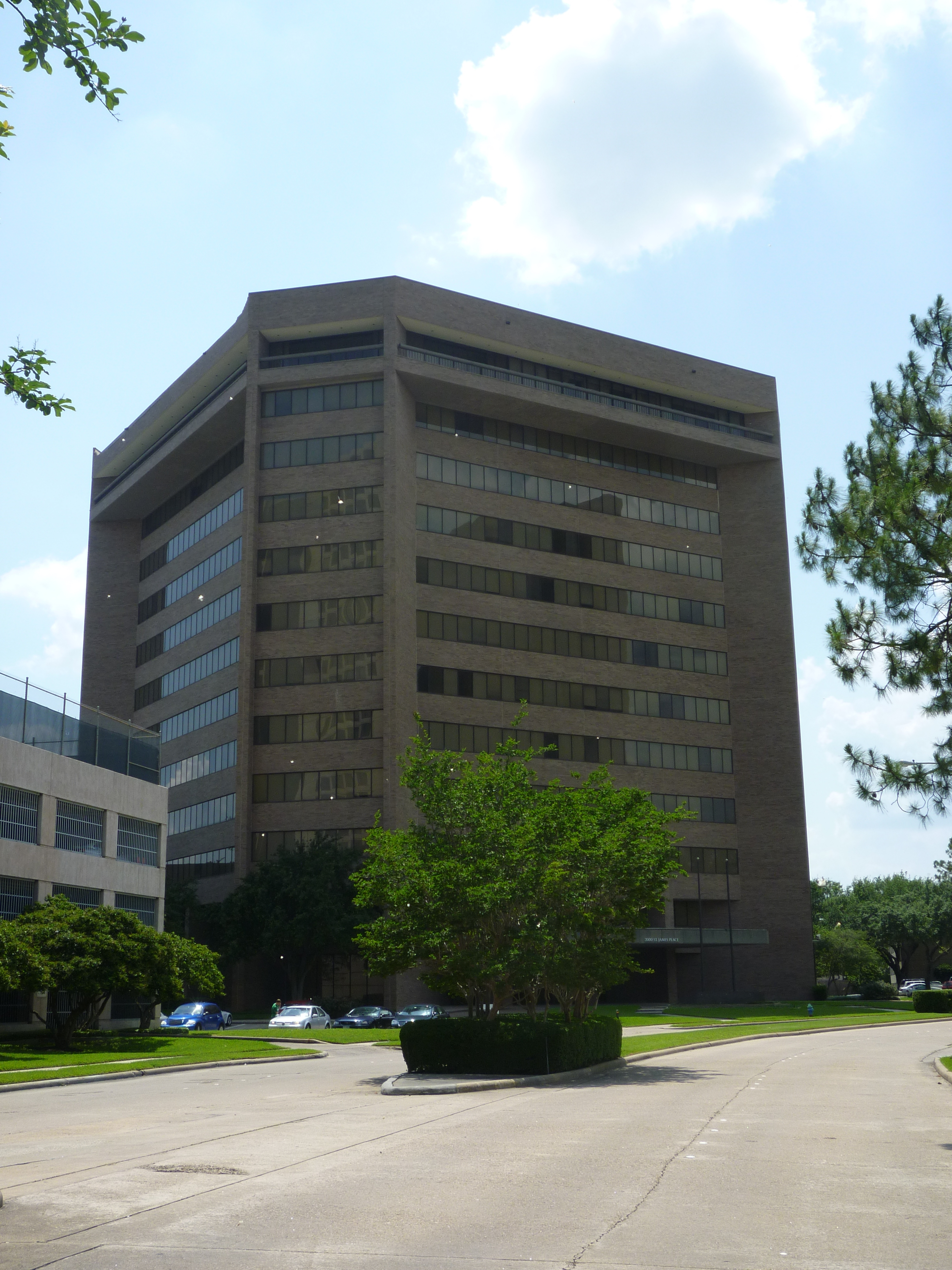
2000 St. James Place, the former Minute Maid headquarters, in Houston, Texas

In 1944, the National Research Corporation (NRC) of Boston, Massachusetts, developed a method of dehydrating medical products for use in the U.S. war effort. The US Army wanted to extend this process to nutritious food, so NRC created a new subsidiary, Vacuum Foods Corporation. Led by John M. Fox, the firm won a government contract worth $750,000 for 500,000 lb (227,000 kg) of powdered orange juice for the war. The war ended and the contract was canceled before the factory could be built, but with investment, the company moved forward with a product.

Rather than selling powder to the public market, the company decided to create frozen orange juice concentrate, using a process that eliminated 80 percent of the water in orange juice. Boston marketing firm H. A. Loudon Advertising came up with the name Minute Maid, implying the juice was quick and easy to prepare.

The first shipment took place on April 30, 1946. With limited funds for advertising, Fox himself went door to door giving free samples, until demand skyrocketed. In October 1948, TIME magazine announced that entertainer Bing Crosby was to employ a five-day-a-week radio show to promote Minute Maid. The magazine article gave further details:

Minute Maid (retail price: 29¢ a pint and a half) got into the field first in 1945, at a new $2,300,000 plant in Plymouth, Fla. With little cash to advertise, it lost $450,262 the first two years. Last year it finally turned the corner. Says Vacuum’s President John M. Fox: "Why, this orange juice thing is the wonder of the grocery world. Ask anybody." Anybody in the frozen food industry agreed—and Birds Eye, Snow Crop and others began to put out their own concentrate. Nevertheless, Vacuum's sales increased so much that President Fox announced last week that the net profit for its last fiscal year was $179,865. Demand is so great, said Fox, that Vacuum has had to allocate shipments and is thinking of setting up a California plant. The shortage temporarily takes some of the bloom off the Crosby deal. But Vacuum hopes to step up output enough to fill the new orders Crosby will bring in. And in the scramble for the new market, Vacuum figures that Crosby is just the Pied Piper needed to lure customers away from the old brand names.

The Crosby radio show ran until October 1950 and the ability to purchase fresh-tasting orange juice at any time of year, far from where oranges are grown, proved popular, and led to the company's national success.

On October 5, 1949, the company's board approved a motion to adopt the name Minute Maid Corporation In late 1954, Minute Maid purchased rival Snow Crop.

The Minute Maid Corporation merged into Coca-Cola in December 1960, becoming a division.

In 1967, Minute Maid relocated to Houston, Texas, and joined with Duncan Foods to form the Coca-Cola Foods division.

In 1970, the company was involved in a scandal in the United States about bad housing, often referred to as "slave quarters", and working conditions of Minute Maid farm laborers in Florida. The United Farm Workers stepped in to support the workers. NBC reported on the issue in a 1970 documentary called Chet Huntley's Migrant: An NBC White Paper. In response to the bad press and a boycott in Florida, the company established a program that improved the workers' situation.

In 1973, the company released its first ready-to-drink, chilled orange juice product in the United States, entering an "orange juice war" with Tropicana.

In 1996, the company's name was changed from Minute Maid Corp. to The Minute Maid Company.

The Coca-Cola Company sold its Minute Maid orange groves in Florida in 1997. The United Farm Workers again took the side of the orange growers during this time.

In 2001, the Minute Maid division of Coca-Cola launched the Simply Orange brand, which "uses a computer-modeled blending of citrus sources with the intent for the consumer to enjoy a uniform taste year-round".

Former logo, used since 2017.

In 2002, Minute Maid bought the naming rights to re-brand the Houston Astros ballpark from Enron Field to Minute Maid Park.

In 2003, Minute Maid's division fully merged with Coca-Cola North America.

In September 2024, Coca-Cola issued a recall on an estimated 13,152 cases of mislabeled Minute Maid Zero Sugar Lemonade for containing sugar.

In January 2026, Coca-Cola announced it would discontinue the Minute Maid frozen juice line in the US and Canada that quarter.

== Headquarters ==
Minute Maid original offices were located in New York. John M Fox, president of the company announced on October 20, 1957, that Minute Maid Headquarters would be moved to a new building located on the corner of US 441 and Hwy Route 50 in Orlando, Florida.

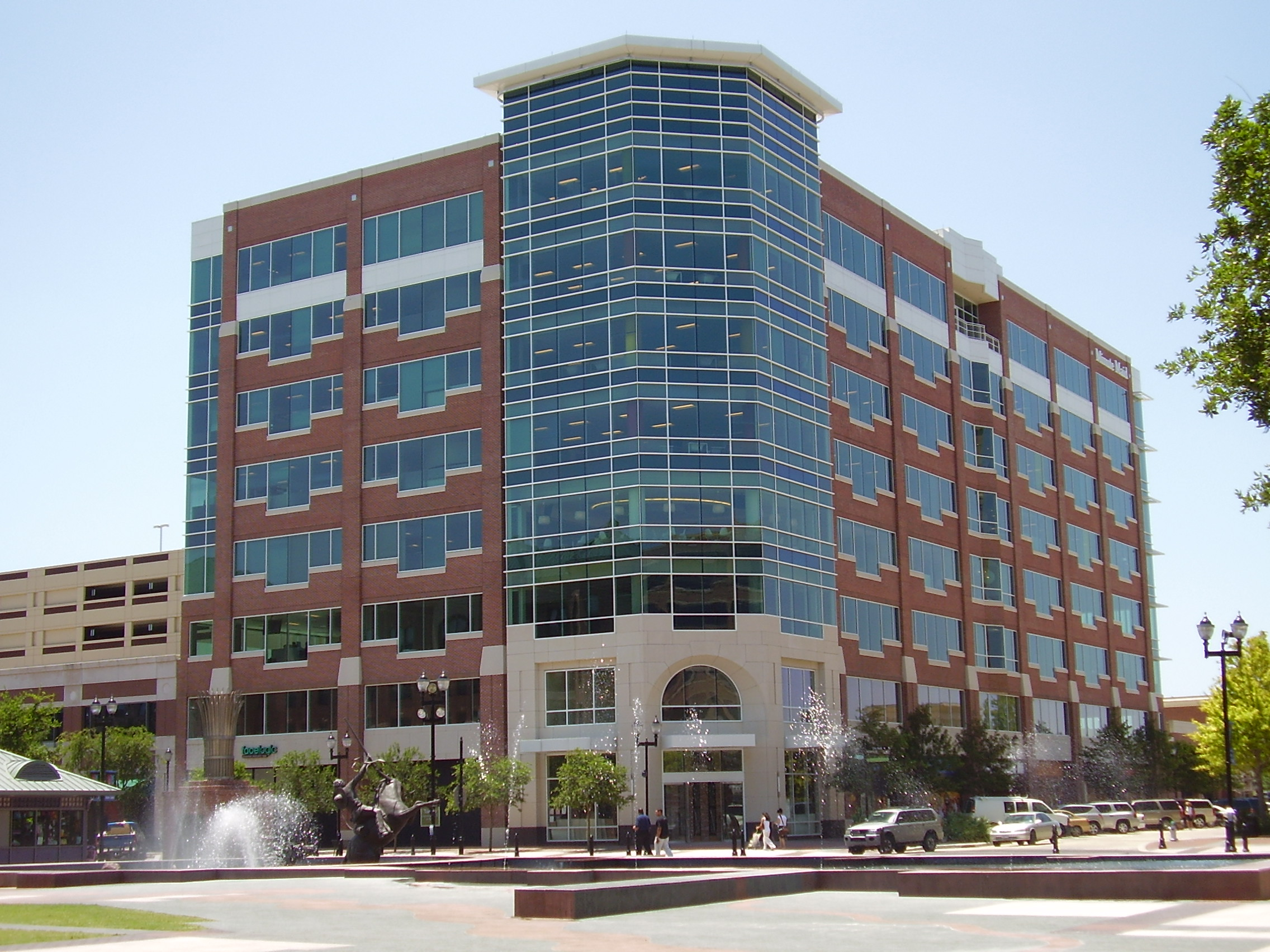
Headquarters of Minute Maid in Sugar Land Town Square, First Colony, Sugar Land, Texas, United States

Minute Maid has its headquarters in an office building in the Sugar Land Town Square development in First Colony, Sugar Land, Texas.

In 1985, The Coca-Cola Company purchased the 2000 St. James Place in Houston from Bechtel Corporation for Minute Maid. Minute Maid moved into the new office building the following year.

In 2007, Coca-Cola retained New York-based Corporate Realty Consultants and Boyd Commercial LLC of Houston to sell 2000 St. James Place. The company negotiated with Planned Community Developers to lease an office building in Sugar Land Town Square. Then, in January 2008, Minute Maid announced plans to move its headquarters to Sugar Land. The headquarters building is located at Sugar Land's town center and opened on February 16, 2009. The city of Sugar Land gave the company a $2.4 million tax incentive to move its headquarters there.

On March 6, 2021, amid the COVID-19 pandemic, Coca-Cola announced it was closing Minute Maid's office in Sugar Land and would join the operations with the company's base in Atlanta, Georgia.

== See also ==
- Economy of Houston
- List of lemonade topics
