= Eyeo festival =

Eyeo Festival
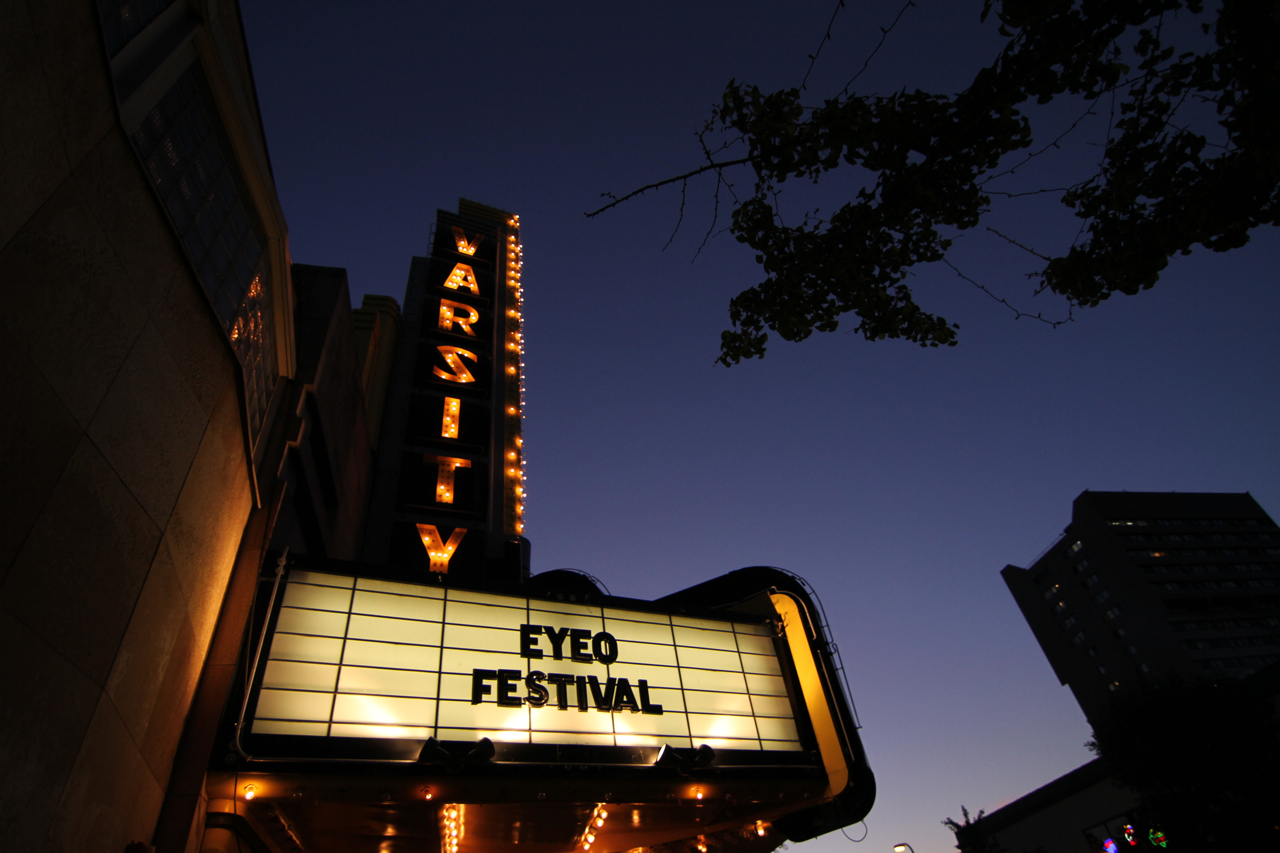
- Marquee of the Varsity Theater from the 2011 eyeo festival
- Dates: June (dates vary, but typically the first weekend of the month)
- Frequency: Annual
- Locations: Minneapolis, Minnesota, U.S.
- Years active: 10
- Founders: Dave Schroeder, Jer Thorp, Caitlin Rae Hargarten, Wes Grubbs
- Website: http://eyeofestival.com

The Eyeo Festival was a yearly conference for artists who work with data and code. The annual conference began in 2011, at the Walker Art Center in Minneapolis. Due to the COVID-19 pandemic, the event was put on pause for 2020 and 2021. Eyeo returned to Minneapolis in 2022, but was later put back on hiatus for 2023. There have been no updates on if/when Eyeo will be return.

== Organizers and speakers ==
The event was organized by Dave Schroeder, Jer Thorp, Caitlin Rae Hargarten, and Wes Grubbs.

The conference features speakers who work in data visualization, creative coders and hackers. Past speakers include Amanda Cox, Stefanie Posavec and Giorgia Lupi (who met at eyeo in 2013), Mike Bostock, Nicholas Felton, Adam Harvey, Paola Antonelli, Roman Verostko, Frieder Nake, Lillian Schwartz, Fernanda Viégas and Martin Wattenberg, Ben Fry, Rachel Binx, Moritz Stefaner, Jenny Odell, Lauren McCarthy, Kyle McDonald, Samuel Sinyangwe, Zachary Lieberman, Golan Levin, Everest Pipkin, Meredith Whittaker, Catherine D'Ignazio, Nadieh Bremer.
