= Mark Henry Hansen =

American statistician (born 1964)

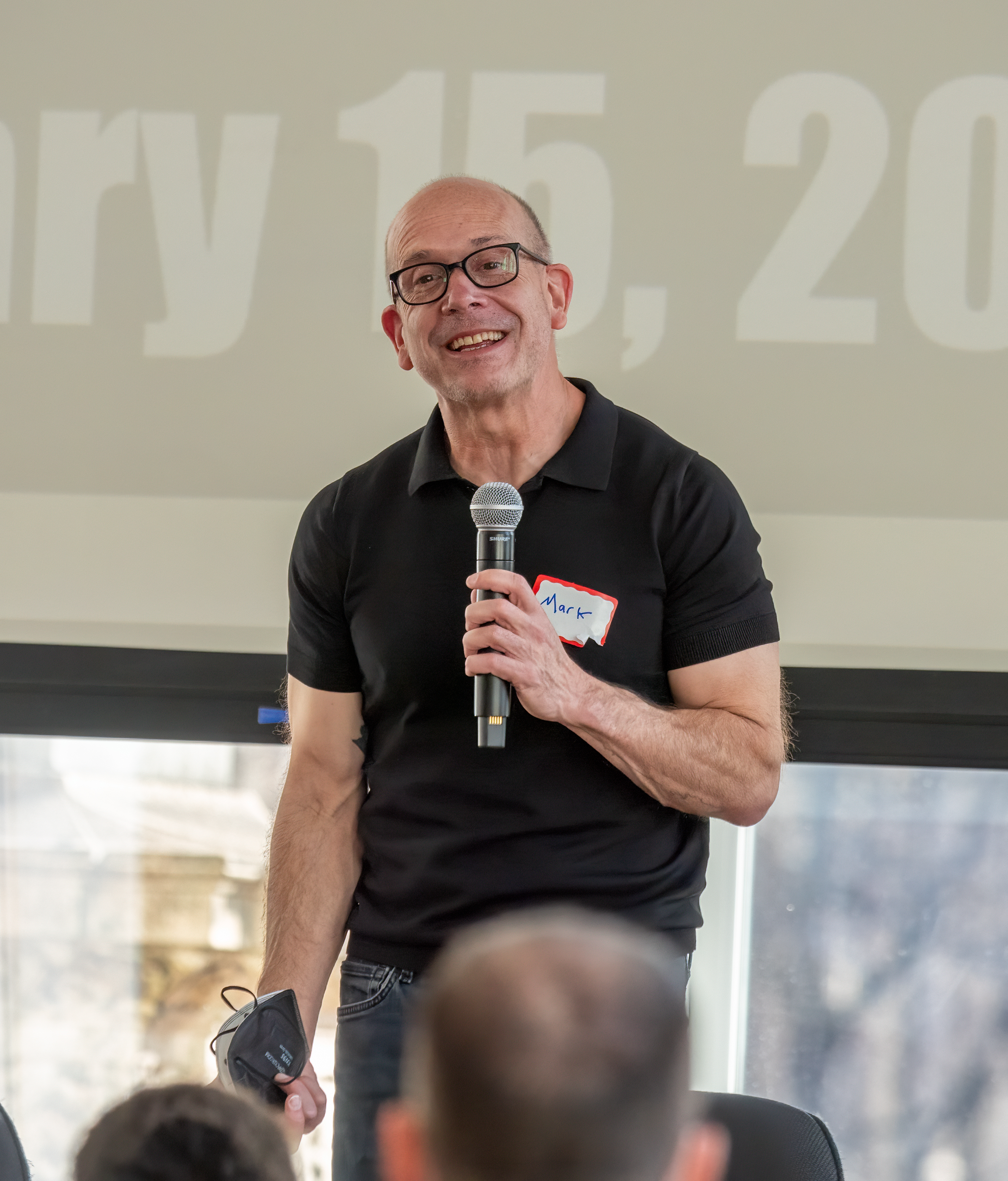
- Hansen at a Wikipedia event in 2024
- Born: 1964 (age 61–62); Petaluma, California, U.S.
- Education: University of California, Davis (BA); University of California, Berkeley (MA, PhD)
- Scientific career
- Fields: Statistics
- Workplaces: Brown Institute for Media Innovation, Columbia University Graduate School of Journalism
- Doctoral advisor: Charles Joel Stone
- Doctoral students: Nathan Yau

Mark Henry Hansen (born 1964) is an American statistician, professor at the Columbia University Graduate School of Journalism and Director of the David and Helen Gurley Brown Institute for Media Innovation. His special interest is the intersection of data, art and technology. He adopts an interdisciplinary approach to data science, drawing on various branches of applied mathematics, information theory and new media arts. Within the field of journalism, Hansen has promoted computational literacy for journalists.

== Early life ==
Hansen was born in 1964 in Petaluma, California. He graduated from Fremont High School in Sunnyvale, California.

Hansen received a Bachelor of Science degree in applied mathematics from the University of California, Davis in 1987. He later earned a Master of Arts in 1991 and a PhD in 1994 from the University of California, Berkeley in Statistics. His graduate advisor was Charles Stone.

== Career ==
After getting his PhD in 1994, Hansen went on to be a Member of the Technical Staff at the Statistics Research Department of Bell Laboratories.

After 8 years at Bell, he became a professor at the University of California, Los Angeles, teaching there for 9 years in the Department of Statistics, the Department of Design Media Arts, and the Department of Electrical Engineering. While at UCLA, he studied sensor networks as a Co-Principal Investigator for the Center for Embedded Networked Sensing, He is known for being the graduate advisor for statistics students including Nathan Yau of FlowingData and Jake Porway of The Numbers Game and DataKind. He was one of the founders of the Office for Creative Research, with Jer Thorp and Ben Rubin.

In 2012, he joined Columbia's Graduate School of Journalism as a professor, and as director of the David and Helen Gurley Brown Institute for Media Innovation. He was also a long-standing visiting researcher at the New York Times R&D Lab and served as a consultant with HBO Sports.

== Patents ==
1. U.S. Patent No. 9,135,576 (assignee, The New York Times Company). System for and method of generating and visualizing sharing event cascade structures associated with content sharing events that occur across a network. With J. Thorp, awarded September 2015.
2. U.S. Patent No. 7,194,454. Method for organizing records of database search activity by topical relevance. With E. Shriver, awarded March 2017.
3. U.S. Patent No. 6,647,383. System and method for providing interactive dialogue and iterative search functions to find information. With K. August, C. Chuang, D. Lee, M. McNerney, C. Nohl, P. Ong, E. Shriver, and T. Sizer, awarded November 2003.
4. U.S. Patent No. 6,449,604. Method for characterizing and visualizing patterns of usage of a Web site by network users (II). With W. Sweldens, awarded September 2002.
5. U.S. Patent No. 6,424,745. Method and Apparatus for Object Recognition. With H. Hess, P. Mitra, and G. Thomas, awarded July, 2002.
6. U.S. Patent No. 6,182,097. Method for characterizing and visualizing patterns of usage of a Web site by network users (I). With W. Sweldens, awarded January 2001.
7. U.S. Patent No. 6,075,594. System and Method for Spectroscopic Product Recognition and Identification. With D. X. Sun and G. Thomas, awarded June 2000.
8. U.S. Patent No. 5,240,866. A Method for Characterizing Defects in Integrated Circuits. With D. Friedman, J. R. Hoyer and V. N. Nair, awarded August, 1993.

== Artwork ==
Throughout his work at Bell, UCLA and Columbia, Hansen has produced and continues to create data driven art exhibits. He has worked with Ben Rubin, founder of EAR Studio and now with the New School. Hansen's collaborative work has been on display at the Museum of Modern Art in New York City, Centro de Arte Reina Sofia in Madrid, Science Museum, London, the Cartier Foundation in Paris, the Whitney Museum, La Panacée in Montpellier, the San Jose Museum of Art, and was exhibited in the lobbies of the New York Times Building and the Public Theater.

=== Listening Post ===
Listening Post is a visual and auditory art exhibit made by Mark Hansen and Ben Rubin. Through machine learning techniques, fragments of conversations from chatrooms and forums across the Internet are displayed and read aloud in real time. The piece opened at the Brooklyn Academy of Music in New York, but has been displayed all over the world. Listening Post received the 2004 Golden Nica for Interactive Art from Ars Electronica, and copies have been acquired by the San Jose Museum of Art and Science Museum, London.

=== Moveable Type ===
Mark Hansen and Ben Rubin were partners in the creation of Moveable Type, on display in the lobby of The New York Times building in midtown Manhattan from November of 2007. This piece builds off of “Listening Post,” displaying choreographed patterns of words and phrases in real time from data produced by The New York Times. Moveable Type assembles a database consisting of articles from the first newspaper in 1851 to the present day, specialty collections of Times' content including the crossword puzzles and the recipes, and Web commentaries from Times' readers. The piece then creates choreographed displays of data, divided into scenes, each scene devoted to some aspect of the day's news.

=== Shakespeare Machine ===
Ben Rubin, Mark Hansen, Jer Thorp, Michele Gorman. Hansen collaborated with Ben Rubin, Jer Thorp and Michele Gorman for the Shakespeare Machine project in 2012. Over the bar in the center of the lobby of the Public Theater in New York City, the team constructed a chandelier, a digital display consisting of 37 LED panels, one for each of Shakespeare's plays. The piece finds and displays phrases from Shakespeare’s work that share common rhetorical structures.

=== Shuffle and A Sort of Joy ===
Hansen and Rubin collaborated with the Elevator Repair Service and Rebecca Mead to create the theatrical performance Shuffle drawing from the texts of The Great Gatsby, The Sun Also Rises, and The Sound and the Fury, each used previously as a script for an ERS production. Shuffle debuted at the New York Public Library. As the Office for Creative Research, Thorp, Hansen and Rubin produced a second piece with the Elevator Repair Service through the Museum of Modern Art's Artist's Experiments Program. Using MoMA's collections database, A Sort of Joy (Thousands of Exhausted Things) was performed in the museum's second floor galleries. ERS actors received randomized scripts drawn from the titles, artist names, materials and dimensions of the artworks in MoMA's collection.

=== Timescape ===
Hansen collaborated with Ben Rubin, Jer Thorp, and Local Projects to create Timescape, an installation in the 9/11 memorial museum. The installation pulls articles from over 100 news sources to create an ever-evolving timeline of the social, cultural, political and economic impacts of the 9/11 attacks that are still felt today.

=== The Brain Index ===
The Brain Index was a collaboration between Hansen and Laura Kurgan of the Center for Spatial Research at Columbia University. It allowed users to interact with data about the human brain, distributed across many large scale displays.

== Journalistic work ==
Hansen's art work and journalistic work often intersect. In 2010, Hansen collaborated with Jer Thorp and Jake Porway to create Project Cascade, a tool to visualize connections between articles shared on Twitter. The project grew out of Hansen's work with the New York Times R&D labs.

Hansen's Computational Journalism course at Columbia Journalism School contributed reporting on the 2018 New York Times piece, The Follower Factory, which exposed the wave of fake Twitter followers being bought and sold online. That article was ultimately cited by Twitter as the reason for its July, 2018 "purge" of tens of millions of suspicious accounts. The piece was part of a package of stories from the New York Times that was awarded a James Polk award for National Reporting, and was a Finalist for a Pulitzer Prize in National Reporting.
