= Patrick Gallagher (designer) =

American museum designer

- Born: January 30, 1956 (age 70)
- Education: Northern Illinois University
- Known for: Exhibit Design, Interactive Experiences, Storytelling
- Website: www.gallagherdesign.com

Patrick Gallagher (born January 30, 1956) is an American designer and the President and Founder of Gallagher & Associates (G&A), a global museum planning and design firm with offices in Washington, D.C., New York City, San Francisco, and Singapore.

== Personal ==
Gallagher was president of the Society for Environmental Graphic Design (SEGD) from 2000 to 2001. In 2012, he received the SEGD Fellow Award for his contributions to the field of graphic design. Gallagher is a graduate of Northern Illinois University. He has won industry awards, and his projects have been recognized worldwide.

== Gallagher & Associates ==
Gallagher & Associates
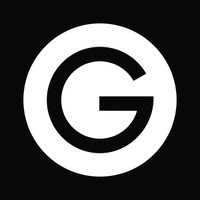
- Trade name: Gallagher Design
- Company type: Private limited company
- Industry: Design and Architecture
- Founded: 1998
- Founder: Patrick Gallagher
- Headquarters: 11th Floor; 494 8th Avenue; New York City; United States
- Number of locations: Silver Spring, Maryland; New York City; Portland, Oregon; Singapore
- Area served: Worldwide
- Key people: Patrick Gallagher (President & Owner)
- Services: Exhibition design consultancy services
- Number of employees: 100–150 (2019)
- Website: Gallagher Design

Gallagher & Associates' most extensive experience is in masterplanning and creating visitor experiences. Gallagher's work on the International Spy Museum complex, shaped a new model for the museum. G&A was one of the first design firms in the United States to fully plan and execute a for-profit model for a museum, and the International Spy Museum was credited with helping to shape the face of a new downtown area that incorporated a new business model.

Notable projects of G&A include the Grammy Museum at L.A. Live, The Grammy Museum Mississippi, the Shanghai Natural History Museum, The Witte Museum, The National WWII Museum in New Orleans, Oklahoma City National Memorial & Museum, Oklahoma and the Museum of the Jewish People at Beit Hatfutsot in Tel Aviv, Israel.

== Works ==
Selected projects include:

=== Cultural & History ===
- Armenian American Museum in Glendale, California
- Institute for Emerging Issues at the North Carolina State University.
- International Spy Museum in Washington, D.C.
- Franklin D. Roosevelt Presidential Library and Museum in New York.
- George Washington’s Mount Vernon in Alexandria, Virginia.
- Gettysburg National Military Park in Gettysburg, Pennsylvania.
- Lyndon Baines Johnson Library and Museum in Austin, Texas.
- May 4 Visitors Center at Kent State University in Ohio.
- National Archives in Washington, D.C.
- National Center for Civil and Human Rights in Atlanta, Georgia.
- National Cowboy & Western Heritage Museum in Oklahoma City.
- National Medal of Honor Museum in Mount Pleasant, South Carolina.
- The National WWII Museum in New Orleans.

Oklahoma City National Memorial & Museum, Oklahoma

- Palace of the Governors in Santa Fe, New Mexico.
- Normandy American Cemetery and Memorial in Normandy, France.
- Ronald Reagan Presidential Library, Simi Valley, California.
- Some Were Neighbors at the United States Holocaust Memorial Museum in Washington, D.C.
- World of Coca-Cola in Atlanta.
- William H. Gross Gallery, National Postal Museum in Washington, D.C.

=== Music & The Arts ===
- Academy Museum of Motion Pictures in Hollywood, CA
- Gallery One at the Cleveland Museum of Art in Cleveland, Ohio
- Grammy Museum at L.A. Live in Los Angeles
- The Grammy Museum Mississippi in Cleveland, Mississippi
- Indian Music Experience in Bangalore, India
- National Gallery Singapore in Singapore
- The National Blues Museum in St. Louis
- Woody Guthrie Center in Tulsa, Oklahoma

=== Religion & Heritage ===
- Maltz Museum of Jewish Heritage in Cleveland, Ohio
- Museum of the Jewish People at Beit Hatfutsot in Tel Aviv, Israel
- National Museum of American Jewish History in Philadelphia
- Saint John Paul II National Shrine in Washington, D.C.

=== Science ===
- Natural History Museum of Los Angeles County in Los Angeles
- New York State Museum in Albany, New York
- The Witte Museum in San Antonio, Texas

=== Sports ===
- College Football Hall of Fame in Atlanta
- Kentucky Derby Museum in Louisville, Kentucky,
- United States Olympics Museum in Colorado Springs, Colorado,

== See also ==
- Ralph Appelbaum Associates, U.S. firm
- Event Communications, U.K. firm
- Local Projects, U.S. firm
- Cultural tourism
- Exhibit design
- Exhibition designer
