= Grammy Museum =

Group of museums devoted to the Grammy Award and its winners

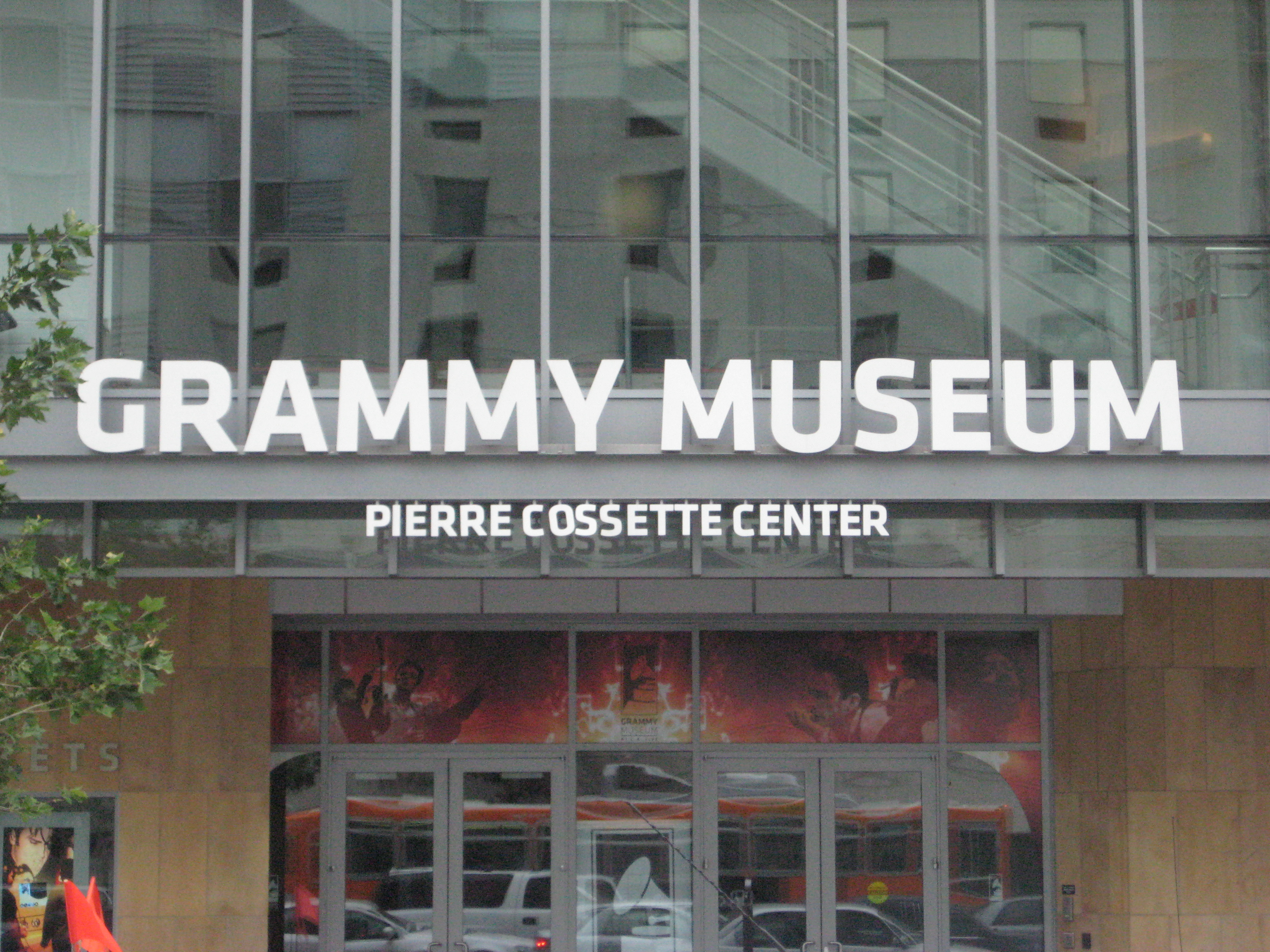

The Grammy Museum is any of a group of museums containing exhibits relating to winners of the Grammy Award for achievement in recording.

The museums in this group include:

- The Grammy Museum at L.A. Live, which opened in 2008 in Los Angeles, California
- The Grammy Museum Mississippi, which opened in 2016 in Cleveland, Mississippi
- The Grammy Museum at Musicians Hall of Fame, Nashville, Tennessee.
- The Grammy Museum Experience, which opened in 2017 at Prudential Center, Newark, New Jersey
