= Ralph Appelbaum Associates =

Museum exhibition design firm

- Type: Private partnership
- Industry: Design and Architecture
- Founded: 1978
- Founder: Ralph Appelbaum
- Headquarters: New York City, U.S.
- Number of locations: New York City, London, Beijing, Berlin, Moscow, and Dubai
- Area served: Worldwide
- Key people: Nick Appelbaum, Partner
- Services: Exhibition and attraction design consultancy
- Number of employees: 150–200
- Website: RAAI.com

Ralph Appelbaum Associates (RAA) is one of the world's longest-established and largest museum exhibition design firms with offices in New York City, London, Beijing, Berlin, Moscow, and Dubai.

== Overview ==
The firm was founded in 1978 by Ralph Appelbaum (born 1942), a graduate of Pratt Institute and former Peace Corps volunteer (in Peru). Appelbaum currently directs RAA's undertakings, and retains daily involvement in selected commissions.

The New York Times reported in 1999 that the firm was composed of "architects, designers, editors, model builders, historians, childhood specialists, one poet, one painter and one astrophysicist."

The company's best-known project is the United States Holocaust Memorial Museum in Washington, D.C., which is the United States' official memorial to the Holocaust. Established in 1993, the museum has been described as a "turning point in museology".

== Major projects ==
RAA has completed 700 commissions in over 40 countries.

=== National museums ===
- Canadian Museum of Human Rights
- The Crown Jewels, The Tower of London
- National Constitution Center, Philadelphia
- National Museum of African American History and Culture, Smithsonian Institution, Washington, DC
- National Museum of Scotland, Edinburgh, Scotland
- National World War I Museum
- United States Holocaust Memorial Museum
- Royal Albert Memorial Museum
- United States Capitol Visitor Center

=== History ===
- The American Immigrant Wall of Honor, Ellis Island
- Culloden Battlefield Memorial Visitor Centre
- The Foundling Museum
- Greyhound Bus Station in Montgomery, Alabama (not executed)
- Indiana State Museum
- The Jewish Museum, Manhattan
- Jewish Museum and Tolerance Center, Moscow, Russia
- Lincoln Castle
- London Transport Museum
- Museum of Tomorrow
- Newseum
- Presidio Officers' Club
- Thomas Edison National Historical Park
- William J. Clinton Presidential Library
- World Music Gallery, The Horniman Museum

=== Cultural ===
- Anchorage Museum
- Bishop Museum
- Ballymena Town Hall
- Heard Museum
- Museum of World Religions
- NASCAR Hall of Fame
- St. Paul's Cathedral
- The Walt Whitman Birthplace State Historic Site & Interpretive Center
- World Golf Hall of Fame

=== Science ===
- American Museum of Natural History, New York City
- Science History Institute
- Moody Gardens
- Natural History Museum of Utah
- Singapore Discovery Centre

=== Temporary exhibitions ===
- Dead Sea Scrolls: Life and Faith in Biblical Times
- Expo 2008: Water: A Unique Resource
- Expo 2010: United Arab Emirates Pavilion
- Mandela Day 2009
- Pompeii the Exhibit: Life and Death in the Shadow of Vesuvius
- TING: Technology and Democracy
- What Price Freedom: New York Public Library Centennial Exhibition

=== Corporate ===
- AT&T
- Carlsberg
- IBM 100: THINK
- IKEA museum
- Intel Museum
- The Walmart Museum

=== Others ===
- Abdullah Gül Presidential Museum and Library
- American Museum of Natural History
- American Indian Cultural Center and Museum
- Expo 2020
- Humboldt Forum
- International African American Museum
- Józef Piłsudski Museum
- Nariman House
- Vietnam Veterans Memorial
- Lift 109 Battersea Powerstation
- World Museum Wien

=== Selected works ===
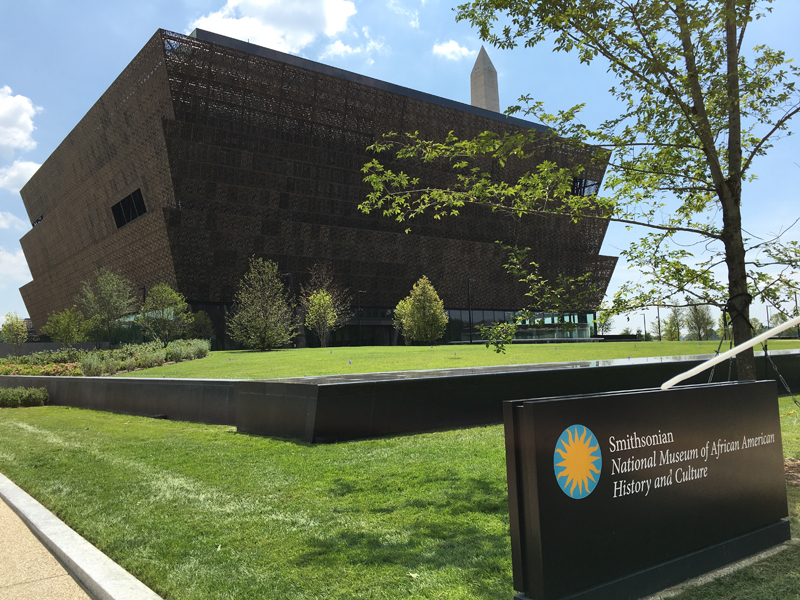
National Museum of African American History and Culture, Washington, D.C.

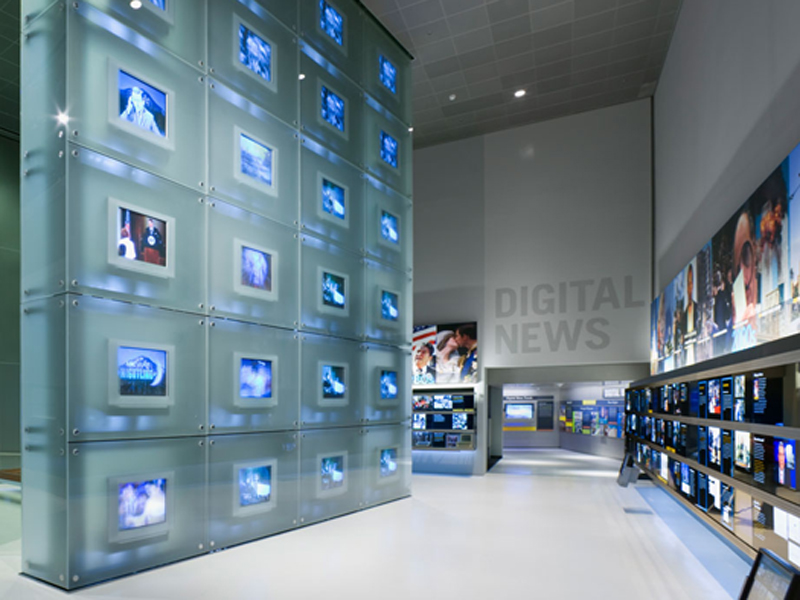
Newseum, Washington D.C.

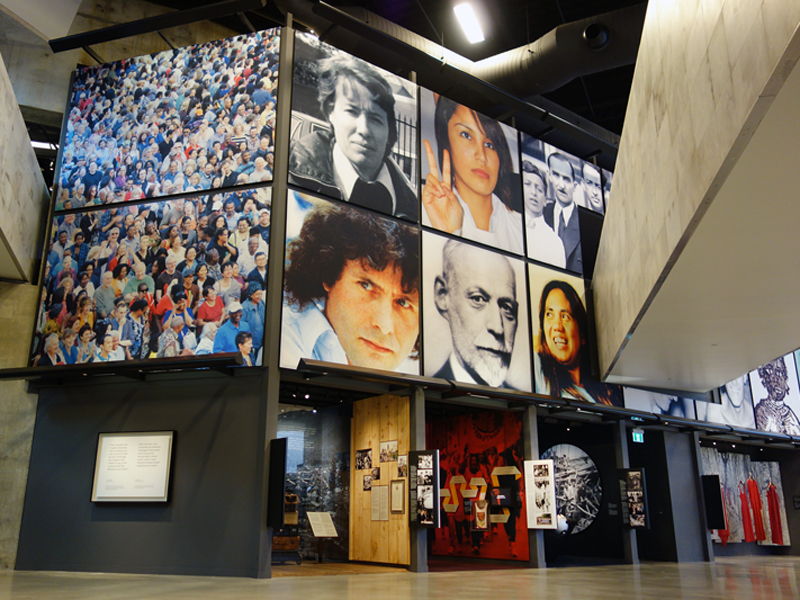
Canadian Museum for Human Rights, Winnipeg, Canada

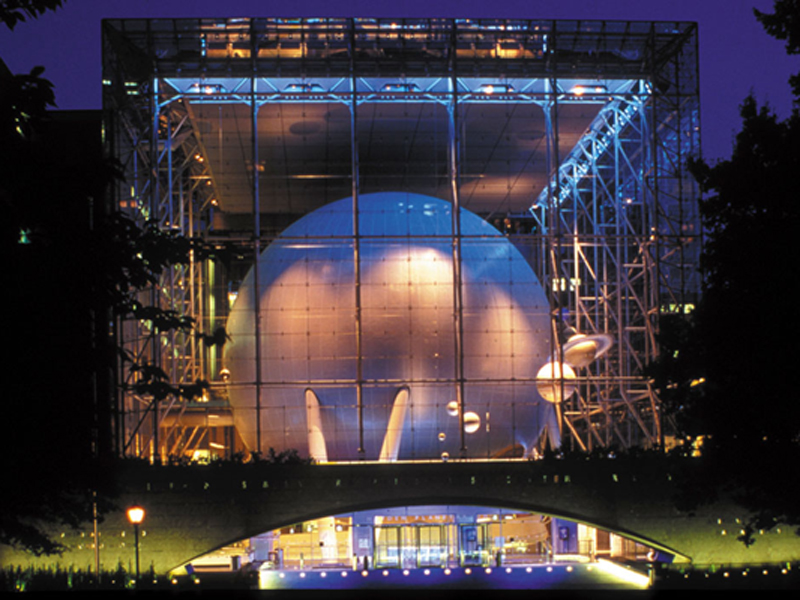
Rose Center for Earth and Space - American Museum of Natural History, New York, New York

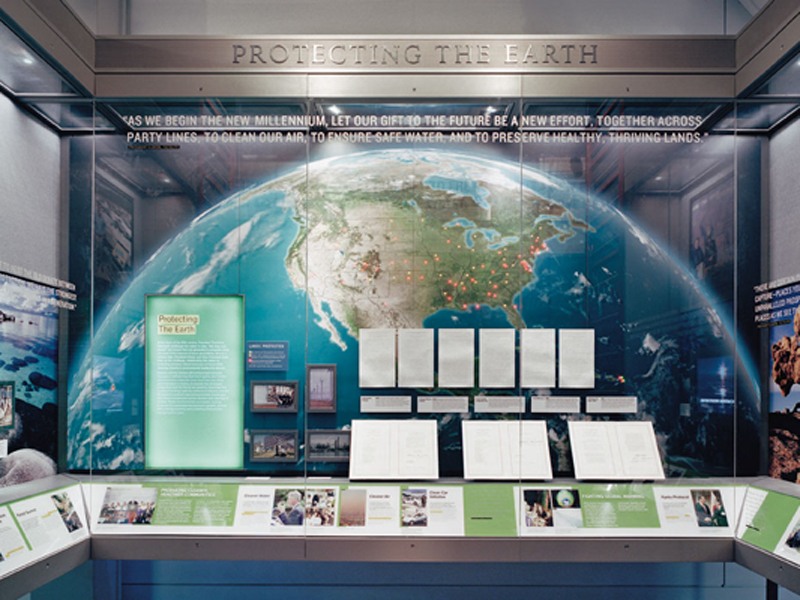
William J. Clinton Presidential Library, Little Rock, Arkansas

== See also ==
- Local Projects, U.S. firm
- Event Communications, U.K. firm
- Gallagher & Associates, U.S. firm
- Xenario, Shanghai/U.S. firm
- Cultural tourism
- Exhibit design
- Exhibition designer
