= Grammy Museum Experience =

Former museum held at the Prudential Center in Newark, New Jersey

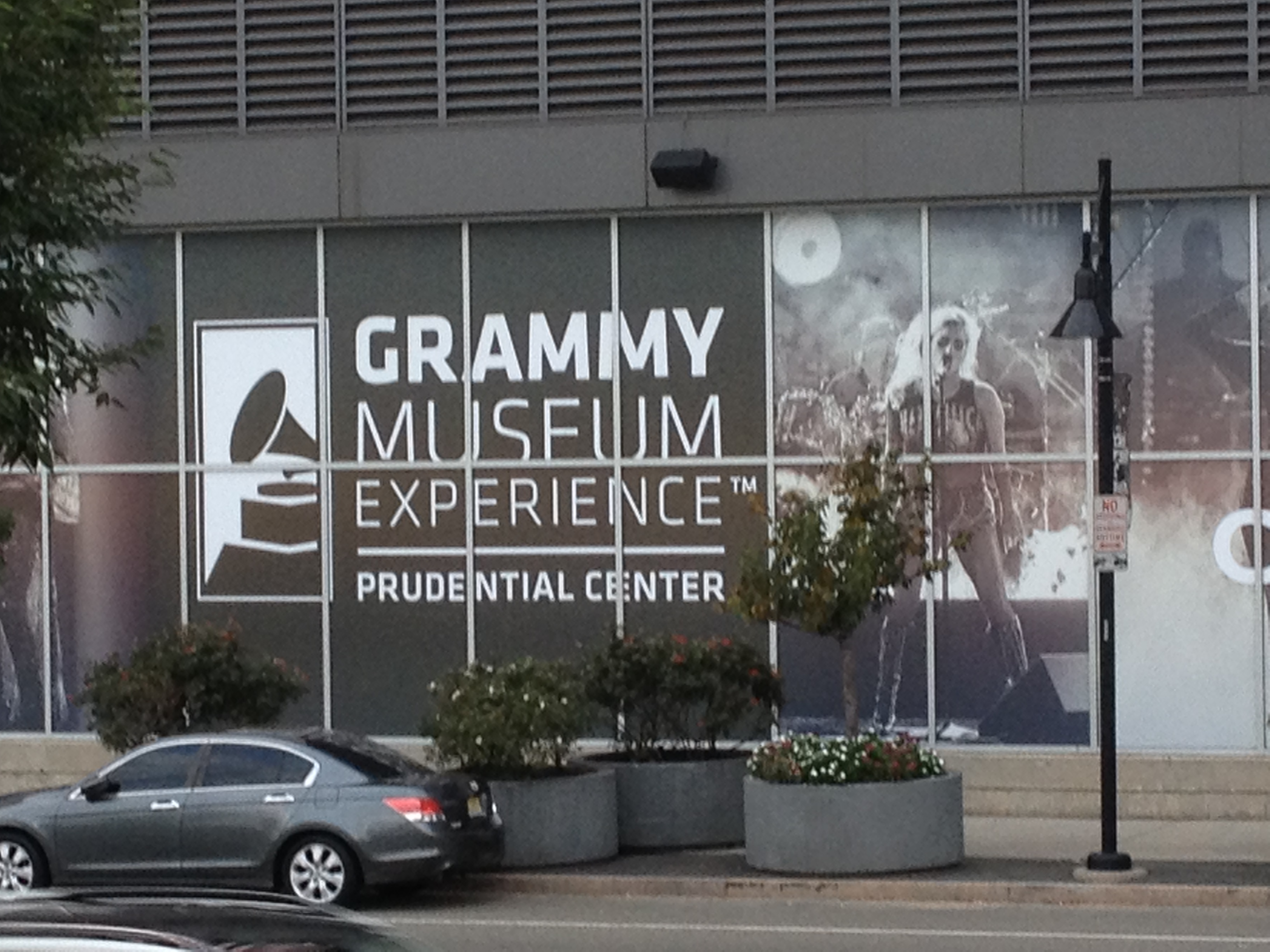

- Location within Essex County, New Jersey Location within New Jersey Location within the United States
- Address: 165 Mulberry Street
- Location: Newark, New Jersey
- Coordinates: 40°44′01″N 74°10′13″W
- Operator: Harris Blitzer Sports & Entertainment (HBSE)

Construction
- Opened: October 20, 2017
- Closed: June 25, 2023

Website
- https://www.grammymuseumexp.org/

The Grammy Museum Experience was an interactive, experiential museum devoted to the history and winners of the Grammy Awards which was located at the Prudential Center in Newark, New Jersey. It was open from October 20, 2017, to June 25, 2023.

It was the first instance of the Grammy Museum in the Northeast. Affiliated museums are the Grammy Museum at L.A. Live in Los Angeles, The Grammy Museum Mississippi, Cleveland, Mississippi and The Grammy Museum at Musicians Hall of Fame, Nashville, Tennessee. The 8,200-square-foot Grammy Museum featured multimedia presentations, public events and educational programming, and highlights some of New Jersey’s most famous music industry stars and homegrown talent.

An exhibition about the Beatles took place in 2022 and 2023 and was included in the North to Shore Festival. The museum closed in 2023 as a result of the Grammy Museum Foundation wishing to have fewer brick-and-mortar locations.
