= Probal Chaudhuri =

Indian statistician

- Born: 1963 (age 62–63); India
- Education: Indian Statistical Institute, University of California, Berkeley
- Awards: Shanti Swarup Bhatnagar Prize for Science and Technology
- Scientific career
- Fields: Statistics
- Workplaces: Indian Statistical Institute, Kolkata
- Doctoral advisor: Charles Joel Stone

Probal Chaudhuri (born 1963) is an Indian statistician. He is a professor of theoretical statistics and mathematics in the Indian Statistical Institute, Kolkata.

Chaudhuri obtained his BStat and MStat degrees from the Indian Statistical Institute, Kolkata, and PhD from University of California, Berkeley. He then joined University of Wisconsin, Madison as an assistant professor in 1988. After two years he returned to India in 1990 and joined the Indian Statistical Institute, Kolkata, as a lecturer. He was promoted to full professorship in 1997. Some of the widely used statistical techniques and concepts that he has invented and developed include: local polynomial nonparametric quantile regression, a geometric notion of quantiles for multivariate data, adaptive transformation and re-transformation technique for the construction of affine invariant distribution-free tests and robust estimates from multivariate data and the scale-space approach in function estimation and smoothing.

He was awarded the Shanti Swarup Bhatnagar Prize for Science and Technology in 2005, the highest science award in India, in the mathematical sciences category.

He was an invited speaker in International Congress of Mathematicians 2010, Hyderabad on the topic of "Probability and Statistics."

== Other awards/honours ==
- BM Birla Science Award (2001)
- C. R. Rao National Award in Statistics (2005)
- Fellow of Indian Academy of Sciences, Bangalore
- Fellow of National Academy of Sciences (India), Allahabad
