= Bernd Girod =

American computer scientist

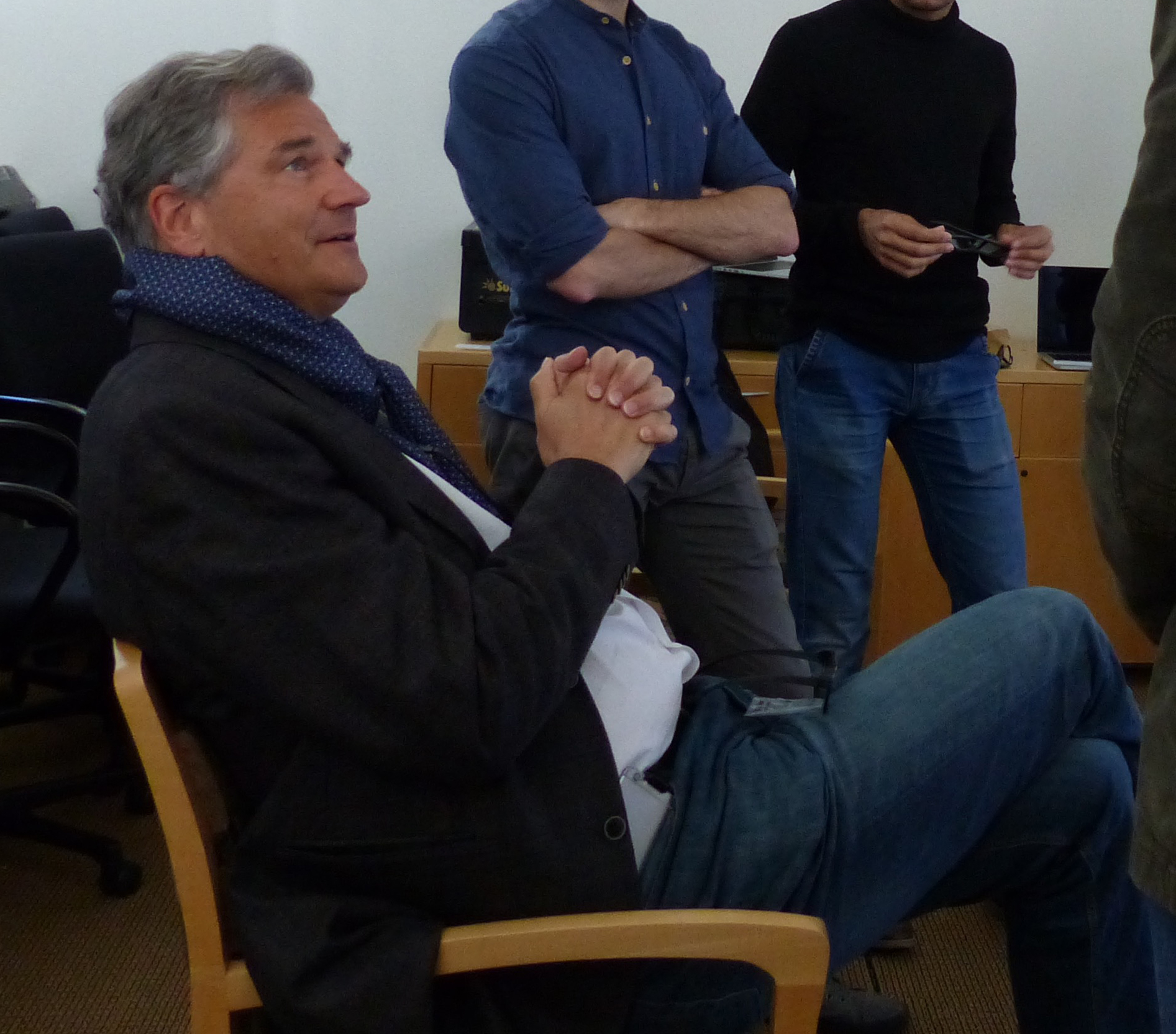
- Education: Georgia Institute of Technology; University of Hannover, Germany
- Known for: Multimedia Systems; Image and Video Coding format; Streaming Media; Visual Search - QBIC; Computer Vision
- Awards: Member of the National Academy of Engineering, Member of the German National Academy of Sciences Leopoldina

Bernd Girod (born December 1, 1957) is a German-American engineer, the Robert L. and Audrey S. Hancock Professor of Electrical Engineering at Stanford University. Girod is a member of the National Academy of Engineering.

== Education and career ==
Girod received his M.S. in electrical engineering from Georgia Institute of Technology (1980) and his Dr.-Ing in electrical engineering from the University of Hannover, Germany (1987).

Prior to Stanford, he was a professor of electrical engineering at the University of Erlangen–Nuremberg and an assistant professor of media technology at the MIT Media Lab.

== Research ==
His research interests are in image and video coding, computer vision, and multimedia systems. In 1998, Bernd Girod was elevated to fellowship of the IEEE for contributions to the theory and practice of video communication.

Girod's research has been central in startup ventures, including Polycom, Vivo Software, 8x8, and RealNetworks. He holds nearly 40 patents.

== Professional activities ==
He is a Faculty Co-Director of the Stanford Center for Image Systems Engineering (SCIEN) and a Director of the Max Planck Center for Visual Computing and Communication. He was Founding Director of David and Helen Gurley Brown Institute for Media Innovations (2012–2015), a Senior Associate Dean for the Online Learning and Professional Development, School of Engineering at Stanford University (2012–2015), and a Senior Associate Dean at large for the School of Engineering at Stanford University (2015–2016).

He is currently an advisor of the Brown Institute for Media Innovation.

=== Selected publications ===
- Girod, Bernd; Chandrasekhar, Vijay (July 2011). "Mobile Visual Search". IEEE Signal Processing Magazine. 28 (4): 61–76. Bibcode:2011ISPM...28...61G. doi:10.1109/msp.2011.940881. S2CID 14744873.
- Girod, Bernd; Aaron, Anne Margot (January 2005). "Distributed Video Coding". Proceedings of the IEEE. 93 (1): 71–83. doi:10.1109/jproc.2004.839619. S2CID 14315331.
- Girod, Bernd; Farber, Niko (October 1999). "Feedback-Based Error Control for Mobile Video Transmission". Proceedings of the IEEE. 87 (10): 1707–1723. doi:10.1109/5.790632.

== Awards and honors ==
- Elected Member of the National Academy of Engineering 2015
- Technical Achievement Award, IEEE Signal Processing Society 2011, “for his contributions to the theory and practice of video communications, search and processing.”
- Elected Member of the German National Academy of Sciences (Leopoldina) 2007
- Fellow, IEEE 1998. His citation reads, “For contributions to the theory and practice of video communication.”
