= Washington Statistical Society =

The Washington Statistical Society (WSS), based in Washington, D.C., is a chapter of the American Statistical Association (ASA). The first American Statistical Association (ASA) meeting in Washington took place on December 31, 1896, for "members living in or near Washington" to hold meetings for scientific discussion. The WSS established its own Constitution in 1926, describing itself as "a branch of the American Statistical Association", and became a chapter of the ASA in 1935.

== Events ==
Since 1991, the Morris Hansen Lecture has been held annually (except 2020 and 2021 due to the COVID-19 pandemic) with a focus on survey theory, applications and policy. The Lecture is typically held in the fall each year and frequently published; abstracts and a few videos reside at the WSS website.

WSS hosts multiple seminars each year, beginning in 1995, with topics across a wide array of statistical interest. Notable presenters include Joseph Adna Hill, W. Edwards Deming, Morris H. Hansen, Margaret E. Martin, Jerome Cornfield, and Samuel W. Greenhouse according to Michael Cohen (statistician).

Short courses have been offered intermittently since 2016, sometimes across multiple days. Topics include Multiple Imputation Analysis, Small Area Estimation, Statistical Leadership, Practical Bayesian Computation, and Communicating Data Clearly.

== Awards ==
The WSS also gives awards, such as the Curtis Jacobs Memorial Award, which was created in 1991 to honor the memory of Curtis Jacobs, a former Bureau of Labor Statistics statistician.
