= Giorgia Lupi =

Italian information designer (born 1981)

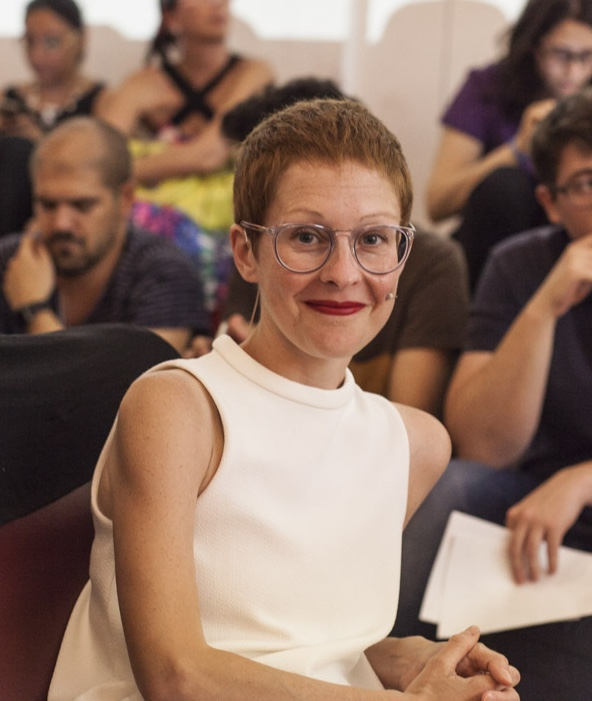
- Lupi at BASE Milano, 2017
- Born: 1981 (age 44–45)
- Occupations: Partner, Pentagram (2019-present)
- Known for: Information designer

Giorgia Lupi (born 1981) is an Italian information designer, a partner at design firm Pentagram, and co-founder of research and design firm Accurat. She is the recipient of 2022 Cooper-Hewitt American National Design Award for her innovative work in information design and author of multiple books, including Dear Data, a collection of hand drawn data visualizations co-authored with Stefanie Posavec. Lupi's work is a part of the permanent collection at the Museum of Modern Art.

== Early life and education ==
Lupi was born in 1981 in Finale Emilia outside of Modena, Italy. When she was a little girl she would spend a significant amount of time collecting and organizing all kinds of items into folders: colored sheets of papers, tiny stones, pieces of textiles from her grandmothers buttons, sales receipts and so much more grew in her collection. She has said she took pleasure in organizing and categorizing her treasures based on their sizes, colour, and dimensions. She has said that her childhood interest in numbers, cataloguing and classifying rules and systems explains the origin of her work and her desire to play with data. These interests have also included the scales of large cities and urban mapping projects, and representing information layers underlining an architecture project.

She graduated from University of Ferrara in Ferrara, Italy, where she studied architecture. She stated she was not sure of a right career path at the time of entering college, and applying to study architecture was her “way of not choosing.” She graduated in 2006 with a master's degree in architecture, but has not built any houses during her schooling career. In Lupi’s view, architect's job is not to build buildings, but design representations of buildings, images of building's following a system of symbols that convey information about how to manufacture them.

After graduating, she worked with two different interaction design firms in Italy, mostly on interactive installations and mapping projects showing off difficult systems of knowledge. In 2011 she began her PhD in design at Milan Politecnico and started Accurat. In 2012 she moved to New York City, where she is still based as of 2025.

== Career ==
=== Accurat ===
In 2011, Lupi co-founded research and design firm Accurat, which combines design and data to create data visualizations, interfaces, and tools. Among their clients are Google, IBM, Bill & Melinda Gates Foundation, Starbucks, United Nations, the World Economic Forum and the Museum of Modern Art.

Lupi's influences for her work come from fascinations by geometrical feel and balance of abstract art compositions. Lupi's work has been influenced by data visualization and data art by Moritz Stefaner, Aaron Koblin and Jer Thorp. What drives Lupi in her career is the overlapping space between intuition and analysis, between beauty and logic, numbers and images.

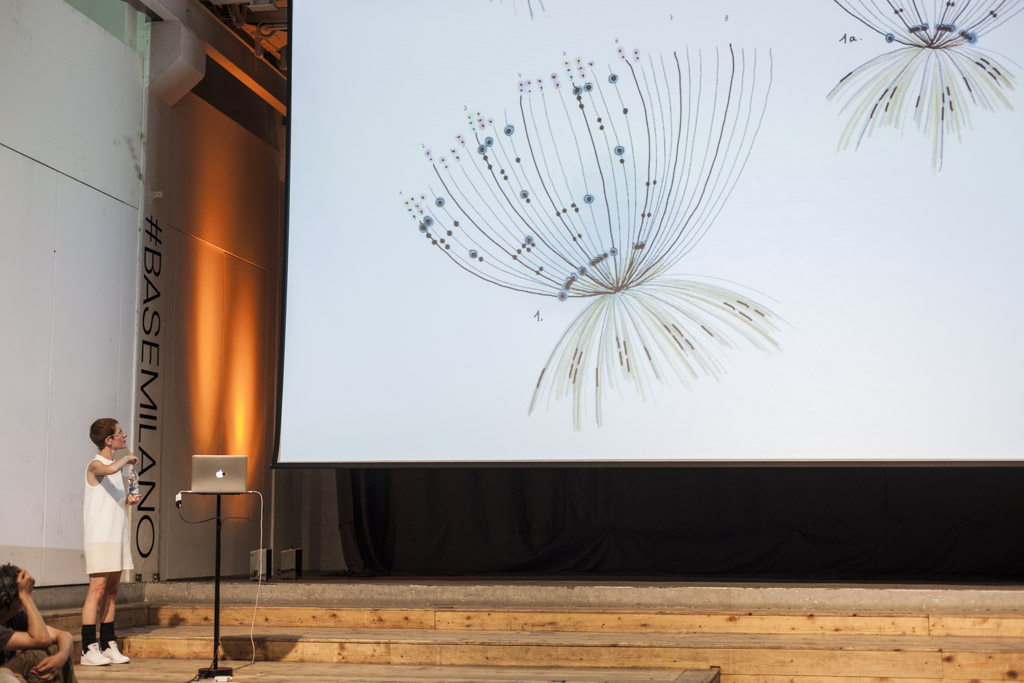
Giorgia Lupi at a 2017 Meet The Media Guru talk, in front of one of her images.

=== Dear Data ===
In 2014, Lupi began the Dear Data Project with Stefanie Posavec. Every week for one year, Lupi and Posavec exchanged a "data drawing", a hand-drawn data visualization that represented a part of their daily life, through the mail. In 2016, these postcards were compiled and published in a book called Dear Data. The following year, the Museum of Modern Art added the original Dear Data postcards to the Museum's collection.

=== Data humanism ===
In 2016, Lupi published an article in Print in which she introduced the concept of "data humanism", which she further developed in her 2017 TED Talk, the recording of which has been viewed over 1.4 million times as of 2025. Lupi gave multiple talks and interviews on the subject since then and is widely acclaimed as the pioneer and popularizer of the "data humanism" philosophy.

=== Pentagram ===
In 2019, Lupi left Accurat and joined the New York office of design firm Pentagram as a partner.

== Long Covid ==
In December 2023, she published her experience with Long Covid as a visual story in The New York Times.

== Awards ==
- 2022: National Design Award by Cooper Hewitt, Smithsonian Design Museum
- 2015: Information is Beautiful Awards - Gold Medal and Most Beautiful Project.
- 2013: Information is Beautiful Awards - Gold Medal, category: Data Visualization.
- 2013: Strata Conference - Data Journalism Award.
- 2013: Cannes Festival - Bronze Lion, Direct Advertising.
