= Dear Data =

Collection of Postcards

- First edition
- Author: Stefanie Posavec, Giorgia Lupi
- Language: English
- Subject: Information design
- ISBN: 978-1-84614-906-1 (Flexibound)

Dear Data is a collection of postcards containing data recorded from the everyday lives of information designers Stefanie Posavec and Giorgia Lupi. The book was published in the United Kingdom by Penguin Press on September 1, 2016 and in North America by Princeton Architectural Press on September 6, 2016.

Prior to this year-long collaboration, the co-authors had only met twice. The premise of this project was to test firsthand how well one could get to know someone through reading their data. Postcards were exchanged between them on a weekly basis with the data being represented through a drawing on one side and a detailed key or legend on the other. A few of the topics include: A Week of Negative Thoughts, A Week of A Workspace, and A Week of New Things. The project has surface similarities with the quantified self projects like designer Nicholas Felton's annual reports that quantify and represent life events like number of books read or place visited, but is more personal and less analytical, with hand-drawn illustrations replacing computer generated charts. It "paints a human portrait with data." Dear data is also, in a way, the opposite of Big Data, it is composed of representations little data about on the minutiae of individuals' lives.

The original post cards as well as several accompanying notebooks are now part of the permanent collection at the MoMA.

== Reception ==
Dear Data won two 2015 Information is Beautiful Awards, the Most Beautiful Award as well as Gold in the Dataviz Project category. It was also a finalist for the Innovation By Design Awards 2016 and nominated for the Design Museum Beazley Designs of the Year 2016. While the book was not widely reviewed, reviewers were generally positive. Wired called the book "charming", saying it is "filled with hand drawn postcards and full-page spreads with insights about how it feels to keep a microscope on your life for an entire year."
