= Alfred Wertheimer =

American photographer (1929–2014)

- Born: November 16, 1929; Coburg, Bavaria, Germany
- Died: October 19, 2014 (aged 84); New York City, U.S.
- Occupation: Photographer

Alfred Wertheimer (November 16, 1929 – October 19, 2014) was an American photographer. He is best remembered for his 1950s portraits of Elvis Presley, which have been exhibited at the National Portrait Gallery, London and the Rock and Roll Hall of Fame.

== Career ==
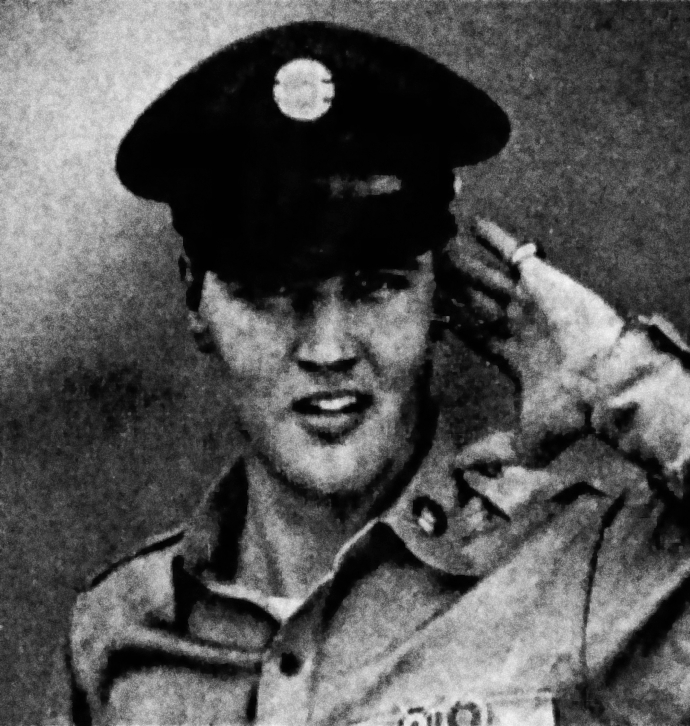
Elvis Presley photographed by Wertheimer at the Brooklyn Army Base, September 1958

Wertheimer was born in Weimar Germany but moved, with his family, to the United States in 1936 to escape Nazi rule. The family settled in Brooklyn, New York City where Wertheimer attended Haaren High School. He studied drawing at Cooper Union's School of Art, earning a degree in advertising design. Wertheimer developed his abilities as a photographer at this time, taking shots for the school's newspaper with a camera given to him by his older brother. When he was drafted into the U.S. Army in 1952, he photographed his training experience at Fort Dix, New Jersey. After honorable discharge, Wertheimer returned to New York and worked under the fashion photographer Tom Palumbo for a year. Upon becoming a freelancer, he began taking on jobs from RCA Victor's publicity department, photographing recording artists Perry Como and Julius La Rosa.

In March 1956, RCA publicist Anne Fulchino contracted Wertheimer to photograph Elvis Presley's fourth appearance on the Tommy and Jimmy Dorsey variety series Stage Show. Wertheimer had never heard of Presley before but he admired the singer's confidence in front of the camera, considering him "the perfect subject". He captured Presley's routine activities including shaving and styling his hair and made use of available light. When Presley returned to New York a few months later, Wertheimer was again engaged to photograph him, capturing a June 30 concert in Richmond, California, a July 1 appearance singing "Hound Dog" on The Steve Allen Show and the July 2 recording session for "Hound Dog" and "Don't Be Cruel". One of Wertheimer's most famous photographs was taken backstage on June 30; entitled The Kiss, it shows Presley embracing a blonde fan, later identified as Barbara Gray. After the assignment was officially complete, Wertheimer followed Presley to Memphis, Tennessee to photograph him with his family. He photographed Presley one last time in September 1958 when the singer was inducted into the U.S. Army. In 2010, Wertheimer told Smithsonian "all the images that I took are really of the authentic Elvis, who was directing his own life."

Wertheimer later photographed other musical performers including Lena Horne and Nina Simone. He moved into photojournalism and documentary in the 1960s. He covered John F. Kennedy's 1960 presidential campaign and was one of the five main cameramen on Woodstock in 1969. He began receiving inquiries about his Presley photos from publications including Newsweek and Rolling Stone immediately following the singer's death in 1977. Wertheimer struck a deal with Time, which paid him $3,000 for the exclusive rights to his Elvis work but ran just one picture, of Elvis singing to the dog on The Steve Allen Show. After retrieving the 3,800 negatives from his basement in New York, Wertheimer assembled Elvis '56, a paperback photobook published by Collier Books in 1979. The book was praised by Robert Hilburn of the Los Angeles Times, who commented "Presley fans should embrace Elvis '56 the same way they cling to The Sun Sessions". In 2013, Taschen published Elvis and the Birth of Rock and Roll, a further book of Wertheimer's Presley photographs.

Wertheimer's Presley photographs are widely distributed, having been licensed by Elvis Presley Enterprises. In 1983, The Kiss was used on the poster for Sam Shepard's play Fool for Love. Wertheimer's shot of Presley sitting at a piano in an empty room, preparing to rehearse for The Steve Allen Show, was used on the cover of Peter Guralnick's biography Last Train to Memphis: The Rise of Elvis Presley (1994). In 2017, Quarto published a photobook collaboration between Wertheimer and Guralnick, Elvis: A King in the Making.

In 1995, Wertheimer's work came to the attention of George Murray, director of the Govinda Gallery in Georgetown, Washington, D.C.. Murray believed the photographs to be "the most important and compelling images ever taken" of Presley. The photographs were the focus of a series of small exhibitions at the Govinda; they were also part of the Rock and Roll Hall of Fame's Elvis is in the Building exhibition, which ran from 1998 to 1999. In 2010, the Smithsonian Institution sponsored an exhibition made up entirely of Wertheimer's photographs, Elvis at 21. The collection toured venues including the Grammy Museum at L.A. Live and the National Portrait Gallery, London until 2016.

Wertheimer died aged 84 on October 19, 2014. Paying tribute, Priscilla Presley told the Associated Press: "There has been no other photographer that Elvis ever allowed to get as up close and personal in his life through photos as he did with Alfred".
