= Charles Joel Stone =

American statistician (1936–2019)

- Born: July 13, 1936; Los Angeles, California, U.S.
- Died: April 16, 2019 (aged 82)
- Education: California Institute of Technology (B.S.); Stanford University (PhD)
- Spouse: Barbara L. Cohn (m. 1966)
- Children: 2
- Scientific career
- Workplaces: Cornell University; UCLA; University of California, Berkeley
- Thesis: Limit Theorems for Birth and Death Processes and Diffusion Processes
- Doctoral advisor: Samuel Karlin
- Doctoral students: Probal Chaudhuri; Mark Henry Hansen; Michael Cohen (statistician)

Charles "Chuck" Joel Stone (July 13, 1936 – April 16, 2019) was an American statistician and mathematician.

== Early life ==
Charles Joel Stone was born and raised in Los Angeles. After secondary school at North Hollywood High School, Stone graduated with a Bachelor of Science in science from the California Institute of Technology in 1958. He then matriculated at Stanford University, where in 1961 he received his PhD in statistics. His PhD thesis Limit Theorems for Birth and Death Processes and Diffusion Processes was supervised by Samuel Karlin.

== Career ==
From 1962 to 1964 Stone was an assistant professor in the mathematics department of Cornell University. From 1964 1981 to he was a faculty member of the mathematics department of UCLA (University of California, Los Angeles), where he worked extensively with Leo Breiman (who moved to Berkeley in 1980) and Sidney Charles Port (born 1935). In the statistics department of the University of California, Berkeley, Stone was from 1981 a full professor, a position which he held until his retirement as professor emeritus.

When they were professors at UCLA, Stone and Breiman consulted for Technology Services Corporation in Santa Monica. Based on their work, they co-authored a 1978 technical report, Parsimonious Binary Classification Trees, Elaborating on the report, in 1984 they published, with two more co-authors, Jerome H. Friedman and Richard Allen Oshlen (born 1942), a greatly expended version entitled Classification and Regression Trees.

In addition to research on statistical algorithms, Stone did research on potential theory, "local limit theorems, weak convergence of stochastic processes, and renewal theory."

Stone was a Guggenheim Fellow for the academic year 1980–1981. In 1986 he was an invited speaker at the International Congress of Mathematicians in Berkeley, California. He was elected a Fellow of the Institute of Mathematical Statistics in 1970 and a Fellow of the Class of 2013 (announced in 2012) of the American Mathematical Society. He was elected a Member of the National Academy of Sciences in 1993.

== Personal life ==
In June 1966 he married Barbara L. Cohn in Los Angeles. They had two sons.

== Death ==
Stone died on April 16, 2019.

== Selected publications ==
=== Articles ===
- Stone, Charles (1963). "Weak convergence of stochastic processes defined on semi-infinite time intervals". Proceedings of the American Mathematical Society. 14 (5): 694–696. doi:10.1090/S0002-9939-1963-0153046-2. ISSN 0002-9939.
- Stone, Charles (1967). "On local and ratio limit theorems". Lucien M. Le Cam; Jerzy Neyman, eds., Proceedings of the Fifth Berkeley Symposium on Mathematical Statistics and Probability, Volume 2: Contributions to Probability Theory, Part 2. University of California Press. pp. 217–224.
- Port, Sidney C.; Stone, Charles J. (1969). "Potential theory of random walks on Abelian groups". Acta Mathematica. 122: 19–114. doi:10.1007/BF02392007. ISSN 0001-5962.
- Port, Sidney C.; Stone, Charles J. (1971). "Infinitely divisible processes and their potential theory. II". Annales de l'Institut Fourier. 21 (4): 179–265. doi:10.5802/aif.398. ISSN 0373-0956.
- Stone, Charles J. (1975). "Adaptive Maximum Likelihood Estimators of a Location Parameter". The Annals of Statistics. 3 (2): 267–284. doi:10.1214/aos/1176343056. JSTOR 2958945.
- Stone, Charles J. (1982). "Optimal Global Rates of Convergence for Nonparametric Regression". The Annals of Statistics. 10 (4): 1040–1053. doi:10.1214/aos/1176345969. JSTOR 2240707.
- Stone, Charles J. (1990). "Large-Sample Inference for Log-Spline Models". The Annals of Statistics. 18 (2): 717–741. doi:10.1214/aos/1176347622. JSTOR 2242130.
- Truong, Young K.; Stone, Charles J. (1992). "Nonparametric Function Estimation Involving Time Series". The Annals of Statistics. 20 (1): 77–97. doi:10.1214/aos/1176348513. JSTOR 2242151.
- Kooperberg, Charles; Stone, Charles J.; Truong, Young K. (1995). "Hazard Regression". Journal of the American Statistical Association. 90 (429): 78–94. doi:10.1080/01621459.1995.10476491.
- Stone, Charles J.; Hansen, Mark H.; Kooperberg, Charles; Truong, Young K. (1997). "Polynomial splines and their tensor products in extended linear modeling: 1994 Wald memorial lecture". The Annals of Statistics. 25 (4). doi:10.1214/aos/1031594728.
- Stone, Charles J. (2005). "Nonparametric M-regression with free knot splines". Journal of Statistical Planning and Inference. 130 (1–2): 183–206. doi:10.1016/j.jspi.2003.05.002. ISSN 0378-3758.

=== Books ===
- Hoel, P.; Port, S. C.; Stone, C. J. (1971). Introduction to Probability Theory. Houghton Mifflin. (textbook)
- Hoel, P.; Port, S. C.; Stone, C. J. (1971). Introduction to Statistics. Houghton Mifflin. (textbook)
- Hoel, Paul G.; Port, Sidney C.; Stone, Charles J. (December 1986). Introduction to Stochastic Processes. Waveland Press. ISBN 9781478608998. 1st edition. Houghton Mifflin. 1971. (textbook)
- Port, Sidney C.; Stone, Charles J. (December 2, 2012). Brownian Motion and Classical Potential Theory. Elsevier. ISBN 9780323159081. 1st edition. 1978.
- Breiman, Leo; Friedman, Jerome H.; Olshen, Richard A.; Stone, Charles J. (1984). Classification And Regression Trees (1st ed.).
  - Breiman, Leo; Friedman, Jerome H.; Olshen, Richard A.; Stone, Charles J. (2017). ebook. Boca Raton: Routledge. doi:10.1201/9781315139470. ISBN 9781315139470. S2CID 129307201; 368 pages; abstract & table of contents
- Stone, Charles J. (1996). A Course in Probability and Statistics. Duxbury Press. ISBN 9780534233280.
