= Brown Institute for Media Innovation =

US journalism research center

- Other names: The David and Helen Gurley Brown Institute for Media Innovation
- Type: Joint research program
- Established: 2012
- Parent institution: Stanford University School of Engineering
- Director: Maneesh Agrawala and Mark Hansen; Bernd Girod (2012–2015)
- Language: English

The Brown Institute for Media Innovation is a research institute that funds projects at the intersection of journalism and technology. It is a joint initiative between the Stanford University School of Engineering and the Columbia University Graduate School of Journalism. The Brown Institute funds research through awarding annual "Magic Grants" to projects which develop applications that create technologies that foster journalistic pursuit, and through direct support to several Brown Fellows at both institutions. The official name of the program is The David and Helen Gurley Brown Institute for Media Innovation, although it is commonly referred to as the Brown Institute.

== History ==
The institute was created in 2012 following a $30 million endowment made to Stanford University and Columbia Universities by Helen Gurley Brown. Gurley Brown, an author, publisher, and businesswoman, who served as editor-in-chief of Cosmopolitan magazine for over three decades, partially endowed the institute in memory of her husband, David Brown, who produced the films Jaws, The Sting, and The Verdict, among others, and attended both Stanford and Columbia. Speaking of the institute's purpose, Gurley Brown stated, "David and I have long supported and encouraged bright young people to follow their passions and to create original content. Great content needs useable technology. Sharing a language is where the magic happens. It's time for two great American institutions on the East and West Coasts to build a bridge.” The Brown Institute's directors are Maneesh Agrawala and Mark Henry Hansen. The advisory board consists of Frank A. Bennack Jr., Chief Executive Officer, Hearst Corporation; Eve Burton, Senior Vice President & General Counsel, Hearst Corporation; William Campbell, Chairman of the Board, Intuit, Inc.; Mary Meeker, General Partner, Kleiner, Perkins, Caufield & Byers; and filmmaker Steven Spielberg.
