= Listening Post (artwork) =

Artwork

Listening Post is an artwork that visualizes Internet chatroom conversations. The work was created between 2002 and 2005 as a collaboration between the artist Ben Rubin and the statistician Mark Hansen. It is also often discussed as a work of electronic literature due to its literary qualities.

Listening Post uses custom computer programs to automatically collect thousands of chatroom and bulletin board conversations. The conversations are then parsed by the software into smaller phrases that are displayed on a hanging grid of 231 vacuum fluorescent text displays. The displays are hung in a grid format 12 feet high and 21 feet wide, suspended in 11 rows and 21 columns. A text-to speech synthesizer voices some of the phrases as part of the accompanying soundtrack. Writer Adam Gopnik described its soundtrack as "intoning words and sentences one by one in a sepulchral BBC announcer's voice or chanting and singing them in fugue-like overlay".

Listening Post has been exhibited at the Whitney Museum of American Art, the San Jose Museum of Art, the Brooklyn Academy of Music and the Yerba Buena Center for the Arts.

The work is included in the collections of the San Jose Museum of Art and the Science Museum Group collection in the United Kingdom.
