= Ben Rubin (artist) =

American media artist (born 1964)

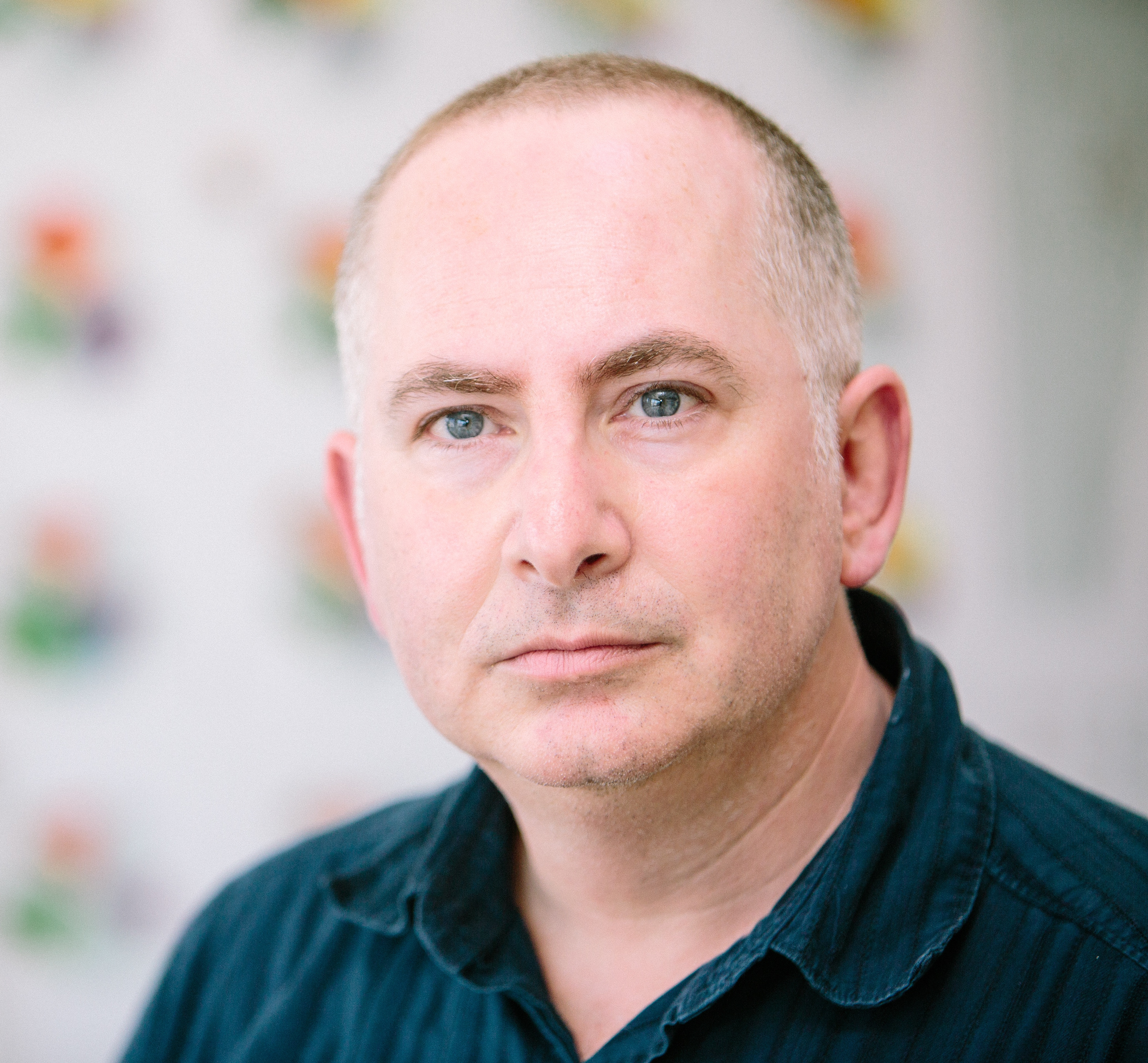
- Rubin

Background information
- Born: Benjamin Rubin; Boston, Massachusetts, U.S.
- Genres: Media Art, Data Art, Sound Design
- Occupations: Media Artist, Designer
- Years active: 1993–present

Ben Rubin (born 1964) is a media artist and designer based in New York City. He is best known for his data-driven media installations and public artworks, including Listening Post and Moveable Type, both created in collaboration with statistician and journalism professor Mark Hansen. Since 2015, Rubin has served as the director of the Center for Data Arts at The New School, where he is an associate professor of design.

== Life and education ==
Rubin was born in Boston, Massachusetts in 1964. He graduated from Brown University in 1987 with an AB degree in Computer Science and Semiotics. He went on to attend the Massachusetts Institute of Technology where he studied with Ricky Leacock and Glorianna Davenport, earning an MS in Visual Studies at the MIT Media Lab in 1989. Rubin moved to New York in 1993. In 1998, he founded Electronic Arts Research (EAR), a multimedia art and design studio. He co-founded The Office for Creative Research in 2013, along with data artist Jer Thorp and, statistician Mark Hansen. Rubin joined the faculty of The New School in 2015, becoming the director of the Center for Data Arts.

== Art career ==
Rubin's work uses computational methods, including Natural Language Processing and Machine Learning, to engage with cultural source material (art collections, literary works, public documents, news, and social media). His work takes a variety of forms, including sculpture, projections, sound installations, immersive environments, and live performance.

His works have been exhibited at Whitney Museum of American Art, Reina Sofia Museum in Madrid, Art Institute of Chicago, Fondation Cartier in Paris, Aarhus Art Museum in Denmark, MIT List Visual Arts Center, Vancouver Art Gallery, Skirball Center in Los Angeles (in a show organized by the Getty Museum), Brooklyn Academy of Music and San Jose Museum of Art.

In addition to his own work, Rubin has collaborated with a wide range of people, including musicians and composers (Arto Lindsey, Steve Reich, Laurie Anderson, George Lewis, Richard Teitlebaum, Zeena Parkins), architects (Diller+Scofidio / Renfro, James Polshek, Rafael Pelli, Renzo Piano, SOM), artists (Anne Hamilton, Lorna Simpson), and philosophers (Bruno Latour, Paul Virilio). Many of Rubin's most important works were created in the course of his longtime collaboration with statistician Mark Hansen.

Rubin has been resident artist at the Steim Foundation Amsterdam, Banff Centre For The Arts Alberta, On the Boards Seattle, and Brooklyn Academy of Music and Bell Laboratories. In 2014, The Office of Creative Research was part of MoMA's Artists Experiment initiative.

== Public art ==
Rubin's commissioned work is permanently installed at the New York Times building and the Public Theater in New York, as well as at the headquarters of Adobe Systems in San Jose, California, and Brookfield Place, Calgary.

- Jump Cuts, United Artists Multiplex, San Jose (with Diller+Scofidio) 1996
- Video Beam, Brasserie Restaurant, New York (with Diller+Scofidio) 2000
- Blur, Swiss Expo ’02, Yverdon, Switzerland (with Diller+Scofidio) 2002
- Four Stories, New Central Public Library, Minneapolis 2006
- San Jose Semaphore, Adobe Systems, San Jose 2006
- Can You Not Tell Water from Air, Morimoto Sushi Bar, Boca Raton FL 2008
- Teardrop Park, Battery Park City (with Ann Hamilton and Michael Mercil) 2009
- Beacon, Museum of American Jewish History, Philadelphia 2010
- Shakespeare Machine, The Public Theater 2012

His public art installation And That’s The Way It Is (2012) at the University of Texas campus in Austin, a text based video inspired by broadcast television news from Walter Cronkite's newscasts and other contemporary news feeds won the CoD+A Award in 2013.

== Teaching ==
Between 1997 and 2002, Rubin taught at New York University's Interactive Telecommunications Program. In 2004, he joined as Critic in Yale School of Art's MFA in Graphic Design program where he remained until 2006.

== Performance ==
In 1988, while still in graduate school at MIT, Rubin was hired as a consultant by Beryl Korot and music composer Steve Reich to develop technology for their multimedia opera, The Cave, which premiered in Vienna in 1993. In 1994, Rubin began the first of several collaborations with Laurie Anderson, creating software and technical solutions for her performance tours, including Nerve Bible (1994), Songs and Stories from Moby Dick (1999), Dal Vivo (1998), and numerous installation projects.

Rubin was a founding member of The Builders Association theater company.

Starting in 2007, Rubin began an ongoing series of collaborations with the New York-based theater ensemble Elevator Repair Service (ERS), developing a performance installation called Shuffle (2009–2014) that remixed text from three 1920s American novels. In 2013, Rubin won an Obie Award for his projection design for Elevator Repair Service's Arguendo, a theatrical piece based on U.S. Supreme Court oral arguments that debuted at the Public Theater in New York.

== Exhibitions ==
=== Solo exhibitions ===
- Not Dreaming in Public, Whitney Museum of American Art (with Leni Schwendinger) 1995
- Listening Post, Next Wave Festival, Brooklyn Academy of Music (with Mark Hansen) 2001
- Listening Post, Whitney Museum of American Art (with Mark Hansen) 2002
- A Ticking Sound, Bryce Wolkowitz Gallery, New York 2006
- Listening Post, Art Collection of the Science Museum, London (with Mark Hansen) 2008
- Vectors, Bryce Wolkowitz Gallery, New York 2011

=== Group exhibitions ===
- Grand Hotel, Vancouver Art Gallery, Vancouver 2013
- GLOBALE: Infosphere, ZKM, Karlsruhe, Germany 2016

== Awards ==
- Wired Rave Award nomination for Listening Post (with Mark Hansen) 2003
- Webby Award, NetArt category, for Listening Post (with Mark Hansen) 2003
- Third Coast International Audio Festival Documentary Award for Open Outcry 2003
- Prix Ars Electronica, Golden Nica Award for Listening Post (with Mark Hansen) 2004
- Public Art Dialog PAD Award for achievement in the field of public art 2012
- CoD+A Awards top 100 projects, Public Spaces Category for Shakespeare Machine 2013
- Public Art Network year-in-review, selection for And That’s the Way it Is 2013
- NYC Public Design Commission Excellence in Design Award for Shakespeare Machine 2013
- CoD+A Award Winner, Public Spaces category for And That’s the Way it Is 2013
- Drama Desk nomination for Projection Design for Arguendo 2014
- Obie Award for Projection Design for Arguendo 2014
