= Michael Cohen (statistician) =

American mathematical statistician (born 1947)

Michael Paul Cohen
- Born: July 1947 (age 79); San Mateo, California, U.S.
- Education: University of California, San Diego (B.A. with honors); University of California, Los Angeles (Ph.D.)
- Known for: Survey methodology, Consumer Price Index research, mathematical statistics, education statistics, transportation statistics, formal epistemology
- Awards: Fellow of the American Association for the Advancement of Science Fellow of the American Educational Research Association; Fellow of the American Statistical Association Fellow of the Royal Statistical Society
- Scientific career
- Fields: Statistics, Survey methodology
- Workplaces: Bureau of Labor Statistics National Center for Education Statistics; Bureau of Transportation Statistics; Statistical Consulting LLC American Institutes for Research
- Thesis: Fisher Information and Estimators of Location-Scale Parameters
- Doctoral advisor: Charles Joel Stone

Michael Paul Cohen (born July 1947) is an American mathematical statistician known for his contributions to survey methodology, education statistics, and the design of large-scale federal surveys. Cohen is a Principal Statistician at the American Institutes for Research (AIR). He has held research and leadership positions at the Bureau of Labor Statistics, the National Center for Education Statistics, the Bureau of Transportation Statistics, Statistical Consulting LLC, and AIR. His research has addressed topics including the Consumer Price Index, multilevel survey design, Bayesian methods for unequal probability sampling, and applications of statistical methodology in education and transportation. Cohen is a Fellow of the American Association for the Advancement of Science, the American Educational Research Association, the American Statistical Association, the Royal Statistical Society, and the Washington Academy of Sciences, and an elected member of the International Statistical Institute and Sigma Xi.

== Education ==
Cohen earned his Bachelor of Arts degree in mathematics with honors from the University of California, San Diego. He went on to complete his Ph.D. in mathematics with specialty in mathematical statistics at the University of California, Los Angeles, where his doctoral advisor was Charles Joel Stone. His dissertation was titled Fisher Information and Estimators of Location-Scale Parameters.

== Career ==
After completing his doctorate, Cohen joined the Bureau of Labor Statistics (1979–1987), where he contributed to survey methodology and research on the Consumer Price Index (CPI) and the Consumer Expenditure Surveys (Interview and Diary). With John P. Sommers, he developed methods for estimating cost weights in the CPI that were implemented in the 1987 CPI Revision.

At the National Center for Education Statistics, Cohen did foundational work on the newly established Integrated Postsecondary Education Data System (IPEDS) and later joined the Statistical Methodology Group that was responsible ensuring the soundness of NCES publications and data products.

At the Bureau of Transportation Statistics (BTS), he was lead mathematical statistician for the U.S. Commodity Flow Survey (2000–2002) and later served as the BTS Assistant Director for Survey Programs (2002–2006) overseeing BTS statistical surveys.

== Awards and honors ==
Cohen is a Fellow of the American Association for the Advancement of Science, the American Educational Research Association, the American Statistical Association (ASA), the Royal Statistical Society, and the Washington Academy of Sciences. His ASA Fellow award was for "technical contributions to a wide range of topics in survey research; for technical leadership within government organizations; and for outstanding service to the profession."

In addition, Cohen was honored with the American Statistical Association Outstanding Service Award in 2010 and the Washington Statistical Society (WSS) President's Award in 1999 for "many WSS contributions."

== Editorial work ==
Cohen served as an associate editor of the Journal of the American Statistical Association from 2004 to 2006. He has been an associate editor of the Journal of Official Statistics since 2003, and a consulting editor of the Journal of Experimental Education since 2010.

== Professional activities ==
Cohen was President of the Washington Academy of Sciences from 2003 to 2004. He was President of the Washington Statistical Society from 2007 to 2008. He served as a member of the Congress of the Mathematical Association of America from 2018 to 2021. He also served on the Board of Directors of the National Association of Academies of Science (2022-2026).

== Selected publications ==
- With Lynn Kuo, Cohen investigated the decision‑theoretic properties of the empirical distribution function.
- He studied how to design statistical surveys when the data are to be analyzed by multilevel models.
- With coauthors, he researched the behavior of rural high school graduates after graduation, in one of the earliest applications of logistic multilevel models.
- With Douglas Wright, he investigated possible bias in the National Assessment of Educational Progress (NAEP) caused by non‑participation of schools.
- He developed the Bayesian bootstrap for unequal probability sampling.
- He explored statistical hypothesis testing when the null hypothesis is an interval.
- In philosophy of science, he conducted research in formal epistemology.
