= Discovery Times Square =

Exhibition space

Coordinates: 40°45′28″N 73°59′15.5″W

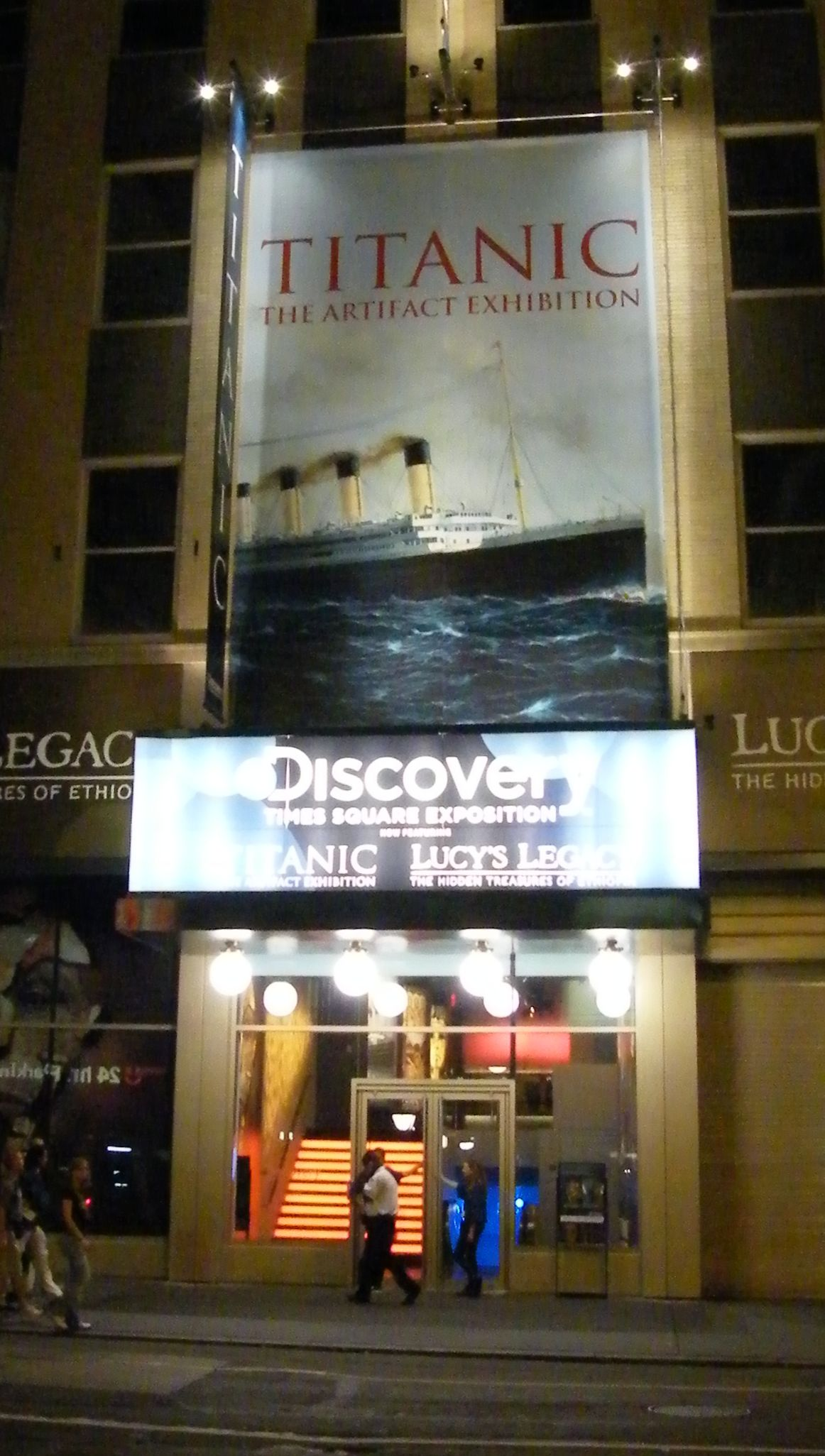
A sign above the entrance advertising Titanic: The Artifact Exhibition

Discovery Times Square (also known as Discovery TSX) was an exhibition space at 226 West 44th Street in New York City that opened June 24, 2009 and closed in September 2016. It specialized in traveling exhibitions with 60,000 square feet of exhibition space. It was one of several exhibition spaces that catered to Times Square tourists (the others being Madame Tussauds and Ripley's Believe It or Not!).

Operated by Discovery Communications and Running Subway Productions, it was located in Times Square in the basement in the former printing plant area of 229 West 43rd Street. Its goal was "to create a home for traveling exhibitions that local museums might find either too large, too expensive, too nondisciplinary or too commercial for their nonprofit attention."

The President of Discovery Times Square was James Sanna. The museum had two directors, Guy Gsell from opening through November 2011 and Jim Arnemann from 2011 through closing. Discovery closed without public notice in September 2016.

== Exhibitions ==
- Titanic: The Artifact Exhibition (2009–2010)
- Lucy's Legacy: The Hidden Treasures of Ethiopia (2009)
- Leonardo da Vinci's Workshop (2009–2010)
- King Tut (2010–2011)
- Pompeii The Exhibit: Life and Death In The Shadows of Vesuvius (2011)
- Harry Potter: The Exhibition (2011–2013)
- CSI: The Experience (2011–2012)
- Dead Sea Scrolls: Life and Faith in Biblical Times (2011–2012)
- Terracotta Warriors: Defenders of China's First Emperor (2012)
- SPY: The Secret World of Espionage (2012–2013)
- SHIPWRECK! Pirates & Treasure (2013)
- The Art of the Brick (2013–2014)
- Body Worlds: Pulse (2013–2014)
- Marvel's Avengers S.T.A.T.I.O.N (2014–2016)
- The Hunger Games: The Exhibition (2015–2016)
- Star Wars and the Power of Costume (2015–2016)
- The Vikings Exhibition (2016)
