= Nathan Yau =

American statistician and data visualization expert

- Born: Nathan Chun-Yin Yau; Fresno, California
- Education: UC Berkeley (BS); UCLA (MS, PhD)
- Known for: FlowingData blog
- Scientific career
- Fields: statistics; data visualization; self-surveillance; information design
- Workplaces: U.S. Census
- Thesis: An Online Tool for Personal Data Collection and Exploration (2013)
- Doctoral advisor: Mark Hansen
- Website: flowingdata.com

Nathan Chun-Yin Yau is an American statistician and data visualization expert.

== Early life ==
Nathan Chun-Yin Yau grew up in Fresno, California.

He received a Bachelor of Science in electrical engineering and computer science from the University of California, Berkeley. He graduated in 2007 with a Master of Science and in 2013 with a PhD in statistics from the University of California, Los Angeles.

His dissertation was titled "An Online Tool for Personal Data Collection and Exploration" and focused on self-surveillance techniques. Yau's earlier self-surveillance work on the "Personal Environmental Impact Report" was featured in Yau's chapter of the book Beautiful Data, published in 2009.

== Career ==
Yau is known for his blog FlowingData in which he publishes writing and tutorials on information design and analytics, as well as visualizations and data science-related projects created by other professionals.

He is the author of books "Visualize This: The FlowingData Guide to Design, Visualization, and Statistics" (2011) and "Data Points: Visualization That Means Something" (2013).

Since 2014, Yau has worked at the U.S. Census as a research mathematical statistician.

== Selected publications ==
- Yau, Nathan (2011). Visualize This (First ed.). John Wiley and Sons. ISBN 9780470944882. OCLC 729943780.
- Yau, Nathan (2013). Data points : visualization that means something (First ed.). John Wiley and Sons. ISBN 9781118462195. OCLC 871319880.
