= Jake Barton =

American museum designer

Jacob ("Jake") Barton
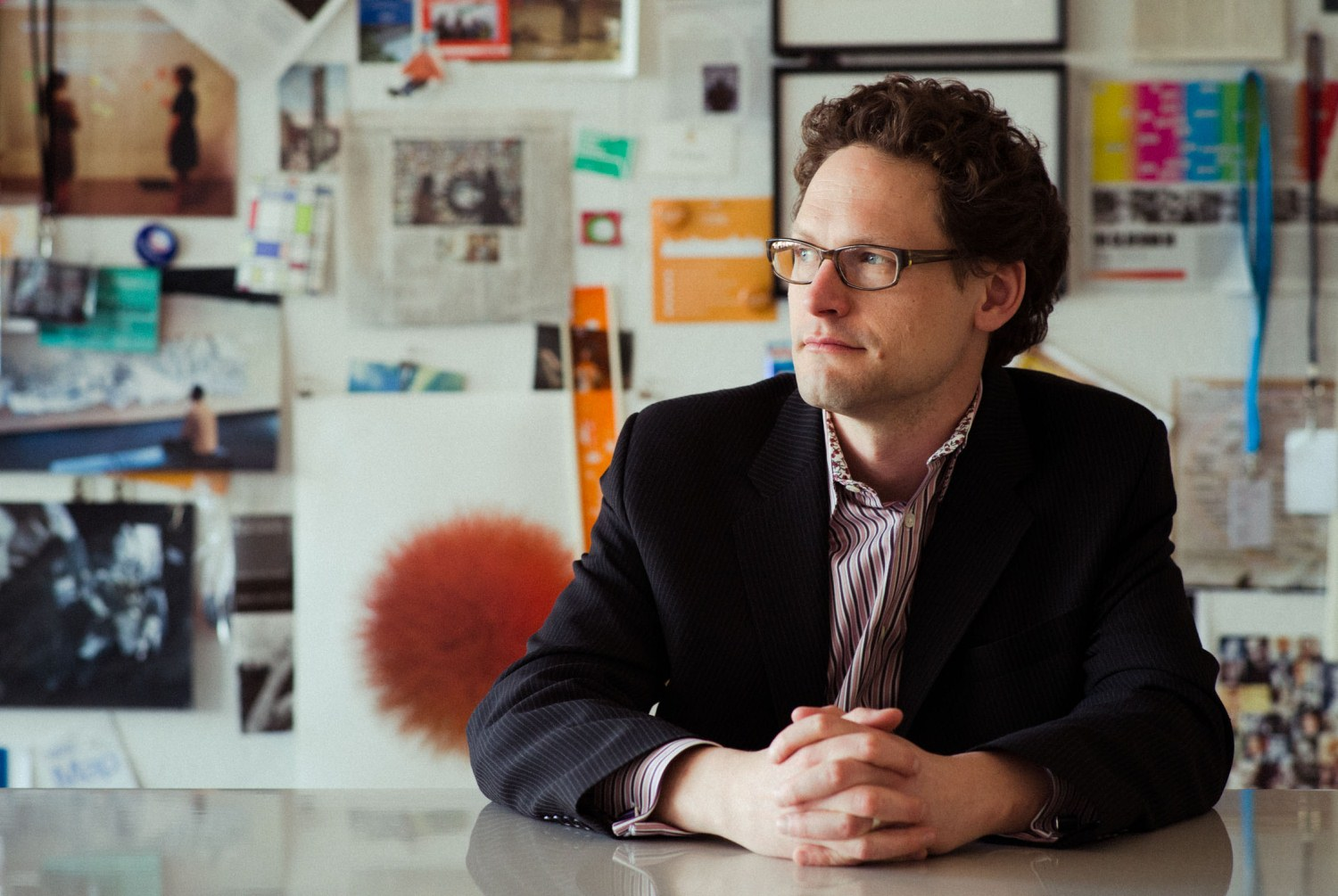
- Born: November 7, 1972 (age 53); Brooklyn, New York, U.S.
- Education: Northwestern University, Bachelor in Science of Speech; New York University, M.P.S. Interactive Telecommunications
- Known for: Exhibition design
- Notable work: 9/11 Memorial and Museum
- Awards: National Design Award; 2013 Interaction Design
- Website: localprojects.net

Jacob ("Jake") Barton (born November 7, 1972, in Brooklyn, New York) is an American designer, and Founder of Local Projects, an experience design firm for museums, brands and public spaces based in New York, New York. His work focuses on storytelling and engaging audiences through emotion and technology.

== Early career ==
In college, Jake Barton majored in performance studies (Bachelor in Science of Speech) at Northwestern University in Chicago. After graduating, he first worked doing set design work on Broadway productions. Eventually Barton started as an intern at the museum design firm, Ralph Appelbaum Associates. Working his way up, he eventually stayed at the company for seven years, and then in 2001 he left his job at Appelbaum and started graduate school at New York University, for a M.P.S. Interactive Telecommunications. He simultaneously launched Local Projects as a design firm for museums and public spaces.

== Local projects ==
Local Projects LLC
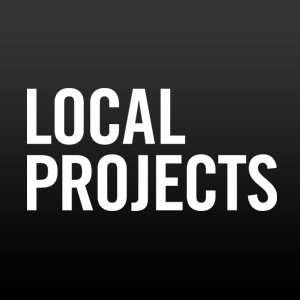
- Type: Subsidiary of MTM
- Industry: Design and Architecture
- Founder: Jake Barton
- Headquarters: 123 William Street, New York City, United States
- Area served: Worldwide
- Key people: Jacob Barton (Principal and Founder)
- Services: Exhibition design consultancy services
- Number of employees: 50–100 (2019)
- Website: www.localprojects.com

Barton was named by Crain's as one of the Top Entrepreneurs of 2013, and his company, Local Projects, which he founded in 2002, has won awards such as the National Design Awards for Interaction Design in 2013, the AIGA Design Competition for Effective Design in 2013 and multiple MUSE Awards in 2013.

Barton's work touches on the overlap of physical and digital, creating a range of applications for museums, education, architecture, and memorials. For the Bill and Melinda Gates Foundation, Local Projects created a next-generation application around experiencing physics on the playground, and has worked with Frank Gehry on the Eisenhower Memorial in Washington, D.C.

As the head of Media Design for the National September 11 Memorial & Museum, Local Projects led a team of designers to create multi-media experiences that focus on using visitor's own stories as well as the use of algorithms to curate up-to-the moment journalism around the post 9/11 world.

During his time working with the 9/11 Memorial, he also led a team, in partnership with Jer Thorp, to create an algorithm that solved the names arrangement on the panels. The names are not listed alphabetically or chronologically, but through personal relationships between the victims themselves.

Jake has spoken about visitor participation in museums and "The Museum of You", and Local Projects credited with bringing emotional storytelling and innovation to architecture. Local Projects has partnered with architects such as Frank Gehry, Diller Scofidio + Renfro and Bjarke Ingels to create new approaches in media and physical spaces.

In March 2019, Local Projects was sold to MTM, an independent network dedicated to creating value between people and brands.

== Works ==
- "'Cooper-Hewitt National Design Museum", 2014
- "National September 11th Memorial Museum", 2014
- "Frank Gehry designed Eisenhower Presidential Memorial", Present
- "Gallery One, Cleveland Museum of Art", 2013
- "Spotlight on Broadway, NYC Mayor’s Office of Movies & Entertainment", 2013
- "BIG HEART NYC, Times Square Alliance", 2012
- "Welcome Home, National Building Museum", 2012
- "Six Films, National Building Museum", 2012
- "SeaWorld Rescue, Seaworld San Diego", 2012
- "9/11 Memorial Names Arrangement Software, 9/11 Memorial", 2011
- "Change By Us, CEOs For Cities, Local Projects", 2011
- "9/11 Memorial Guide, 9/11 Memorial", 2011
- "The Immigration Experience, It’s Your Story, Innovation and Expansion, The Synagogue Experience, Competing Visions, Contemporary Issues Forum, Dreams of Freedom, National Museum of American Jewish History", 2010
- "Urbanology, BMW/ Guggenheim Lab", 2011
- "GE Showcase, GE", 2010
- "StoryCorps, StoryCorps", 2002

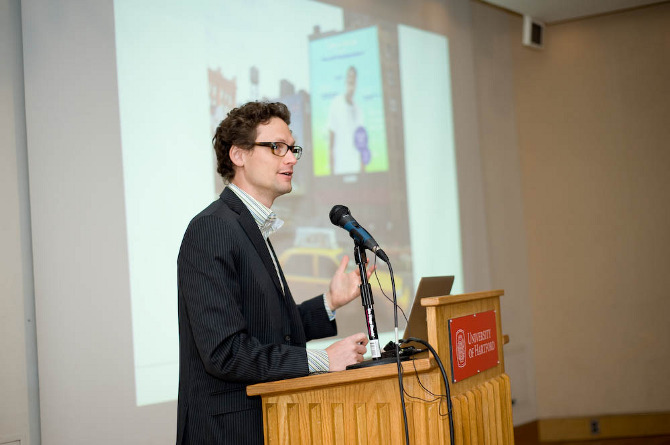
Jake Barton at a talk

== See also ==
- Ralph Appelbaum Associates, US firm
- Event Communications, UK firm
- Gallagher & Associates, US firm
- Cultural tourism
- Exhibit design
- Exhibition designer
