= Kyle McDonald =

Media artist

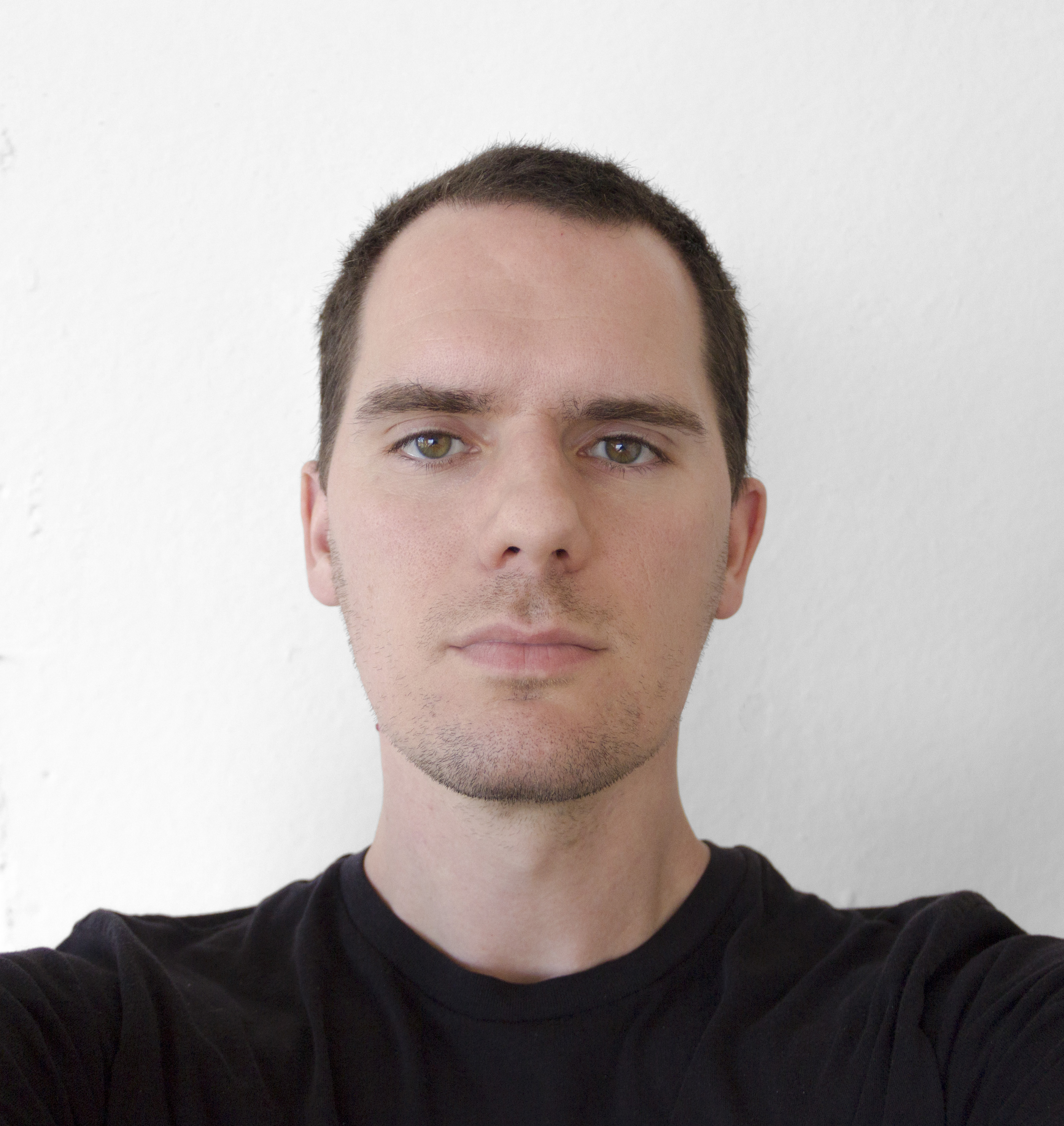
- Self-portrait of artist Kyle McDonald
- Organization: Free Art and Technology Lab

Kyle McDonald is a media artist. McDonald creates visually appealing models using code, and releases tool kits for other artists to customize their own art as they see fit. McDonald was recently an adjunct professor at New York University Tisch School of the Arts' ITP. He is a member of F.A.T lab (Free Art and Technology Lab), and a community manager for OpenFrameworks. He was a resident at STUDIO for Creative Inquiry at Carnegie Mellon University.

== Work/Research ==
Kyle McDonald worked on certifying AI images. He identified fakes called "generative adversarial networks" (GANs). They essentially take data into a neural network, and it is "trained" to produce the best possible image. While most images generated by these types of networks have become increasingly tough to decipher, McDonald claims credit for positive identifications and offers proof for his marked deep-fakes. For example, GAN's have a tough time with background images because they home in on the face in the image, and as a result, produces a random one.

As part of his work/research, McDonald and his partner Lauren McCarthy worked on a project called MWITM(Man/Woman in the middle). Essentially, there was a server that would intercept the messages, and two chatbots, one for each artist, would communicate automatically without any direct messaging. The messages created were based on the communication style of the users, and were trained over time.

Work by McDonald has inspired Spotify's "Listening Together" feature.

== Other accomplishments ==
"Social Soul," 2014

"Light Leaks," 2018

"Meaningful Interactions," 2016

"The Thrill of Terrapattern, A New Way to Search Satellite Imagery," 2016

"Meet Terrapattern, Google Earth's Missing Search Engine," 2016

"The Augmented Hand Series -- Playful, dreamlike, and uncanny," 2015

"An Addictive Experiment in Annotating Footage from a London Street," 2015

"Exhausting a Crowd," 2015

"Wifi Whisperer," 2016

"Highsight," 2015

"Untitled Digital Art," 2014

"Sharing Faces," 2016

"How We Act Together," 2016

"Hacking Surveillance Culture," 2014
