= Grammy Museum at L.A. Live =

Music museum in Los Angeles, US

The Grammy Museum

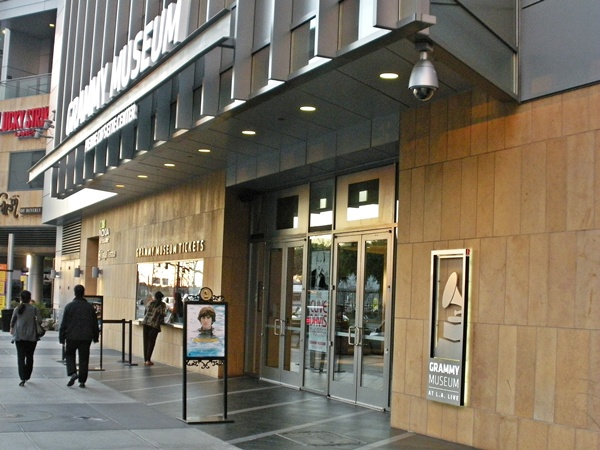
- Museum entrance
- Established: December 2008; 17 years ago
- Location: 800 West Olympic Boulevard; Los Angeles, California
- Coordinates: 34°2′41″N 118°15′53″W
- Type: Music museum
- Director: Michael Sticka
- Public transit access: Pico
- Website: grammymuseum.org
- Opening hours: 10:30am–6:30pm (Sun–Thu); 10am–8pm (Fri/Sat); Closed Tuesdays

The Grammy Museum is an interactive, educational museum devoted to the history and winners of the Grammy Awards. The museum has interactive touch-screens, videos, recording booths, and a collection of historical music artifacts including costumes and instruments from the Grammy Awards, hand-written lyrics, records, and audio/video recordings.

In addition to the original in downtown Los Angeles, there is also The Grammy Museum Mississippi in Cleveland, Mississippi, and a Grammy Museum Gallery at the Musicians Hall of Fame in Nashville, Tennessee. The Grammy Museum Experience opened in autumn 2017 at the Prudential Center in Newark, New Jersey. The museum in the exact same state closed on June 25, 2023.

== History ==
The Grammy Museum, located in downtown Los Angeles's L.A. Live, opened in December 2008 corresponding to the Grammy Awards' 50th anniversary. The museum consists of four floors, including historical music artifacts displays, interactive instrument stations and recording booths, and a 200-seat Clive Davis Theater.

Since its opening, the Grammy Museum has presented over 300 public programs including educational programs for young students.

== Exhibits ==
The Grammy Museum explores the creative process; the art and technology of the recording process; and the history of the Grammy Awards.

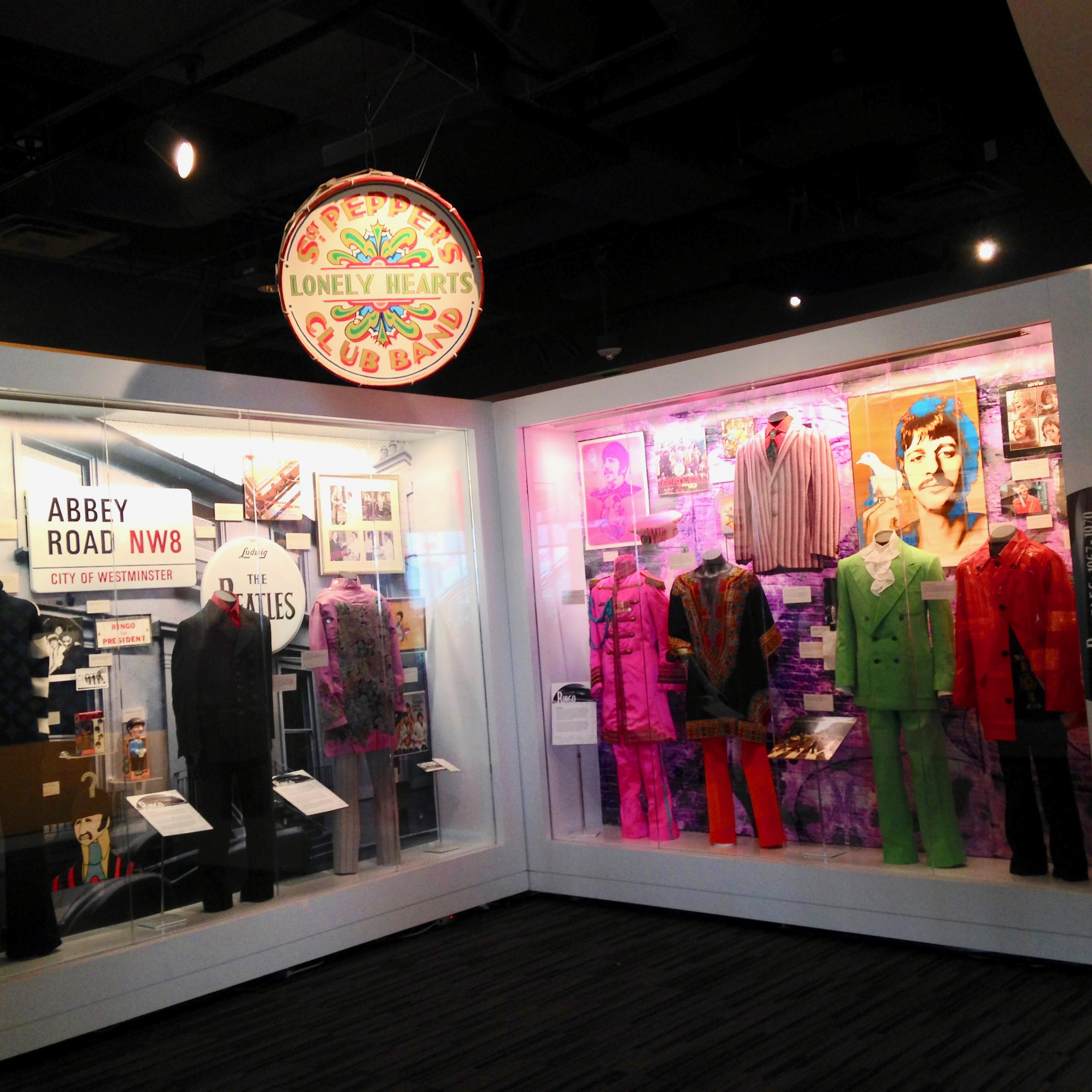
The Ringo: Peace & Love exhibit at the Grammy Museum

The Grammy Museum features exhibits including: behind-the-scenes live performances, seminars, classes, musician meet-and-greets, and interactive recording booths. The museum starts on the fourth floor and continues down to the third and second floor. The exhibit, Crossroads, on the fourth floor, features touch-screens to view photos and listen to music of all genres. Another interactive exhibit allows the user to go inside six different sound-proof recording booths as famous performers and producers teach about different stages of producing commercial soundtracks. Visitors can record their own singing and rapping track, and remix it to produce a cover of various pop songs. The museum also has outfits worn by Grammy Award-winning musicians such as Taylor Swift, Sabrina Carpenter, Whitney Houston, and Amy Winehouse.

The Grammy Museum regularly updates and displays special exhibits. Some current and past exhibits include:

- The Beatles LOVE by Cirque du Soleil exhibit, June 8, 2011 – February 2012
- Bob Marley, Messenger exhibit, May 11, 2011 – October 2, 2011
- Say it loud: The Genius of James Brown exhibit, September 17, 2011 – January 22, 2012
- Michael Jackson exhibit, June 25, 2011 – end to be determined
- Barbra Streisand exhibit, until February 2012
- Muzak Archives Preservation exhibit. Touring Internationally through 2011
- Golden Gods: The History of Heavy Metal, April 11, 2012 – February 2013
- Whitney!, August 15, 2012 – February 15, 2013
- Ringo: Peace and Love, June 12, 2013 – March 30, 2014
- Taylor Swift Experience: December 2014 – October 2015
- Ravi Shankar: A Life in Music, May 2015 – spring 2016
- Backstreet Boys exhibit, April 10 – September 2, 2019
- Beyond Black – The Style of Amy Winehouse, January 17, 2020 – April 13, 2020

Past Exhibits

- John Lennon, Songwriter (closed September 6, 2011)
- Roy Orbison: The Soul of Rock & Roll exhibit, May 16, 2011 – December 1, 2011
- Hip Hop: A Cultural Odyssey exhibit, (closed May 4, 2011)
- Strange Kozmic Experience (closed January 17, 2011)
- Instruments of Art (closed December 31, 2010)
- I Am, I Said: Selections from the Neil Diamond Collection (closed May 10, 2010)
- Elvis at 21: Photographs by Alfred Wertheimer (closed March 28, 2010)
- Occupation Dreamer: The Photography of Moshe Brakha (closed August 9, 2009)
- Jenni Rivera, singer-songwriter (closed May 11, 2014)
- Columbia Records 360 exhibit (one year display Nov. 2012 to closed Sept. 2013
- Shakira, Shakira: The GRAMMY Museum Experience, March 4, 2023 – 2024

== Special events and programs ==
The Grammy Museum frequently holds live performances, screenings and discussions in its Clive Davis Theater and on the Ray Charles Terrace. Public Programs with musicians such as Ben Harper, Flavor Flav, and John Legend are open to the public. Museum members receive priority ticketing and seating.

== Location and hours ==
The Grammy Museum is located in Los Angeles downtown's L.A. Live campus at the corner of Figueroa Street and Olympic Boulevard. The museum has an Olympic Boulevard address, but the main entrance is on Figueroa Street. Bronze disks for each year's Grammy Awards – honoring the top winners, Record of the Year, Best New Artist, Album of the Year, and Song of the Year – are embedded in the sidewalks on the streets of LA Live.

The museum opens on Sunday to Thursday from 10:30 am to 6:30 pm and on Friday and Saturday from 10:00 am to 8:00 pm. The Museum is closed on Tuesdays and Wednesdays.

== See also ==
- List of music museums
