= Dead Sea Scrolls: Life and Faith in Ancient Times =

Travelling exhibition of artifacts

Dead Sea Scrolls: Life and Faith in Ancient Times, also known as Dead Sea Scrolls: The Exhibition, is a travelling exhibition of artifacts from the ancient Kingdoms of Israel and Judah, including a select number of the Dead Sea Scrolls. The exhibition was created by the Israel Antiquities Authority with items from the Israel National Treasures Department, and was produced by Discovery Times Square and the Franklin Institute. The exhibition claims to be the largest display of ancient Israeli artifacts ever displayed outside of Israel.

== Tour history ==
The exhibition first opened in New York City on October 28, 2011, under the title Dead Sea Scrolls: Life and Faith in Biblical Times. It is curated by Dr. Risa Levitt Kohn of San Diego State University, and Debora Ben Ami of the Israel Antiquities Authority.

== On display ==
The exhibition features twenty of the Dead Sea Scrolls, displayed ten at a time. About 600 artifacts from the ancient Kingdoms of Israel and Judah are also displayed, including a stone block from the Western Wall of Jerusalem's Temple Mount.

== Tour schedule ==
Venue	Venue location	Exhibition dates
Discovery Times Square	New York City, New York	October 28, 2011 – April 15, 2012
Franklin Institute	Philadelphia, Pennsylvania	May 12, 2012 – October 14, 2012
Cincinnati Museum Center	Cincinnati, Ohio	November 16, 2012 – April 14, 2013
Museum of Science	Boston, Massachusetts	May 19, 2013 – October 20, 2013
The Leonardo	Salt Lake City, Utah	November 22, 2013 – April 27, 2014
California Science Center	Los Angeles, California	March 10, 2015 – September 7, 2015
Denver Museum of Nature and Science	Denver, Colorado	March 16, 2018 – September 3, 2018
