= Jer Thorp =

Canadian data artist

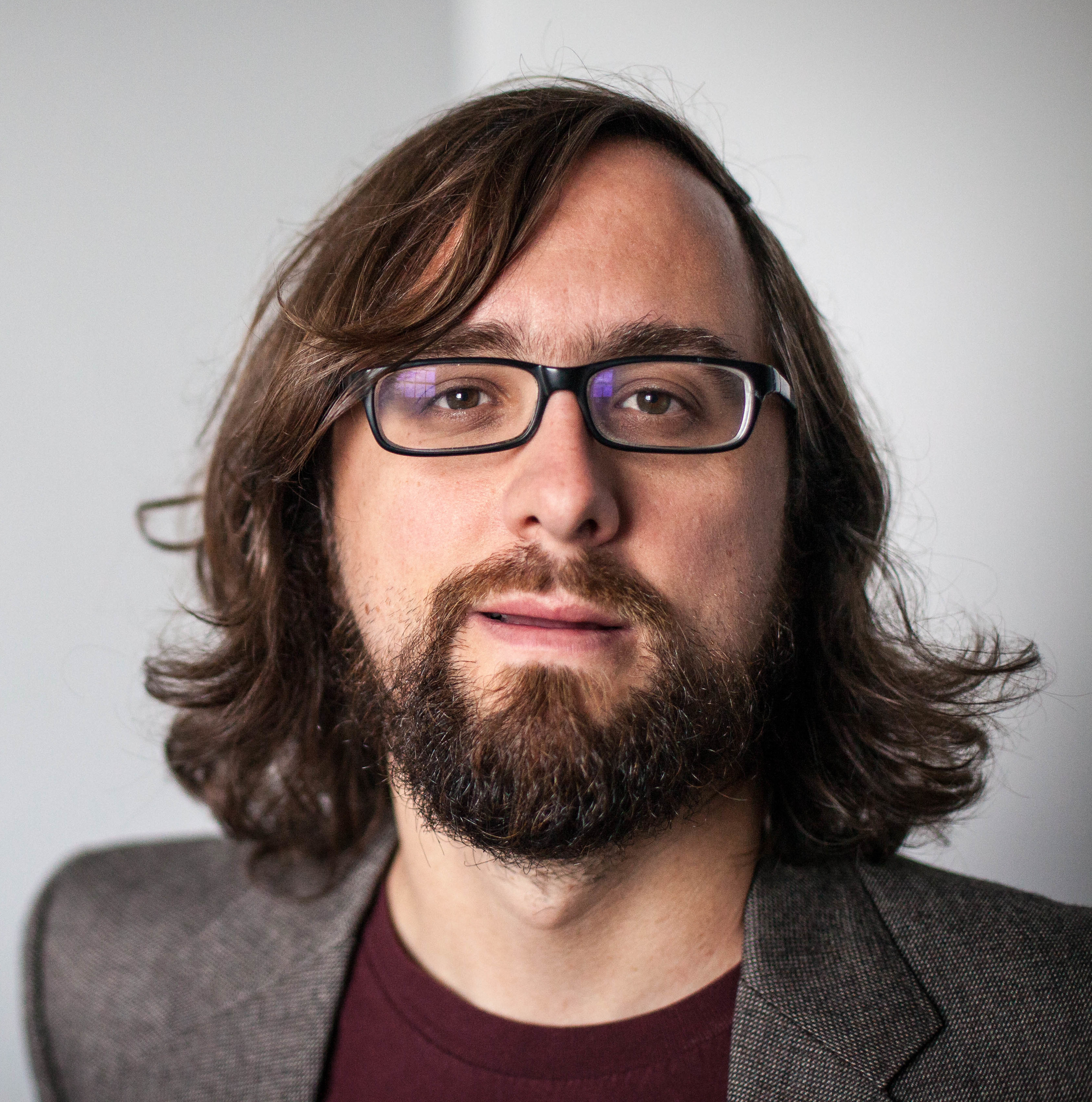
- Born: Vancouver, British Columbia
- Citizenship: Canada
- Scientific career
- Fields: Statistics; Data visualization
- Website: www.jerthorp.me

Jer Thorp (born 1974/5) is a Canadian data artist from Vancouver, British Columbia. Before becoming a data artist, he was originally trained as a geneticist. He holds an adjunct faculty position at New York University’s Tisch School of the Arts in the Interactive Telecommunications Program. He was the Data Artist in Residence at the New York Times in 2012, where he created Cascade, a tool for visualizing how stories were shared across social media. and the Innovator-In-Residence at the Library of Congress in 2017.

== Work ==
He and Jake Barton created an algorithm that arranged the names of those killed in the 9/11 attacks, respecting their familial, personal and business relationships with each other; his visualization of their relatedness is exhibited at the 9/11 Memorial in New York City. Thorp collaborated with Mark Hansen, Ben Rubin, and Local Projects to create an interactive timeline of the attacks. Thorp's visualization of the influence of Albert Einstein's theory of relativity on contemporary scientific research appeared in Scientific American's September 2015 commemorative issue on Einstein and was featured in The Best American Infographics 2016.

Thorp is the co-creator of a data-based public artwork called Herald / Harbinger in downtown Calgary. He co-founded The Office for Creative Research, which was a Brooklyn data management and visualization consultancy. He is one of the founders of the Eyeo festival.

In 2021, Thorp released his first book, Living in Data: A Citizen's Guide to a Better Information Future.
