= The Numbers Game =

The Numbers Game is a reality television infotainment series premiered on April 22, 2013, on National Geographic Channel that explores the numbers and stats in life's major events- birth, death, marriage, money etc. Hosted by data scientist Jake Porway, the show uses data science to unveil hidden numbers through street experiments and interactive game play to guide us to make smart decisions about our destiny.

== Episodes ==
No.	Title
1	"Are You a Big Liar?"
2	"Are you a Jerk?"
3	"Are you a Risk Taker?"
4	"Are you a Sucker?"
5	"Are you Desirable?"
6	"Are You Superstitious?"
7	"Can Code Breaking Improve Our Life?"
8	"Can You Get What You Want?"
9	"Could You Be a Hero?"
10	"Could You Be The Boss?"
11	"Could You Survive a Zombie Apocalypse?"
12	"How Tough Are You?"
13	"What Drives you Crazy?"
14	"When will you Die?"
15	"Will You Make a Million?"
