= Stefanie Posavec =

American graphic designer

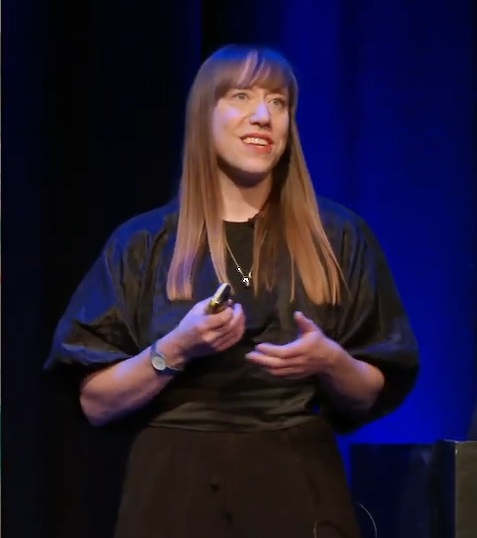
- Stefanie Posavec in 2023
- Born: 1981 (age 44–45)
- Education: Colorado State University, Central Saint Martins, University of the Arts London
- Notable work: Dear Data
- Website: www.dear-data.com

Stefanie Posavec is a London-based information designer whose work focuses on non-traditional representations of data, born in 1981. She co-authored the 2016 book Dear Data with Giorgia Lupi.

== Education ==
Posavec graduated from Colorado State University with a Bachelor of fine Arts (B.F.A.) in Graphic Design. Posavec credits her experience at CSM with cultivating her interest in data.

After receiving her M.A., Posavec worked as a book cover designer and a freelancer for data-related design projects.

== Work ==
In 2010, Posavec helped design and collect data for the cover art featured on OK Go's album, Of the Blue Colour of the Sky. She was the 2013 Facebook Artist in Residence, creating the piece "Relationship Dance Steps."

Posavec also co-authored Dear Data with Giorgia Lupi in 2016. Dear Data is a culmination of a year-long project translating personal data into hand-drawn visualizations. The book was designated "Most Beautiful" at the Kantar Information is Beautiful Awards in 2015 and was nominated for the Design Museum’s "Designs of the Year" award in 2016. In 2016, Dear Data was acquired by the Museum of Modern Art as a part of its permanent collection.

Her work is exhibited at various museums and art houses, including the Museum of Modern Art (MoMA) in New York, the Centro Cultural Banco do Brasil in Rio de Janeiro, the Science Gallery in Dublin, and the Victoria and Albert Museum in London.
