= The Grammy Museum Mississippi =

Museum featuring Mississippi Delta music in Cleveland, Mississippi, United States

GRAMMY Museum Mississippi

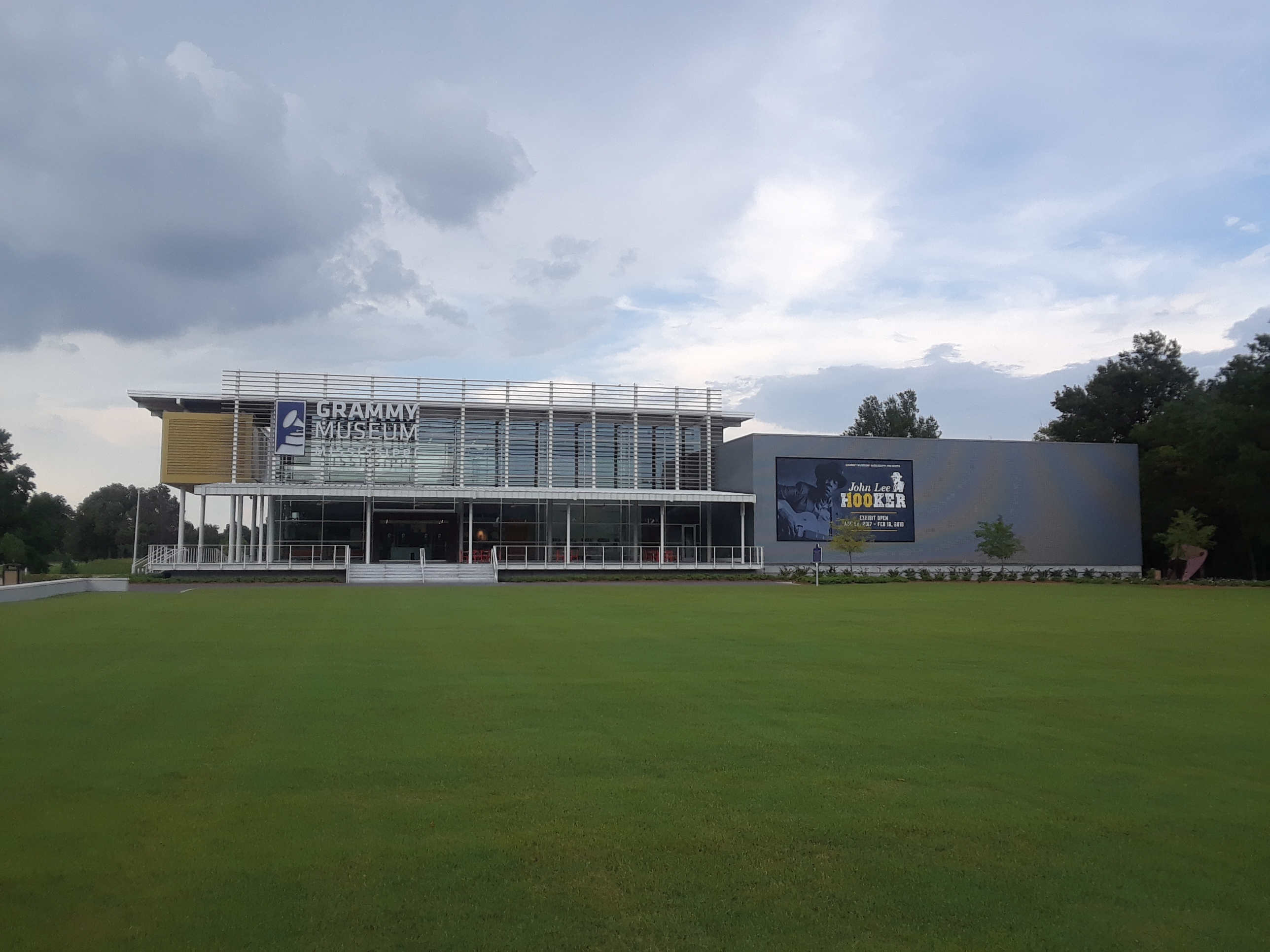
- GRAMMY Museum Mississippi pictured in 2018
- Established: March 2016
- Location: 800 W Sunflower Road, Cleveland, United States
- Coordinates: 33.748155°N 90.731234°W
- Type: Music museum
- Director: Emily Havens
- Website: http://www.grammymuseumms.org/

GRAMMY Museum Mississippi is a 28,000-square-foot (2,600 m^{2}) interactive music-centered museum and event center located in Cleveland, Mississippi, United States. It focuses on the history of The Grammys, the continuing musical achievements of Mississippians, and much more.

== Background and History ==
The museum opened on March 5, 2016, with the help of Cleveland Mayor Billy Nowell, Cleveland Chamber of Commerce, and the advertising firm Hammons and Associates. Hammons helped produce the B.B. King Museum and Delta Interpretive Center in Indianola. A non-profit organization called the Cleveland Music Foundation started developing the museum in 2011, constructed the museum, and has managed it since its opening. Its sister museum, Grammy Museum at L.A. Live, is located in downtown Los Angeles. While both locations have a focus on the historical and cultural importance of previous, current, and future musicians, the Cleveland location emphasizes on the ingrained lineage of the Mississippi Delta's musical influence. Similar artifacts, films, and storylines from the Los Angeles museum are displayed, while approximately 20% of the exhibits focus on Mississippi in order to highlight both Grammy winners and the musicians who influenced the music industry.

The museum has many exhibits that visitors can view and learn more about as they browse through. Many events are held at the museum as well, including receptions, award banquets, employee parties, conferences, meetings, weddings, and special occasions.

The museum, a nearly $20 million development, is a smaller, but more updated version of the Los Angeles museum. The design of the museum is meant to reflect both the glamorous aspects of the Grammys as well as the Delta's rustic culture. It features high-definition touch screens and interactive technology making it one of the most advanced museums in the nation. However, the sharecropper shacks that were homes to numerous blues musicians are replicated with the corrugated metal on the museum's exterior. Furthermore, the large front porch entrance mimics the staple southern architecture.

== Exhibits ==
The GRAMMY Museum Mississippi's exhibits aim to celebrate all forms of music with the goal of educating and inspiring future generations to create and explore new forms of music using the roots that have existed in this country for centuries. The Museum features a variety of exhibits that highlight the evolution of American music through history using modern technology such as touch-screens, interactive dance floors, and interactive instruments; while also featuring historical musical artifacts like instruments and clothing used by previous Grammy winners. There are also thirteen additional displays that showcase aspects of Grammy culture throughout the years.

Throughout the exhibits there are several outfits on display that were worn by artist at various Grammy Awards ceremonies over the years, and by other artists who have won Grammy Awards. The outfits cover artist from all genres. On display includes outfits worn by: Taylor Swift, Beyonce, Count Basie, Bobby Rush, Charli XCX, and many others. There is also a section that displays outfits from Mississippi Artists such as Elvis Presley, Faith Hill, Charley Pride, Steve Azar, and many more. Outfits on display are always changing.

Exhibit	Date	Features
Pride & Joy: The Texas Blues of Stevie Ray Vaughan	June 30, 2016 – February 19, 2017	guitars, photographs, outfits, handwritten lyric, concert posters, etc.

Displays	Features
Great Grammy Performances	Mini surround-sound theater to view previous GRAMMY telecasts
History of The Grammy Awards	Interactive timeline of GRAMMY history, featuring Album of the Year and GRAMMY archives and Recent Winners
On The Red carpet	Original clothing worn by artists on the GRAMMY Red Carpet
Dance to the Music	Learn dance moves from GRAMMY winner Ne-Yo on a colorful dance floor
Mono To Surround	The history of recorded sound from 1877 to present day
Singing & Songwriting/ Producing Pods	Keb' Mo' is featured in an interactive pod- writing and recording of blue songs
The Roland Room	Interactive room with electronic musical instruments
Legacy of The Electric Guitar	The history of the electric guitar
Culture Shock	Audiovisual timeline though the past 50 years in modern music
Mississippi Music Bar	Interactive radio, select and listen to hit songs by Mississippians
Mississippi Music Table	Interactive exhibit that portrays artists and their songs, photos, awards, and more
Sanders Soundstage	140-seat theater (State-of-the-art)
Iconic Instruments	Features instruments used in performances by a few of the GRAMMY winning musicians

Previous Exhibits

Exhibit	Date	Features
Ladies and Gentlemen...The Beatles!	March 5, 2016 – June 12, 2016	artifacts, interviews, correspondence, instruments, posters, photographs, interviews, interactive displays, and an oral history

== Special events and programs ==
The museum offers a series of programs including upcoming programs and member programs. The upcoming programs include a "spotlight" artist, classic artists, artists from all over the world, and upcoming artists. An example would be "Nigel Hall". Member programs feature a more unique selection of featured programs such as, "A Celebration of" 'Pride & Joy: The Texas Blues of Stevie Ray Vaughan", "Celebrating Prince", and "Beatles Symposium 2016: From the Cavern to the Candlestick". The various programs offered reach out to a broad audience including music fanatics and students.

== Location ==
The GRAMMY Museum Mississippi is located on the campus of Delta State University in Cleveland, Mississippi at 800 West Sunflower Road. The museum is built on the former site of the Delta State golf course. The choosing to build the site in Cleveland has always been a frequently asked question. The primary case for choosing the state for the museum's location was the Mississippi Delta's deep history with music. Legendary Mississippi-native musicians including Robert Johnson, B.B. King, and Elvis Presley influenced America's most accepted music styles such as the blues, jazz, hip-hop, and rock n' roll. Mississippians represent a remarkable number of Grammy recipients when taking the state's relatively small population into consideration. In fact, as of 2025, the state holds the most Grammy winners in the United States along with many other nominees, Lifetime Achievement winners, and Hall of Famers. More specifically, Cleveland, Mississippi was selected for its notable location and the local university. Cleveland not only puts the museum in the heart of the Delta, but along Highway 61, which is directly in the middle of Memphis and New Orleans. Additionally, the city's four-year institution, Delta State University, is the state's only accredited college program for music industry studies, known as the Delta Music Institute (DMI) where students can major in Audio Engineering or Entertainment Industry Entrepreneurship. The museum has a close affiliation with that department and its GRAMMY U program affiliation, often having artists who host programs at the museum visit the institute and meet with students.

== See also ==
- List of music museums
