= List of assets owned by the Coca-Cola Company =

The following is a list of assets owned by the Coca-Cola Company. The Coca-Cola Company had equity positions in 51 unconsolidated bottling, canning and distribution operations which produced approximately 58% of volume. Significant investees include:

== List ==
Company	% owned	% of market	Area
International Beverages Pvt. Ltd.	100%	1%	Bangladesh
Diamond Beverages Pvt. Ltd.	1%	1% Area-Isr	
Costa Coffee	100%		Worldwide
Monster Beverage Corporation	100%		Latin America
Coca-Cola Europacific Partners	19.5%	79%	United States
Coca-Cola Europacific Partners	19.5%	99%	Canada (excluding Quebec)
Coca-Cola Europacific Partners	19.5%	100%	Great Britain
Coca-Cola Europacific Partners	19.5%	100%	Continental France, Benelux, Monaco
Coca-Cola Europacific Partners	19.5%	100%	Europe, Australia, Asia-Pacific, Indonesia, Philippines
Coca-Cola FEMSA	41%	49%	Mexico
Coca-Cola FEMSA	41%	17%	Brazil
Coca-Cola FEMSA	41%	99%	Colombia
Coca-Cola FEMSA	41%	48%	Guatemala
Coca-Cola FEMSA	41%	100%	Costa Rica, Ecuador, Nicaragua, Panama, Peru, Venezuela
Coca-Cola FEMSA	41%	31%	Argentina
Coca-Cola Bottling Shqipëria			Albania
Coca-Cola Hellenic	24.5%	100%	Armenia, Austria, Belarus, Bosnia-Herzegovina, Bulgaria, Croatia, the Czech Republic, Estonia, Greece, Hungary, Ireland, Kosovo, Latvia, Lithuania, North Macedonia, Moldova, Montenegro, Nigeria, Northern Ireland, Poland, Romania, Russia, Serbia, Slovakia, Slovenia, Sri Lanka, Switzerland and Ukraine
Coca-Cola Hellenic	24.5%	68%	Italy
Coca-Cola İçecek	20.1%	100%	Azerbaijan, Iraq, Jordan, Kazakhstan, Kyrgyzstan, Pakistan, Syria, Tajikistan, Turkey, Turkmenistan, Bangladesh
Coca-Cola Bottling Co.	28.3%		United States
Embotelladora Andina	12%	1%	Chile, Argentina, part of Brazil
Coca-Cola du Canada, Ltée	1%	1%	Canada - Quebec only
Coca-Cola AG, Deutschland	1%	1%	Germany
Refreshment Products Finland Oy	1%	1%	Finland
Thums Up	100%	1%	India
Limca	100%	1%	India

== Disclosed subsidiaries ==
The following subsidiaries are listed in Coca-Cola's 2025 annual report, as of December 31, 2025. The filing excludes some smaller subsidiaries.

- Atlantic Industries
- BA Sports Nutrition, LLC
- Barlan, Inc.
- Beverage Financial Centre Unlimited Company
- Carolina Coca-Cola Bottling Investments, Inc.
- CCHBC Grouping, Inc.
- Coca-Cola (China) Investment Limited
- Coca-Cola (Japan) Company, Limited
- Coca-Cola Beverages (Shanghai) Company Limited
- Coca-Cola Beverages Africa Proprietary Limited
- Coca-Cola de Chile S.A.
- Coca-Cola Industrias Limitada — Brazil
- Coca-Cola Industrias, Sociedad de Responsabilidad Limitada
- Coca-Cola Midi S.A.S.
- Coca-Cola Oasis LLC
- Coca-Cola Overseas Parent Limited LLC
- Coca-Cola Refreshments USA, LLC
- Coca-Cola South Asia Holdings, Inc.
- Costa Limited
- Dulux CBAI 2003 B.V.
- Energy Brands Inc.
- European Refreshments Unlimited Company
- fairlife, LLC
- Fresh Trading Limited
- Hindustan Coca-Cola Beverages Private Limited
- Hindustan Coca-Cola Holdings Private Limited
- Hindustan Coca-Cola Overseas Holdings Pte. Limited
- Pacific Refreshments Pte. Ltd.
- Recofarma Industria do Amazonas Ltda.
- Red Life Reinsurance Limited
- Red Re Captive Insurance Company, Inc.
- Servicios Integrados de Administracion y Alta Gerencia, S. de R.L. de C.V.
- Servicios y Productos para Bebidas Refrescantes S.R.L.
- The Coca-Cola Export Corporation
- The Coca-Cola Trading Company LLC
- The Inmex Corporation
- Varoise de Concentres S.A.S.

== Former assets ==
- Beverage Partners Worldwide (50%; co-owned with Nestlé)
- Columbia Pictures
- Columbia Pictures Television
- TriStar Pictures
- TriStar Television
- RCA/Columbia Pictures Home Video/RCA/Columbia Pictures International Video (Half owned by RCA)
- Coca-Cola Telecommunications
- Embassy Pictures
- Merv Griffin Enterprises

== See also ==
- Lists of corporate assets
- List of Coca-Cola brands
