= Donald Keough =

American businessman (1926–2015)

- Born: Donald Raymond Keough; September 4, 1926; Maurice, Iowa, U.S.
- Died: February 24, 2015 (aged 88); Atlanta, Georgia, U.S.
- Education: Creighton University
- Known for: Chief operating officer and a director of The Coca-Cola Company
- Awards: Presidential Distinguished Service Award

Donald Raymond Keough (September 4, 1926 – February 24, 2015) was an American businessman and chairman of the Board of Allen & Company LLC, a New York investment banking firm. He was elected to that position in April 1993.

Keough retired as president, chief operating officer and a director of The Coca-Cola Company in April 1993, positions he had held since early 1981; his tenure with the company began in 1950. From 1986 to 1993 he served as chairman of the Board of Coca-Cola Enterprises, Inc., the world's largest bottling system. From 1985 to 1989 he also served as Chairman of Columbia Pictures, Inc., before it was acquired by Sony, Inc. Keough is probably best known for his major role in promoting the infamous reformulation of Coca-Cola, "New Coke" in April, 1985. He was largely responsible for convincing Coca-Cola CEO Roberto Goizueta to bring back the original Coca-Cola less than three months later, amidst a firestorm of negative consumer backlash.

Keough was on the Boards of IAC/InterActiveCorp, Yankee Global Enterprises LLC, Berkshire Hathaway and The Coca-Cola Company, to which he was elected in February 2004. In addition, he served for many years as a member of the Boards of McDonald's Corporation, The Washington Post Company, H. J. Heinz Company, Convera Corporation and The Home Depot.

He was chairman emeritus of the board of trustees and a Life Trustee of the University of Notre Dame. He was also a trustee of several other educational, charitable and civic organizations.

== Biography ==
Keough was born in Maurice, Iowa. He received various honors, including honorary doctorates from his alma mater Creighton University, the University of Notre Dame, Emory University, Trinity College in Dublin, Ireland and Clark University. The University of Notre Dame's highest honor, the Laetare Medal, was presented to Keough in May 1993, and he was Irish America magazine's first Irish-American of the Year, also in 1993. Keough was elected a Fellow of the American Academy of Arts & Sciences in 2002 and was inducted into the Junior Achievement National Business Hall of Fame in 2003. In 2007 he was presented with honorary Irish citizenship by the then-President of Ireland, Mary McAleese.

In November 2010, he was the first honoree inducted into the Irish America Hall of Fame. In March 2013, he received the Presidential Distinguished Service Award (honoring members of the Irish diaspora) from Michael D. Higgins, President of Ireland. Keough Hall at the University of Notre Dame is named after his wife of 65 years, Marilyn Keough, who survived him. Keough died in Atlanta, Georgia at the age of 88 on February 24, 2015. Marilyn died in October 2016.

== Bibliography ==
- Keough, Donald R. (2011). The Ten Commandments for Business Failure. Foreword by Warren Buffett. Portfolio. ISBN 978-1591844136.

| Preceded by Roberto Goizueta | President of The Coca-Cola Company | Succeeded by Douglas Ivester and John Hunter |
