= New Holland, Georgia =

Unincorporated community in Georgia, U.S.

New Holland
- Unincorporated community
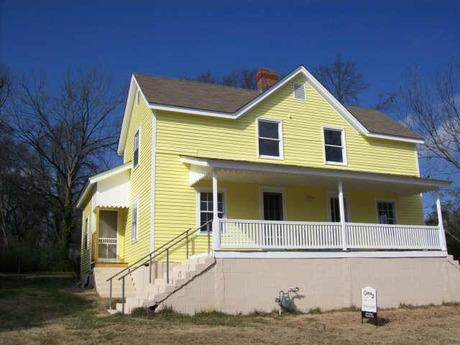
- Mill House, Built 1903, by the Pacolet Mill

- Location in Georgia
- Coordinates: 34°18′25″N 83°48′09″W
- Country: United States
- State: Georgia
- County: Hall
- Established: 1890s

Population
  - Total: 600
- Time zone: UTC-5 (Eastern (EST))

New Holland is an unincorporated community in Hall County, Georgia, United States. New Holland was constructed by the Pacolet Manufacturing Company in the 1890s and consisted of several hundred homes for workers in the Pacolet Cotton Mill. A central feature was New Holland Springs, which purportedly had health-giving properties. The village has a population of approximately 600. The New Holland mill is currently owned and operated by Milliken, Inc.

== Notable people ==
- Douglas Ivester, former CEO of The Coca-Cola Company, born in New Holland
- Brad Strickland, science-fiction and mystery novelist, born in New Holland
