= Paul Austin =

Paul Austin may refer to:

- J. Paul Austin (1915–1985), American chairman, president and CEO of the Coca-Cola Company
- Paul Britten Austin (1922–2005), English author, translator and scholar of Swedish literature
