= CCBA =

CCBA is an abbreviation that could refer to:

- Chinese Consolidated Benevolent Association, associations established in various parts of the United States with large populations of Chinese people.
- Climate, Community & Biodiversity Alliance, an initiative to promote the development of land management activities that simultaneously deliver significant benefits for climate, local communities, and biodiversity
- Coca-Cola Beverages Africa, a Coca-Cola beverage bottling company based in South Africa
- Cook County Bar Association, Illinois, United States
- Chinese Contract Bridge Association, governing body of contract bridge in China (People's Republic of)
