= Huiyuan =

Huiyuan may refer to:

- Lushan Huiyuan (334–416), a Chinese Buddhist
- Jingying Huiyuan (c. 523–592), a Chinese Buddhist scholar-monk
- Huiyuan (imperial examination), an examination rank
- Huiyuan, Xinjiang, township in Xinjiang, China
- Huiyuan Juice, company headquartered in Beijing, China
