= CCNR =

CCNR could mean:

- Central Catchment Nature Reserve, the largest nature reserve in Singapore
- Central Commission for Navigation on the Rhine
- China CNR, a national rail rolling stock manufacturer, before a merger created CRRC
- Center for Complex Network Research at Northeastern University
- Canadian Coalition for Nuclear Responsibility, see Anti-nuclear movement in Canada
- Coca-Cola and Nestle Refreshments, the previous name of Beverage Partners Worldwide
- Computable Cross Norm/Realignment (CCNR) Criterion in quantum physics
