= Douglas Daft =

Australian businessman (born 1943)

- Born: 20 March 1943 (age 83); Cessnock, New South Wales
- Education: Vaucluse Boys' High School; University of New England; University of New South Wales

Douglas Neville Daft AC (born 20 March 1943 in Cessnock, New South Wales) is an Australian businessman.

He graduated from the University of New England in Armidale, New South Wales in 1963 with a Bachelor of Arts degree, majoring in Mathematics. While at the University of New England he lived at Robb College. During the 1960s he taught science at Vaucluse Boys' High School in Sydney. In 1970 he graduated from the University of New South Wales with a Diploma of Admin. He was CEO of Coca-Cola (2000–2004). In 2005, he was appointed Companion of the Order of Australia (AC) for his leadership in the global business community.

Business positions
Preceded by Douglas Ivester	CEO of The Coca-Cola Company; 2000–2004	Succeeded by E. Neville Isdell
Preceded by Douglas Ivester	Chairman of The Coca-Cola Company; 2000–2004	Succeeded by E. Neville Isdell
