= James Quincey =

British businessman in the United States (born 1965)

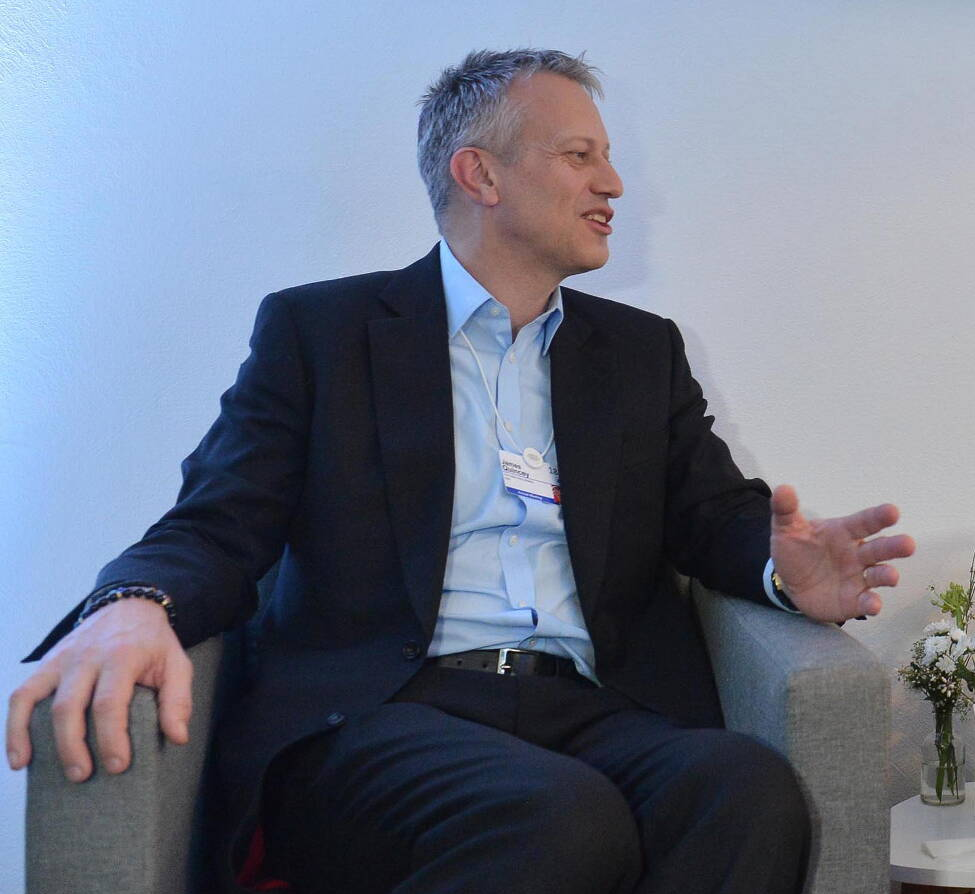
- Quincey in 2018
- Born: James Robert Quincey; 8 January 1965 (age 61); London, England, UK
- Education: University of Liverpool (BSc)
- Title: Executive Chairman, The Coca-Cola Company
- Predecessor: Muhtar Kent
- Spouse: Jacqui Quincey
- Children: 2

James Robert B. Quincey (born 8 January 1965) is a British businessman based in the United States. After starting his career at Bain & Co, he joined The Coca-Cola Company in 1996 and was later named chief operating officer (COO). He became the chief executive officer (CEO) in 2017 and the chairman of the board in 2019.

== Early life ==
James Robert B. Quincey was born on 8 January 1965 in London, England, UK and lived in Hanover, New Hampshire, US for three years when his father was a lecturer in biochemistry at Dartmouth College. By age five, they had moved to Birmingham, England. He attended private King Edward's School, Birmingham and has a bachelor's degree in electronic engineering from the University of Liverpool. He is fluent in Spanish.

== Career ==
=== Joining Coca-Cola ===
After working with Bain & Co and a smaller consultancy, he joined Coca-Cola in 1996. With Coke, he has lived in Latin America and worked in Mexico, where he led the acquisition of Jugos del Valle. In 2015, Quincey became the president of Coca-Cola. He outlined a plan to have five category clusters for brands in the company. He also changed management and the entire Coke hierarchy.

=== Chairman and CEO ===
Quincey in a discussion about plastic pollution. Video from World Economic Forum.

He was named CEO in December 2016. He became CEO the following May when Muhtar Kent retired. Among his first acts as CEO, he announced reducing 1,200 corporate positions as part of a plan to invest in new products and marketing and restore the year's revenue and profit growth from four to six percent. Quincey also said in interviews that he wanted to rid the Coke company's culture of over-cautiousness concerning risk, and that he intended to further diversify Coke's portfolio by accelerating investments in startup businesses. He later launched a plan to recycle a bottle for every bottle sold by 2030. On 24 April 2019, Quincey was elected chairman of the board. In December 2021 Quincey announced the planned discontinuation of many of its slower selling products, such as Tab and Zico coconut water.

In 2023, Quincey's total compensation from Coca-Cola was $24.7 million, or 1,799 times the median employee pay at Coca-Cola for that year.

In 2025, Quincey gifted President Donald Trump with the Coca-Cola company's first custom Diet Coke bottle to honor his inauguration.

On 10 December 2025, it was announced that Quincey will step down as chief executive officer and will be succeeded by chief operating officer Henrique Braun, effective 31 March 2026. Quincey will then transition to the role of executive chairman.

== Personal life ==
Quincey and his wife Jacqui have two children and live in London, UK.

Business positions
Preceded by Muhtar Kent	Chair of The Coca-Cola Company; April 2019–Incumbent	Incumbent
Preceded by Muhtar Kent	CEO of The Coca-Cola Company; December 2016–March 2026	Succeeded by Henrique Braun
