= Henrique Braun =

American businessman (born 1968)

- Born: 1968 (age 57–58); California, United States
- Citizenship: American; Brazilian
- Education: Federal Rural University of Rio de Janeiro (BA); Michigan State University (MS); Georgia State University (MBA)
- Title: Chief Executive Officer, The Coca-Cola Company
- Predecessor: James Quincey

Henrique Braun (born 1968) is an American–Brazilian businessman and has been chief executive officer of The Coca-Cola Company since March 31, 2026.

== Early life and education ==
Braun was born in California and raised in Brazil. He holds a bachelor's degree in agricultural engineering from the Federal Rural University of Rio de Janeiro, a Master of Science degree from Michigan State University and a master of business administration from Georgia State University.

== Career ==
In 1996, Braun joined Coca-Cola, having served in numerous roles since then. He was the company's President for Greater China and South Korea from 2013 to 2016. He then served as President of the Brazil business unit from 2016 to 2020 and as the President of the Latin America operating unit from 2020 to 2022.

Braun was president of international development from 2023 to 2024. On January 1, 2025, he became executive vice president and chief operating officer.

Announced on 10 December 2025; he became chief executive officer of Coca-Cola, effective March 31, 2026, succeeding James Quincey.

Business positions
Preceded by James Quincey	CEO of The Coca-Cola Company; 2026–present	Incumbent
