= Muhtar Kent =

Turkish-American business executive (born 1952)

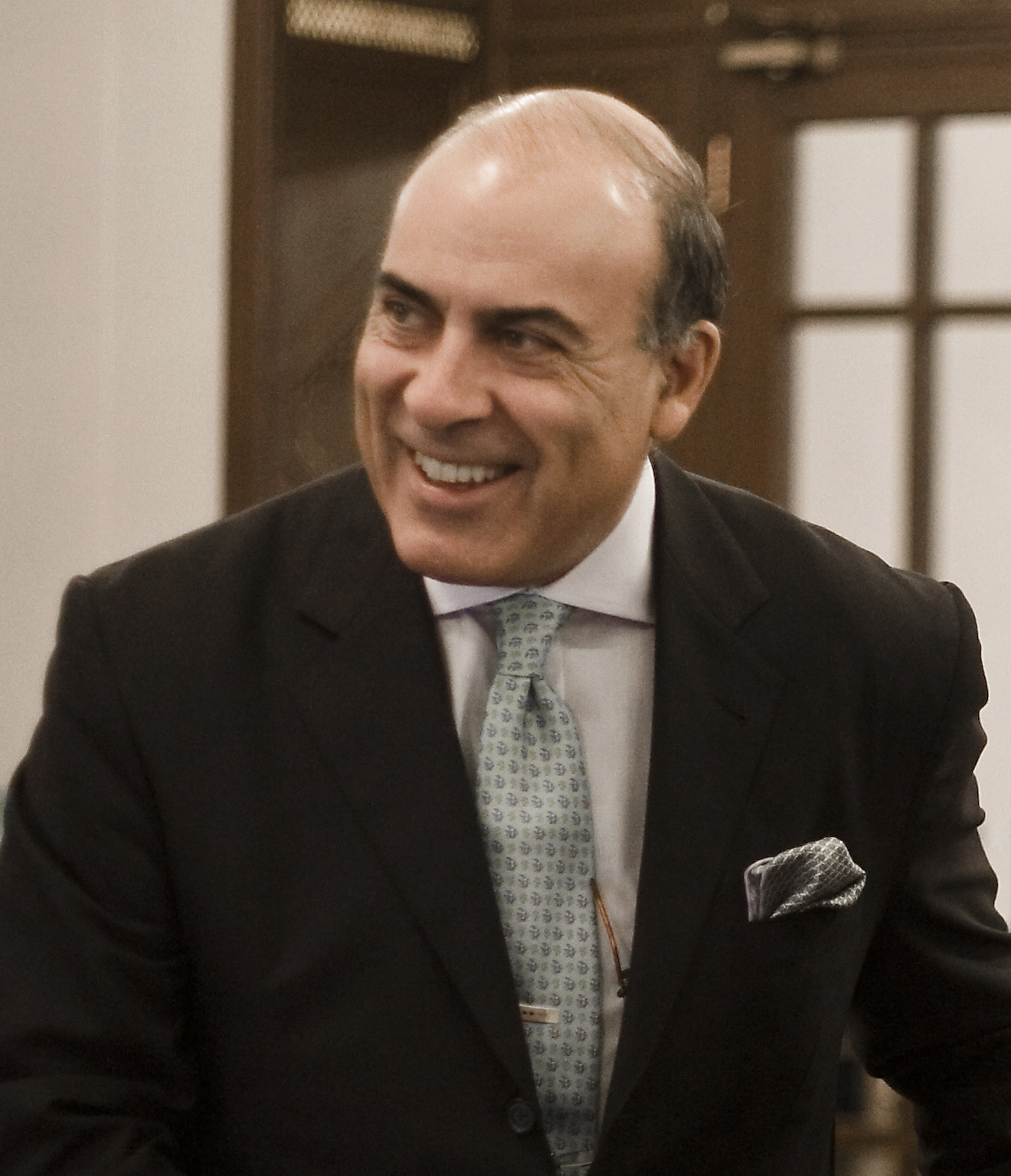
- Kent in 2009
- Born: Ahmet Muhtar Kent; December 1, 1952 (age 73); New York City, U.S.
- Education: English High School for Boys; Tarsus American College
- Alma mater: University of Hull (BA); City University, London (MBA)
- Predecessor: E. Neville Isdell
- Relatives: Necdet Kent (Father)

Ahmet Muhtar Kent (born December 1, 1952) is a Turkish-American business executive. He was the chairman and chief executive officer (CEO) of The Coca-Cola Company. He became CEO in 2008, and chairman in 2009, leaving those positions in 2016 and 2019 respectively. Kent is a member of Galatasaray Sports Club, number 14277.

== Early life ==
Kent was born in 1952 in New York City, where his father, Necdet Kent, was the consul-general of Turkey. After completed his middle school education at English High School for Boys in 1968 before graduating from Tarsus American College in Mersin, Turkey, in 1971. After finishing high school, he moved to the UK to study at the University of Hull and later earned an MBA degree from Cass Business School in London.

== Professional career ==
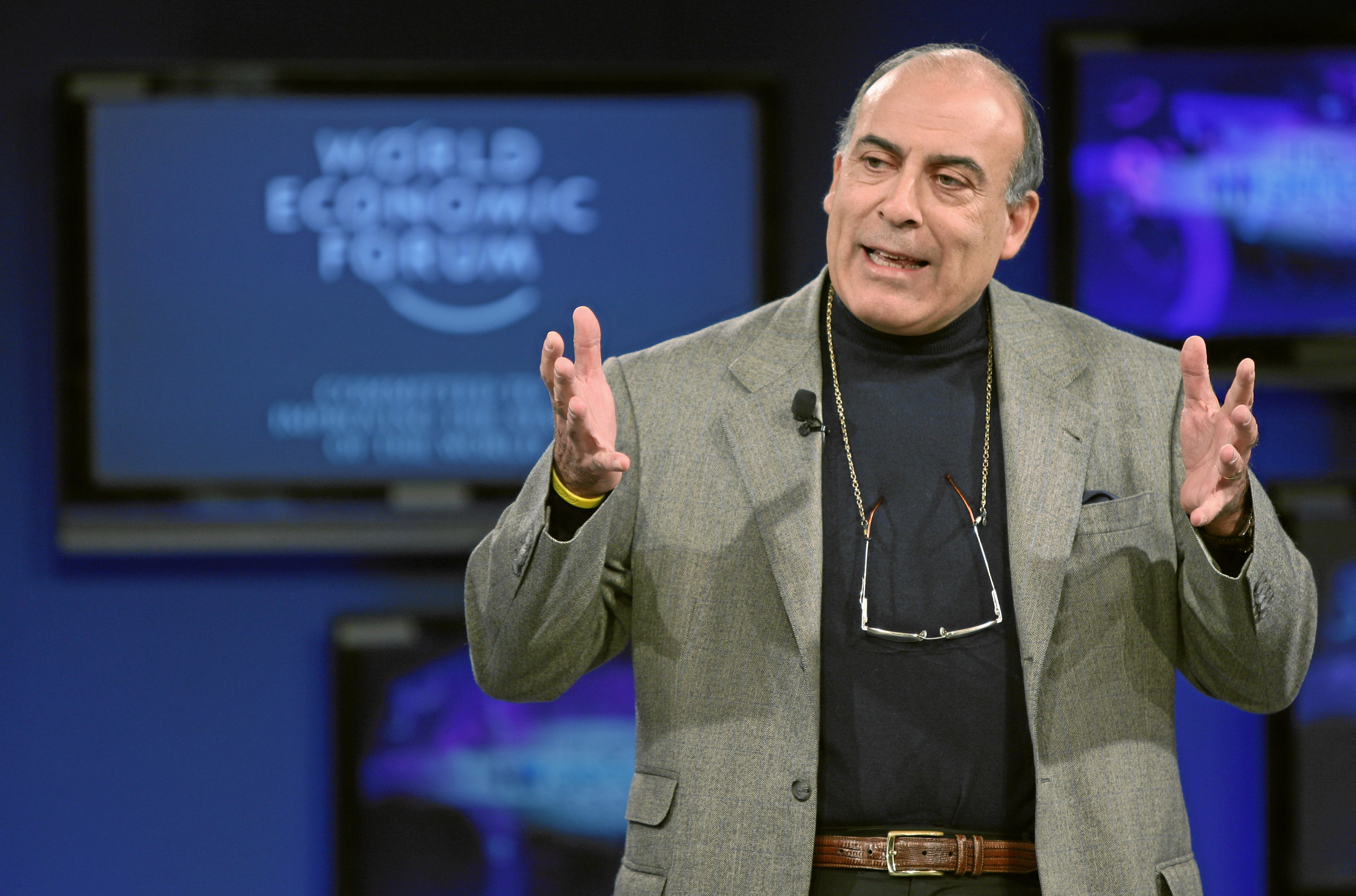
Kent at the World Economic Forum in Davos, 2010

=== 1978–1999 ===
Kent found a job at the Coca-Cola Company in Turkey through a newspaper ad in 1978. He toured the country in trucks to sell Coca-Cola, and thereby learned its distribution, marketing and logistics systems.

In 1985, he was promoted to the general manager position of Coca-Cola Turkey and Central Asia, and transferred the headquarters of the company from İzmir to Istanbul. Three years later, he was appointed president of the company's East Central Europe Division, responsible for 23 countries in a region from the Alps to the Himalayas. Living in Vienna, Austria, he served at this post until 1995.

Promoted further, Muhtar Kent became in 1995 managing director of Coca-Cola Amatil-Europe. In two years, he increased the turnover of the company about 50%, which covered bottling operations in 12 European countries.

=== 1999–2005 ===
In 1999, Kent left the Coca-Cola Company after 20 years. Returning to Turkey, Kent became CEO of Efes Beverage Group at Anadolu Group, the largest local shareholder of the Coca-Cola franchise in Turkey and one of Europe's largest beverage businesses. He extended the company's territory from Serbia to Pakistan.

One issue concerns his personal ethics. In 1996, Kent was judged guilty of insider trading in civil court in Australia, where he held a senior-level position at Coca-Cola Amatil Ltd., a regional bottler based in Sydney. He was required not only to give up the profit he made of $324,000, but also pay $30,000 to cover the cost of an investigation by the Australian Securities Commission. Kent has since claimed that his then financial adviser sold short some 100,000 shares of the company on Kent's behalf a mere hours before the profit announcement. In the event, the Australian controversy continued to dog him because two years later - in 1998 - Kent resigned from Coca-Cola Amatil-Europe.

=== 2005–present ===
In May 2005, Kent rejoined Coca-Cola after almost six years and was appointed president and chief operating officer of the company's North Asia, Eurasia and Middle East group, a position reporting directly to chairman and chief executive officer Neville Isdell. Muhtar Kent's rise continued and he was promoted in January 2006, to the newly created position of president of international operations. In this capacity, he was responsible for all operations outside of North America, and all group presidents outside of North America reported to him.

Kent was named chief executive officer (CEO), effective July 1, 2008. He became chairman of the company almost a year later, on April 23, 2009. By 2015, it was reported he was paid $25 million a year by the Coca-Cola Company.

Kent is co-chair of the Consumer Goods Forum, a fellow of the Foreign Policy Association, a member of the Business Roundtable, a past chairman of the US-China Business Council, and current chairman emeritus of the US-ASEAN Business Council. He was appointed as a member of the Eminent Persons Group for ASEAN by President Obama and Secretary of State Clinton. He serves on the boards of Special Olympics International, Ronald McDonald House Charities, Catalyst and Emory University. He received an honorary doctorate from Oglethorpe University in 2008.

He serves on the board of directors of the American Turkish Society and the National Committee on United States-China Relations.

He is an invitee of the Bilderberg Group and attended the Greece 2009 Bilderberg conference at the Astir Palace resort in Vouliagmeni, Greece.

In May 2014, Kent was awarded an honorary degree by the Georgia Institute of Technology.

In December 2016, Coca-Cola announced that Kent would step down as CEO in May 2017, to be replaced by president and COO James Quincey. Kent continued as the company's chairman. He stepped down as chairman in April 2019.

In 2016, he was inducted as a Georgia Trustee, an honor given by the Georgia Historical Society in conjunction with the Governor of Georgia to individuals whose accomplishments and community service reflect the ideals of the founding body of Trustees, which governed the Georgia colony from 1732 to 1752.

In 2016, Kent was mentioned as a possible running mate for Hillary Clinton during the 2016 U.S. presidential election.

Business positions
Preceded by E. Neville Isdell	CEO of The Coca-Cola Company; 2008–2018	Succeeded by James Quincey
Preceded by E. Neville Isdell	Chairman of The Coca-Cola Company; 2009–2018	Succeeded by James Quincey
