= Nestea =

Iced tea brand

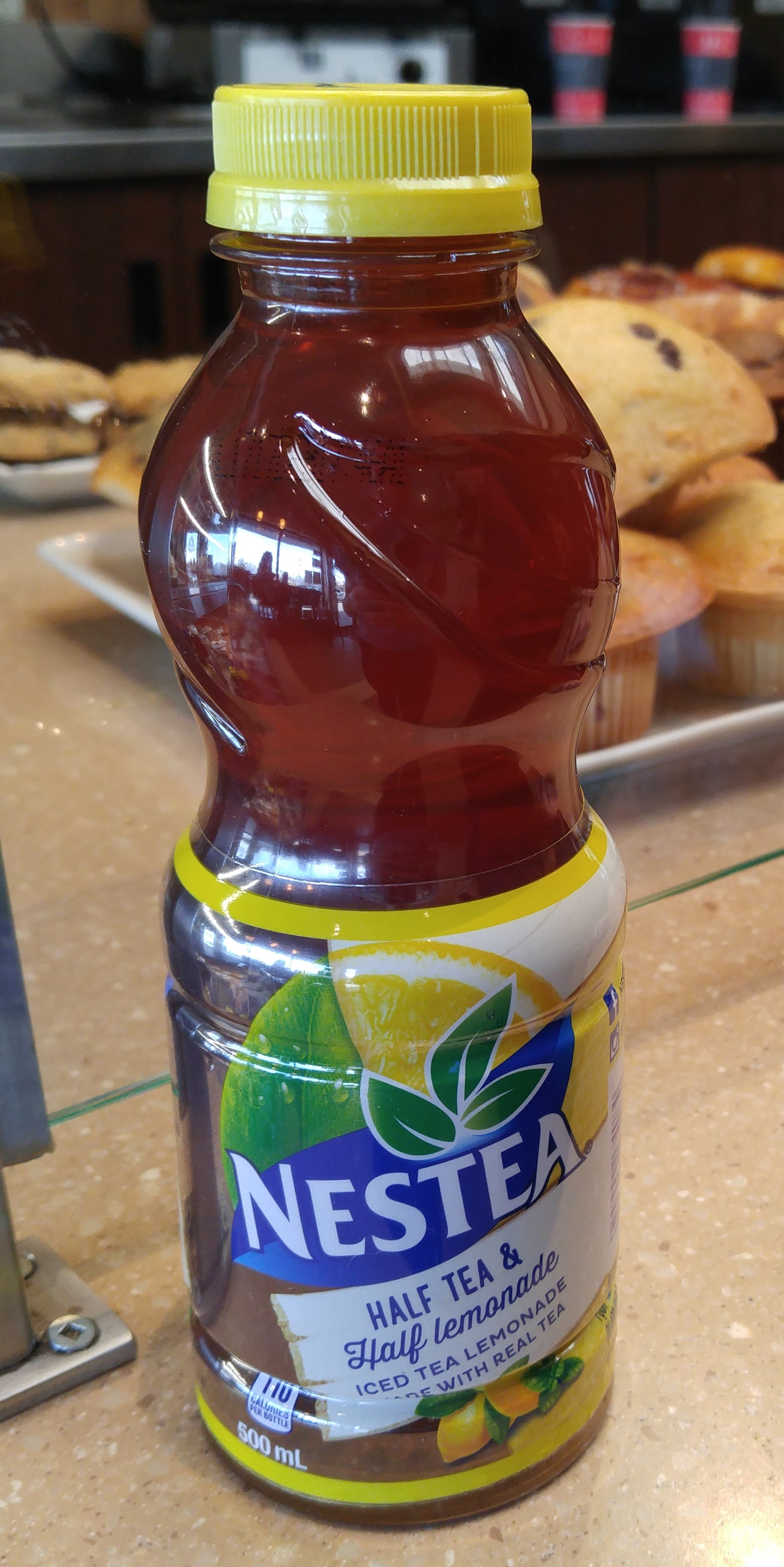
- Type: Iced tea
- Manufacturer: Nestlé
- Distributor: Maspex (Central and Eastern Europe); S.A. Damm (Spain and Andorra); Keurig Dr. Pepper (Canada)
- Origin: Switzerland
- Introduced: 1948; 78 years ago
- Website: www.nestle.com/brands/allbrands/nestea

Nestea is a Swiss brand of iced tea and other beverages owned by Nestlé, Nestea provides a variety of tea products, including liquid and powdered tea concentrates, refrigeratable teas, and ready-to-drink bottles dispensed by vendor or vending machine. The beverage comes in several flavors, depending on the country. It competes with Lipton Teas and Infusions Lipton Iced Tea and The Coca-Cola Company's Fuze Beverage.

== History ==
Nestea was introduced in the US by Nestle in 1948 as a soluble tea, "manufactured in the same way as Nescafé". After 1991, it was manufactured worldwide by Beverage Partners Worldwide (BPW), a joint venture between Nestlé & The Coca-Cola Company, and in the United States by The Coca-Cola Company. Since the start of 2017, Nestlé and Coca-Cola have agreed to end the iced tea Nestea joint venture after 16 years of collaboration. One of the reasons for this was that Coca-Cola and Nestlé wanted to pursue different strategies in a rapidly changing market, with Nestlé handling the distribution of Nestea in most countries, except Andorra, Bulgaria, Canada, Portugal, Romania, Serbia and Spain, where Coca-Cola Company retained a license.

In 2019, S.Trek Logistics Ltd. took over distribution in Malta. In the same year, Nestle rebranded Nestea as a natural product. The new recipe, launched by Nestlé after the end of the joint venture, no longer contains artificial colors and flavors, corn syrup or GMO ingredients. In addition, Nestea ready-to-drink iced tea is made with stevia extract and can be found in different flavors, such as lemon, raspberry and peach. The new recipe sources its tea leaves from Nilgiri, Sri Lanka, Kenya and Indonesia. At the beginning of 2020, Maspex took over distribution of Nestea in Central and Eastern Europe, including Hungary, Romania and Poland.

Coca-Cola's remaining regional rights to Nestea expired at the end of 2024; production and distribution was licensed to Keurig Dr. Pepper in Canada, S.A. Damm and Ahembo in Spain, Andorra and Gibraltar, while Nestlé took distribution in-house in Portugal. Coca-Cola rebranded its Nestea products in Canada as Fuze Tea, maintaining the same formulations it used for Nestea.

== See also ==
- Lipton
- Nestea Beach Volleyball
