= Enviga =

Carbonated canned green tea drink

- Type: Canned sparkling green tea
- Manufacturer: Beverage Partners Worldwide (North America)
- Origin: United States
- Introduced: 2006

Enviga was a carbonated canned green-tea drink. Enviga is a trademark of Beverage Partners Worldwide, a joint venture between The Coca-Cola Company and Nestlé. It was available in three flavors: Green Tea, Tropical Pomegranate, and Mixed Berry. According to Coca-Cola, Enviga burns 60 to 100 calories per three 12-oz.(330 ml) cans due to its high EGCG and caffeine content. The makers of the drink were sued for making fraudulent health claims about weight loss, and agreed to settle and cease repeating them. By 2008 the drink was practically removed from the market.

== Nutritional facts ==
A can of Enviga has 5 calories, 100 mg of caffeine, 35 mg of sodium, and 20% of the daily recommended calcium based on a 2,000 calorie diet. It is sweetened with aspartame and has no carbohydrates, fat, or protein.

== Lawsuits over health claims ==
In February 2007, the watchdog group Center for Science in the Public Interest (CSPI) filed a lawsuit over company claims that Enviga acts as a calorie-burning and weight-loss product, as a "negative calorie" drink. The group claims that if Coca-Cola and Nestlé stop marketing the product as a calorie-burner, they would drop possible litigation. The beverage makers responded that they have deliberately avoided claims that Enviga is a weight-loss product, and that there exists independent research to substantiate the effects of the product. The watchdog group alleged that it was only a three-day study, and that it was only presented in a conference by the Obesity Society, the editors of journal Obesity, where their conclusions were rejected. The lack of validity of the study was later referred to by the Attorney General in the settlement. Studies on the combination of caffeine and green tea anti-oxidant have given mixed results, and the results are not conclusive.

The State of Connecticut also investigated the calorie-burning qualities of the drink. The State Attorney General, Richard Blumenthal, demanded all scientific research associated with its calorie-burning qualities.

In February 2009 the companies made a settlement with Connecticut Attorney General Richard Blumenthal, affecting several US states. They agreed to pay $650,000 to the states, remove any claims about weight loss, and add disclaimers that weight loss can only occur via diet and exercise. According to the US Federal News Service, the settlement requires that "any marketing of Enviga, or a similarly formulated beverage, that uses the terms 'the calorie burner,' 'negative calories,' 'drink negative,' or makes any claims explicitly or implicitly that consumers will burn calories by drinking Enviga, there must be a clear and conspicuous disclosure that the product does not produce weight loss without diet and exercise."

In 2010, a US court of appeals did not allow a woman to sue Coca-Cola for weight-loss false advertising, and CSPI reported that it would not appeal the decision. CSPI said that the sales of Enviga had collapsed after its 2009 settlement, and that it had already met its goal of informing customers about the lack of efficacy of the beverage. CSPI announced that it was suing Coca-Cola again, but this time for its new beverage Vitaminwater.

== Sales ==
As reported in the Sydney Morning Herald, flavoured bottled water, sports drinks and teas, are increasing sales with the decline in sales of sugary soft drinks – with cold tea the fastest growing non-carbonated beverage category in the U.S. during the first half of 2006. Prior to launch, Coke had been trailing and losing market share in this sector to Pepsi, AriZona and Snapple.

== Flavors ==
Discontinued:

- Berry
- Pomegranate
- Peach

Since the brand's inception, and the launch of the three original flavors, peach was the first to be dropped in favor of pomegranate as the third flavor.

== See also ==
- List of energy drinks
