= J. Paul Austin =

American businessman

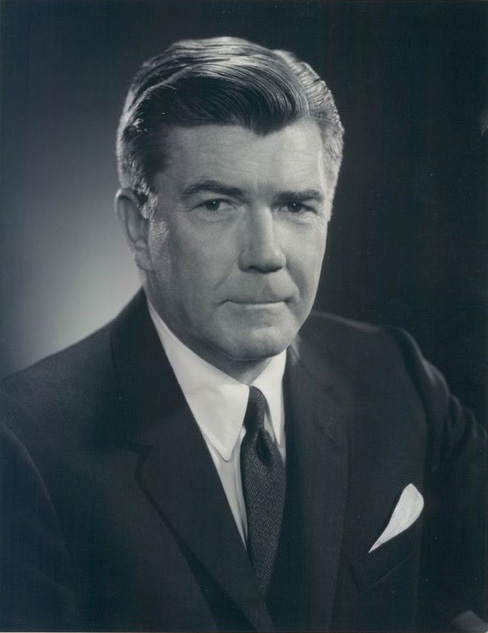
- Born: February 14, 1915; LaGrange, Georgia, United States
- Died: December 26, 1985 (aged 70); Atlanta, Georgia, United States
- Education: Harvard University (BA, LLB)
- Known for: President, CEO and Chairman of The Coca-Cola Company (1962–1981)

John Paul Austin (February 14, 1915 – December 26, 1985) was Chairman, President and CEO of The Coca-Cola Company. From 1962 to 1981 Austin oversaw the growth of the company from $567 million in sales to a $5.9 billion global force.

== Early life ==
John Paul Austin was born on February 14, 1915, in LaGrange, Georgia. His father was an executive at Callaway Mills. Austin was educated at Culver Military Academy in Culver, Indiana and Phillips Academy in Andover, Massachusetts.

Austin attended Harvard University for undergraduate studies and graduated in 1937 with a degree in Liberal Arts. While at Harvard he was a member of the rowing team and competed in the 1936 Summer Olympics in Berlin. Austin graduated from Harvard Law School in 1940.

During World War II Austin was a Naval Intelligence Officer. He served on a PT squadron in the Pacific and was uninjured in the friendly fire incident involving PT-346 in April 1944. Austin achieved the rank of lieutenant commander and received the Legion of Merit.

== Career with Coca-Cola ==
=== Early career ===
Paul Austin was working at the New York law firm of Larkin, Rathbone & Perry when he joined the legal department at Coca-Cola in 1949. Austin began in Chicago where he supervised the buying of bottling plants. He spent five months working at various positions in the plant and as a route salesman. To Austin, this was a path to success in the business.

In Chicago, Austin met Jeane Weed, who was working for Coca-Cola as a secretary. They married in July 1950 and had two sons.

In 1950 Austin was named assistant to the president of the Coca-Cola Export Corporation. In 1954 Austin moved to Johannesburg, South Africa to oversee Coca-Cola's operations in Africa, serving as vice president of the export unit. In 1958 Austin returned to Georgia and was named executive vice president of the Coca-Cola Export Corporation, then president in 1959. In May 1961 Austin was elected executive vice president of The Coca-Cola Company.

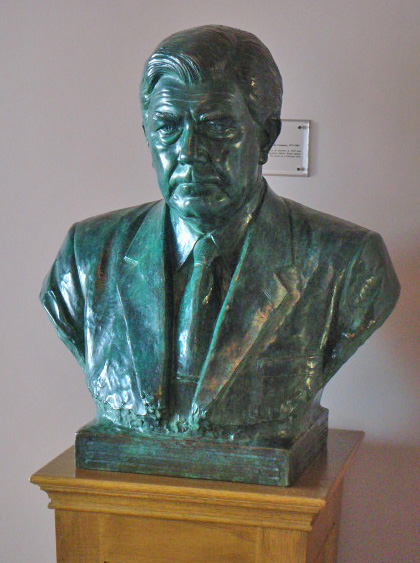
Bust of J. Paul Austin at Coca-Cola's headquarters in Atlanta

=== President, CEO and Chairman of Coca-Cola ===
In May 1962 Paul Austin was elected president of Coca-Cola, succeeding Lee Talley. He became chief executive officer in 1966, and chairman in 1970. Austin retired from Coca-Cola in 1981 and was succeeded by Roberto Goizueta.

With Austin at the helm, Coca-Cola achieved an unprecedented tenfold growth. Coca-Cola had earnings of $46.7 million on sales of $567 million in 1962 when Austin was elected president. When Austin retired, Coca-Cola had earnings of $481 million on sales of $5.9 billion.

Under Austin's leadership, Coca-Cola's advertisements and branding had global impact. The groundbreaking "Hilltop" commercial featuring "I'd Like to Buy the World a Coke" was released in 1971 and has had a long lasting connection with the public.

=== Expansion of Coca-Cola worldwide ===
Paul Austin grew Coca-Cola's export markets dramatically, bringing the soft drink to countries that often did not have amicable relations with the United States. Austin brought Fanta Orange to the Soviet Union, ending Pepsi's brief monopoly there. Through meetings with Egyptian President Anwar Sadat, Austin helped restore operations in Egypt after a 12-year boycott. Austin brought Coca-Cola back into Portugal after a 50-year ban on the drink. Austin also brought Coca-Cola to Yemen and Sudan.

Amidst the international expansion, India was the only country to cast out Coca-Cola. In 1977 exports to India stopped because Coca-Cola refused to divulge its secret recipe to the Indian government.

==== China ====
In December 1978 Austin announced Coca-Cola would return to China after a 30-year ban. Austin had been working with Chinese officials since 1975 to secure Coca-Cola's return. In a January 1979 article in People magazine, Austin stated that to bring Coca-Cola back to mainland China, "[a]ll it took was patience." Austin continued,

My attitude was not pushy ... but to say that in the normal course of events it would be most likely that they would enter foreign trade. And when they did, the way to signal it to the world at large was to bring Coca-Cola in—as the symbol of U.S. foreign trade.

The announcement came just a few days after President Carter announced the normalization of relations between the United States and China, though Coca-Cola insisted there was no link.

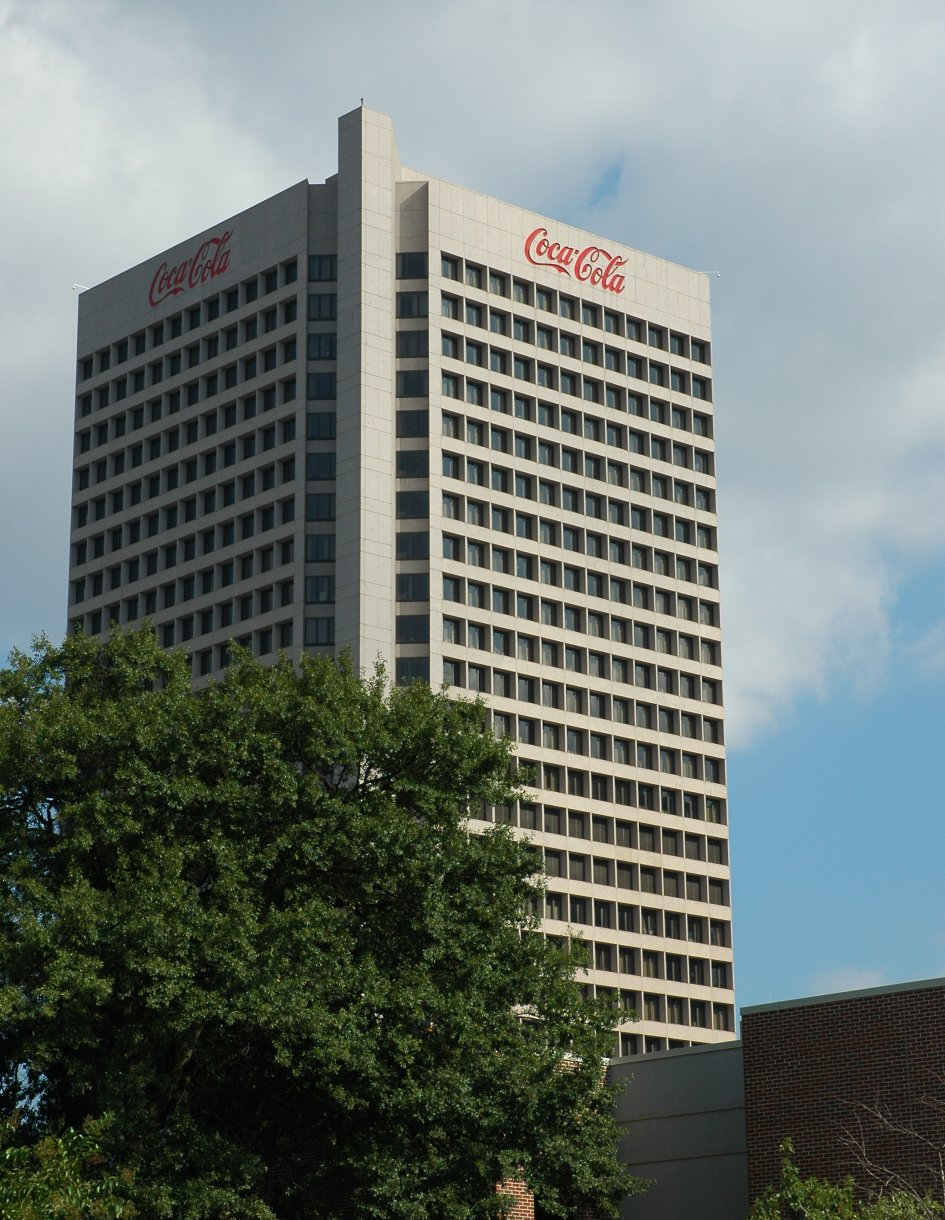
The Coca-Cola Company's headquarters building in Atlanta

=== Coca-Cola Headquarters Building ===
Paul Austin supervised the planning of Coca-Cola's headquarters building in Atlanta, Georgia. The 26-story building on North Avenue opened in 1979.

Austin's wife Jeane influenced the interior look of the building, decorating it with artwork she found during her husband's business travels. Jeane also offered design suggestions that were incorporated into the executive floors. The tapestry Jeane commissioned still hangs in the lobby.

=== Wine ===
Coca-Cola briefly entered the wine business in the late 1970s. In 1977 Austin helped to create the Wine Spectrum, a subsidiary of Coca-Cola that consisted of Sterling Vineyards, Monterey Vineyard and the Taylor Wine Company. In 1983 the Wine Spectrum was acquired by Joseph E. Seagram & Sons for more than $200 million in cash.

== Politics and personal causes ==
=== Civil rights ===
Paul Austin was an active supporter of Martin Luther King Jr. After King won the 1964 Nobel Peace Prize, plans for an interracial celebration in still-segregated Atlanta were not initially well supported by the city's business elite until Austin intervened. In his memoir, activist and former Atlanta mayor Andrew Young wrote:

J. Paul Austin, the chairman and CEO of Coca-Cola, and Mayor Ivan Allen summoned key Atlanta business leaders to the Commerce Club's eighteenth floor dining room, where Austin told them flatly, "It is embarrassing for Coca-Cola to be located in a city that refuses to honor its Nobel Prize winner. We are an international business. The Coca-Cola Co. does not need Atlanta. You all need to decide whether Atlanta needs the Coca-Cola Co." Within two hours of the end of that meeting, every ticket to the dinner was sold.

Coretta Scott King thought of Austin as a good friend. Austin was the first recipient of the Martin Luther King Jr. Center for Nonviolent Social Change's award for corporate social responsibility. Three years later, in 1977, Austin and Mrs. King were awarded the annual Man of Conscience award of the Appeal of Conscience Foundation.

=== Election of Jimmy Carter ===
Governor Jimmy Carter was not well known outside of Georgia when Paul Austin gave him his personal and professional support during the 1976 presidential election. In addition to contributing money to Carter's campaign, Austin lent Carter the use of Coca-Cola's corporate plane. Austin also introduced Carter to influential New York businessmen including David Rockefeller.

After Carter was elected there was wide speculation that Austin would be offered a Cabinet position. Austin did not have a Cabinet position, but served an outside advisory role.

=== Cuba and Castro ===
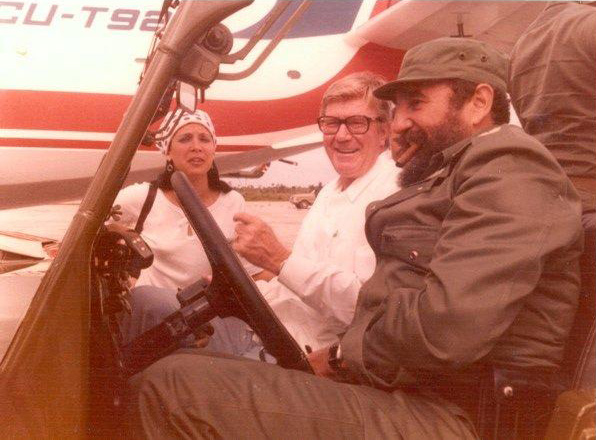
J. Paul Austin and Fidel Castro in Cuba

In 1977 and 1978 Paul Austin had a series of private meetings with Fidel Castro in Cuba. The meetings were ostensibly for Coca-Cola business – Coca-Cola had a $27.5 million claim against Cuba for confiscating its properties in 1961.

Because of Austin's close relationship with President Carter these meetings were also a way to create a dialogue about American-Cuban relations.

In his White House diary President Jimmy Carter wrote:

I wanted Paul, as a private citizen, to investigate with Castro the prospects of moving more actively towards reconciliation between the U.S. and Cuba.

The Austin-Castro-Carter relationship and its link to sugar pricing was the subject of a July 1977 column by William Safire in The New York Times. Playing off of Coca-Cola's slogan, Safire wrote, "The Carter-Coke-Castro sugar diplomacy is not merely a potential conflict of interest. It's the real thing."

=== Environmentalism ===
Paul Austin was a champion for the environment and launched a series of environmental initiatives while at Coca-Cola. These included water purification programs and glass bottle recycling machines.

Austin's April 1970 speech to the Georgia Bankers Association entitled "Environmental Renewal or Oblivion – Quo Vadis?" was entered into the Senate Congressional Record by United States Senator Edmund Muskie. In it Austin, as head of Coca-Cola, accepted responsibility for the corporation's effects on the environment and pledged to offset them with Coca-Cola-sponsored programs. He spoke passionately about preserving the environment for future generations:

The youth of this country know what the stakes are. They're upset. And they're indignant over our apparent unconcern. Whole student populations are engaging in protests and demonstrations against those who compound their transgressions of pollution with an abysmal ignorance of man's responsibility to his environment. Why? Because it's their world we're wasting. And, to put it mildly, they don't like it a bit!

== Personal and family life ==
Paul Austin served on a number of other executive boards including SunTrust, General Electric, Dow Jones & Company, Morgan Guaranty Trust, Continental Oil and Federated Department Stores. Austin was chairman of the board of trustees of the RAND Corporation from 1972 to 1981. He was a member of the Trilateral Commission and the Council on Foreign Relations.

In 1977, Austin received the Golden Plate Award of the American Academy of Achievement.

Austin was an avid golfer and was a chairman of the tournament policy board of the Professional Golfers' Association of America (PGA). He belonged to a number of the world's top golf clubs including Augusta National, Scotland's Royal and Ancient Golf Club of St Andrews and Cypress Point Club in Pebble Beach, California.

From 1958 onward the Austins made their home in the Buckhead community of Atlanta.

Paul and Jeane Austin had two sons, Jock and Sam, and eight grandchildren.
