= Douglas Ivester =

American businessman

- Born: Melvin Douglas Ivester; 1947 (age 78–79); New Holland, Georgia, U.S.
- Education: University of Georgia (BBA)
- Known for: Chairman & CEO of The Coca-Cola Company (1997–2000)

Melvin Douglas Ivester (born 1947) is an American businessman. He served as the chairman and chief executive officer of The Coca-Cola Company from 1997 to 2000.

== Early life ==
Ivester was born in New Holland, Georgia. He attended New Holland Elementary School, where he met Kay Grindle in the third grade. He grew up to marry her. He attended North Hall High School and went on to the University of Georgia, where he earned a degree in accounting, graduating with honors in 1969 from the university's Terry College of Business.

== Career ==
Ivester began his career with the accounting firm of Ernst and Ernst.

In 1979, Ivester joined Coca-Cola as assistant controller and director of corporate auditing, and in 1981 he became the youngest vice president in the company's history. Two years later he was elected senior vice president of finance, and in 1985 he was elected CFO at the age of 37. Ivester was elected chairman of the board and chief executive officer of The Coca-Cola Company on October 23, 1997. Ivester received a retirement package estimated to be worth $166 million. Ivester received the FIFA Order of Merit in 1996.

Ivester serves on the board of directors of SunTrust Bank, now Truist Financial.

In 1996, Ivester was honored with an Edison Achievement Award for his commitment to innovation throughout his career.

In 1999, he earned a Horatio Alger Award for his achievements and pursuit of education despite adversity.

In 2025, Ivester earned an honorary doctorate from the University of Georgia including for his notable support of the university, for his assistance to, and development of, "thousands" of students, and for his professional successes.

== Philanthropy ==
Ivester has made important contributions to the University of Georgia. Notable have been the 2026 donation to the Terry College of Business for the M. Douglas & V. Kay Ivester Institute for Business Analytics and Insights and the Executive-at-Large initiative, the "Deer Run Fellows" program.

Ivester also contributed a $20.5 million endowment to the University of Georgia's School of Nursing in April 2026, which will be named after his wife, Victoria Kay Ivester.

Ivester's philanthropy has also benefitted Hall County, Georgia with contributions to the arts, education, community development and parks.

Business positions
Preceded by Roberto Goizueta	CEO of The Coca-Cola Company; 1997–2000	Succeeded by Douglas Daft
Preceded by Roberto Goizueta	Chairman of The Coca-Cola Company; 1997–2000	Succeeded by Douglas Daft
