= Roberto Goizueta =

Cuban-American business executive (1931–1997)

- Born: Roberto Críspulo Goizueta Cantera; November 18, 1931; Havana, Cuba
- Died: October 18, 1997 (aged 65); Atlanta, Georgia, U.S.
- Known for: CEO/Chairman of Coca-Cola (1980–1997)

Roberto Críspulo Goizueta Cantera (November 18, 1931 – October 18, 1997) was a Cuban-born American business executive who served as the chairman, president, and chief executive officer (CEO) of The Coca-Cola Company from August 1980 until his death in October 1997.

== Early life ==
Goizueta was born on November 18, 1931, in Havana, Cuba. He was the only son of Críspulo Goizueta and Aída Cantera. His grandparents on both sides of his family had emigrated from the Basque Country to Cuba in the late 19th century. His mother's father, Marcelo Cantera, owned a portion of a profitable, local sugar mill. His father, Críspulo, was an architect and a real estate investor who inherited Cantera's sugar interests. Goizueta attended Colegio de Belén in Havana, a Jesuit secondary school and later studied for a year in the United States at the Cheshire Academy, a preparatory school in Connecticut. He graduated from Yale University with a bachelor's degree in chemical engineering in 1953.

== Career ==
Goizueta returned to Cuba to work in his family's business in 1953. A year later, Goizueta replied to a help wanted newspaper ad for a job with the Coca-Cola bottler in Cuba. A short time later, he was promoted to chief technical director of five Cuban bottling plants.

Fidel Castro rose to power in Cuba, transforming the island into a communist state. While on vacation in Miami, Goizueta and his family decided to defect to the United States. After defecting to the United States, he worked for The Coca-Cola Company in Miami. He was reassigned to Nassau, Bahamas as a chemist for the Caribbean region. In 1964, he was moved to the headquarters of the Coca-Cola Company in Atlanta, Georgia. At the age of 35, he became vice president of technical research and development. He remains the youngest person to hold this position at the company. In 1975, he was promoted to lead the legal and external affairs department.

He received an appointment in 1979, to become president of the Coca-Cola Company after the resignation of J. Lucian Smith, who was Coca-Cola's president from 1974 until 1979. In March 1981, he assumed the chairmanship after chairman J. Paul Austin (who was Coca-Cola's president from 1962 to 1971) retired. He remained at the helm of The Coca-Cola Company for 16 years until the time of his death, due to complications from lung cancer, in 1997. During his tenure, the Coca-Cola brand became the best-known trademark in the world. In 1982, he introduced Diet Coke, followed by Cherry Coke and the controversial New Coke, both in 1985; advertising slogans "Coke is it!", "You Can't Beat the Feeling" and "Always Coca-Cola". In 1982, Goizueta approved the purchase of Columbia Pictures, signaling Coca-Cola's intentions to branch out beyond the soft-drink business.

Goizueta also sat on the boards of directors for various companies, including SunTrust Banks, the Ford Motor Company, Sonat Inc and the Eastman Kodak Company. He was well known for his business rivalry with fellow businessman Roger Enrico, CEO of PepsiCo, during his tenure as Coke's CEO.

== Philanthropy ==
Roberto Goizueta established the Goizueta Foundation, with a goal to support educational and charity institutions in 1992. "The purpose of the Goizueta Foundation is to assist organizations that empower individuals and families through educational opportunities to improve the quality of their lives."

In 1994, after a $10 million gift from the Robert W. Woodruff Foundation, the Board of Trustees at Emory University in Atlanta, Georgia, named its business school after Roberto Goizueta.

In January 1999, the estate of Goizueta pledged $20 million to Emory University.

== Personal life ==
Goizueta married Olguita Casteleiro in Havana, Cuba. They had four children together.

== Death ==
A heavy smoker, Goizueta died on October 18, 1997, of lung cancer.

== Awards and honors ==
- 1980 – Goizueta named an Emory University trustee
- 1985 – Goizueta receives the Golden Plate Award of the American Academy of Achievement
- 1994 – Emory University changes the name of its business school to the Roberto C. Goizueta Business School
- 1996 – Chief Executive magazine names him Chief Executive of the Year

== See also ==
- List of Cubans

Business positions
Preceded by J. Lucian Smith	President of The Coca-Cola Company; 1979–1997	Succeeded by Douglas Ivester
Preceded by J. Paul Austin	Chairman of The Coca-Cola Company; 1981–1997	Succeeded by Douglas Ivester
