= Huiyuan Juice =

Juice producer company

China Huiyuan Juice Group Limited 中国汇源果汁集团有限公司

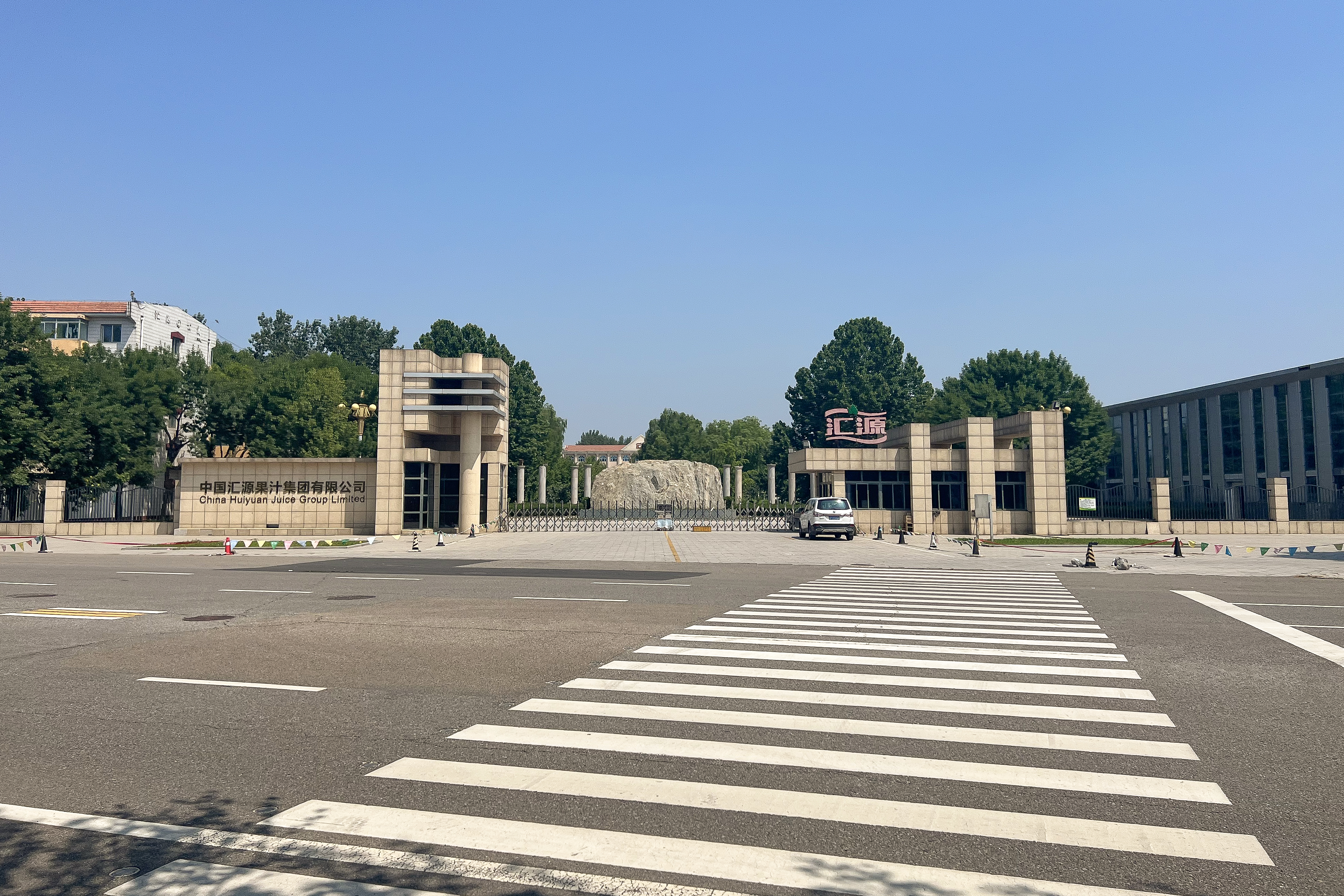
- Corporate headquarters
- Type: Listed company (delisted in 2018)
- Industry: Juice production
- Founded: 1992
- Founder: Zhu Xinli
- Headquarters: Beijing, People's Republic of China
- Area served: People's Republic of China
- Key people: Chairman: Zhu Xinli
- Website: China Huiyuan Juice Group Limited

China Huiyuan Juice Group Limited (Chinese: 中国汇源果汁集团有限公司; pinyin: Zhōngguó Huìyuán Guǒzhī Jítuán Yǒuxiàn Gōngsī) (SEHK: 1886), established in 1992 and headquartered in Beijing, is the largest privately owned juice producer in China. It is engaged in the manufacture and sales of juice and other beverage products. Its products include fruit juice and vegetable juice, nectars, bottled water, tea, and dairy drinks.

== Hong Kong listing ==
It was listed on the Hong Kong Stock Exchange in February 2007. Prior to its listing, Groupe Danone and Warburg Pincus became cornerstone investors in the company. Warburg Pincus sold its stake into the public market in 2009; Danone sold its 23 percent stake Huiyuan for €200m ($260m) in 2010 to Hong Kong private equity group, SAIF.

== Coca-Cola buy-out attempt ==
On 3 September 2008, Atlantic Industries, a wholly owned subsidiary of The Coca-Cola Company, agreed to buy China Huiyuan Juice for HK$17.9 billion at HK$12.20 per share, three times more than its closing price of HK$4.14 on the previous day. Its shares closed at HK$10.94 on that day. The proposed takeover was subject to anti-monopoly review by the Chinese Ministry of Commerce, which was scheduled to finish on 20 March 2009. On 17 March, it was reported that Coca-Cola was considering abandoning the deal, as Chinese authorities insisted on relinquishing the Huiyuan brand name after acquisition. On 18 March, the Ministry of Commerce disallowed the bid, citing market competition concerns.

Sun Min, wife of a Chinese businessman, was found guilty of insider trading in Huiyuan shares by the Market Misconduct Tribunal in Hong Kong. The businessman, Mo Feng, and Sun purchased 8.61 million shares in the company between 30 July and 29 August 2008, at between HK$3.78 and 4.66 (US$0.48–$0.60), then resold their shares HK$10.24–$11.12 (US$1.21–$1.43) each on 3–4 Sept. 2008, after Huiyuan's stock price had surged after the proposed takeover was announced. A profit of HK$55.1 million (US$7.09 million) was made from the trade. Sun was convicted of having dealt in 3.13 million Huiyuan shares in August 2008 and was fined HK$20 million (US$2.56 million), the largest ever imposed for the crime in the territory.
