= Beverage Partners Worldwide =

Former beverage company

- Formerly: Coca-Cola Nestlé Refreshments Company S.A. (1991-1994)
- Type: Joint venture
- Industry: Beverages
- Founded: 1991
- Defunct: 2018; 8 years ago
- Headquarters: Zurich, Switzerland
- Products: Nescafé, Nestea, Enviga
- Owner: The Coca-Cola Company; Nestlé
- Number of employees: 15-50

Beverage Partners Worldwide was a joint venture between The Coca-Cola Company and Nestlé with headquarters in Zurich, Switzerland. The venture was originally started in 1991 but was dissolved in 1994 due to organizational and distribution disputes. It was resurrected in 2001 before dissolving permanently in 2018. Their main products were Nescafé and Nestea.

== History ==
Coca-Cola Nestlé Refreshments Company S.A. was a 50:50 subsidiary between The Coca-Cola Company and Nestlé, initially established in 1991. In 1994, "disputes arose over distributors and distribution channels, top management compensation policies, a shift in focus from Nescafe to Nestea, etc." and the joint venture was temporarily slashed until it re-launched in 2001 as Beverage Partners Worldwide (BPW). In November 2006, BPW dropped the Nescafé brand and Nestlé reacquired it independently. In 2006, a new product, Enviga was launched. It claimed to "[boost] the body's metabolism and [help] to burn calories", a claim that concerned health advocates. The Center for Science in the Public Interest sued BPW in 2007 due to these claims and BPW was required to remove any references to weight loss benefits and calorie burning.

In 2010, Nestea debuted in India but was pulled in 2012 due to low interest. At this point, Nestea was only available in the United States, Europe, Canada, Taiwan, and Hong Kong. The same year, US distribution was delegated to Nestlé; Coca-Cola continued distributing abroad. Nestlé also retained the right to manufacture, distribute, and market Nestea as a powder and in vending machines, and Coca-Cola had control of Nestea in glass and PET bottles and cartons.

BPW worked with Coca-Cola bottling partners, such as Coca-Cola European Partners, Coca-Cola Hellenic Bottling, Coca-Cola Refreshments Canada, Coca-Cola Amatil, Swire Coca-Cola Taiwan, and Swire Beverages.

By 2017, Nestea was in 48 countries. In March of that year, Nestlé and Coca-Cola agreed to dissolve the BPW venture effective on January 1, 2018, in part because Nestlé wanted to expand Nestea on its own. In this agreement, Nestlé gave Coca-Cola the license to manufacture and distribute Nestea in Canada, Spain, Portugal, Andorra, Romania, Hungary, and Bulgaria.
