= Coca-Cola İçecek =

Anchor bottler and a part of the Coca-Cola System

Coca-Cola İçecek A.Ş
- Company type: Public
- Traded as: BİST: CCOLA
- Founded: 1964; 62 years ago (as İMSA); 2002; 24 years ago
- Headquarters: Istanbul, Turkey
- Key people: Burak Başarır (CEO); Tuncay Özilhan (Chairman)
- Products: Soft drinks
- Revenue: US$3.74 billion (2023)
- Operating income: US$963 million (2023)
- Net income: US$783 million (2023)
- Total assets: US$4.07 billion (2023)
- Total equity: US$1.66 billion (2023)
- Number of employees: 10,167 (average 2023)
- Website: cci.com.tr

Coca-Cola İçecek A.Ş. is an anchor bottler and a part of the Coca-Cola System. It is 50.3% owned by Anadolu Efes, 20.1% owned by The Coca-Cola Company, 3.7% owned by Özgörkey Holding, and the remaining 25.9% publicly traded on the Borsa İstanbul (BIST). It is the 5th largest bottler in the Coca-Cola System in terms of sales volume. The company is headquartered in Istanbul.

The company operates thirty factories in eleven countries, bottling Coca-Cola products in Azerbaijan, Iraq, Kazakhstan, Kyrgyzstan, Pakistan, Syria, Tajikistan, Uzbekistan, Turkmenistan, Bangladesh, and Jordan, as well as its home country of Turkey.

The company is included in the BIST Sustainability Index as of November 2015.
