= Coca-Cola Beverages Africa =

South African beverage bottling company

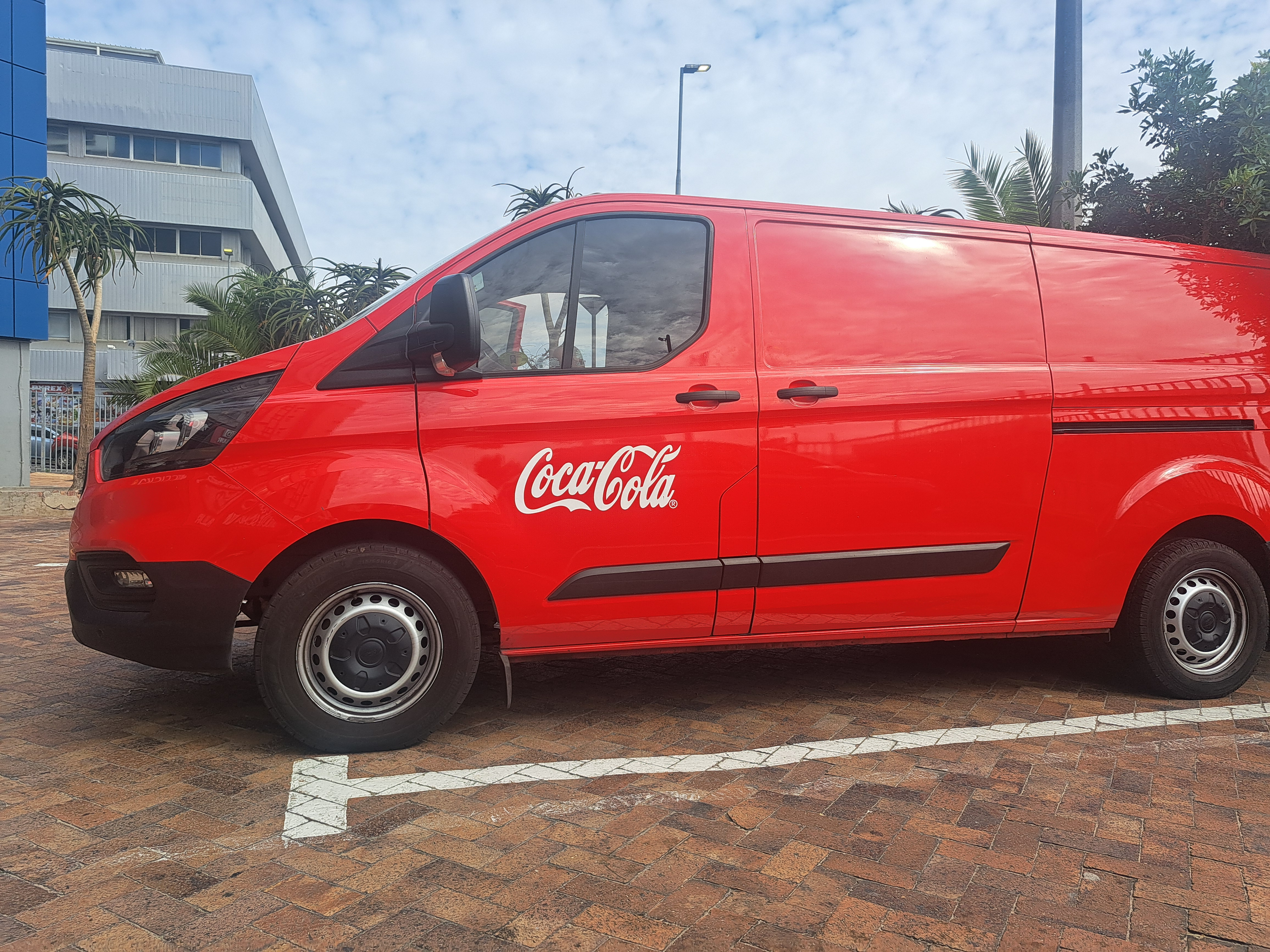
- Coca-Cola van in Cape Town
- Type: Private
- Industry: Beverage bottling
- Founded: 2014; 12 years ago (by merger)
- Headquarters: Gqeberha, Eastern Cape, South Africa
- Number of locations: 35 bottling plants (2026)
- Area served: Africa
- Key people: Sunil Gupta (CEO); Norton Kingwill (CFO)
- Products: Coca-Cola brands Other soft drinks
- Owner: The Coca-Cola Company (66.5%); Gutsche Family Investments (33.5%)
- Number of employees: 13,000+ (2026)
- Subsidiaries: Coca-Cola Beverages South Africa (CCBSA)
- Website: ccbagroup.com

Coca-Cola Beverages Africa (CCBA) is an authorized bottler of Coca-Cola beverages, headquartered in Gqeberha, in the Eastern Cape province of South Africa.

As of 2026, the company is the 8th-largest Coca-Cola authorized bottler in the world by revenue, and the largest on the African continent. Operating 35 bottling plants, CCBA's products account for over 40% of all Coca-Cola ready-to-drink beverages sold in Africa by volume. The company's beverages service over 840,000 customer outlets across 14 countries.

== History ==
On 27 November 2014, SABMiller plc, the Coca-Cola Company, and GFI, controlling 80% of the Coca-Cola South African Bottling Company (Sabco), announced that they had come to terms on a merger, which would be executed in two phases.

The first phase took 6–9 months, and the second around 12–18 months. The merger deal made Coca-Cola Beverages Africa the largest bottler in Africa and the 10th largest in the world, with annual revenue of US$3 billion.

In October 2025, it was announced that the Coca‑Cola Company and Gutsche Family Investments had agreed to sell a 75% controlling interest in Coca‑Cola Beverages Africa to Swiss bottler Coca‑Cola HBC AG. The Coca‑Cola Company and Coca‑Cola HBC also agreed to a separate option agreement for Coca‑Cola HBC to acquire the remaining 25% of CCBA still owned by the Coca‑Cola Company, within a six-year period from closing.

The first transaction was expected to close by the end of 2026. It valued CCBA, at the time of the deal, at a total of approximately R59.2 billion. As part of the deal, Coca-Cola HBC intended to obtain a secondary listing on the JSE Limited, which the company said represented its commitment to both South Africa and the African continent.

In September 2026, the South African Competition Tribunal approved the merger of Coca-Cola HBC and CCBA, subject to conditions aimed at addressing various public interest considerations. After the merger, a major expansion to Coca-Cola bottling operations in South Africa is planned. The investment, worth R17.6 billion, was the largest fixed investment project announced in South Africa in the first half of 2026.

== Operations ==
As of 2026, over 40% of CCBA's employees were based in South Africa. As of the same year, the company had over 650,000 branded coolers and around 4,300 branded vehicles.

Brands that CCBA bottles include Coca-Cola, Fanta, Sprite, Stoney Ginger Beer, Powerade, Schweppes, Valpre, Appletiser, Monster Energy, Bonaqua, and Spar-letta.
