= Isdell =

Isdell may refer to:

== People ==
- E. Neville Isdell (born 1943), Irish businessman
- Wendy Isdell (born 1975), American author

== Places ==
- Isdell River, Kimberley, Western Australia
