= NewsWhip =

Social media analytics company

- Type: Private
- Industry: Social media analytics
- Founded: 2011; 15 years ago in Ireland
- Founder: Paul Quigley; Andrew Mullaney
- Headquarters: Huckletree, 42 Pearse Street, Dublin, Ireland
- Area served: Worldwide
- Owner: Sprout Social
- Website: www.newswhip.com

NewsWhip is a social media analytics and engagement tracking firm founded by Paul Quigley and Andrew Mullaney in 2011. It monitors content based on user engagement metrics, geographic distribution, audience interests, and changes in those interests over time.

Based in Dublin, Ireland, it also has an additional office in New York City. In July 2025, Sprout Social completed the purchase of the company, in a deal valued at approximately $55 million.

== History ==
NewsWhip was founded in April 2011 by Paul Quigley, a lawyer, and Andrew Mullaney, a computer engineer. Before founding NewsWhip, Quigley worked at a law firm in New York, while Mullaney worked at Accenture, and later founded the EasyDeals website. The two met during a digital business course at the Dun Laoghaire Institute of Art, Design and Technology and participated in the National Digital Research Centre's LaunchPad accelerator program. They subsequently relocated to Dogpatch Labs in Dublin to further develop NewsWhip.

In 2012, NewsWhip received angel investments from the NDRC, Hal Philipp, and Shane Naughton. The following year, the company raised €825,000 (approximately $1.1 million) in seed funding from the Allied Irish Banks Seed Capital Fund, Hal Philipp, Hannes Þór Smárason, Enterprise Ireland and other investors. This funding supported the development of NewsWhip's flagship platform, Spike and enabled the establishment of a U.S. office in New York City.

In 2017, NewsWhip secured $6.4 million in series A funding, led by Tribal Ventures with participation from the Associated Press, Japanese publisher The Asahi Shimbun, Enterprise Ireland and AIB Seed Capital Fund.

In 2023, NewsWhip raised another $13 million (€12.1 million) in a funding round led by AshGrove Capital.

== Products and services ==
NewsWhip tracks news stories on social media platforms and their engagement rates and levels.

=== Spike ===
Launched in 2012, Spike is an analytics tool that identifies and displays trending or emerging stories from news sites and social accounts. It was developed with input from the BBC, MSNBC, Buzzfeed, the Huffington Post among others. Spike allows users to filter stories by topic, language, location, time, social media platform, and engagement metrics. It is intended for use by newsrooms and professionals in marketing and public relations.

=== Analytics ===
In 2017, NewsWhip introduced Analytics, which provides access to a historical database of audience engagement since 2014. Users can analyze data by time frame and subject matter. NewsWhip also publishes monthly rankings of the top content publishes on social media platforms. The rankings have been frequently referenced in articles on new media, technology, politics, and journalism and in articles on social media analysis. The company collaborates with PR agencies, media organizations and NGOs, including the Associated Press, Condé Nast, The Washington Post, Amnesty International, Médecins Sans Frontières, and the WHO.

=== API ===
The NewsWhip API provides an automated access to the social media content engagement data, enabling users to retrieve and analyze information about content performance across digital platforms. The interface allows researchers, media professionals, and analysts, to run tools to explore real-time and historical content interactions through customizable search and filtering capabilities.

=== Patents ===
NewsWhip applies predictive analytics and AI, including large language models (LLMs), in digital content analysis and utilizes patented technologies. US10776424B2 pertains to identifying and ranking trending digital content by measuring changes in social network activity. US9342802B2 describes a system for tracking changes in user interactions to rank digital objects by popularity. US10621680B2 outlines methods for analyzing social media engagement to assess the influence and reach of digital content.
