= Dogpatch Labs =

Innovation hub in Dublin, Ireland

- Company type: Private
- Industry: Innovation space, Accelerator, Incubator, Co-working
- Headquarters: Dublin, Ireland
- Services: Support for entrepreneurs, events, private and shared workspaces, corporate innovation
- Number of employees: 20
- Website: dogpatchlabs.com

Dogpatch Labs is a startup and innovation hub situated in the Silicon Docks area of Dublin. The company's headquarters are located in the CHQ building. Dogpatch Labs consists of over 500 members from 100+ startups.

Dogpatch Labs operates Ireland's national accelerator NDRC, with regional partner hubs RDI Hub, Republic of Work, and Portershed.

It also manages First Fridays for Startups, a major monthly ecosystem event which is delivered across Ireland by Dogpatch and its partners in the Irish Tech Hub Network Portershed, Republic of Work, RDI Hub, Ludgate Hub and Ormeau Baths. Founded in 2019.

As part of a focus to create a "better policy environment for startups" Dogpatch created and spun-out 'ScaleIreland' as an independent voice for startups. It also supports Patch, a summer accelerator for ambitious 16–21 year olds backed by Stripe which is based out of the startup hub.

It is a member of a global network of 50 startup hubs supported by Google for Startups and winner of its Global Citizenship Award in 2017 and its Global Diversity & Inclusion Award in 2018. Visitors have included The Duke & Duchess of Sussex and also The King & Queen of the Netherlands in recognition of Dogpatch's mission to accelerate the development of Ireland's entrepreneurial ecosystem.

Corporate innovation partners include Unilever, Alltech, ESB, Ulster Bank, Pivotal, CHQ, and Hannover Re. Ecosystem partners include Google, HubSpot, Microsoft and Salesforce.

Alumni include Ireland's first unicorn tech company Intercom and provides the global headquarters for CoderDojo, the volunteer-led movement of free computer programming clubs. Dogpatch also supports other social technology initiatives such as ChangeX, HackAccess, PyLadies, and Social Innovation Fund.

== History ==
Dogpatch Labs launched in the CHQ Building in March of 2015 with an initial 13,500 sq feet, through a partnership with Neville Isdell & Mervyn Greene. Their contribution has enabled the mission-driven entrepreneurial hub's rapid evolution since 2015.

As of mid-2015, the space had 25 companies with 150 desks, with a 60/40 Irish/International split, with tenants including Udemy, Twilio and ChangeX.

In November 2015, the space expanded by 8,000 sq ft with an event space and meeting rooms in the 200 year old vaults below the CHQ Building. Three months after launching, Dogpatch Labs had hosted 80 events in The Vaults.

In November 2016, Dogpatch Labs expanded for the third time, reaching a total of 40,000 sq ft of space, by adding an "Urban Garden" and private office space on its mezzanine floor. Dogpatch Labs was then home to 40+ companies, and hosting 200 tech events and 5,000 attendees per year.

In December 2018, structural works would allow for an additional 100 people to hot-desk from the space. The community was now a residence to more than 80 companies and 400 members on its three levels.

In December 2020, It was announced that Dogpatch Labs, supported by its partner hubs in Cork, Kerry and Galway, had been awarded the €17m contract to manage the National Digital Research Centre service for the next five years. As part of the NDRC contract, Dogpatch Labs Dublin and its regional partners (Portershed Galway, Republic of Work Cork and RDI Hub Kerry) would deliver "mentorship-driven accelerator and pre-accelerator programmes, and pre-seed funding to entrepreneurs across Ireland".

In July 2021 ESB Group, Ireland's national energy provider selected Dogpatch Labs to operate its internal innovation programme, X-Potential, until 2025. Dogpatch was chosen by ESB for the contract after a tender process, having previously run the X-Potential programme in 2019 and 2020.

In February 2022 Dogpatch Labs announced that its First Fridays for Startups event would go all-Ireland, with each month's event being held from a different hub in the Irish Tech Hub Network around the country.

== Recognition ==
Dogpatch Labs is a member of a global network of 50+ startup hubs supported by Google For Startups and winner of its Global Citizenship Award in 2017 and its Global Diversity & Inclusion Award in 2018.

Visitors have included The Duke & Duchess of Sussex and also The King & Queen of the Netherlands in recognition of Dogpatch's mission to accelerate the development of Ireland's entrepreneurial ecosystem.

In 2019 it was listed by Crunchbase as one of the ‘top 10 incubators around the world you need to know’. Other notable speakers include Vint Cerf, one of the "Fathers of the Internet", Sridhar Ramaswamy. and Apple co-founder Steve Wozniak.

The managing director of Dogpatch Labs, Patrick Walsh, was awarded the Guaranteed Irish Tech Hero title in 2017 for his "significant contribution to the tech industry in Ireland" and for having "contributed greatly to establishing Ireland as leading startup hub".

In 2015 it welcomed former Taoiseach Enda Kenny to launch Ireland's "Enterprise 2025" strategy & in 2019 the then Taoiseach Leo Varadkar launched the ‘Future Jobs Ireland’ initiative, recognizing that Dogpatch Labs is "Ireland’s largest start-up hub and is a keystone in our technology ecosystem".

== First Fridays for Startups ==
Dogpatch Labs runs an event called "First Fridays for Startups" on a monthly basis, which acts as a "platform where members of the Irish startup ecosystem come together on a regular basis, enabling them to learn, connect and grow". 1,000+ mentors from Ireland's FDI sector support the growth of Irish startups via First Fridays, with partners including some of the biggest multinationals in Ireland Google, HubSpot, Microsoft and Salesforce.

Managed by Dogpatch Labs and delivered all across Ireland by the Irish Tech Hub Network, the programme includes: 1-to-1 curated mentoring, expert workshops, advisory panels and fireside chats, as well as free hotdesking for the day.

In its five years, First Fridays has attracted over 7,000 attendees, 650 startups and delivered 1,000+ mentoring hours. Previous speakers have included Peter Coppinger (founder of Teamwork.com), Nora Khaldi (co-founder of Nuritas), Mark Cummins (Founder of Pointy), Alison Darcy (Founder of Woebot), Pat Phelan (co-founder of Sisu), Linda Kiely (co-founder of Voxpro), Bobby Healy (Founder of Manna) and Áine Kerr (co-founder of Kinzen).

== NDRC ==
Dogpatch Labs operates the National Digital Research Centre (NDRC), an accelerator programme for "globally ambitious" entrepreneurs, on behalf of the Department of the Environment, Climate and Communications. It offers a "mentorship-driven" approach, with €100,000 "founder-friendly" funding, and early stage supports including non-equity pre-accelerator programmes available to entrepreneurs across Ireland. It also runs a Masterclass Series for companies working in the start-up space, teaching them how to support young digital venture teams with significant scale potential.

Dogpatch Labs and its regional partners were appointed on a contract worth up to 17 million euro in December 2020 as part of a competitive tender.

In the first year of Dogpatch Labs taking over the contract, the NDRC accelerator had over 500 applications. NDRC alumni include Nuritas, Soundwave, Boxever (acquired by Sitecore), and Silvercloud Health.

Dogpatch Labs offers successful applicants to the NDRC Accelerator a €100,000 investment using SAFE (Simple Agreement for Future Equity) which was originally introduced by Y Combinator (YC) in late 2013. In September 2021 Dogpatch Labs open-sourced its version of the YCombinator SAFE, adapted for Irish Law, for any founders and investors in the Irish startup ecosystem to use.

== ScaleIreland ==
Dogpatch created and spun-out ‘ScaleIreland’ in 2019 as an independent voice for startups, as part of a focus to create a better policy environment for startups. Dogpatch Labs CEO Patrick Walsh is a member of the Steering Group, while ScaleIreland is chaired by serial entrepreneur and investor Brian Caulfield, and led by Martina Fitzgerald as CEO.

Scale Ireland is an independent non-profit organisation whose mission is to support, represent and advocate on behalf of Irish tech start-up and scale-up companies, to create the most advantageous conditions for them to succeed. Its work includes policy submissions regarding R&D tax credits, reform of the EIIS scheme, and improvements to CGT for entrepreneurs.

== Patch ==
Patch is a summer accelerator programme for ambitious 16- to 21-year olds based out of Dogpatch Labs. It was founded by then 15-year old Tom McCarthy in 2015 with the support of Dogpatch CEO Patrick Walsh, who after an initial meeting suggested Tom put together an event to bring together like-minded young people.

Teams who have worked on start-ups in Patch include Wunder Engine, producing 3D prints of a customer's own Minecraft creations, and Cropsafe, which uses machine learning and satellite imaging to monitor crop health for farmers.

In November 2021 Patch signed a three-year partnership with Irish-founded payment company Stripe to support the expansion of its work. Stripe joined other key Patch supporters, including Pointy's Mark Cummins, Dogpatch Labs and the Naughton Foundation, along with entrepreneurs Bobby Healy and Ray Nolan, in funding the youth accelerator's future work.
