= Quarantine Act 1800 =

Act of the Parliament of Great Britain

- Act of Parliament
- Parliament of Great Britain
- Long title: An Act for erecting a Lazaret on Chetney Hill, in the County of Kent; and for reducing into one Act the Laws relating to Quarantine; and for making further Provision therein.
- Citation: 39 & 40 Geo. 3. c. 80
- Territorial extent: Great Britain

Dates
- Royal assent: 28 July 1800
- Commencement: 1 October 1800 (Note: Section 37.)
- Repealed: 1 April 1805
Other legislation
Repeals/revokes	See § Repealed enactments
Repealed by	Quarantine Act 1805

Status: Repealed

Text of statute as originally enacted

The Quarantine Act 1800 (39 & 40 Geo. 3. c. 80) was an act of the Parliament of Great Britain that authorised the erection of a lazaret on Chetney Hill in Kent and consolidated enactments related to quarantine in Great Britain.

== Provisions ==
=== Repealed enactments ===
Section 8 of the act repealed 6 enactments, listed in that section, with effect from 1 October 1800. The repeal of three of those enactments was limited to so much of them as related to the performance of quarantine. Any other act was also repealed in so far as it related to the performance of quarantine and was contrary to the provisions of the act.

Citation	Short title	Description	Extent of repeal
26 Geo. 2. c. 6	Quarantine Act 1753	An Act to oblige Ships more effectually to perform their Quarantine, and for the better preventing the Plague being brought from Foreign Parts into Great Britain or Ireland, or the Isles of Guernsey, Jersey, Alderney, Sark, or Man.	The whole act.
29 Geo. 2. c. 8	Quarantine Act 1756	An Act to repeal a Clause in an Act, made in the Twenty-sixth Year of His present Majesty, intituled, "An Act to oblige Ships more effectually to perform their Quarantine, and for the better preventing the Plague being brought from Foreign Parts into Great Britain or Ireland, or the Isles of Guernsey, Jersey, Alderney, Sark, or Man," whereby the stationing of Ships infected with the Plague to the Northward of Cape Finisterre, is confined to the Harbour of New Grimsby, and removeable to no other Place, and for appointing a more safe and commodious Place instead thereof.	The whole act.
12 Geo. 3. c. 57	Lazarets Act 1772	An Act to explain and amend so much of an Act made in the Twenty-sixth Year of the Reign of His late Majesty King George the Second, as relates to the Establishment of Lazarets.	The whole act.
28 Geo. 3. c. 34	Quarantine and Customs Act 1788	An Act more effectually to secure the Performance of Quarantine, and for amending several Laws relating to the Revenue of Customs.	So much as relates to the Performance of Quarantine.
38 Geo. 3. c. 33	Quarantine, etc. Act 1798	An Act to amend Two Acts, made in the Twenty-sixth Year of King George the Second, and the Twenty-eighth Year of the Reign of His present Majesty, respecting the Performance of Quarantine; for punishing Persons acting contrary to any Order in Council, which may be made for laying any Embargo on Ships or Vessels, or for prohibiting or regulating the Exportation of any Goods, Wares, or Merchandize; to prevent the fraudulent Importation of Glass into this Kingdom; for permitting the Removal of Coffee and Cocoa Coastwise, for the greater Convenience of Exportation; to authorize the Commissioners of the Customs to return the Duties paid on Goods imported, which shall be lost or destroyed before the Landing thereof; to prevent Vessels licensed by the Admiralty from being engaged in any Trade or Employment not permitted by their Licences; for permitting Wines put on board any of His Majesty's Ships to be removed from one Ship to another, without being first landed and warehoused; and for extending the Provisions of an Act, made in the Thirty-third Year of the Reign of His present Majesty, to Wines delivered into the Charge of the Collector and Comptroller of His Majesty's Customs at the Port of Falmouth.	So much as relates to the Performance of Quarantine.
39 Geo. 3. c. 99	Trade to the Levant Seas Act 1799	An Act to encourage the Trade into the Levant Seas, by providing a more convenient Mode of performing Quarantine; and for reducing the Duty, granted by an Act of the last Session, on Goods the Manufacture of Great Britain, exported to any Place within the Streights of Gibraltar.	So much as relates to the Performance of Quarantine.

== Subsequent developments ==
The whole act was repealed by section 9 of the Quarantine Act 1805 (45 Geo. 3. c. 10), which came into force on 1 April 1805.
