= LearnUpon =

- Original authors: Brendan Noud; Des V. Anderson
- Developer: LearnUpon Limited
- Release: June 2012; 14 years ago
- Operating system: Cross-platform
- Platform: Web application, SaaS, iOS, Android
- Available in: Multilingual
- Type: Learning management system
- License: Proprietary
- Website: learnupon.com

LearnUpon is a cloud-based learning management system (LMS) software. It is developed by LearnUpon Limited, which is based in Dublin, Ireland.

== History ==
LearnUpon was founded in 2012 by Brendan Noud and Des Anderson to develop a learning management system. It took part in the National Digital Research Centre's Launchpad accelerator programme in Dublin, and received early funding from Enterprise Ireland and the NDRC.

In November 2025, LearnUpon acquired Courseau, a Berlin-based AI-assisted course authoring platform.

== Reception ==
In 2019, Molly McLaughlin and Juan Martinez of PCMag reviewed the software and wrote positively about it.
