= EPIC The Irish Emigration Museum =

Museum in Dublin

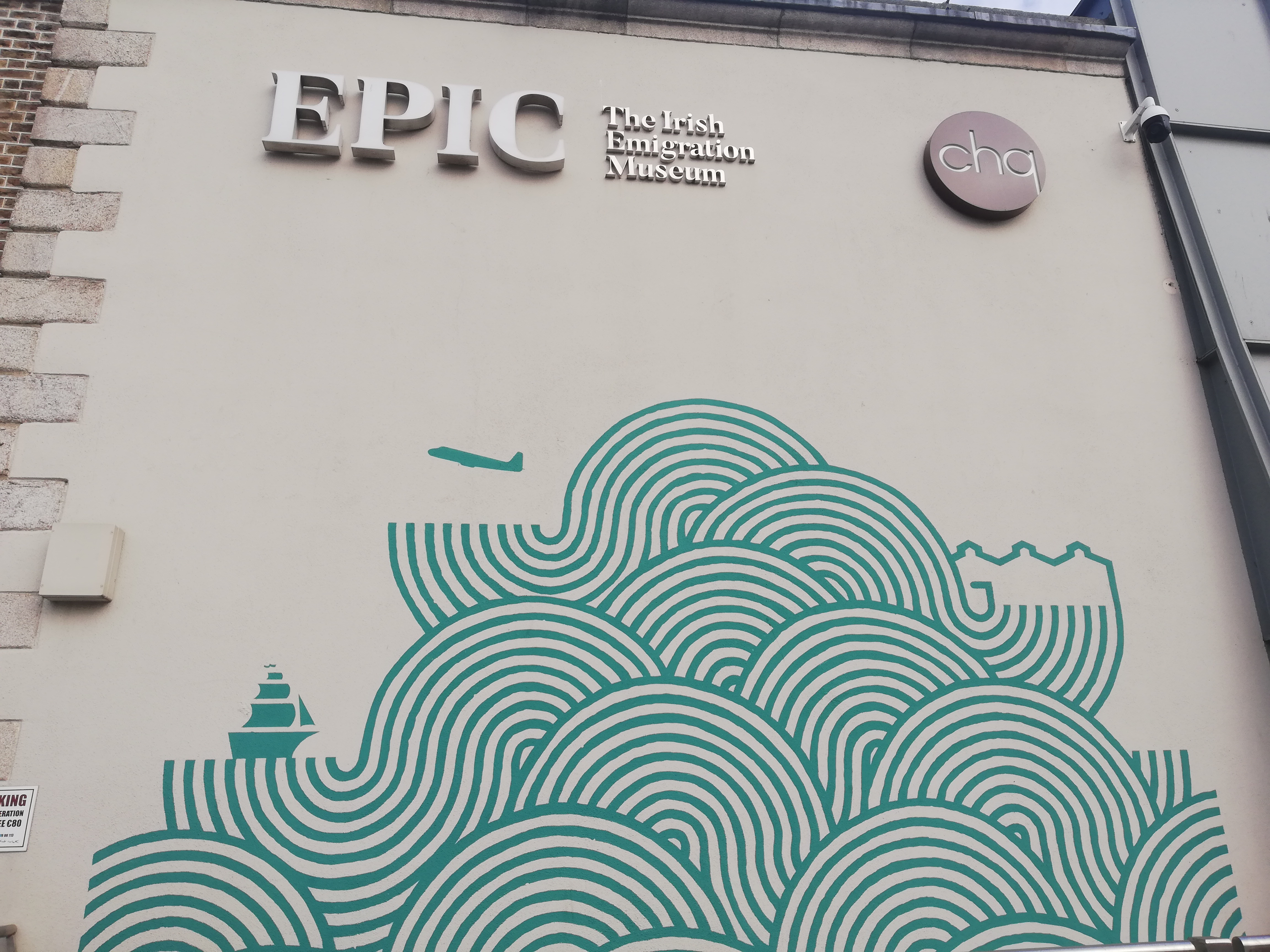
- Mural at Epic

- Location within Central Dublin
- Former name: EPIC Ireland
- Established: May 2016
- Location: CHQ Custom House Quay; Dublin, Ireland
- Coordinates: 53°20′53″N 6°14′53″W
- Type: Cultural History
- Founder: Neville Isdell
- Architect: Event Communications
- Owner: Neville Isdell
- Public transit access: Luas (Red Line), George's Dock stop, DART (Pearse Station, Tara Street Station), Irish Rail (Connolly Station)
- Parking: ParkRite IFSC
- Website: epicchq.com

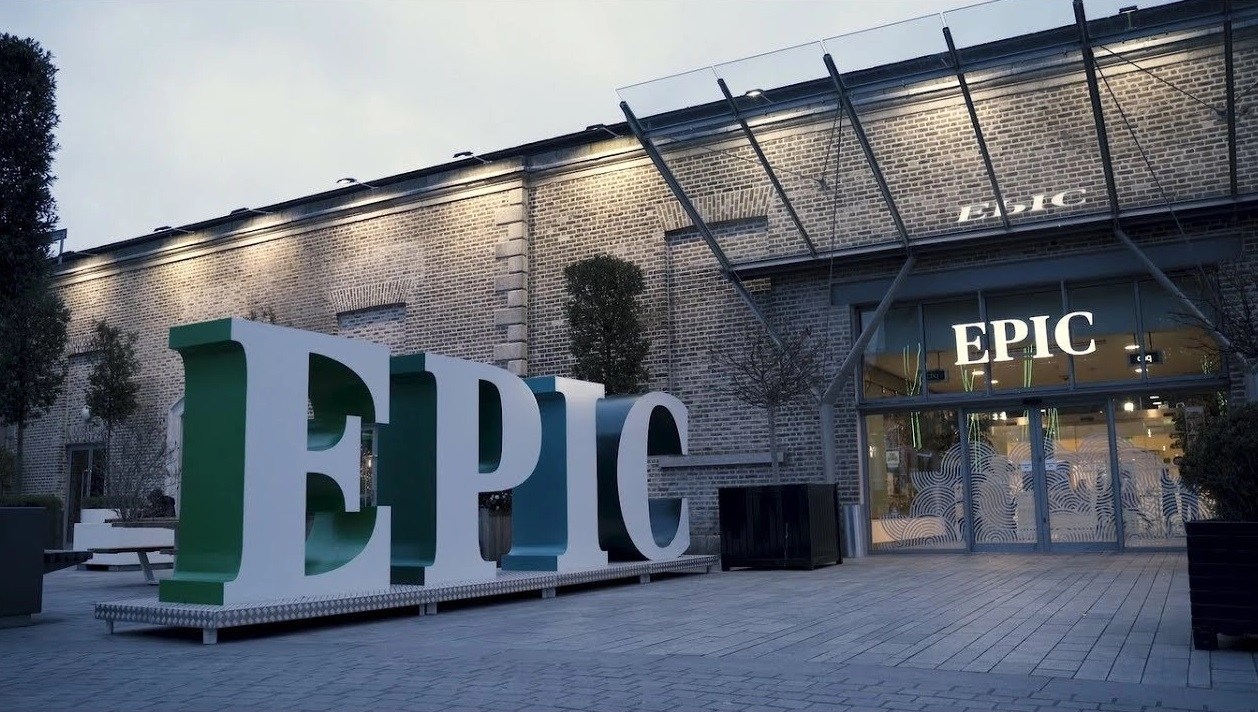
Entrance

EPIC The Irish Emigration Museum, located in Dublin's Docklands, covers the history of the Irish diaspora and emigration to other countries. The museum, which is privately owned, was designed by the London-based design firm Event Communications. It was voted as "Europe's Leading Tourist Attraction" at the 2019, 2020 and 2021 World Travel Awards.

== Creation ==
EPIC is a privately owned museum, founded by Neville Isdell, former chairman and chief executive of The Coca-Cola Company, who was born in County Down. During 2015, an advisory group was assembled to consult on the development of EPIC The Irish Emigration Museum. In May 2016, EPIC was officially opened by former President of Ireland Mary Robinson.

EPIC is located in the vaults of the CHQ Building, a listed building originally built in 1820 by John Rennie and completed by Thomas Telford for use as a bonded customs warehouse. The building was restored by the DDDA in the early 2000s.

The exhibition was designed and developed by a London-based specialist museum design consultancy called Event Communications that had also designed the award-winning Titanic Belfast attraction. At its opening in 2016, the Irish Independent reported that Isdell has invested Euro 15 million in the project, and that "my experience was of a bold series of 20 galleries slickly fitted with at times breathtakingly immersive technology-driven displays". The Irish Times described EPIC as "the world’s first fully digital museum and had 120,000 visitors in its first year", when it was nominated for the European Museum of the Year Award in 2018. EPIC went on to win Europe's Leading Tourist Attraction at the World Travel Awards in 2019, 2020 and 2021.

== Exhibits ==
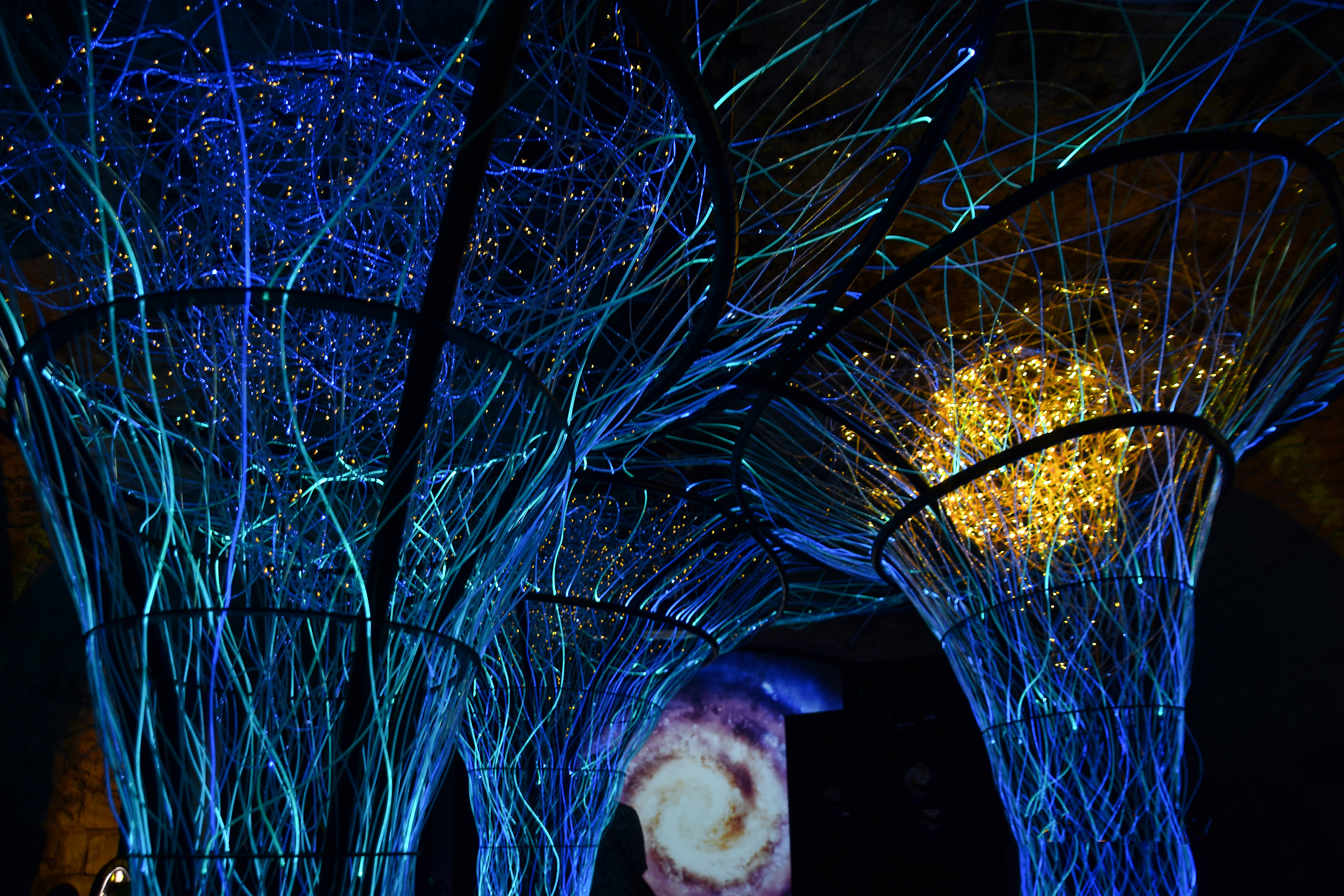
Interior display

The exhibition is made up of twenty galleries which are each individually themed, and fall under the headings of Migration (Galleries 1 to 2), Motivation (Galleries 4 to 7), Influence (Galleries 8 to 18) and Diaspora Today (Galleries 19 to 20).

The "Migration" galleries, for example, deal with migration patterns from Ireland since 500AD. These galleries cover religious missionary work, the Irish famine, religious and social persecution, criminal transportation, and the effects of Irish involvement in foreign conflicts. Displays include a series of video testimonies from six Irish emigrants.

== See also ==
- Guinness Storehouse
- National Gallery of Ireland
- Jeanie Johnston
- Titanic Belfast
