= The Flowers Foundations =

American charitable organizations

The Anne and Chris Flowers Foundation and the J.C. Flowers Foundation are charitable organizations founded by private equity investor J. Christopher Flowers and his wife, Anne W. Flowers. They operate primarily by providing funding and logistical support to community organizations that tackle local social issues, primarily malaria in Africa and parolee recidivism in New York. Recipients have also included Harvard University, the New York Philharmonic Orchestra, various Episcopal and Anglican organizations, and numerous others. Through this organization, The Flowers Foundation has provided resources to help prevent malaria in these African countries. Working with a wide number of partners to help "last mile" communities battle malaria. Through government funding, local organizations, grassroots organizations, and expertise to make this foundation a success as a resource for the prevention of malaria.

== NetsforLife/Malaria Elimination ==
In October 2004, founder Chris Flowers traveled to several remote areas in Zambia. On a visit to the Anglican Mission in Fiwila, Zambia, Flowers witnessed the funeral of a child who had died of malaria, and during his tour of Zambia came to realize that communities did not understand the cause of malaria or its prevention. Many believed that Malaria was not actually a disease but, more of a curse, moral, or social transgression. There are many different perspectives and ideas of that Malaria can be prevented but not controlled, as some people are not willing to-do/ use preventive measures.

As a result, the Foundation, in partnership with a number of other organizations, founded Nets For Life. Nets For Life distributes insecticide-treated anti-malaria bed nets in remote areas in Africa, typically in partnership with the local Anglican church. Partners in this effort have included Episcopal Relief and Development, various Anglican organizations in Africa, Coca-Cola, ExxonMobil, Standard Chartered Bank, and the Starr Foundation.

In 2010, former Coca-Cola CEO Neville Isdell partnered with the Foundations to establish the Isdell: Flowers Cross-Border Anti-Malaria Initiative, which also distributes anti-malaria bed nets, in this case in Angola, Namibia, Zambia and Zimbabwe.

As of December 2014, the Foundations, Nets For Life and the Isdell:Flowers Initiative have raised a total of $34 million for programs to combat malaria in Africa, reaching over 25 million people and distributing over 12 million anti-malaria bed nets.

== Angola ==
The Flowers Foundation places an emphasis on helping Angola combat and eliminate the dangerous disease of malaria. The Flowers Foundation brings in community workers, volunteers, teachers and many others to help educate Angolan citziens on the importance and strategies to combat Malaria. The Diocese Center and South has made it necessary to equip most affected areas in Angola in the hope of fewer malaria cases with these safe preventions.The community has representatives such as mothers, teachers, and leader that have created 12 Community Malaria Elimination Committees. Local faith leaders in the Angola community have made major impacts with the government to train and teach the community on malaria elimination.

== Namibia ==
Namibia focusses on community-based outreach known as the Natural Vector-Borne Diseases Control Center. With community, Malaria workers provide outreach support for the prevention of Malaria by providing house-to-house visits to educate the Namibia community. In 2022, there was over 30,000 households educated on the safety precautions of Malaria and how fatal this diseases can be without being treated and prevented correctly. Working with over 200 traditional leaders, this helps the Namibia community grasp the importance of the NACOD team, and the volunteer work they are providing. Along with house visits, there are also 12 clinics that have improved the health of the Namibia community with diagnosis of Malaria, anti-malaria courses, and provide education on Malaria.

== Zambia ==
The Anglican diocese of Lusaka supported the government through the Flowers Foundation by spraying indoor residual spraying. Training the community leaders and volunteers to correctly to spray and set up bed nets correctly. These preventive measure can help have a positive impact on accepting these strategies. Having the bed nets properly hung is very important for the prevention of mosquitoes. As in Nambia, having community-based leaders provides security, support, and relief when bringing in something new into such a tight-knit community as Zambia and Africa are. Community health workers have provided over 216,000 prevention household strategies and have treated 16,000 cases of Malaria in Zambia. Recent reports in 2022 report 87 percent of pregnant women have taken preventive medication called IPTp. Moving in steps forward by using bed nets, indoor spraying, and medication can all help prevent the fatalities of malaria in Africa.

== Zimbabwe ==
In Zimbabwe as well as Zambia, the Anglican Diocese of Lusaka provideseducation on Net for Life and the protective measures of malaria. Over 200 village workers from Mashonaland West and Matabeleland will educate these communities in Zimbabwe on the importance of the lethal disease malaria.These village workers are trained and educated on how to identify symptoms, provide testing, and be able to treat anyone who has been infected with malaria. In 2022, health workers in the village tested 12,386 Zimbabwean citizens with suspected malaria symptoms. Out of those 12,386, 3,209 were positive for malaria and were treated at a village health center or a health facility. Faithleaders, chiefs, and headmen have all influenced the stop and precauitions to the community about malaria. The National Malaria Control Center collaborated with the dioceses of Matabele to provide training for these local leaders. These skills in transmission, presentation, case management, and principles are updated yearly, and the Minister of Health and Care officials are annually educated.
