= King Abdullah Petroleum Studies and Research Center =

Independent non-profit think tank, Saudi Arabia

- مركز الملك عبدالله للدراسات والبحوث البترولية
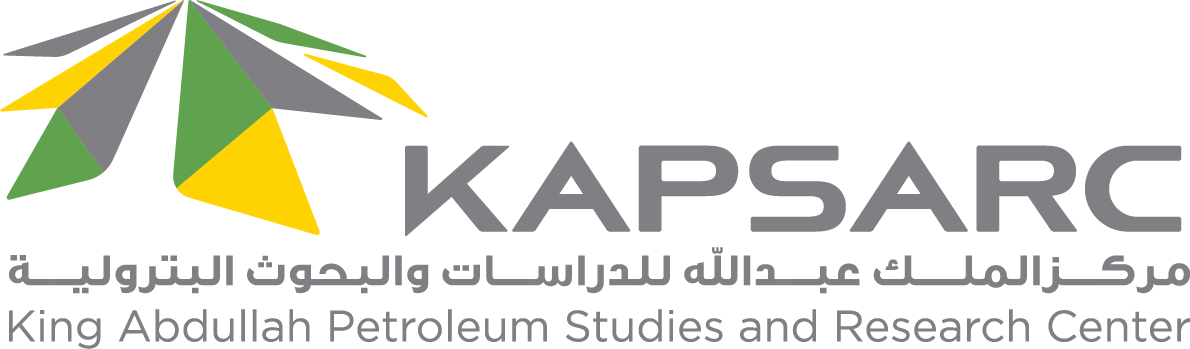

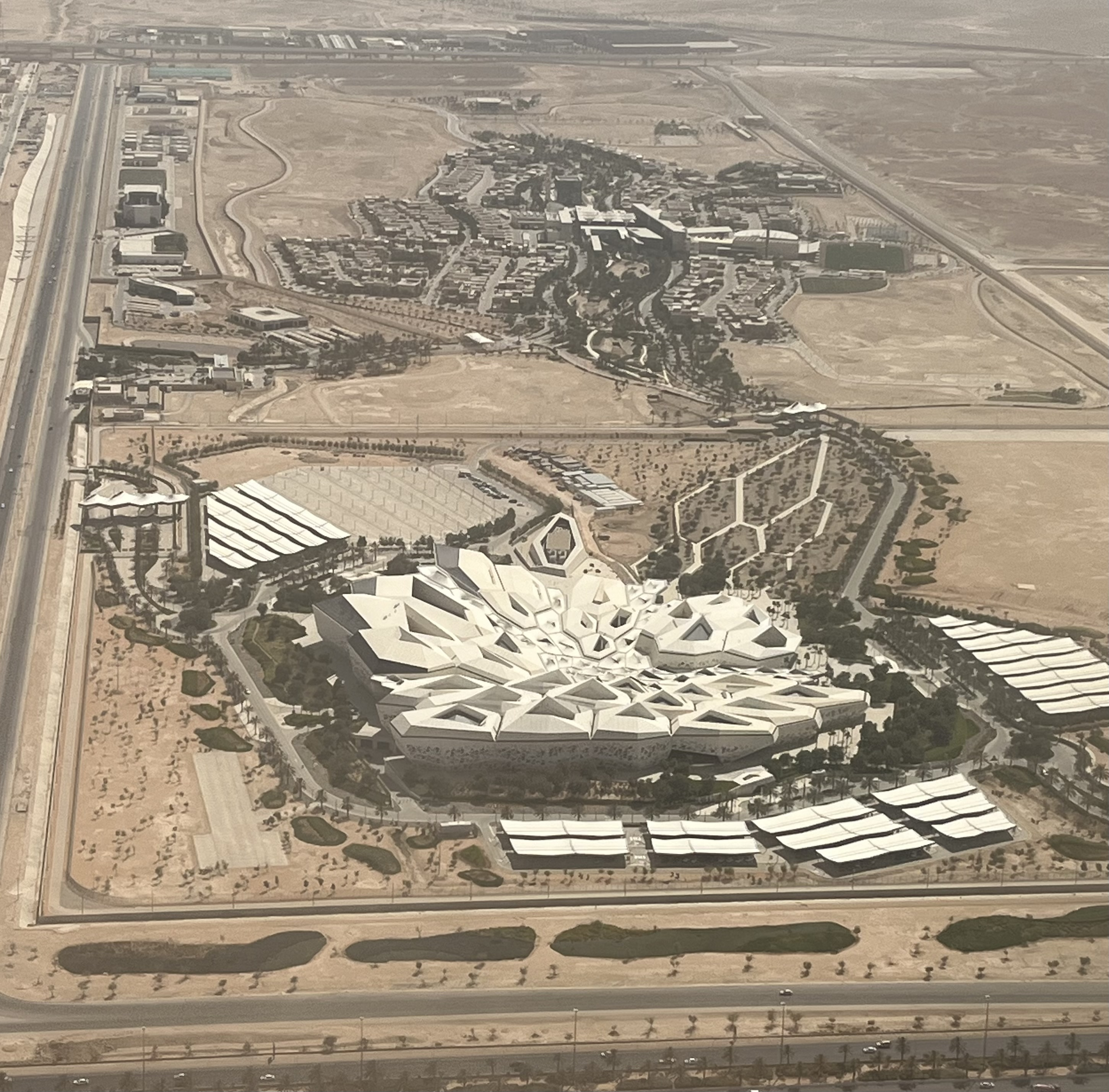
- KAPSARC aerial view, 2024
- Abbreviation: KAPSARC
- Formation: 2007
- Legal status: Active
- Purpose: Advisory think tank
- Locations: KAPSARC; Airport Road; P.O. Box 88550; Riyadh 11672; Saudi Arabia
- Coordinates: 24°52′45.2636″N 46°43′19.4462″E
- Chair of the Board of Trustees: HRH Prince Abdulaziz Bin Salman Al-Saud
- Website: www.kapsarc.org

The King Abdullah Petroleum Studies and Research Center (KAPSARC) is a research and advisory organization focusing on energy economics, climate and sustainability. It is located in Riyadh, Saudi Arabia.

In 2020 KAPSARC was ranked by the University of Pennsylvania Think Tank and Civil Societies Program as 12th place out of 60th in its list of global top Energy and Resource Policy think tanks. It was ranked 15th out of 103 in the MENA Think Tank Index 2019.

In 2023, KAPSARC received observer status with the United Nations Environment Programme (UNEP). It had previously received observer status under the United Nations Framework Convention on Climate Change (UNFCCC).

== History ==
KAPSARC was inaugurated by the Custodian of the Two Holy Mosques King Salman in 2016.

== Governance ==
KAPSARC's Board of Trustees has controlling authority over the center's affairs, policies and governance. Chaired by the Minister of Energy (HRH Prince Abdilaziz Bin Salman Al-Saud). The Board is responsible for the center's strategic direction, financial oversight, and alignment with Saudi Vision 2030. In 2025, the Board approved a comprehensive rebranding of the institution and the establishment of the KAPSARC School of Public Policy (KSPP). Senior advisors to the Board include former president Adam Sieminski.The current President of KAPSARC is Fahad Alajlan. He assumed the role in August 2021.

== Campus ==
The KAPSARC campus in Riyadh contains both a Residential Campus (called the REC, located on the west side) and a Research and Office Complex (called the ROC, on the east side). The 70,000 square meters Research and Office Complex was designed by Zaha Hadid, and supported by Event Communications. Hadid received the commission after a 2009 design competition. It opened in October 2017 and received a LEED Platinum certification. The complex consists of five interlocking buildings, a research center, a computer center, a conference center, a library and the Musalla, a place for prayer.

== Research initiatives and publications ==
In 2019, KAPSARC created four energy-economics products. According to KAPSARC, the products included podcasts, short analyses, commentaries, and open models and tools. One of its models is called the KAPSARC Energy Model (KEM).

In 2019 the center's publications in 10 initiatives – including energy, economy, oil, electricity, transportation, and climate change – rose by 32.5% compared with 2018, from 86 to 114 studies.

The center introduced more than 1,250 open-access models and research tools.

In 2022, KAPSARC launched the second edition of the Circular Carbon Economy Index, a tool to compare how 64 countries are deploying various methods and technologies to reduce their CO_{2} emissions.

Launched during the UN Climate Change Conference, COP27, the CCE Index covers 90% of the global economy and carbon emissions. The number of countries included in the Index has increased from 30 to 64, compared with the first index that was launched during COP26 in Glasgow. The launched CCE is based on four Rs, namely, reducing, recycling, reusing, and removing.

=== T20 ===
KAPSARC and the King Faisal Center for Research and Islamic Studies (KFCRIS) held the Think20 (T20) Inception Conference in Riyadh, Saudi Arabia on January 19–20, 2020

KAPSARC represented Saudi Arabia at the T20 summit in Buenos Aires in September 2018 and participated in the T20 inception meeting for 2019 that was held in Tokyo in December 2018.

The T20 is an engagement group that contributes to the G20 by providing research-based policy recommendations to the G20. The T20 presented policy recommendations developed by T20 Saudi Arabia task forces for consideration by the Leaders of G20 member countries during their summit in Riyadh in November 2020.

The Inception Conference convened more than 150 institutions and think tanks, and over 550 attendees from 65 countries, to discuss issues covering climate and energy, women and youth, innovation and technology, multilateralism, economic development and finance, food security and access to water.

== Partners ==
The center's partners include:

- King Abdulaziz City for Science and Technology (KSA)
- King Abdullah City for Atomic and Renewable Energy (K.A.CARE)
- Kuwait Institute for Scientific Research
- Ministry of Economy and Planning (KSA)
- Saudi Arabian Monetary Agency (KSA)
- Saudi Aramco (KSA)
- Saudi Electricity Company (KSA)
- Saudi Standards, Metrology and Quality Organization (KSA)
- TERI University (India)
- Institute of Energy Economics, Japan (IEEJ)
- The Energy and Resources Institute (India)
- World Bank
- Arabian Gulf University (Bahrain)
- Atlantic Council (United States)
- Center for Strategic and International Studies (United States)
- China National Petroleum Corporation – Institute of Economics and Technology
- China Sustainable Transport Center
- Derasat (Bahrain)
- Electricity and Cogeneration Regulatory Authority (KSA)
- Energy Research Institute of the NDRC (China)
- Gulf Cooperation Council Interconnection Authority (KSA)
- Imperial College (United Kingdom)
- Khalifa University of Science and Technology (UAE)

KAPSARC signed memoranda of understanding with SEC, GCCIA and ECRA for research on the electricity sector.

== See also ==
- King Faisal Center for Research and Islamic Studies
- List of think tanks
