= CHQ Building =

Industrial building in Dublin, Ireland

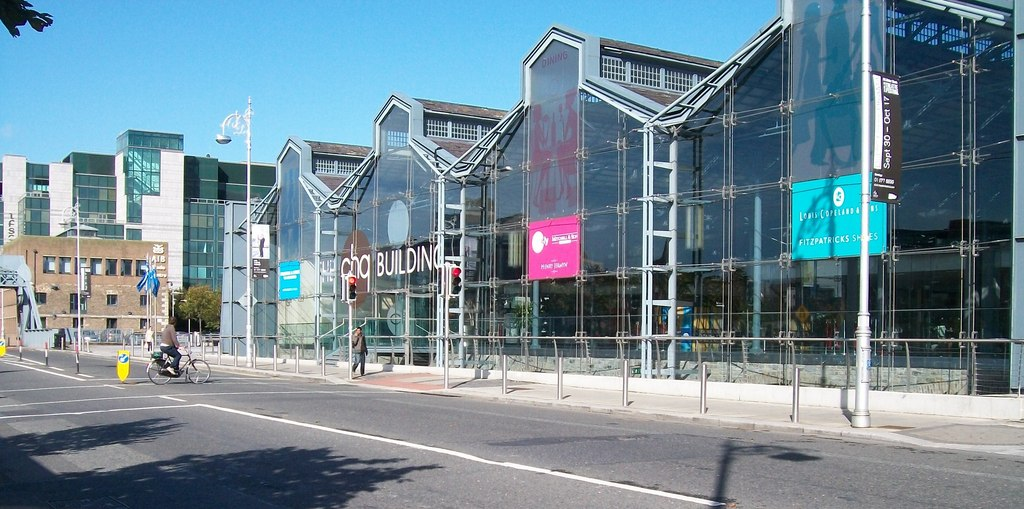
- Building in 2010 from the Liffey side
- Interactive map of the CHQ Building area
- Former names: Stack A
- Alternative names: Tobacco store

General information
- Type: Market and shopping arcade
- Location: Ireland
- Coordinates: 53.3488°N 6.248°W
- Completed: 1820
- Opened: 1821
- Renovated: 2005
- Owner: E. Neville Isdell and Mervyn Greene

Technical details
- Material: cast iron, brick, calp limestone, granite

Design and construction
- Architect: John Rennie the Elder
- Engineer: John Rennie
- Other designers: Ironwork by Butterley Iron Foundry, Derbyshire

Renovating team
- Architect: Michael Collins Associates

The CHQ Building, formerly known as Stack A, is an industrial building in Dublin, Ireland. CHQ stands for "Custom House Quay", named for the nearby Custom House. Known as the Tobacco Store to dockworkers, it was built in 1820 to store cargos of tobacco, tea, wine and spirits and later grain and flour.

Tobacco, tea and grain and flour were kept in separate compartments above ground. Wine and spirit casks were stored in the bonded vaults below ground.

== Description ==
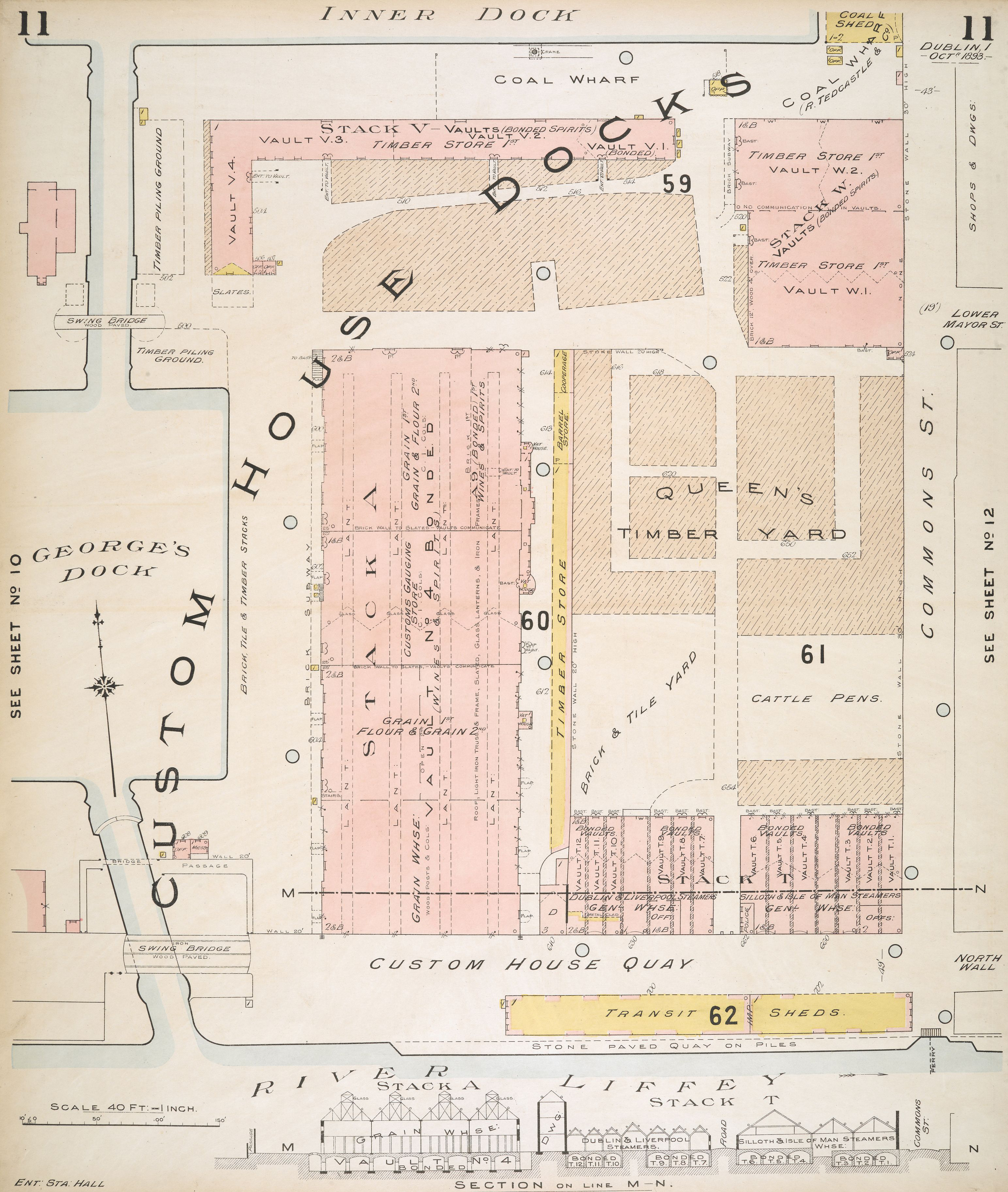
Insurance Plan of the City of Dublin Vol. 1; sheet 11 detailing the building

The building was designed by the Scottish engineer John Rennie, with his son of the same name working as his principal assistant. When it was constructed, the building had one of the largest single interior spaces in the city, and its brick external walls enclosed a space of more than 8,000sqm. The structure was supported by a cast iron frame supporting a slated roof. No wood was used in the construction. The building measures 155m by 55m and of the original nine vaults that run west to east and cover the entire footprint of the building, eight and a half remain after the building was reduced by 5m at its southern end in 1884 in order to widen Custom House Quay. A total of eleven warehouses or "stacks", as well as three deep-water docks were built on reclaimed land making up the Custom House Docks complex.

A description of the CHQ Building dating from 1821 by the Rev. George Newenham Wright, an Anglican clergyman, noted that:

"the tobacco store (500 feet by 160, and capable of containing 3,000 hogsheads), the plan of which was given by John Rennie, Esq [has] nine vaults beneath, which altogether afford perfect and convenient storage for 4,500 pipes of wine, allowing a walk behind the heads of the pipes as well as between them; these vaults are lighted by means of thick lenses set in iron plates in the floor of the tobacco store; but this is not sufficient to supersede the necessity of candle light. [The] roof is supported by metal frame-work of an ingenious construction [..] supported by three rows of cylindrical metal pillars, 26 in each row; these rest upon others of granite, which are continued through the stone floor into the vaults beneath."

== Usage ==
In addition to its use as a storehouse, because of the large interior space, the building has also been put to other uses.

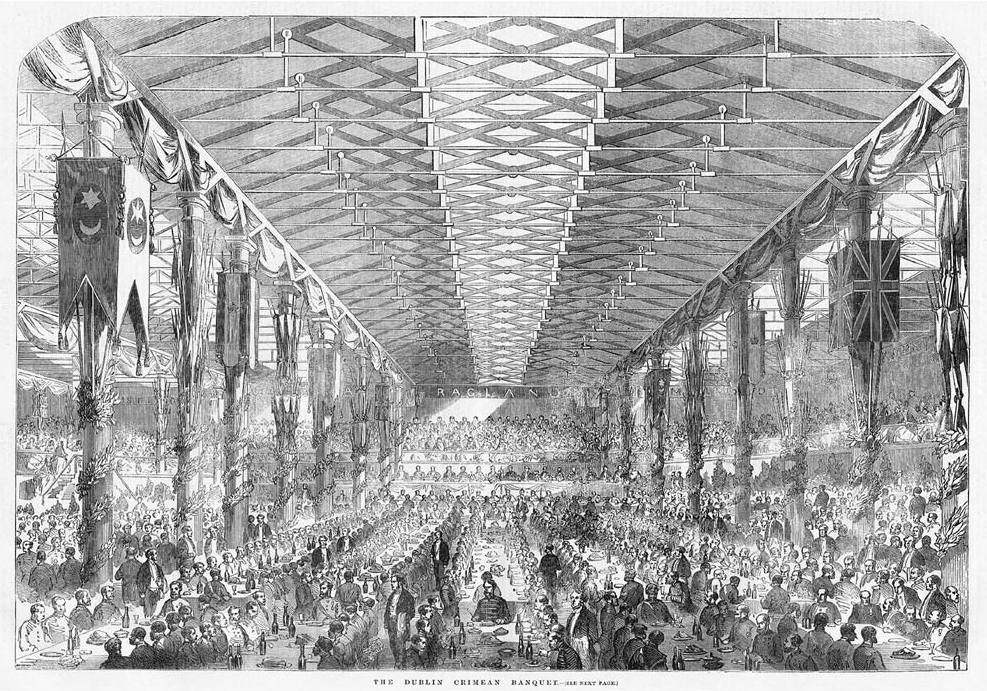
Interior of the building in 1856 during the Crimean War banquet

For example, on 22 October 1856, the building was the chosen venue for a banquet, paid for by the citizens of Dublin, in honour of those Irish soldiers who had served in the British Army during the Crimean War. The 'Great National Banquet' was the brainchild of Fergus Farrell, the Lord Mayor of Dublin, who had been a deputy to Daniel O'Connell. It is estimated that one third of the 111,000 men who served in the war were Irish, including 114 of those involved in the Charge of the Light Brigade. The guests at the banquet included 3,628 soldiers from regiments quartered in Dublin and the four provinces, as well as 1,000 non-military guests, principally subscribers, seated in the gallery overlooking the hall. Hugh Gough, 1st Viscount Gough, the Tipperary-born Colonel-in-Chief of the 60th Royal Rifles, addressed and toasted the attendees.

In the early 2000s, the protected structure was restored by the Dublin Docklands Development Authority. Irishman Neville Isdell, a former chairman and CEO of Coca-Cola, along with Mervyn Greene, purchased the building in late 2013 with the intention of further developing the structure. Today, the building contains a number of businesses, including the EPIC The Irish Emigration Museum and Dogpatch Labs.

== See also ==
- George's Dock, Dublin
