= Event Communications =

Museum exhibition design firm

Coordinates: 51°30′8.7534″N 0°4′24.8689″W

Event Communications ("Event")
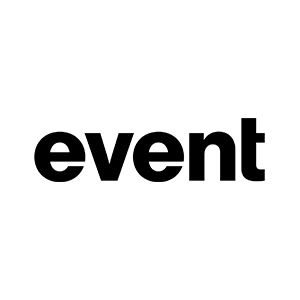
- Company type: Private limited liability
- Industry: Design and Architecture
- Founded: May 1986; 40 years ago
- Founders: Celestine Phelan; Steve Simons
- Headquarters: India House; 45 Curlew Street; London; SE1 2ND; United Kingdom
- Number of locations: London, Dublin, Kuwait, Oman, Hong Kong
- Key people: James Alexander (Chief Executive Officer); Esther Dugdale (Chief Design Officer); Eithne Owens (Head of Content)
- Services: Exhibition and attraction design consultancy
- Revenue: £10–15 million (2018)
- Number of employees: 50–100 (2018)
- Subsidiaries: Event Ireland Limited
- Website: www.eventcomm.com

Event Communications, or Event, is one of Europe's longest-established and largest museum and visitor attraction design firms; it is headquartered in London.

== History ==
The firm was founded in 1986 by businesswoman Celestine ("Cel") Phelan and design partner Steve Simons. In 2008, a new management team took over the running of Event, led by museum design consultant James Alexander, and creative director Esther Dugdale, which saw the firm expand from its European base to an international focus that included the Middle East (Oman and Kuwait), and latterly Asia (China and Hong Kong).

Event projects have won the major European Museum of the Year Award (EMYA) a number of times, including for the Riverside Museum in Glasgow in 2013, and for the POLIN Museum of the History of Polish Jews in 2016. Event projects have also won other EMYA awards such as the Silletto Prize for the Shipwreck Museum St. George in Denmark in 2019. The firm was also notable as the exhibition designer for the Titanic Belfast visitor attraction which opened in 2012, and which has also won several major international visitor attraction awards including the 2014 THEA award.

Event projects have won notable cultural tourism awards, including the World Travel Awards Europe's Leading Tourist Attraction for the EPIC The Irish Emigration Museum in 2019, for the Titanic Belfast in 2016, and for the Guinness Storehouse in 2015.

Since 2016, Event became associated with "immersive" and "technology-driven" experiences, such as the Meet Vincent Van Gogh Experience, a traveling exhibition created in 2017 with the Van Gogh Museum in Amsterdam, and which also won a 2017 THEA award. Another example being the overhaul of the Hans Christian Andersen Museum in Odense in Denmark, into the House of Fairytales concept, a collaboration with Japanese architect Kengo Kuma, that was set to open in late 2020. Event's EPIC The Irish Emigration Museum was described by the Irish Times as "the world’s first fully digital museum", and was also shortlisted for the European Museum of the Year Award in 2018 (but did not win).

Event has designed attractions for corporate exhibitions and landmark buildings such as The Shard: Viewing Gallery in London, the KAPSARC in Riyadh, the Siemens Crystal in London, and the Expo 2020: Opportunity Pavilion in Dubai.

== Selected works ==
- POLIN Museum of the History of Polish Jews, Warsaw.
- Polytechnic Museum, Moscow.
- Titanic Belfast, Belfast, Northern Ireland.
- EPIC The Irish Emigration Museum, Dublin.
- Siemens Crystal Building, London.
- Riverside Museum, Glasgow.
- Bletchley Park, England.
- Burrell Collection, Glasgow.
- Hans Christian Andersen Museum House of Fairytales, Odense, Denmark.
- The Roman Baths, Bath, England.
- National Army Museum, London.
- Kelvingrove Art Gallery and Museum, Glasgow.
- King Abdullah Petroleum Studies and Research Center (KAPSARC), Riyadh, Saudi Arabia.
- The Shard: Viewing Gallery, London.
- Eden Project, Qingdao, China.
- Guinness Storehouse, Dublin.
- Shipwreck Museum St. George, Denmark.
- St Fagans National Museum of History, Wales.

== Selected awards ==
- European Museum of the Year:
  - EPIC The Irish Emigration Museum, Dublin (2018) – shortlisted, but did not win.
  - POLIN Museum of the History of Polish Jews, Warsaw (2016).
  - Riverside Museum, Glasgow (2013).
  - Chester Beatty Library, Dublin (2003).
  - In Flanders Fields Museum, Ypes (2000).
- European Museum of the Year, Silletto Prize:
  - Shipwreck Museum St. George, Denmark (2019).
- Museum of the Year:
  - St Fagans National Museum of History, Wales (2019).
- Themed Entertainment Association (THEA):
  - Immersive Museum Exhibit: Touring: Meet Vincent van Gogh Experience, Amsterdam (2017).
  - Visitor Centre: Titanic Belfast, Belfast (2014).
  - Europe's Leading Tourist Attraction: EPIC The Irish Immigration Museum, Dublin (2019).
  - World's Leading Tourist Attraction: Titanic Belfast, Belfast (2016).
  - Europe's Leading Tourist Attraction: Titanic Belfast, Belfast (2016).
  - Europe's Leading Tourist Attraction: Guinness Storehouse, Dublin (2015).

== Gallery ==
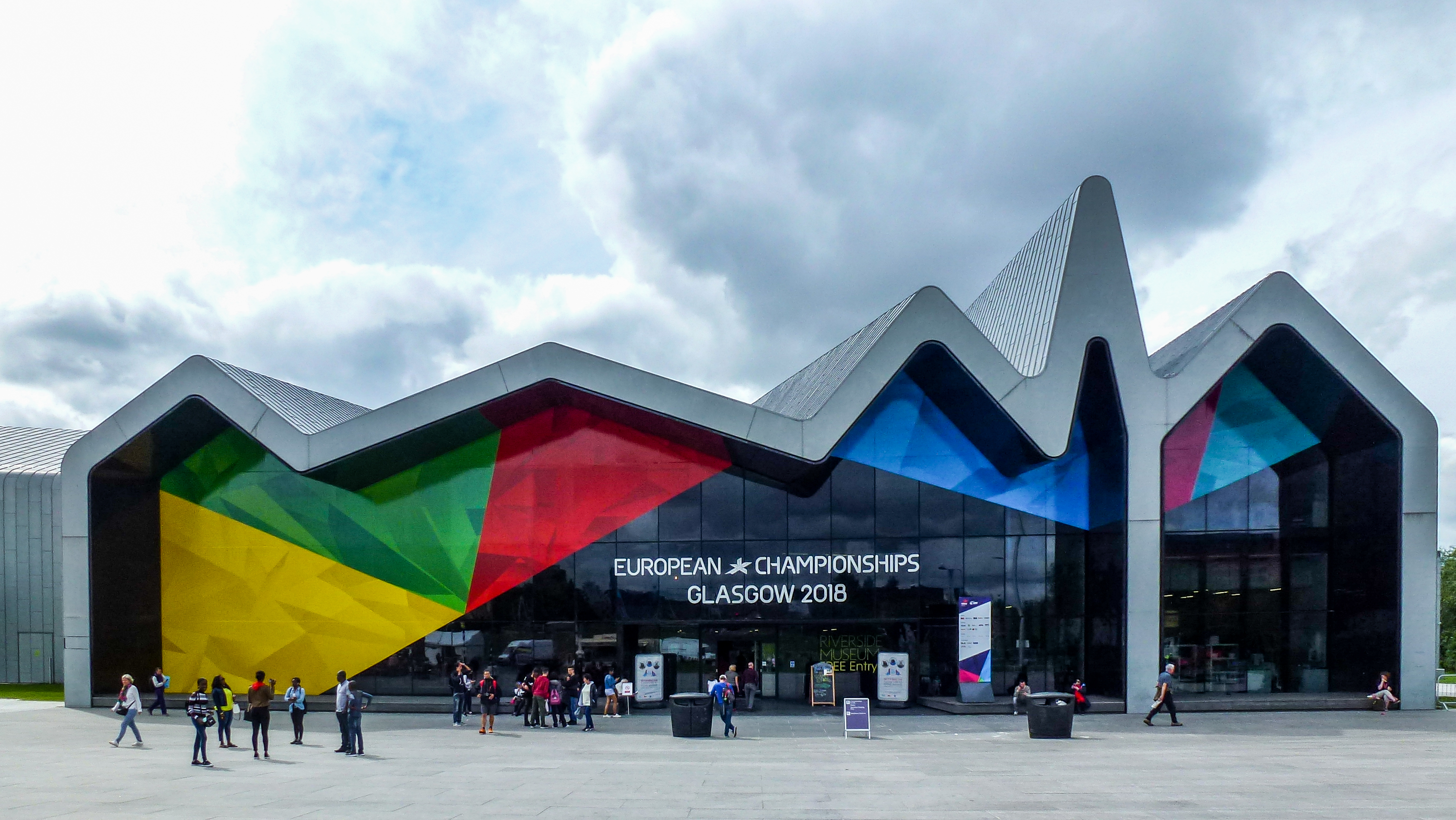
Riverside Museum in Glasgow (2013)

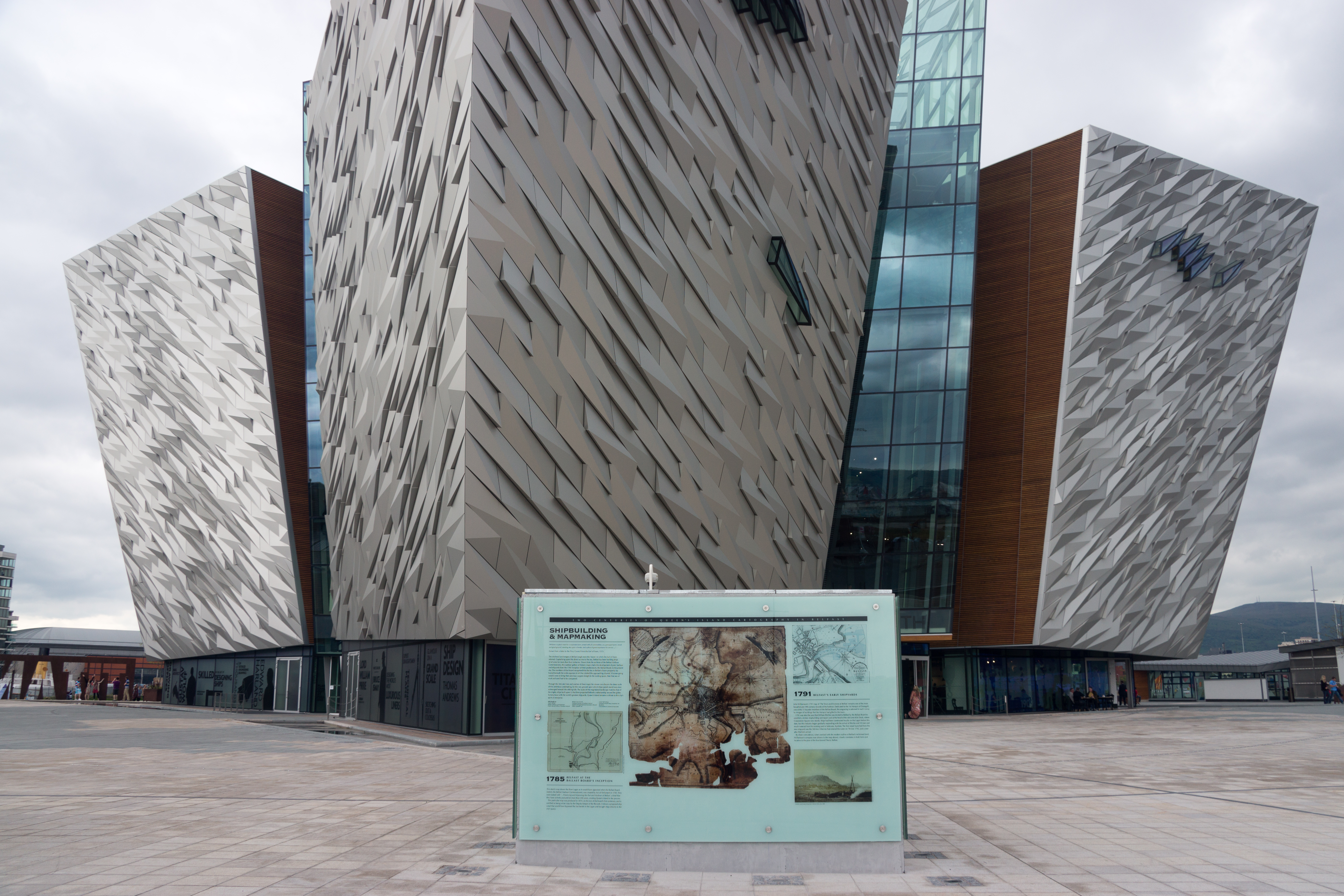
Titanic Belfast in Belfast (2014)

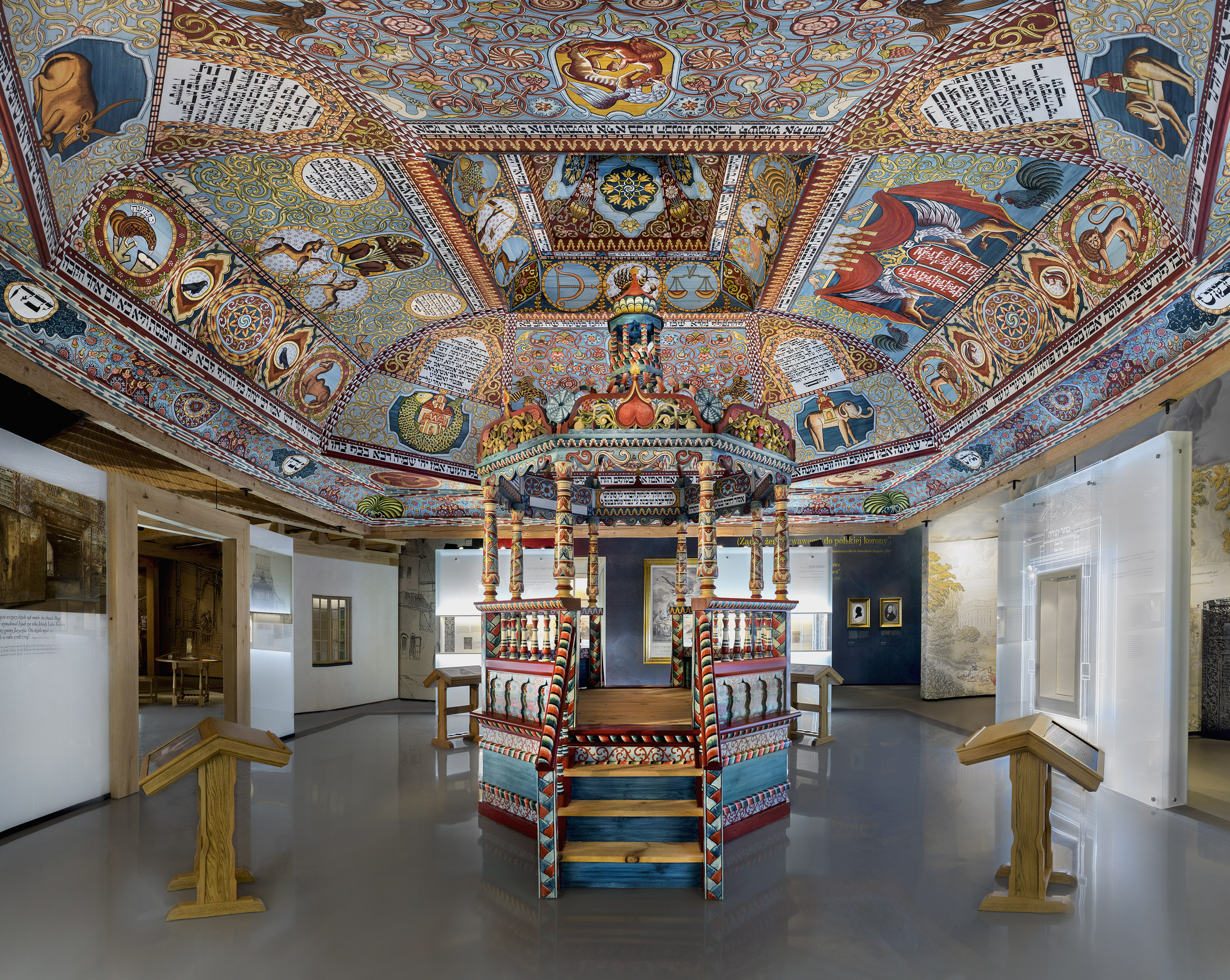
POLIN in Warsaw (2015)

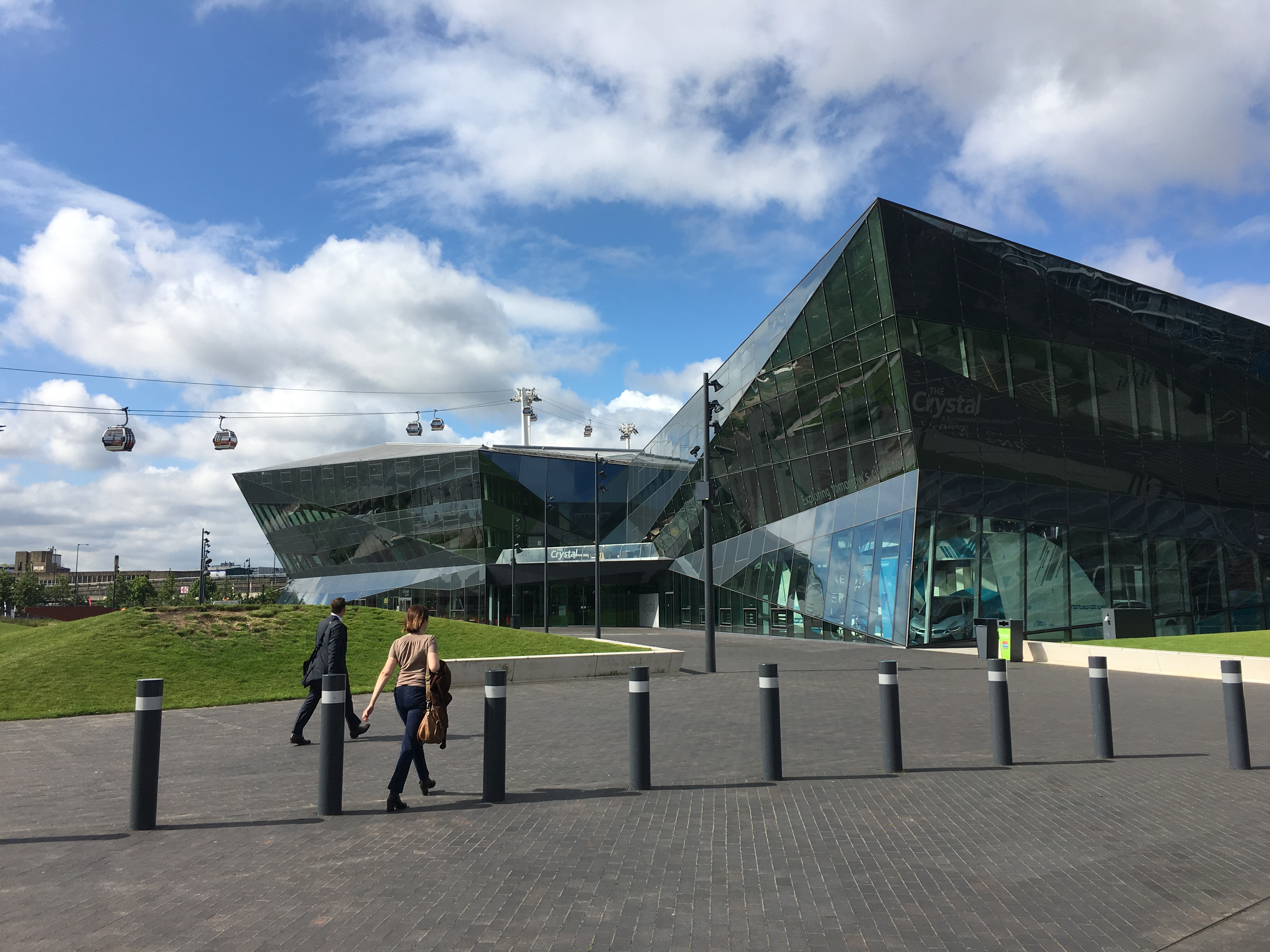
Siemens Crystal in London (2013)

== See also ==
- Ralph Appelbaum Associates, U.S. firm
- Local Projects, U.S. firm
- Gallagher & Associates, U.S. firm
- Cultural tourism
- Exhibit design
- Exhibition designer
