= Guaranteed Irish =

Irish nonprofit business organisation

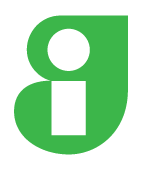
Logo

Guaranteed Irish is an Irish nonprofit business membership organisation representing indigenous and international businesses operating in Ireland. The Guaranteed Irish symbol is awarded to companies which create "quality" jobs, contribute to local communities and are "committed to Irish provenance".

The members of Guaranteed Irish span all sectors including pharmaceutical; healthcare; technology; construction; energy; professional services; tourism; food and drink; art and design; retail; and more. When assessing an applicant for membership, the Appraisals Board of Guaranteed Irish looks at three core criteria; jobs, community and provenance.

According to research published in February 2018, member companies of Guaranteed Irish directly employed 49,873 people in Ireland and generated a turnover of €11 billion in Ireland in 2017. Globally, these companies generated a turnover of €25.84 billion in 2017, with 46% of members exporting, primarily to the UK, US and mainland Europe.

Member companies can use the Guaranteed Irish symbol, a stylised overlay of the letters "g" and "i", on packaging and marketing materials for products and services certified by the organisation as having Irish origin or where at least 50% added value takes place in Ireland.

The original Guaranteed Irish campaign was developed from December 1974 by the Irish Goods Council, originally the Working Group on the Promotion and Sale of Irish Goods within the National Development Association, which was incorporated separately in 1978. The Council's first director, Vivian Murray, was instrumental in the campaign. Spending on the campaign increased from £90,376 in 1976 to £361,491 in 1981. In 1980, 1,000 companies were participating. In 1982, the European Court of Justice ruled that, since the Irish Goods Council received state funding, its Guaranteed Irish campaign contravened the Treaty of Rome's rules against protectionism. As a consequence the campaign was separated from the Irish Goods Council into an independent nonprofit organisation, Guaranteed Irish Limited, which does not receive state funding. It was launched in 1984 by Patrick Hillery, then President of Ireland.

In 2017, led by a new CEO, Brid O’Connell, and a new board of directors and team, the organisation rebranded and repositioned by opening up membership to international companies operating in Ireland. Guaranteed Irish was relaunched by the Taoiseach, Enda Kenny, in March 2017, using the original logo from the campaign's inception.

In February, the inaugural Guaranteed Irish Month, to take place each March, was unveiled at the Irish Stock Exchange by Ciaran Cannon, T.D., Minister of State at the Department of Foreign Affairs and Trade with special responsibility for the Diaspora and International Development, and Deirdre Somers, CEO of the Irish Stock Exchange.

As a non-profit organisation, Guaranteed Irish is entirely funded through membership fees which is used to actively promote Guaranteed Irish businesses through online and offline PR and marketing activities. The organisation currently has 300 members with plans to increase the number of member companies to 500 by the end of 2018. In April 2018, Guaranteed Irish launched a new website.

On 15 March 2023, the Guaranteed Irish Person of the Year Award for 2023 was given to Ryan Tubridy, with the presenter described as having "long been a supporter of Guaranteed Irish" and highlighting "his continued championing of Irish business, support of Irish brands, and overall embodiment of the core values of Guaranteed Irish".
