= Guinness Storehouse =

Tourist and visitor attraction, Dublin

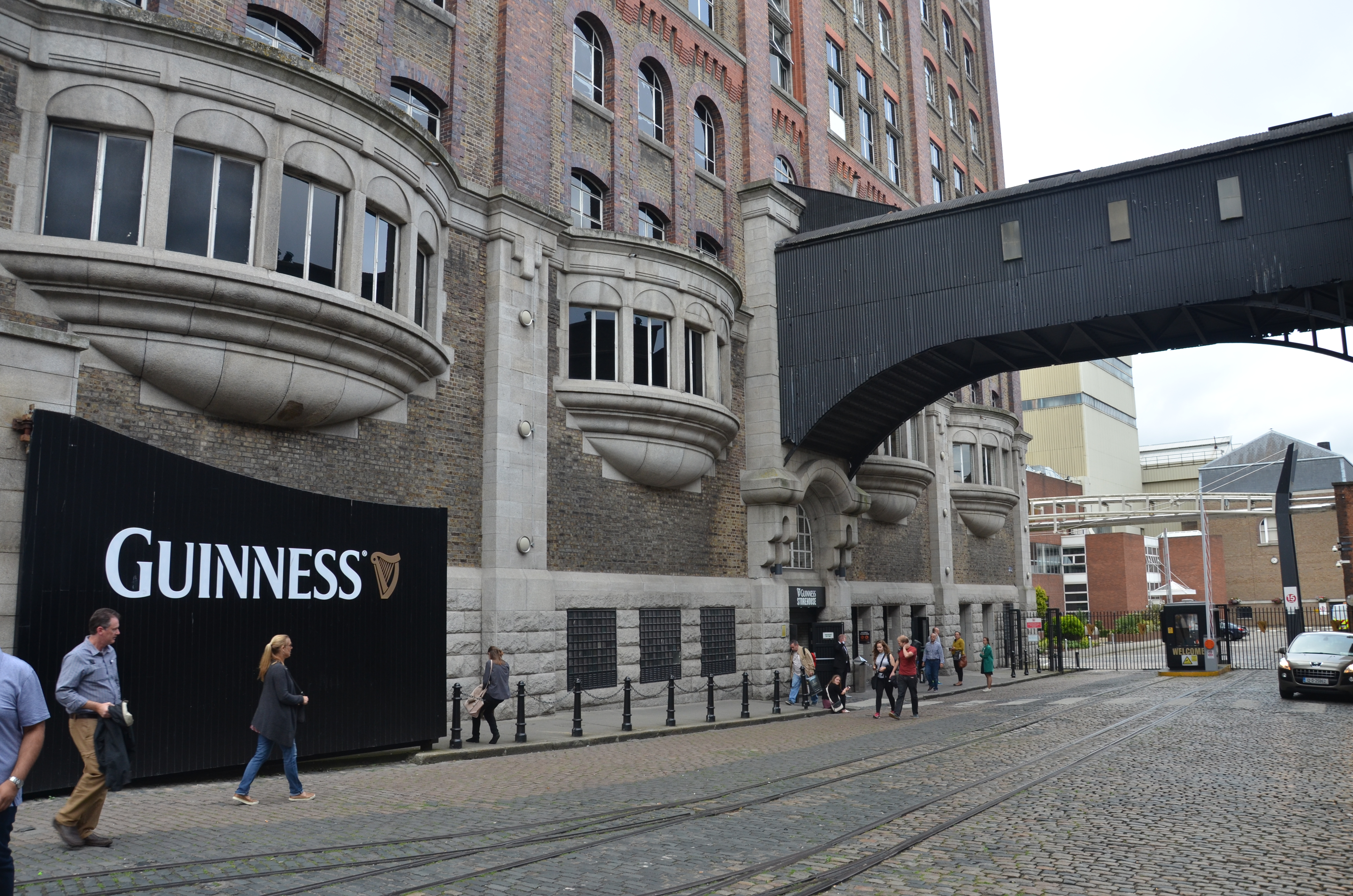
- Guinness Storehouse in Dublin
- Established: November 2000; 25 years ago
- Location: Guinness Brewery, Dublin, Ireland
- Coordinates: 53°20′30.7464″N 6°17′12.1535″W
- Type: History of brewing
- Visitors: 23.9 million (2000 - 2022)
- Owner: Diageo
- Website: www.guinness-storehouse.com

Guinness Storehouse is a tourist attraction at St. James's Gate Brewery in Dublin, Ireland. Since opening in 2000, it has received over twenty million visitors.

The Storehouse covers seven floors surrounding a glass atrium shaped in the form of a pint of Guinness. The ground floor introduces the beer's four ingredients (water, barley, hops and yeast), and the brewery's founder, Arthur Guinness. Other floors feature the history of Guinness advertising and include an interactive exhibit on responsible drinking. The seventh floor houses the Gravity Bar with views of Dublin and where visitors may drink a pint of Guinness included in the price of most admission tickets.

== History ==
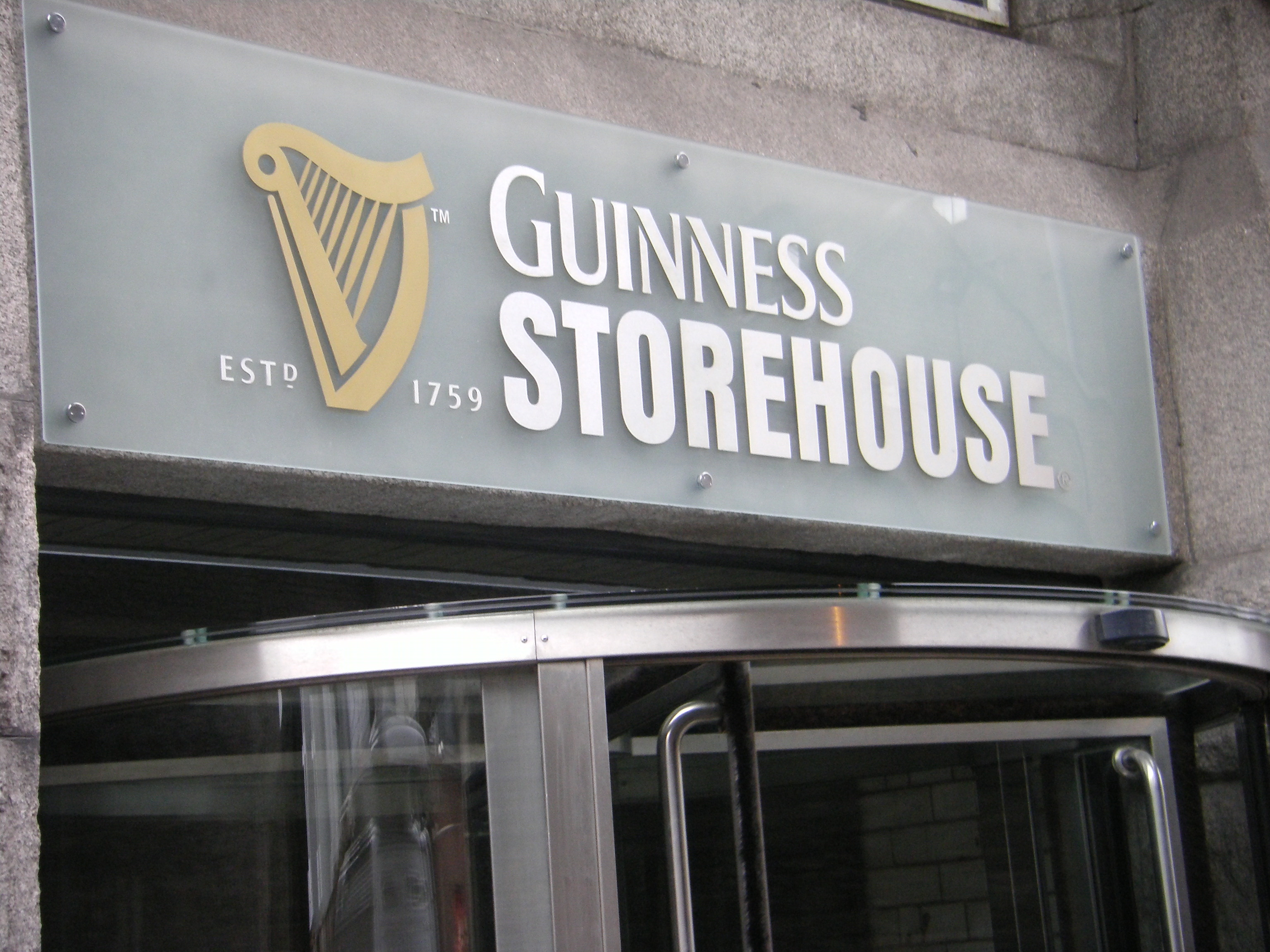
The entrance to the Storehouse

The building in which the Storehouse is located was constructed in 1902 as a fermentation plant for the St. James's Gate Brewery (yeast is added to the brew). It was designed in the style of the Chicago School of Architecture and was the first multi-storey steel-framed building to be constructed in Ireland. The building was used continuously as the fermentation plant of the Brewery until its closure in 1988, when a new fermentation plant was completed near the River Liffey.

In 1997, it was decided to convert the building into the Guinness Storehouse, replacing the Guinness Hop Store as the Brewery's visitor centre. The redesign of the building was undertaken by the UK-based design firm Imagination in conjunction with the Dublin-based architects firm RKD, and the Storehouse opened to the public on 2 December 2000. In 2006-08 a new wing was developed, and Euro 2.5 million was invested in a live technology-driven multi-media installation demonstrating the modern brewing process for Guinness, which was designed by London-based museum design specialist, Event Communications.

In May 2011, Queen Elizabeth II and Prince Philip visited the Storehouse as part of a state visit to Ireland.

== Visitor attractions ==
The Guinness Storehouse explains the history of beer. The story is told through various interactive exhibition areas including ingredients, brewing, transport, cooperage, advertising, and sponsorship.

The Storehouse covers seven floors surrounding a glass atrium shaped in the form of a pint of Guinness. The ground floor introduces the beer's four ingredients (water, barley, hops, and yeast), and the brewery's founder, Arthur Guinness. Other floors feature the history of Guinness advertising and include an interactive exhibit on responsible drinking.

At the base of the atrium lies a copy of the 9,000-year lease signed by Arthur Guinness on the brewery site. In the Perfect Pint bar, visitors may pour their own pint of Guinness and even get their selfie printed on top of a pint. The Brewery Bar on the fifth floor offers Irish cuisine, using Guinness both in the cooking and as an accompaniment to food. The seventh-floor houses the Gravity Bar with views of Dublin and where visitors may drink a pint of Guinness. Most of the admission tickets include one pint in the price.

The Guinness Open Gate Brewery is an experimental taproom nearby, showcasing small-batch beer creations from the Guinness brewery.

The Storehouse also contains the Guinness Archives, containing records and artifacts dating back to 1759.

== See also ==
- List of food and beverage museums
