= Chetney Hill =

Planned lazaret in Kent, England

Coordinates: 51.3969°N 0.7039°E

Chetney Hill was a planned lazaret on the banks of the River Medway estuary in Kent. Inspired by European ports such as Marseille and Venice, it was intended to act as a quarantine for incoming ships in times of epidemic disease. The construction was beset by many problems, even when the experienced engineer John Rennie was brought in to complete the project and its associated canal. As such, the lazaret was never completed, and the materials sold off.
