= Wendy Isdell =

American novelist

- Born: March 30, 1975 (age 51); Richmond, Virginia
- Occupation: Author
- Website: wendyisdell.com

Wendy Diane Isdell (born March 30, 1975) is an American author and artist. She is best known for her young adult works, which incorporate science and math into fiction. Her most popular novel, A Gebra Named Al, was first published in 1993.

== Career ==
Isdell dedicated much of her early life to writing. Her first notable publishing credit came at age nine, through articles in the Haydon Elementary School newsletter (the first ever by a student). Seven years later, she signed a contract for her first novel, A Gebra Named Al, with Free Spirit Publishing in Minneapolis, Minnesota. The sequel was published two years later.

Isdell was also a pioneer of the internet, having developed websites as early as November 1994. (However, the Internet Archive project has records for her original website dating back only to 1999, the older records presumably having been lost.) She was a contributor for early versions of DreamingGates.com, experimenting with javascript and css to create a rudimentary shopping cart as early as 1999.

== Education ==
Isdell graduated summa cum laude in 1997 from Hofstra University with a B.A. in creative arts, then summa cum laude from Mary Washington University in 2004 with an M.A. in general studies. She went on to obtain a Doctorate of Divinity and Ph.D. in religion.

== Personal ==
Isdell currently lives in Virginia, and is a supporter of gay and transsexual equality. For health reasons, she rarely ventures out.

== Bibliography ==
- A Gebra Named Al (Free Spirit, 1994) ISBN 978-0-915793-58-7
- Using A Gebra Named Al in the Classroom (Free Spirit, 1994)
- The Chemy Called Al (Free Spirit, 19396; Lulu Press, 2006) ISBN 0-915793-96-2
- Using The Chemy Called Al in the Classroom (Free Spirit, 1996; Lulu Press, 2006)
