= National Digital Research Centre =

National venture "accelerator" programme in Ireland

Coordinates: 53.342171°N 6.283727°W

In Ireland, the National Digital Research Centre is a national accelerator programme for entrepreneurs. It is delivered by a consortium led by Dublin-based Dogpatch Labs, and supported by multiple venture capital firms. It offers a "mentorship-driven" approach, with €100,000 "founder-friendly" funding, and early stage supports including non-equity pre-accelerator programmes available to entrepreneurs across Ireland. It also runs a Masterclass Series for companies working in the start-up space, teaching them how to support young digital venture teams with significant scale potential. It succeeded a previous version of the concept, run by a team on behalf of five Irish third-level institutions.

== History ==
The National Digital Research Centre was established in 2007 by a group of educational institutions operating under an agreement with the Minister for Communications, Climate Action and Environment. Once it no longer carried out research, it referred to itself as NDRC only. In September 2013, the market value of firms emerging from the centre was reported to have doubled to €39m during 2012.

In November 2020, the existing management team confirmed that they had lost the tender to run the NDRC, and that the organisation would be wound up. New operators, Dogpatch Labs and its regional partners, were appointed on a contract worth up to 17 million euro.

== Ownership and management ==
=== Initial operation ===
From foundation until November 2020, the centre was owned and operated by a consortium of three Irish research universities and two other third-level bodies: Dublin City University, Dún Laoghaire Institute of Art, Design and Technology, the National College of Art and Design, Trinity College, Dublin, and University College Dublin.

NDRC invested primarily using an accelerator model, providing modest amounts of capital and high amounts of hands-on support to early stage companies. It ran two investment programmes: NDRC LaunchPad and NDRC VentureLab. It was awarded "Top IT" incubator by UBI Index in 2013. NDRC LaunchPad was ranked as one of the most highly rated accelerators in Europe

=== New operation ===
The process to put the operation of the NDRC to tender was announced in late 2019. After a competitive bid process between the incumbent, Dogpatch Labs and Sean O’Sullivan's SOSV, in December 2020 the Government announced that it had awarded the five year €17M contract to manage the service to Dogpatch Labs.

Dogpatch Labs operates the NDRC with its regional partners RDI Hub (Kerry), Republic of Work (Cork) and Portershed (Galway), and it is supported by five venture capital firms with Irish bases - Act Venture Capital, Atlantic Bridge, Frontline, Delta Partners, and Polaris Partners. Invitations for the first batch of start-ups to be funded under the accelerator programme, numbering 12, were opened in March 2021. Aside from financing and mentoring, the package of supports to be provided included free office space for a year.

== Beneficiaries ==
NDRC alumni include Nuritas, Soundwave, Boxever (acquired by Sitecore), and Silvercloud Health.

== See also ==
- Paddy Nixon, co-founder
