= E. Neville Isdell =

Irish businessman

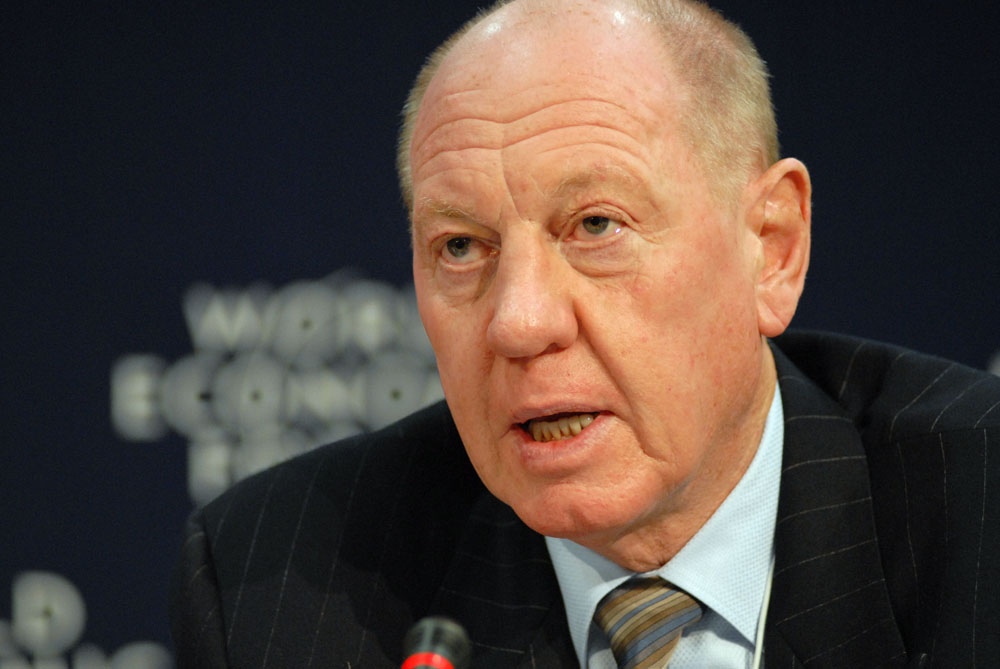
- Isdell in 2008
- Born: Edward Neville Isdell; 8 June 1943 (age 83); Downpatrick, Northern Ireland
- Known for: Chair and CEO, The Coca-Cola Company

Edward Neville Isdell (born 8 June 1943) is an Irish businessman, former chair and CEO of The Coca-Cola Company and former president of the WWF.

== Early life and career ==
Isdell moved to Zambia at the age of ten, and joined the Coca-Cola Company in 1966 with the local bottling company there. In 1972, he became general manager of Coca-Cola Bottling of Johannesburg, the largest Coca-Cola bottler in Africa. Isdell was named region manager for Australia in 1980, and in 1981 he became president of the bottling joint venture between The Coca-Cola Company and San Miguel Corporation in the Philippines, where he oversaw the turnaround and renewal of the Coca-Cola business in that key country.

Isdell moved to (Germany) as president of the Company's Central European Division in 1985. In 1989, he was elected senior vice president of the Company and appointed president of the Northeast Europe/Africa Group (renamed the Northeast Europe/Middle East Group in 1992) and led the Company's entry into new markets in India, the Middle East, Eastern Europe and the former Soviet Union. In 1995, he was named president of the Greater Europe Group.

From July 1998 to September 2000, Isdell was chairman and CEO of Coca-Cola Beverages Plc in Great Britain, where he oversaw that company's merger with Hellenic Bottling to form the world's second largest Coca-Cola bottler at the time, Coca-Cola Hellenic Bottling Company (HBC). He retired as vice chairman of Coca-Cola HBC in December 2001. From January 2002 to May 2004, Isdell was an international consultant to The Coca-Cola Company and headed his own investment company in Barbados.

Isdell was chairman (2004–2009) and chief executive officer (2004–2008) of Coca-Cola. While CEO of Coca-Cola in 2007, Isdell earned a total compensation of $21,648,740, which included a base salary of $1,612,500, a cash bonus of $6,649,500, stocks granted of $5,200,017, and options granted of $7,369,657.

Isdell is interim president of the World Wildlife Fund's international board of trustees and is on the board of a number of other charities. He has been on a number of corporate boards including General Motors and British Telecom. He holds five honorary doctorates and is a recipient of the Clinton Foundation Global Citizen Award. He is based together with his business interests in Barbados.

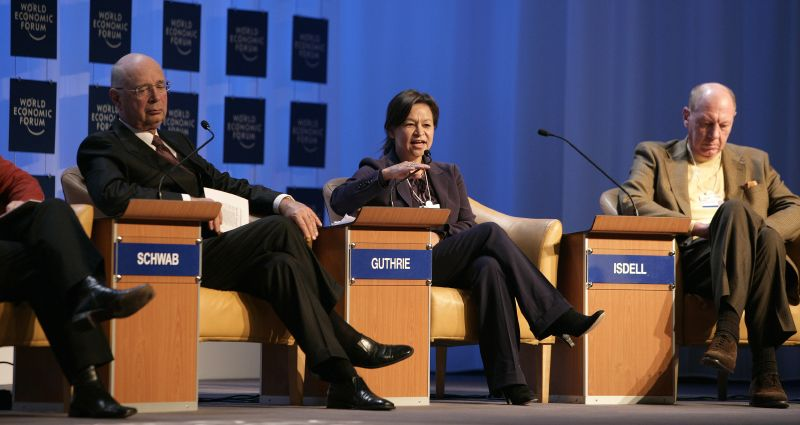
Klaus Schwab, Michelle Guthrie, E. Neville Isdell on the World Economic Forum Annual Meeting Davos 2007.

== Education ==
Isdell earned a bachelor's degree in Social Science from the University of Cape Town and graduated from the Harvard Business School program for Management Development. He was awarded an honorary doctorate degree from Georgia State University.

== Legacy ==
In 2011, Isdell donated $1 million to the rugby club of the University of Cape Town, of which he is an alumnus.

In 2013, Isdell acquired the CHQ Building for €10 million, inside of which in 2016 he funded and launched EPIC The Irish Emigration Museum.

In 2023, Isdell donated US$1.5 million to the University of Cape Town towards the Holistic Drug Discovery and Development Centre (H3D).

Business positions
Preceded by Douglas Daft	CEO of The Coca-Cola Company; 2004–2008	Succeeded by Muhtar Kent
Preceded by Douglas Daft	Chairman of The Coca-Cola Company; 2004–2009	Succeeded by Muhtar Kent
