= Almeta Crawford High School =

High school in Fort Bend County, Texas

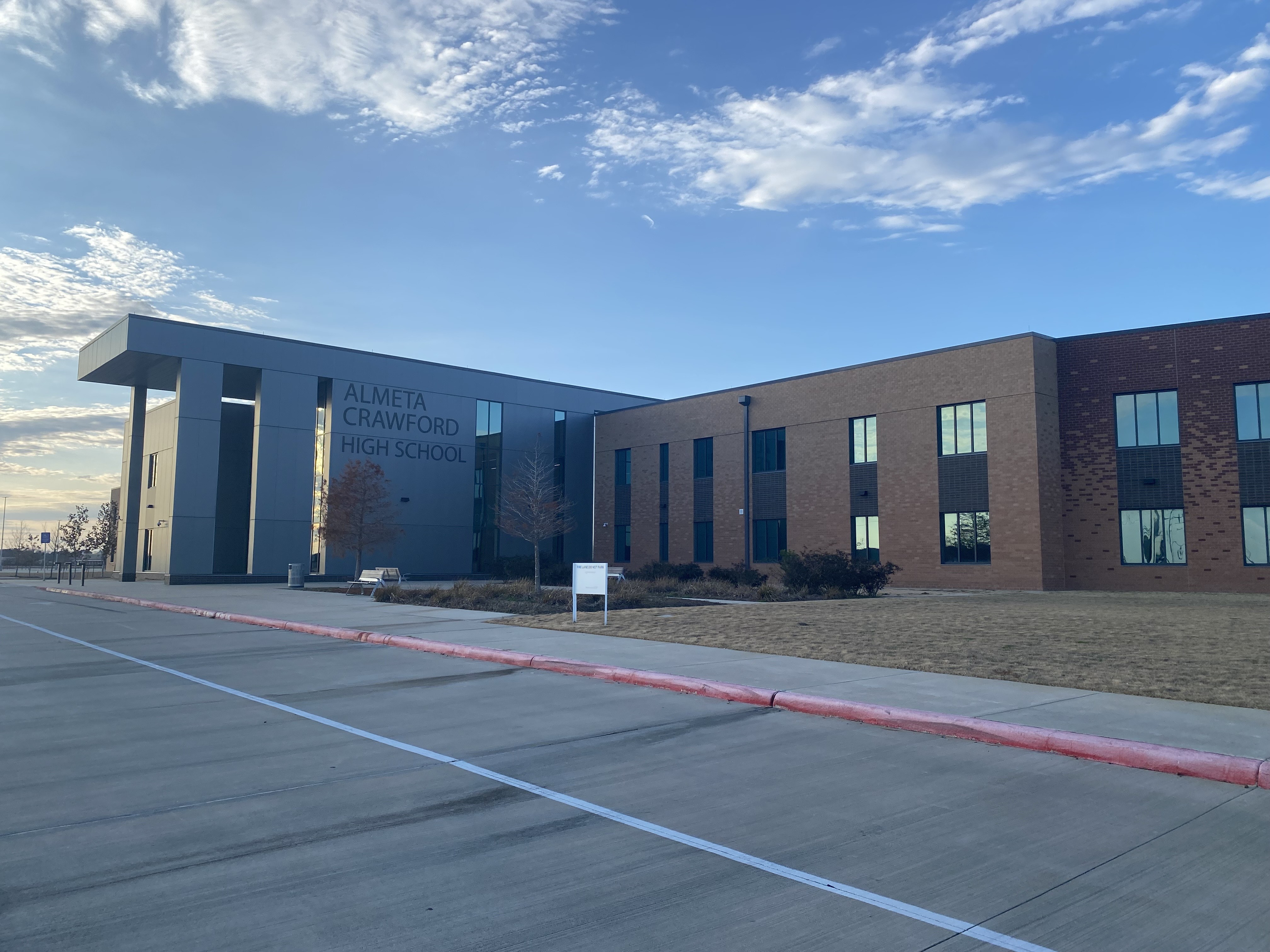
- Crawford High School in 2026

Location
- 801 Caldwell Ranch Blvd; Rosharon postal address, Fort Bend County, Texas 77583; United States

Information
- School type: Public high school
- Opened: August 9, 2023
- School district: Fort Bend Independent School District
- NCES District ID: 4819650
- Educational authority: Texas Education Agency
- NCES School ID: 481965013932
- Principal: Amber Grady
- Grades: 9–12
- Area: 485,000 sq ft (45,100 m^{2})
- Colors: Teal, white, and gray
- Mascot: Chargers
- Website: achs.fortbendisd.gov

Almeta Crawford High School, also known simply as Crawford High School, is a public high school in Fort Bend County, Texas. Located near Farm to Market Road 521 and south of State Highway 6, just adjacent to Sienna, Texas, the school opened in the fall of 2023. The school, as Fort Bend Independent School District's (FBISD) 12th consecutive high school, will initially consist of 9th and 10th graders in its inaugural year, with the first graduating class expected to be the class of 2026.

The school has a Rosharon postal address, though it is not in the Rosharon census-designated place.

Its attendance boundary includes the following: portions of Arcola south of Texas State Highway 6, portions of the Sienna census-designated place, and the unincorporated area of Juliff.

== History ==
Crawford High School was envisioned by FBISD as a method of alleviating overcrowding at Sienna's Ridge Point High School, which opened a decade earlier in 2010. The school will divert students away from RPHS, in addition to Hightower High School, which since mid-2020 had enrolled students previously zoned to Ridge Point, again to combat the latter's excess. The school was initially planned to open for the 2022-2023 school year, however, due to COVID-related construction delays, the district has pushed back its inauguration to the 2023-2024 school year.

Almeta Crawford, who is ACHS's eponym, was a long-time employee at FBISD, serving for under half a century working at the district, mostly at Dulles High School. In March 2021, Keith Fickel, principal of Sugar Land Middle School, was declared to be the school's upcoming principal. On April 7, 2022, the school's mascot was revealed: the chargers.

The attendance boundaries for the school were established during the 2022 fall semester. The school was opened on August 9, 2023, with Marquis Bordeaux being the first student to step foot in the school.

Seven days following the school's opening, on August 16, a student was arrested when a gun was found in their backpack. The incident led to greater calls for an increased police presence in FBISD.

== Campus ==
At 485,000 square feet (45,100 m^{2}), the school is the largest in FBISD to date. The district stated that it will be constructed to environmentally sound, green standards. The school features "learning communities", featuring a combination of classrooms, laboratories, specialized classes, a multi-purpose room, and collaboration ideas. The school is structured in a V-esque shape, with a central courtyard separating the learning communities from the commons, fine art facilities, auditorium, and career and technical education facilities. The campus has three on site gyms, a practice and competition field respectively, a softball field, and a baseball field, in addition to a large field house.
