= Houston Tap and Brazoria Railway =

Overview
- Headquarters: Houston
- Locale: Southeast Texas
- Dates of operation: 1856–1873
- Predecessor: Houston Tap Railroad
- Successor: Houston and Great Northern Railroad

Technical
- Track gauge: 4 ft 8 1/2 in (1,435 mm) standard gauge
- Length: 50 miles (80 km)

The Houston Tap and Brazoria Railway was chartered in September 1856 to extend southward from Houston to West Columbia in Brazoria County. The railroad's nicknames were the Columbia Tap and the Sugar Road. The railway absorbed track from an earlier short-lived line and reached West Columbia in 1860. After the American Civil War, the railroad ran into serious financial difficulties and was sold to the Houston and Great Northern Railroad. It was the only railroad that failed to repay money borrowed from the Special School Fund and the only railroad that could trace its title to the State of Texas. The line operated as part of the Missouri Pacific Railroad until 1980 when it was bought by the Union Pacific Railroad. In 2014, the part of the line closest to downtown Houston existed only as the Columbia Tap Rail-Trail, the portion of the line between Houston and Arcola was still in service and the section between Arcola and West Columbia was abandoned.

== History ==
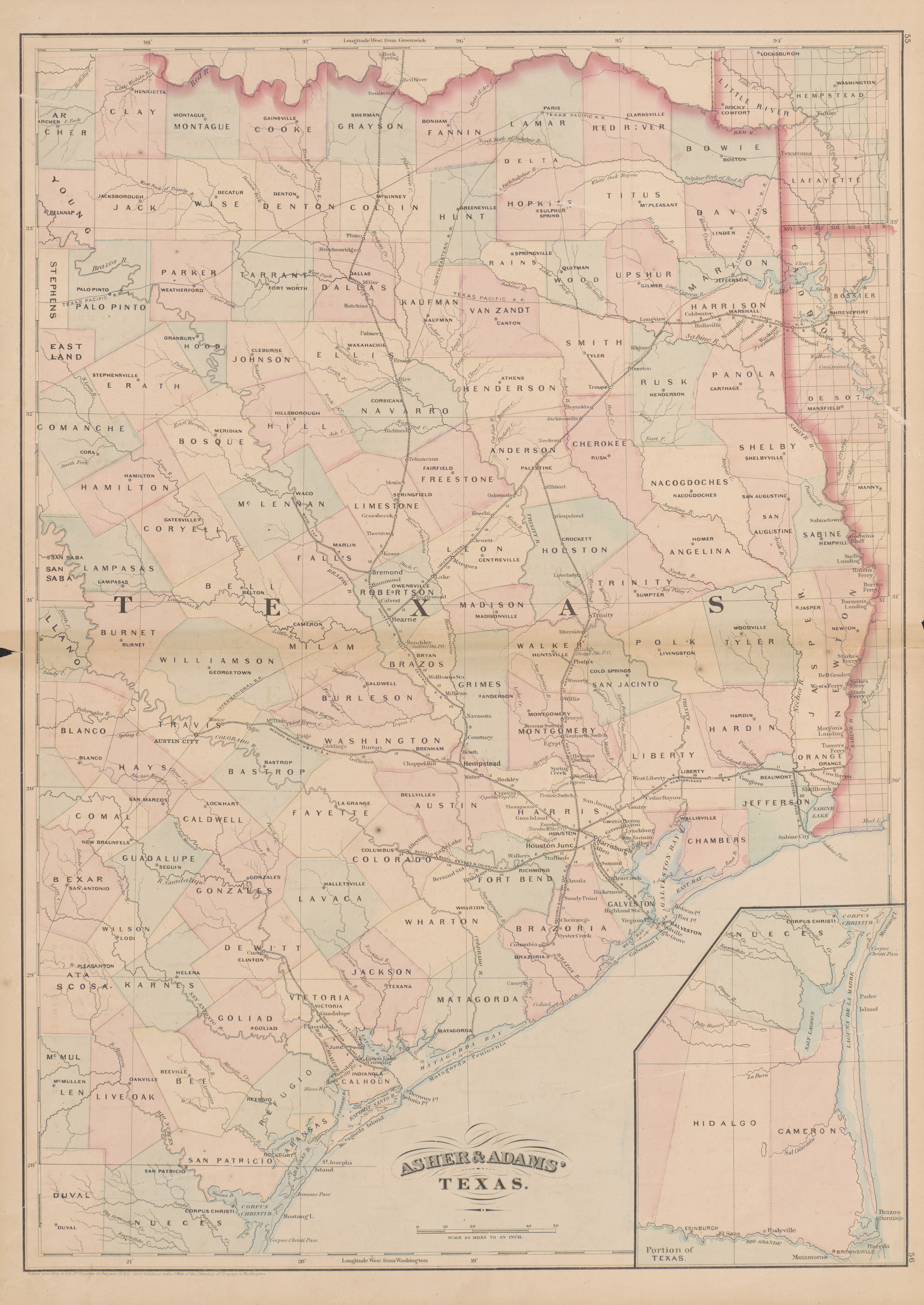
1871 map showing the Houston Tap and Brazoria Railway in Texas, along with other railroads

In 1850 the Buffalo Bayou, Brazos and Colorado Railroad was chartered and in 1852 the company started construction. In 1853 the line reached Stafford and by January 1, 1856 the railroad ran from Harrisburg to Richmond. Worried that their city was being bypassed, the authorities in Houston desired to connect their city with Richmond by tapping into the B.B.B.&C. This was accomplished by building 7 miles (11 km) of the Houston Tap Railroad from Houston south to Pierce Junction. Originally known as Peirce Junction, this location was named for Thomas Wentworth Peirce, a wealthy businessman who owned a plantation near Arcola.

Incorporated on September 1, 1856, Houston Tap and Brazoria Railway was authorized to start in Houston and run south to West Columbia, then called Columbia. The charter also called for the line to continue from Columbia into Wharton County and to take over existing track from the Houston Tap Railroad. Construction on the Houston Tap started on April 7, 1856 and the completed line opened on October 21. The Houston Tap and Brazoria Railway purchased the Houston Tap from the city of Houston in June 1858 for $130,000 in stock and a loan of $42,000. The $42,000 loan was to be made once the railroad got its own loan from the state's Special School Fund. Houston was responsible for repayment of the loan. The line reached Sandy Point in 1859 and East Columbia in 1860.

== Present day right-of-way ==
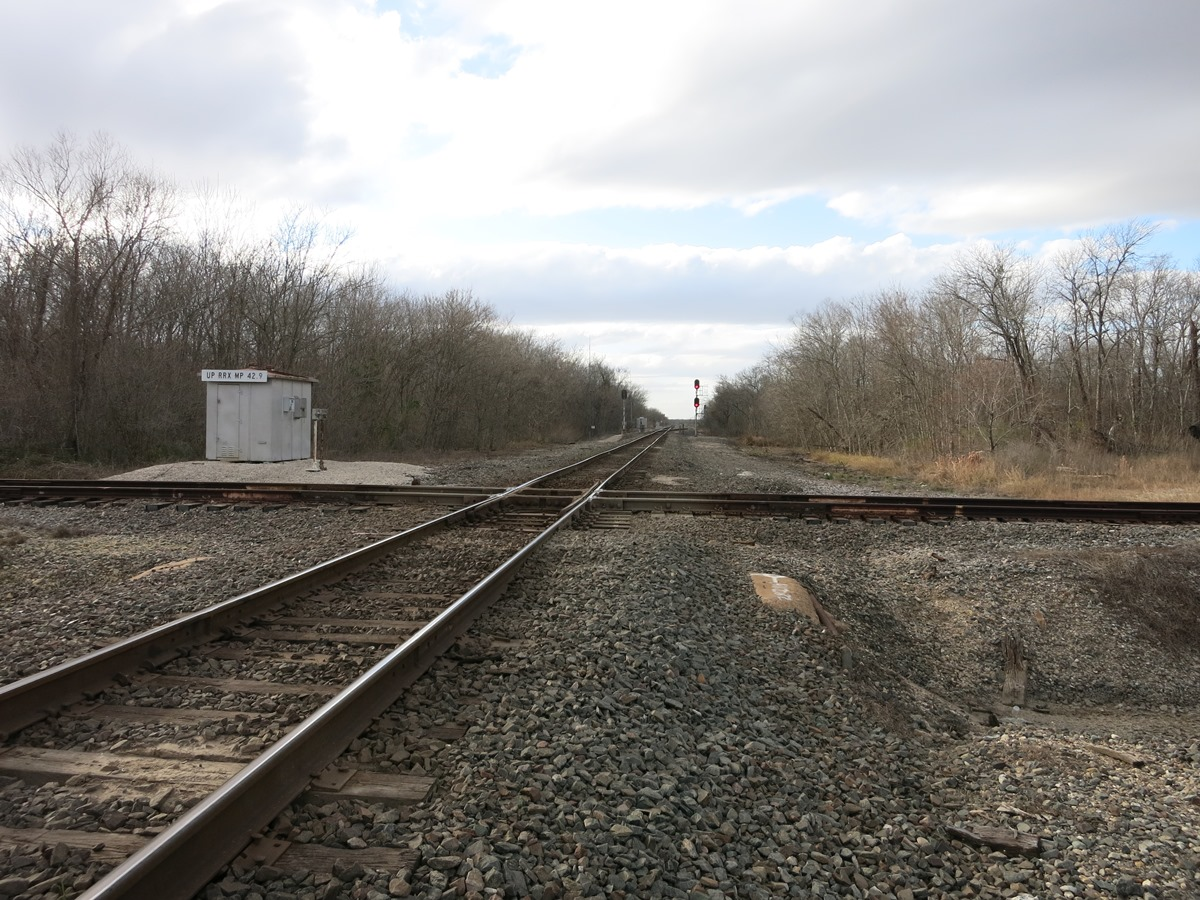
Diamond cross where the BNSF Railway intersects the ex-Missouri Pacific in Arcola, Texas. The view is to the west along the BNSF from the grade crossing at FM 521.

A hike and bike trail in Houston is called the Columbia Tap Rail-Trail. It starts at Dowling and Walker Streets near downtown Houston and heads to the southeast. The trail turns southwest along Velasco Street and continues in the same direction under Interstate 45, past Texas Southern University, across Braes Bayou and ends at State Highway 288 (South Freeway) and Dixie Drive.

The railroad terminus is located at 3131 Holcombe Blvd. a short distance south of the trail's end. From there, the line continues southwest across U.S. 90 Alternate before curving to the south-southwest so that it parallels Farm to Market Road 521 (FM 521) or Almeda Road. Without deviating from the same heading, the railroad tracks follow FM 521 under Interstate 610, through Central Southwest Houston, under State Highway Beltway 8, through Fresno and end just south of Arcola. At Arcola, the line connects with the east-west BNSF Railway. The former right-of-way ran along FM 521 from Arcola south through Juliff, Sandy Point, Rosharon, Bonney, Chenango, and Anchor. At Anchor, the line curved to the southwest and then west, parallel with State Highway 35, before reaching West Columbia.
