= Hawdon, Texas =

Place in Fort Bend County, Texas

Coordinates: 29°28′43.85″N 95°28′20.79″W

Hawdon was a town and rail station in Fort Bend County, Texas, United States, alternately known as Howden, Hawdon Junction, and Arcola. It was located just north of Juliff, and south of Arcola. It was served by the International–Great Northern Railroad via the Columbia Branch. A rail switch was located at Hawdon to connect the Sugar Land Railroad near the (still extant) Palestine Missionary Baptist Church to House Junction. Passenger service ended in 1920, but the rail line through town lasted until the 1980s. The main road through town is Farm to Market Road 521.

A church cemetery served the community at one time, but it has not been located.
