= Fresno, Texas =

- Census-designated place
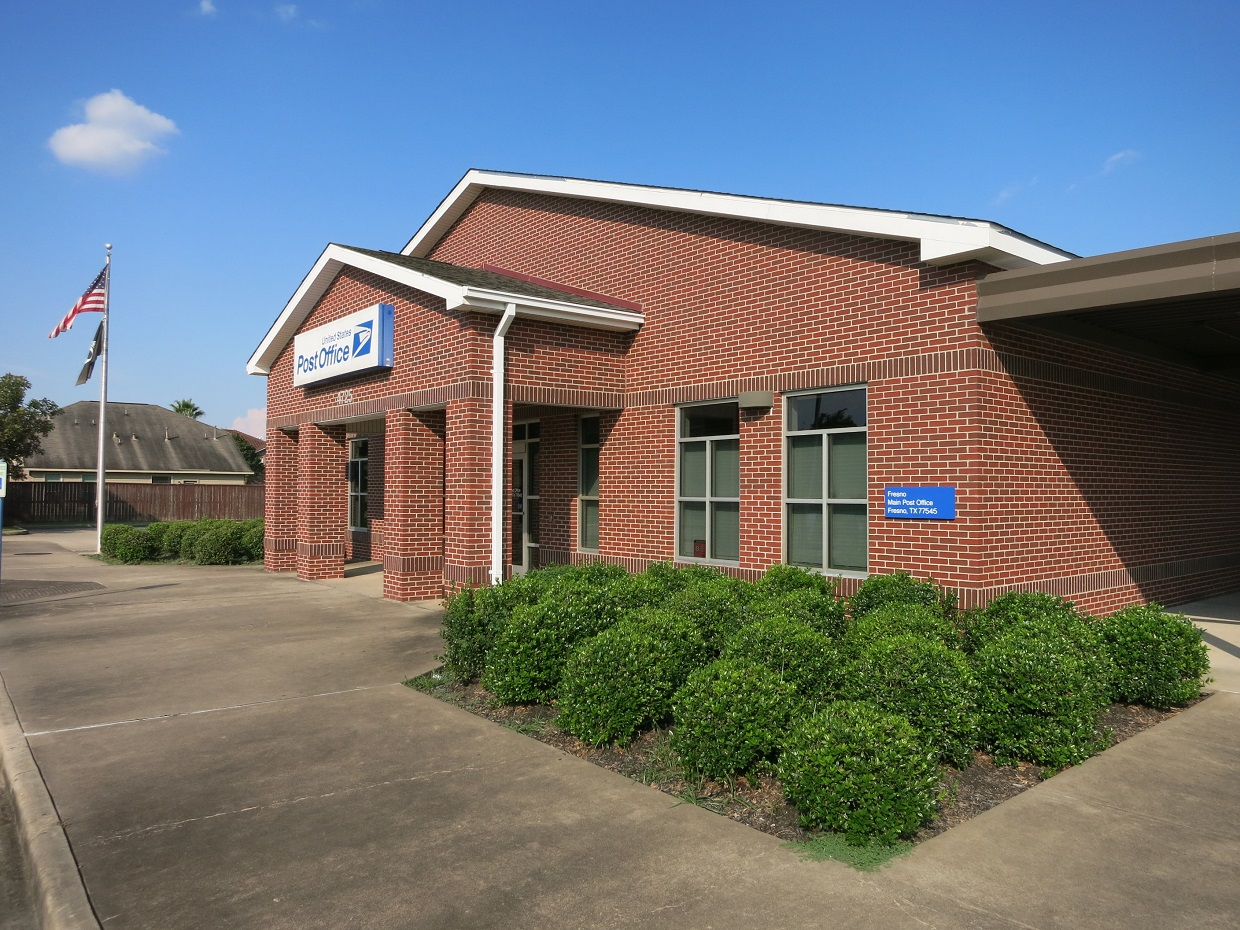
- US Post Office, Fresno, Texas

- Location of Fresno, Texas
- Coordinates: 29°31′36″N 95°27′35″W
- Country: United States
- State: Texas
- County: Fort Bend
- Named for: Fresno, CA

Area
  - Total: 9.3 sq mi (24.1 km^{2})
  - Land: 9.2 sq mi (23.8 km^{2})
  - Water: 0.12 sq mi (0.3 km^{2})
- Elevation: 72 ft (22 m)

Population (2020)
  - Total: 24,486
  - Density: 2,630/sq mi (1,016/km^{2})
- Time zone: UTC-6 (Central (CST))
  - Summer (DST): UTC-5 (CDT)
- ZIP code: 77545
- Area code: 281
- FIPS code: 48-27540
- GNIS feature ID: 1336203

Fresno is a part of Houston and an unincorporated community and census-designated place (CDP) in Fort Bend County, Texas, United States. The local population was 24,486 as of the 2020 census, an increase over the figure of 19,069 tabulated in 2010 census, and 6,603 at the 2000 census.

Fresno is located in the extra-territorial jurisdiction (ETJ) of Houston, which is the fourth largest city in the nation in population.

Fresno is located south of Houston, with the suburban Fort Bend County cities of Missouri City to the west and northwest, Arcola to the south and southwest, and the Brazoria County city of Pearland to the east.

== Geography ==
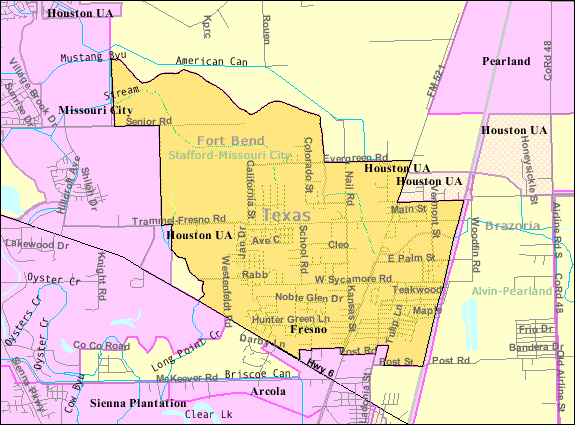
Map of Fresno CDP

Fresno is located in eastern Fort Bend County at 29°31′36″N 95°27′35″W (29.526728, -95.459849). The eastern edge of Fresno is the Brazoria County line. Downtown Houston is 17 miles (27 km) to the north, the center of Missouri City is 11 miles (18 km) to the northwest, the center of Pearland is 11 miles (18 km) to the east, and Manvel is 9 miles (14 km) to the southeast.

According to the United States Census Bureau, the Fresno CDP has a total area of 9.3 square miles (24.1 km^{2}), of which 9.2 square miles (23.8 km^{2}) is land and 0.1 square miles (0.3 km^{2}), or 1.35%, is water.

== History ==
A settler from Fresno, California, reportedly chose the name. The town is on land patented in 1880 once surrounded by cotton plantations. Fresno acquired a post office in 1910. In 1914 it had a telephone connection, a general store, a hardware store, and a population of 32. By 1933 the town had only ten inhabitants and one business. In 1936 it had three rows of dwellings on both sides of a paved highway (old Hwy 288, present day FM 521) and was served by the International-Great Northern Railroad. By 1946 the population had risen to 100, a level maintained throughout the 1960s. In 1970 the figure had increased to 120; two years later it had grown to 161. During the 1970s and 1980s the population of Fresno increased more rapidly as the area was affected by growth of Houston.

=== Growth in the 1990s and 2000s ===
Among the largest communities in Fresno are the six neighborhoods that make up the Fort Bend MUD #23 area. Teal Run, the oldest of the neighborhoods, was originally started in the 1980s, and development stopped with the Houston oil crash in the late 1980s. Construction in the subdivision started again in 1992.

Teal Run North (Villages of Teal Run and Teal Run Meadows), located just off Teal Bend Boulevard, directly adjacent to both Teal Run and Teal Run Estates, was started in 2001. There are over 3,100 total homes in the Fort Bend MUD #23 area in 2006.

NewPoint Estates, located across from Teal Run on Highway 6 and Darby Road, is an area for acreage-type home sites, stables and expensive properties. Winfield Lakes, which is located on Trammel Fresno Road, was started in 2004. Andover Farms, which is located on Highway 6 and South Post Oak Road, was started in 2004. Cambridge Falls started with infrastructure additions (lights, gas, water, sewer lines, streets) in 2005.

The newly built Fort Bend Tollway has given eastern Fort Bend County residents another option of travel into the city of Houston, as the Tollway is 6.2 miles (10.0 km) long from Highway 6 to U.S. Highway 90 in southwest Houston, and eventually will travel all the way to Loop 610. The average commute time for those living in eastern Fort Bend County using the full route from Highway 6 to Loop 610 (when it opens) should average 20 minutes. A typical trip down FM 521, which turns into Almeda in Houston, or State Highway 288 north into the Texas Medical Center, takes at least 30–45 minutes in rush hour traffic.

A Houston Chronicle article from February 25, 2007, titled "Straddling urban, rural in Fresno" highlights the unregulated nature of Fresno.

== Demographics ==
Historical population
| Census | Pop. | Note | %± |
|---|---|---|---|
| 1990 | 3,182 | | — |
| 2000 | 6,603 | | 107.5% |
| 2010 | 19,069 | | 188.8% |
| 2020 | 24,486 | | 28.4% |
U.S. Decennial Census; 1850–1900 1910; 1920 1930 1940; 1950 1960 1970; 1980 1990 2000; 2010

Fresno first appeared as a census designated place in the 1990 U.S. census.

=== Racial and ethnic composition ===
Fresno CDP, Texas – Racial and ethnic composition Note: the US census treats Hispanic/Latino as an ethnic category. This table excludes Latinos from the racial categories and assigns them to a separate category. Hispanics/Latinos may be of any race.
| Race / Ethnicity (NH = Non-Hispanic) | Pop 2000 | Pop 2010 | Pop 2020 | %2000 | %2010 | %2020 |
|---|---|---|---|---|---|---|
| White (NH) | 1,428 | 1,011 | 898 | 21.63% | 5.30% | 3.67% |
| Black or African American (NH) | 1,739 | 11,225 | 13,690 | 26.34% | 58.87% | 55.91% |
| Native American or Alaska Native (NH) | 7 | 15 | 30 | 0.11% | 0.08% | 0.12% |
| Asian (NH) | 65 | 181 | 289 | 0.98% | 0.95% | 1.18% |
| Native Hawaiian or Pacific Islander alone (NH) | 0 | 2 | 11 | 0.00% | 0.01% | 0.04% |
| Other race alone (NH) | 8 | 43 | 87 | 0.12% | 0.23% | 0.36% |
| Mixed race or Multiracial (NH) | 62 | 274 | 524 | 0.94% | 1.44% | 2.14% |
| Hispanic or Latino | 3,294 | 6,318 | 8,957 | 49.89% | 33.13% | 36.58% |
| Total | 6,603 | 19,069 | 24,486 | 100.00% | 100.00% | 100.00% |

=== 2020 census ===
As of the 2020 census, Fresno had a population of 24,486. The median age was 32.2 years. 30.0% of residents were under the age of 18 and 7.4% of residents were 65 years of age or older. For every 100 females there were 90.7 males, and for every 100 females age 18 and over there were 85.2 males age 18 and over.

99.4% of residents lived in urban areas, while 0.6% lived in rural areas.

The 2020 census counted 7,247 households, including 5,789 family households; 50.2% had children under the age of 18 living in them. Of all households, 51.2% were married-couple households, 12.3% were households with a male householder and no spouse or partner present, and 30.6% were households with a female householder and no spouse or partner present. About 14.5% of all households were made up of individuals and 3.5% had someone living alone who was 65 years of age or older.

There were 7,515 housing units, of which 3.6% were vacant. The homeowner vacancy rate was 1.0% and the rental vacancy rate was 6.9%.

Racial composition as of the 2020 census
| Race | Number | Percent |
|---|---|---|
| White | 2,347 | 9.6% |
| Black or African American | 13,913 | 56.8% |
| American Indian and Alaska Native | 265 | 1.1% |
| Asian | 309 | 1.3% |
| Native Hawaiian and Other Pacific Islander | 22 | 0.1% |
| Some other race | 4,577 | 18.7% |
| Two or more races | 3,053 | 12.5% |
| Hispanic or Latino (of any race) | 8,957 | 36.6% |

=== 2000 census ===
As of the census of 2000, there were 6,603 people, 1,881 households, and 1,600 families residing in the CDP. The population density was 734.8 inhabitants per square mile (283.7/km^{2}). There were 2,002 housing units at an average density of 222.8 per square mile (86.0/km^{2}). The racial makeup of the CDP was 44.36% White, 26.55% African American, 0.41% Native American, 1.08% Asian, 0.03% Pacific Islander, 25.23% from other races, and 2.35% from two or more races. Hispanic or Latino of any race were 49.89% of the population.

There were 1,881 households, out of which 54.1% had children under the age of 18 living with them, 68.6% were married couples living together, 12.0% had a female householder with no husband present, and 14.9% were non-families. 12.4% of all households were made up of individuals, and 2.8% had someone living alone who was 65 years of age or older. The average household size was 3.51 and the average family size was 3.83.

In the CDP, the population was spread out, with 36.1% under the age of 18, 9.0% from 18 to 24, 34.6% from 25 to 44, 16.0% from 45 to 64, and 4.4% who were 65 years of age or older. The median age was 28 years. For every 100 females, there were 102.2 males. For every 100 females age 18 and over, there were 99.7 males.

The median income for a household in the CDP was $46,290, and the median income for a family was $48,824. Males had a median income of $32,606 versus $30,527 for females. The per capita income for the CDP was $14,340. About 10.9% of families and 15.3% of the population were below the poverty line, including 20.6% of those under age 18 and 17.0% of those age 65 or over.

=== Public safety ===
The Fresno area is patrolled by the Fort Bend County Sheriff's Office. The Teal Bend subdivision is also patrolled by contract deputies of the Precinct 1 Constable's Office. The Fresno Volunteer Fire Department provides fire protection. Fort Bend EMS provides emergency medical services to the area.

== Government and infrastructure ==
The United States Postal Service operates the Fresno Post Office at 2723 Farm to Market Road 521.

Fort Bend County does not have a hospital district. OakBend Medical Center serves as the county's charity hospital which the county contracts with.

== Education ==
School age children in Fresno attend schools in the Fort Bend Independent School District.

The community is within the East Division, controlling school board slots 5 through 7.

School zones are as follows: Two elementary schools, Lula Belle Goodman Elementary School and Burton Elementary School are located in Fresno's Teal Run neighborhood. A third elementary school, Rosa Parks Elementary School, is in Fresno. A small portion is zoned to Heritage Road Elementary School, outside of Fresno. Some middle school students (grades 6–8) attend Lake Olympia Middle School in Missouri City, while other Fresno students attend Billy Baines Middle School. Most of Fresno is zoned to Hightower High School in Missouri City, while some of it is zoned to Willowridge High School in Houston.

Prior to the opening of Hightower, Elkins High School served Fresno. For a period, the majority of Fresno was in the Hightower zone. Prior to 2023, portions of Fresno were zoned to Ridge Point High School in Sienna (formerly Sienna Plantation).

The Texas Legislature specifies that the Houston Community College (HCC) boundary includes "the part of the Fort Bend Independent School District that is not located in the service area of the Wharton County Junior College District and that is adjacent to the Houston Community College System District." Wharton College's boundary within FBISD is defined only as the City of Sugar Land and the ETJ of Sugar Land, and Fresno is not in the Sugar Land ETJ. Fresno is in HCC.

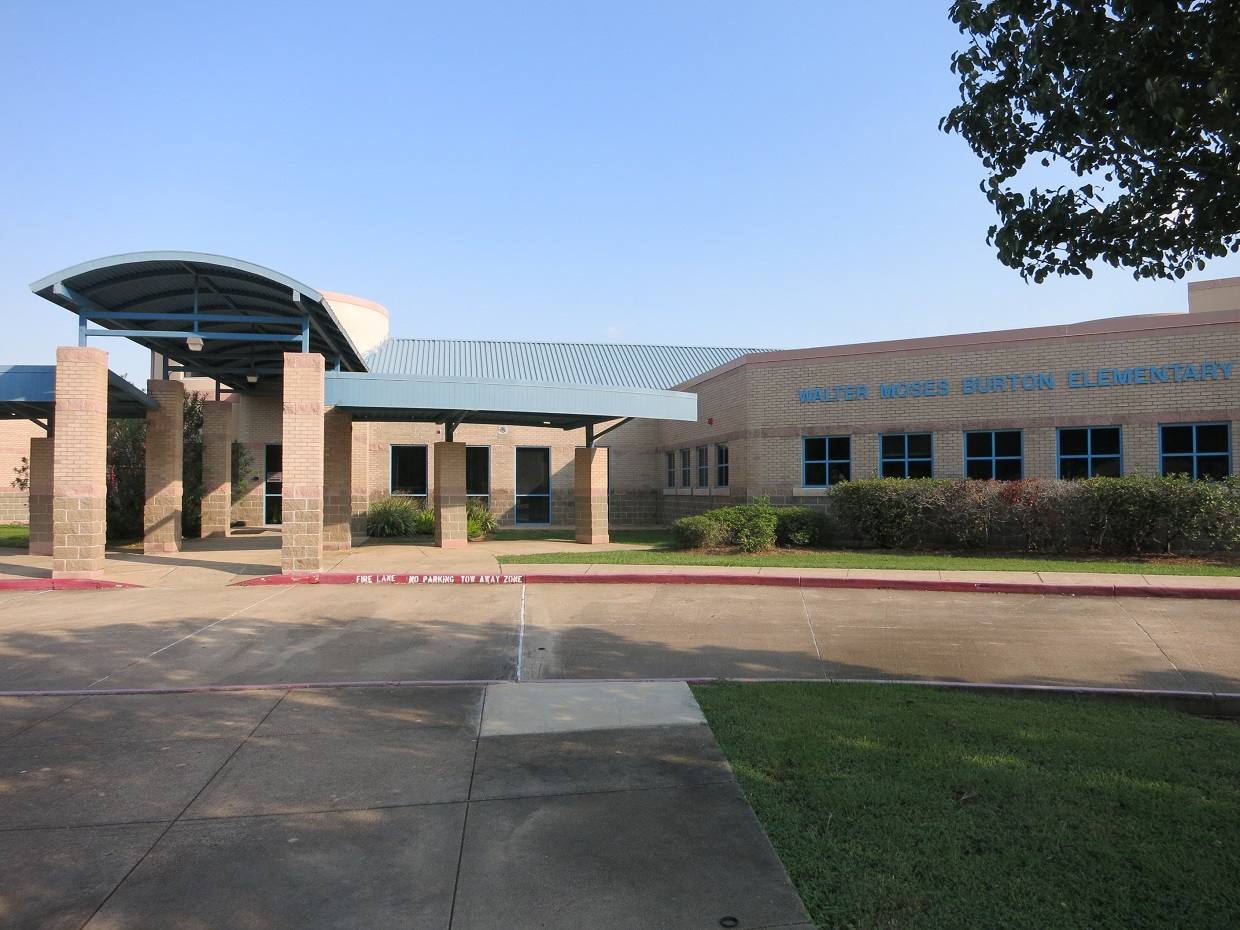
Walter Moses Burton Elementary School

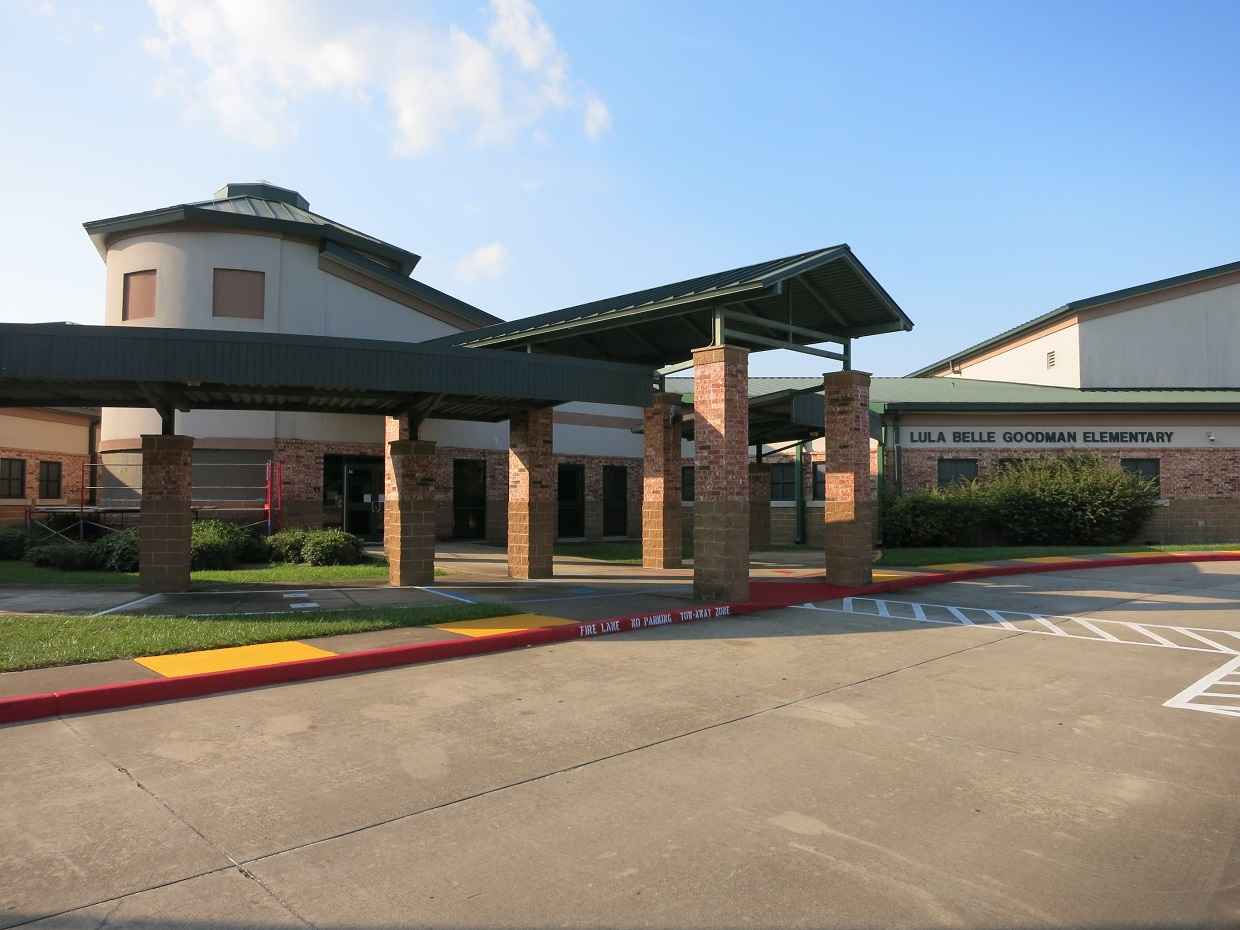
Lula Belle Goodman Elementary School

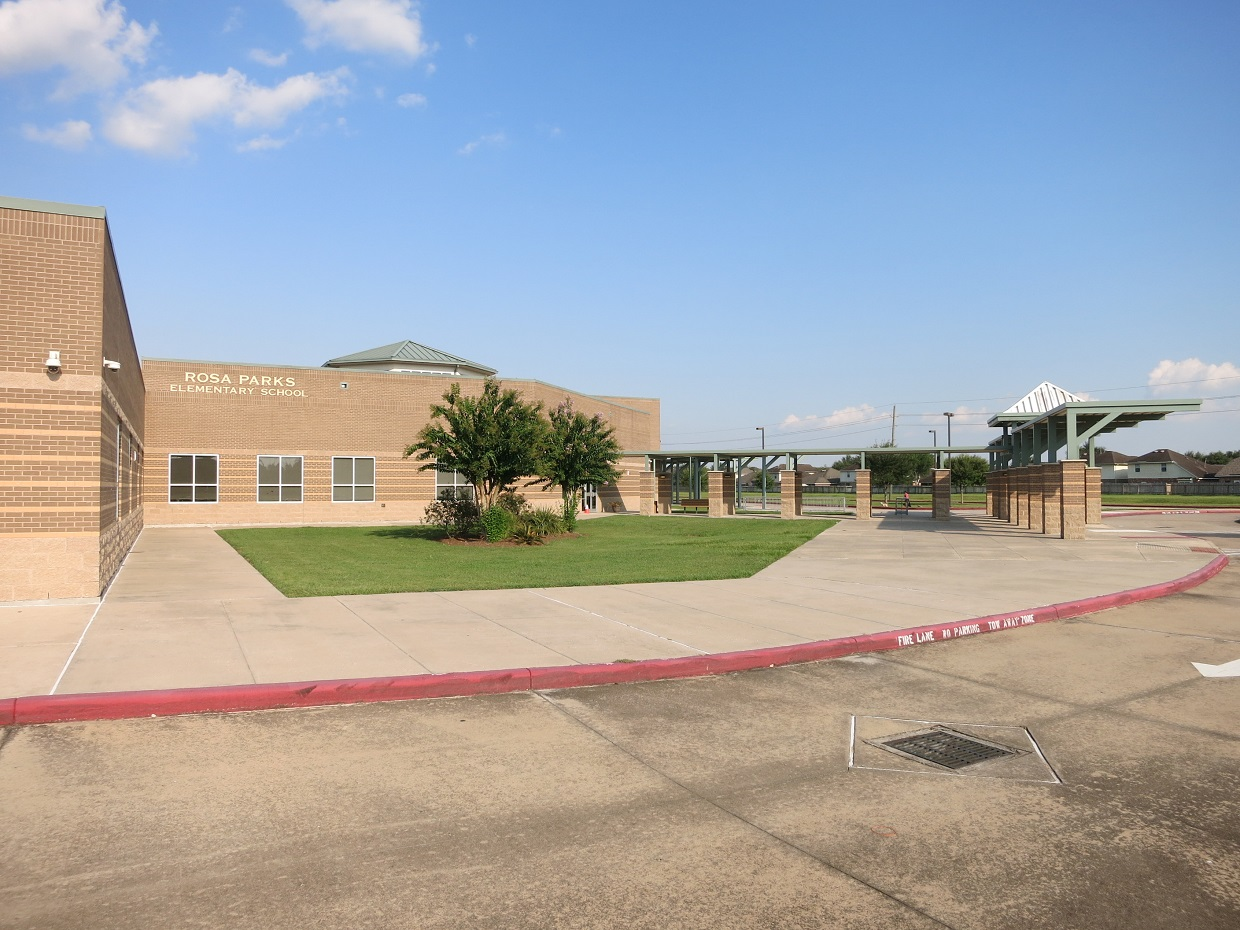
Rosa Parks Elementary School

== Parks and recreation ==
Fort Bend County operates the Mustang Community Center in Fresno. The 5-acre (20,000 m^{2}) community center includes one baseball field, benches, one meeting room, two pavilions, one play area, tables, and one walking trail.
