= Juliff, Texas =

- Unincorporated community
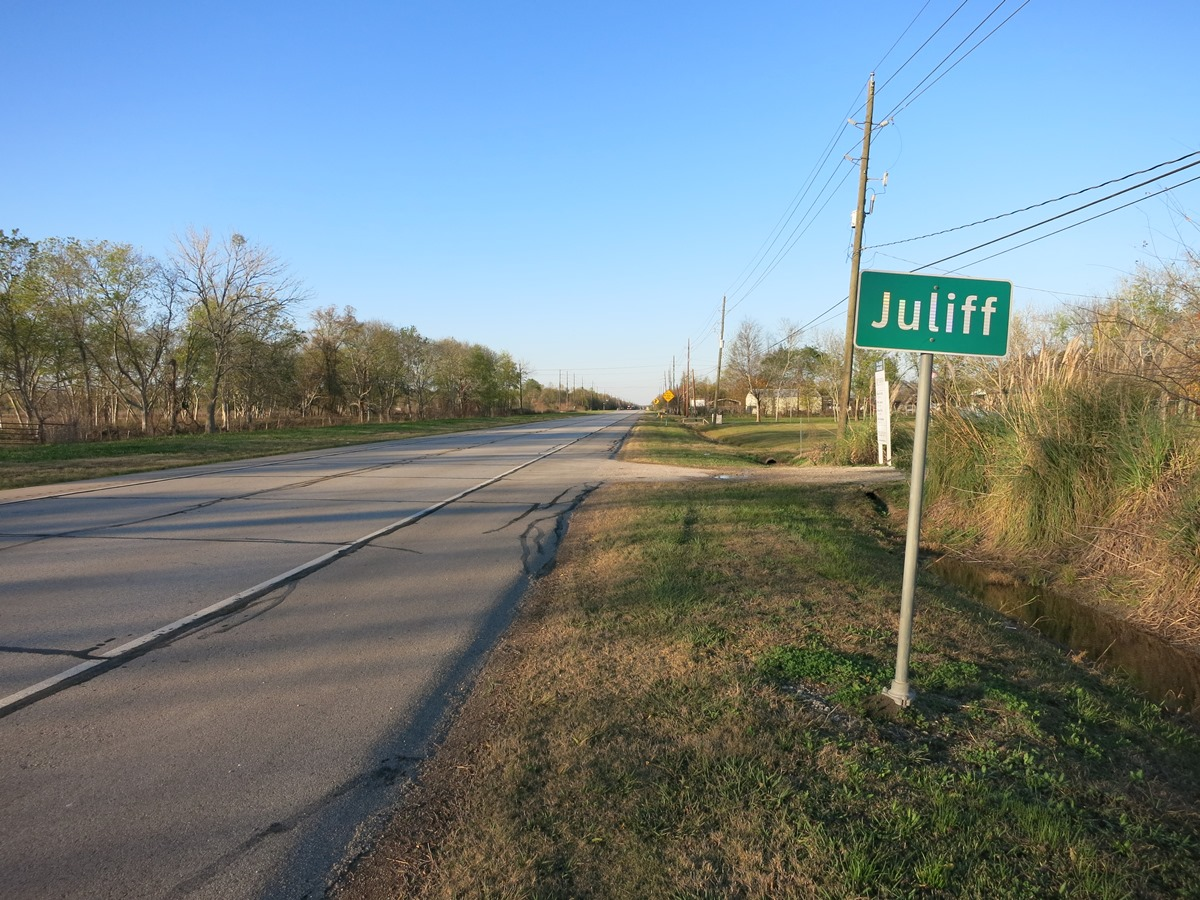
- Juliff sign on FM 521 looking north

- Location within Texas Location within the United States
- Coordinates: 29°27′01″N 95°28′32″W
- Country: United States
- State: Texas
- County: Fort Bend
- Elevation: 59 ft (18 m)
- Time zone: UTC-6 (Central (CST))
  - Summer (DST): UTC-5 (CDT)
- ZIP code: 77583
- Area code: 979
- GNIS feature ID: 1378507

Juliff is an unincorporated community in Fort Bend County, Texas, United States. It is a part of the Greater Houston metropolitan area.

== History ==
During the Antebellum (pre-Civil War) period, the area was within the Arcola Plantation. The community received its name from John J. Juliff, a settler. In the 1850s, the community served as a Brazos River shipping point. In 1858, the Houston Tap and Brazoria Railway opened in the community. In 1891, the community received a post office. In 1896, a general store appeared. The post office closed in 1908 and reopened in 1914. In 1933, a man named Thurman "Doc" Duke purchased several acres of land by the railroad line, opened a store, and leased the remaining land to other tenants. The tenants opened a dance hall and a group of taverns. This led to Juliff gaining a concentration of consumption of alcohol, gambling, and prostitution. The population of Juliff began to know the town by the name "Diddy Wa Diddy," after a song made up by a local in 1934. It soon became an unofficial name for the community and appeared in several Blues songs in the 1930s and 1950s. By 1940, Juliff had approximately 50 residents, a church, and three businesses. During the 1940s, the population increased to 150. The post office closed in 1958. By the 1960s, the bars closed or relocated to Houston. By the 1980s, the community consisted of several scattered houses.

The song lyrics "Diddy Wa Diddy - "ain't no town - ain't no city" don't specifically mention Juliff, but according to folklore, Diddy Wa Diddy alludes to a legendary location where food is plentiful and labor is nonexistent, much like The Big Rock Candy Mountains was for hobos. According to other accounts, the song was written by Blind Blake, a guitarist from Jacksonville, Florida, who recorded the song at least twice before going missing in the early 1930s. It is presumed that the unidentified musician in Juliff was merely one in a long line of people who utilized the lyric, since Blind Blake's recordings survive. The vocalist of the song states in one rendition "I just found out what Diddy Wa Diddy means," but in another, she begs for someone to explain what Diddy Wa Diddy means. Additionally, Texas author and journalist Billy Porterfield (who was no stranger to locations such as old Juliff) utilized the words as a title (Diddy Waw Diddy).

The community shipped cotton along the river. The saloons in the area were also said to have moved to a place called "Mud Alley" in Richmond. The community also has much ragweed in the area.

== Geography ==
Juliff is located along Farm to Market Road 521 and the Missouri Pacific Railroad on the Brazos River, 20 mi (32 km) east of Richmond, 4 mi (6.4 km) south of Arcola, and 8 mi (13 km) north of Rosharon in eastern Fort Bend County.

== Education ==
Juliff is zoned to schools in the Fort Bend Independent School District (FBISD).

The community is within the East Division, controlling school board slots 5 through 7.

Zoned schools include:

- Heritage Rose Elementary School
- Thornton Middle School
- Almeta Crawford High School

Before the opening of Hightower High School, Elkins High School served Juliff. For a period, Juliff was zoned to Hightower. The community was also, for a period, served by Ridge Point High School. For a period it was zoned to Schiff Elementary School, and Billy Baines Middle School.

The Texas Legislature specifies that the Houston Community College (HCC) boundary includes "the part of the Fort Bend Independent School District that is not located in the service area of the Wharton County Junior College District and that is adjacent to the Houston Community College System District." Wharton College's boundary within FBISD is defined only as the City of Sugar Land and the ETJ of Sugar Land, Juliff is in neither location. Juliff is in HCC.
