= Sienna, Texas =

Census-designated master-planned community in Fort Bend County, Texas

Sienna, Texas Sienna
- Census-designated place
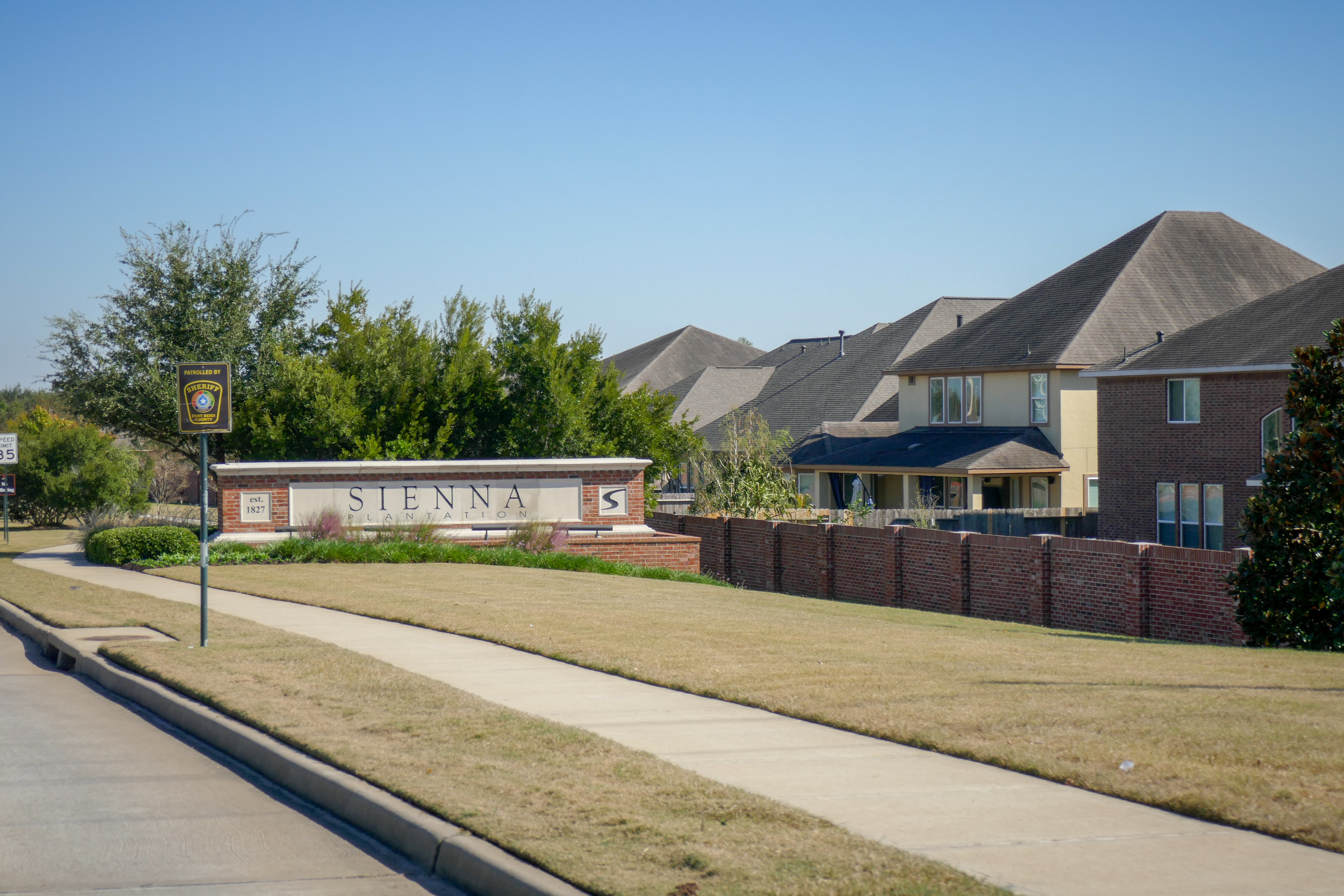
- Sienna Entrance

- Coordinates: 29°29′35″N 95°30′24″W
- Country: United States
- State: Texas
- County: Fort Bend

Area
  - Total: 14.1 sq mi (36.4 km^{2})
  - Land: 13.6 sq mi (35.3 km^{2})
  - Water: 0.42 sq mi (1.1 km^{2})
- Elevation: 59 ft (18 m)

Population (2020)
  - Total: 20,204
  - Density: 1,008/sq mi (389.2/km^{2})
- Time zone: UTC-6 (Central (CST))
  - Summer (DST): UTC-5 (CDT)
- ZIP code: 77459
- FIPS code: 48-67766
- GNIS feature ID: 1852766

Sienna, formerly known as Sienna Plantation, is a census-designated place and master-planned community located in Fort Bend County, Texas, United States. It is mostly in the extraterritorial jurisdiction (ETJ) of Missouri City with the remainder in the ETJ of Arcola. The population was 20,204 at the 2020 census, up from 13,721 at the 2010 census.

== History ==
The Sienna subdivision is on land that previously operated as a sugar and cotton plantation, which relied on enslaved labor during the 19th century. The land was purchased in 1840 by Jonathan D. Waters, a South Carolina planter, who developed it into a working plantation along the Brazos River. Like many plantations in Texas at the time, it depended on enslaved people for agricultural production until the abolition of slavery in 1865.

In 1872, Houston businessman Thomas W. House acquired the property, followed by former Houston mayor Thomas H. Scanlan in 1913. The Scanlan family later entrusted the land to the Scanlan Foundation, which benefited the Roman Catholic Archdiocese of Galveston–Houston. From the 1950s until 1972, the Cenacle Sisters operated the Cenacle Retreat on the property as a religious retreat center.

In the 1970s, developer Larry Johnson founded the Johnson Development Corporation and began planning the transformation of the area into a master-planned community. In 1978, the initial development phase started, including single-family homes, roads, and a 10-mile-long levee for flood protection. However, the project stalled during the economic downturn of the 1980s.

The developer refocused efforts in 1994, with significant investments from Tan Yu, a billionaire developer from the Philippines, who was based in Taiwan at the time. By 2009, 5,000 of the 5,200 planned homes were occupied.

In May 2019, after requests from residents, community groups, and discussions about its historical connotations, the community officially changed its name from "Sienna Plantation" to "Sienna" to distance itself from its past as a site of enslaved labor.

== Geography ==
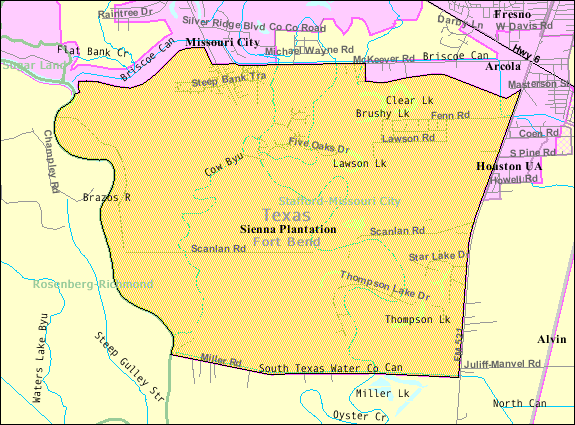
Map of Sienna Plantation CDP

Sienna is located in eastern Fort Bend County at 29°29′35″N 95°30′24″W (29.493136, -95.506707). It is bordered to the north and west by Missouri City and to the northeast by Arcola. The Brazos River runs just west of the western border of Sienna, and Oyster Creek flows southwards through the center of the CDP. Downtown Houston is 27 miles (43 km) to the north. The first homes were sold in 1996.

According to the United States Census Bureau, the CDP has a total area of 14.1 square miles (36.4 km^{2}), of which 13.6 square miles (35.3 km^{2}) is land and 0.42 square miles (1.1 km^{2}), or 3.05%, is water.

=== Cityscape ===
The development is south of Texas State Highway 6. Sienna Parkway, the main thoroughfare in Sienna, is located off Highway 6. Sienna has many single-family houses of various designs and styles. In 2009 the prices ranged from $160,000s to the millions. A section of Sienna has custom houses that, as of 2009, were priced in the $500,000s. As of that year a 272-unit apartment complex was under construction at the entrance to Sienna. In January 2009 the H-E-B Sienna Market Place, located at the entrance to the Sienna Plantation community, and a Kroger store located 1 mile (1.6 km) east of Sienna opened; before the openings, Sienna had a lack of proximity to grocery stores.

== Demographics ==
Historical population
Census	Pop.	Note	%±
2020	20,204		—
U.S. Decennial Census; 1850–1900 1910; 1920 1930 1940; 1950 1960 1970; 1980 1990 2000; 2010

=== 2020 census ===
Sienna, Texas – Racial and ethnic composition Note: the US Census treats Hispanic/Latino as an ethnic category. This table excludes Latinos from the racial categories and assigns them to a separate category. Hispanics/Latinos may be of any race.
Race / Ethnicity (NH = Non-Hispanic)	Pop 2020	% 2020
White alone (NH)	9,483	46.94%
Black or African American alone (NH)	3,940	19.50%
Native American or Alaska Native alone (NH)	43	0.21%
Asian alone (NH)	2,606	12.90%
Native Hawaiian or Pacific Islander alone (NH)	8	0.04%
Other race alone (NH)	110	0.54%
Mixed race or Multiracial (NH)	935	4.63%
Hispanic or Latino (any race)	3,079	15.24%
Total	20,204	100.00%

As of the 2020 census, Sienna had a population of 20,204 with 5,932 households and 5,494 families; the median age was 36.2 years. 33.0% of residents were under the age of 18 and 8.8% were 65 years of age or older. For every 100 females there were 96.2 males, and for every 100 females age 18 and over there were 91.4 males age 18 and over.

95.7% of residents lived in urban areas, while 4.3% lived in rural areas.

There were 5,932 households in Sienna, of which 58.3% had children under the age of 18 living in them. Of all households, 77.0% were married-couple households, 6.4% were households with a male householder and no spouse or partner present, and 14.3% were households with a female householder and no spouse or partner present. About 8.5% of all households were made up of individuals and 3.2% had someone living alone who was 65 years of age or older.

There were 6,204 housing units, of which 4.4% were vacant. The homeowner vacancy rate was 2.9% and the rental vacancy rate was 4.5%.

Racial composition as of the 2020 census
Race	Number	Percent
White	10,132	50.1%
Black or African American	4,029	19.9%
American Indian and Alaska Native	85	0.4%
Asian	2,631	13.0%
Native Hawaiian and Other Pacific Islander	8	0.0%
Some other race	913	4.5%
Two or more races	2,406	11.9%
Hispanic or Latino (of any race)	3,079	15.2%

=== 2010 census ===
As of the census of 2010, there were 13,721 people and 4,757 households in the CDP. The population density was 1,008.9 inhabitants per square mile (389.5/km^{2}). The racial makeup of the CDP was 57.2% White, 29.8% African American, 4.6% Asian, and 4.0% from two or more races. Hispanic or Latino of any race were 15.7% of the population.

Of the 13,721 people living in the CDP, 32.5% were under 18 years of age, with 4.3% under 5 years of age; 7.2% were age 65 or over.

For the period 2010–14, the estimated median annual income for a household in the CDP was $130,300, and the median income for a family was $130,457. Male full-time workers had a median income of $107,798 versus $74,224 for females. The per capita income for the CDP was $46,039. About 7.0% of families and 6.9% of the population were below the poverty line, including 3.6% of those under age 18 and 15.0% of those age 65 or over.

== Government and infrastructure ==
In 1996, Missouri City and Sienna entered a joint development agreement. This stated that when Sienna was about 90% developed and when the City of Missouri City wished to assume the outstanding development debt of Sienna Plantation, the annexation would take place. There are periodic reviews of the annexation proposals. In 2011, one review concluded that due to the municipal utility debt, if residents of Sienna do not wish to pay extra taxes for fire and police services and other city services, then annexation should come about in 2027.

== Education ==
=== Primary and secondary schools ===
Sienna is served by the Fort Bend Independent School District. The community is within the East Division, controlled school board slots 5 through 7.

The community is zoned to Sienna Crossing Elementary School, Scanlan Oaks Elementary School, Donald Leonetti Elementary School, and Alyssa Ferguson Elementary School, both located within the community. The community is also zoned to Heritage Rose Elementary, Baines Middle School and Ronald Thornton Middle School, both located within Sienna, and First Colony Middle School. Most of Sienna is served by Ridge Point High School, which is located in Sienna on Waters Lake Blvd, and nearby Almeta Crawford High School, which opened in 2023, and Hightower High School.

Donald Leonetti Elementary School opened in 2017 and Ronald Thornton Middle School opened in 2018. Alyssa Ferguson Elementary School opened in 2023.

Also located in Sienna is Divine Savior Academy, a private school that caters to the Christian education of children in grades pre-Kindergarten through high school.

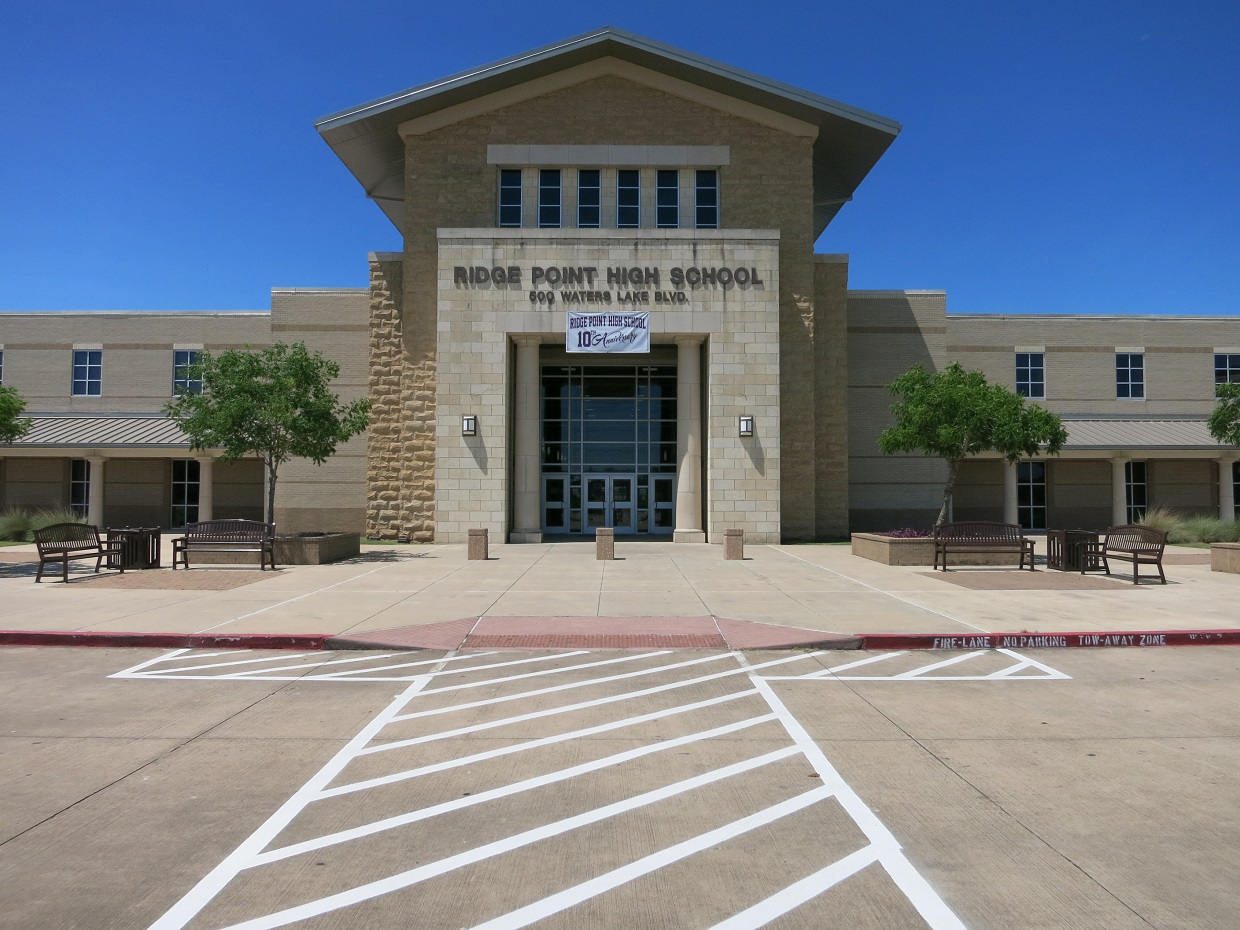
Ridge Point High School

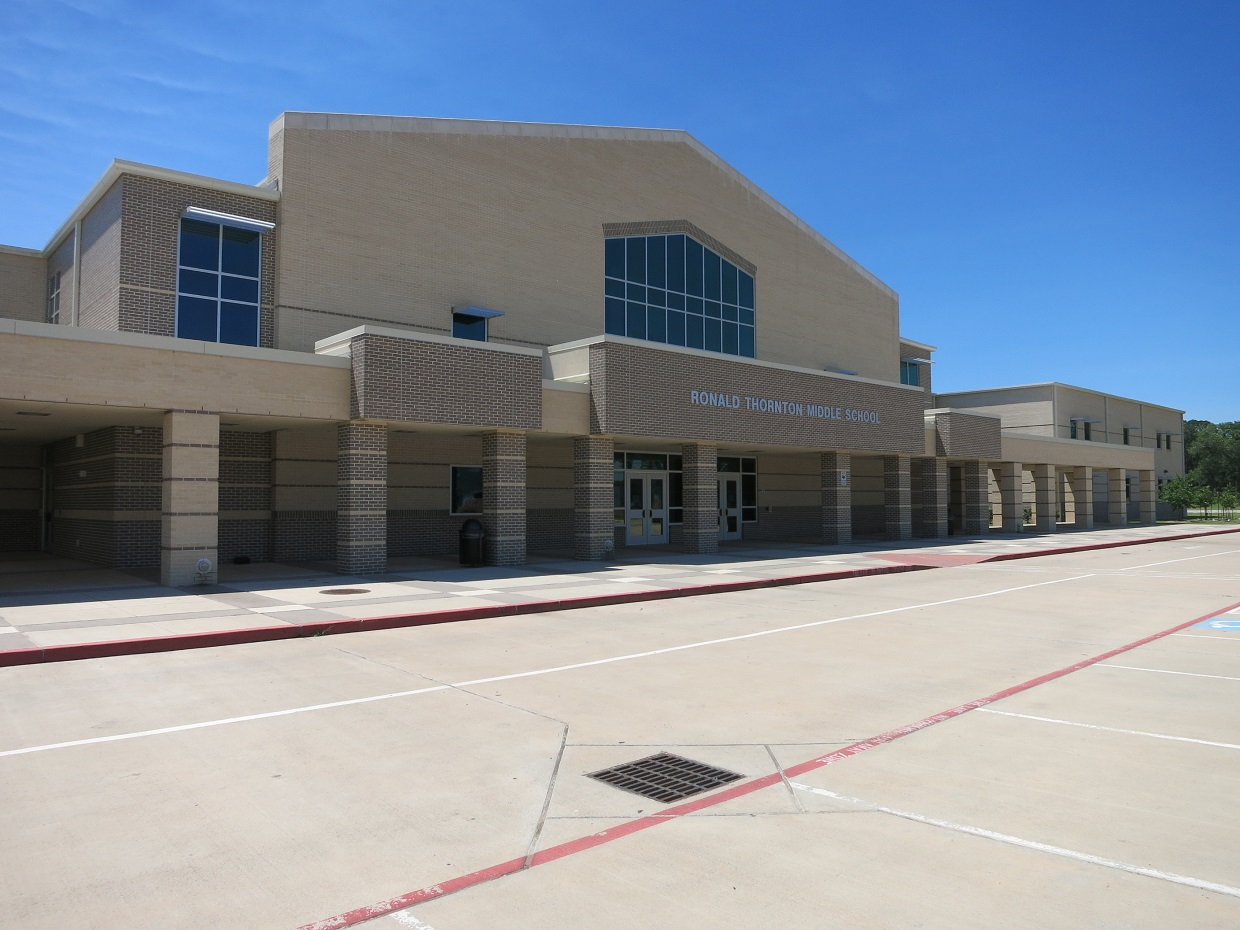
Ronald Thornton Middle School

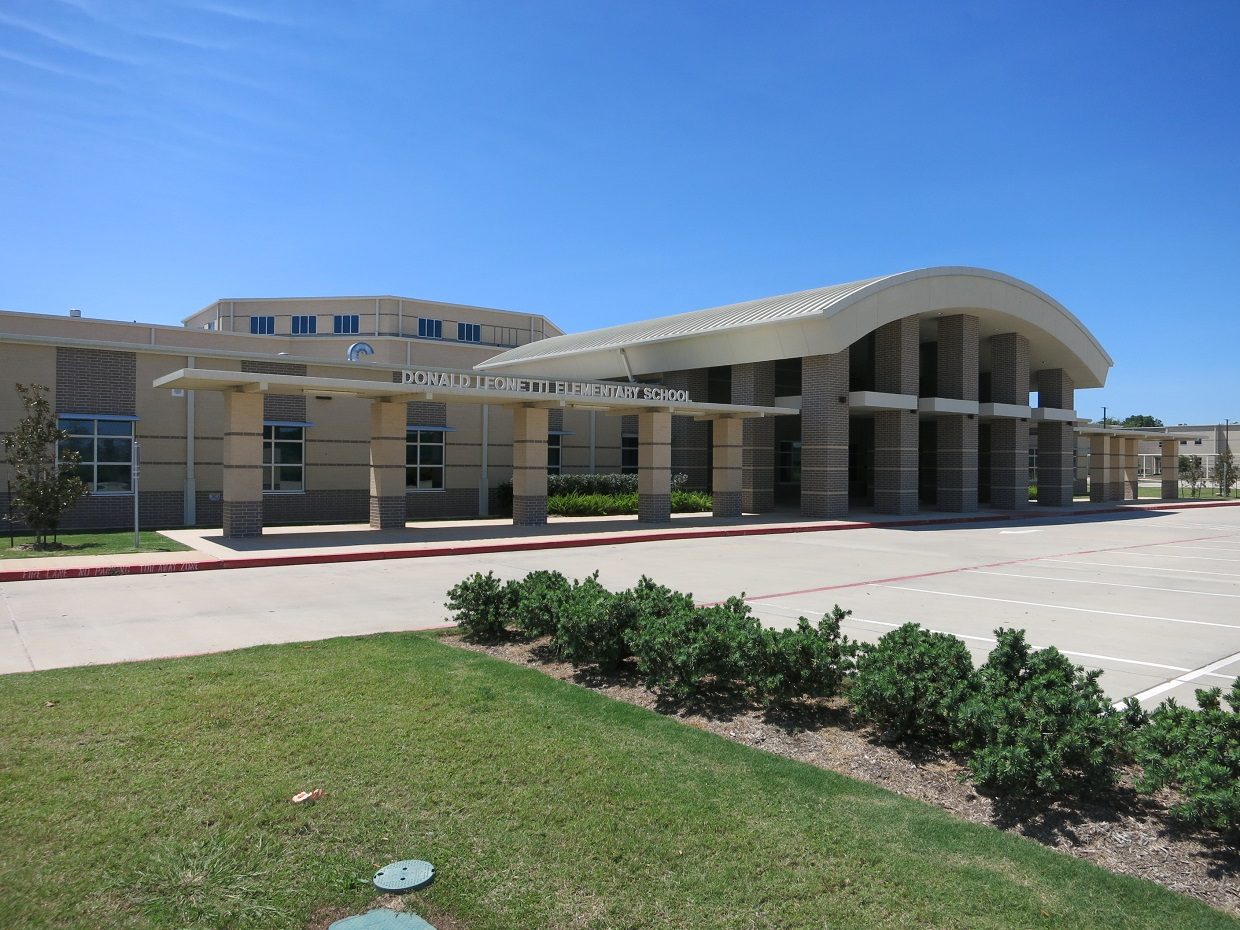
Donald Leonetti Elementary School

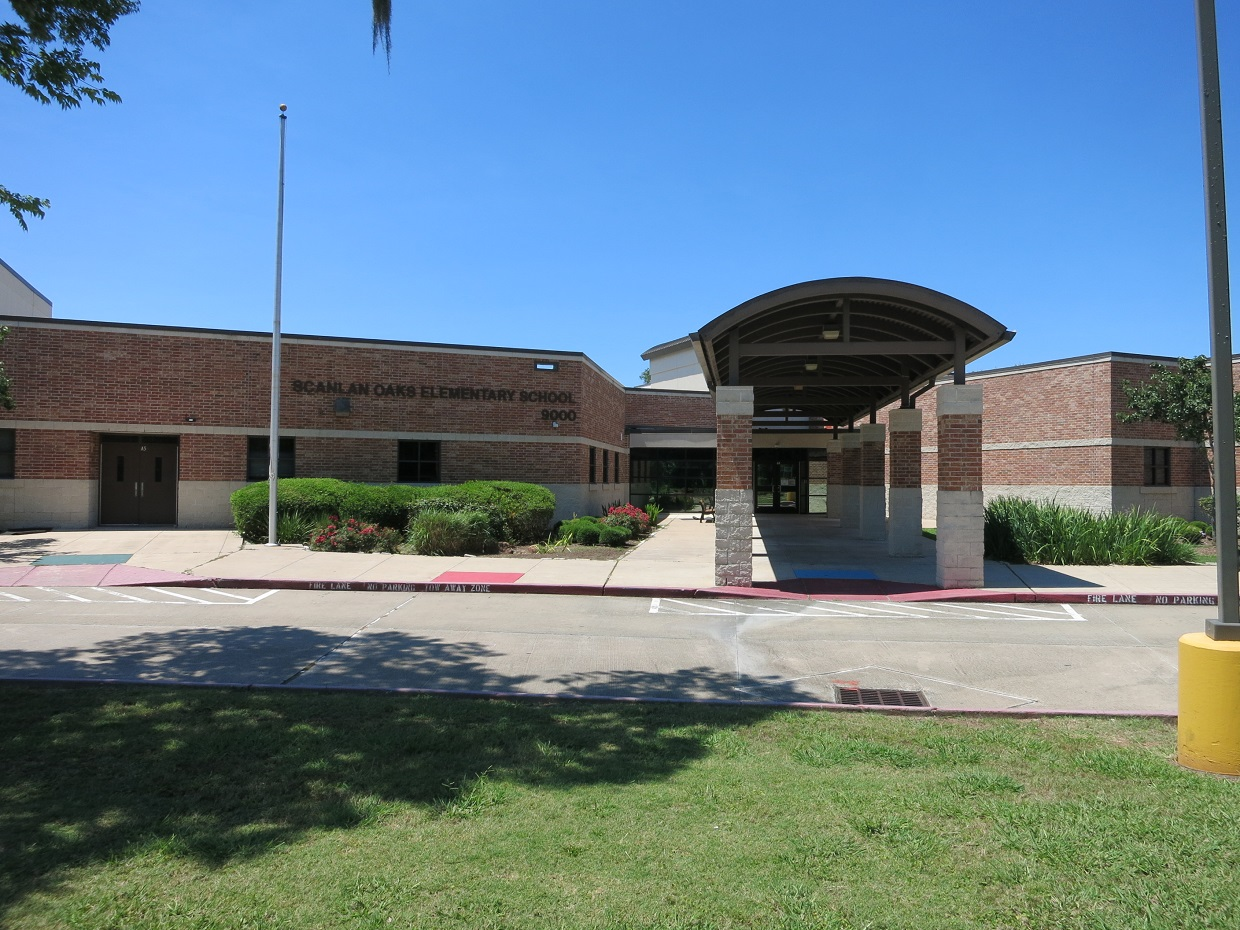
Scanlan Oaks Elementary School

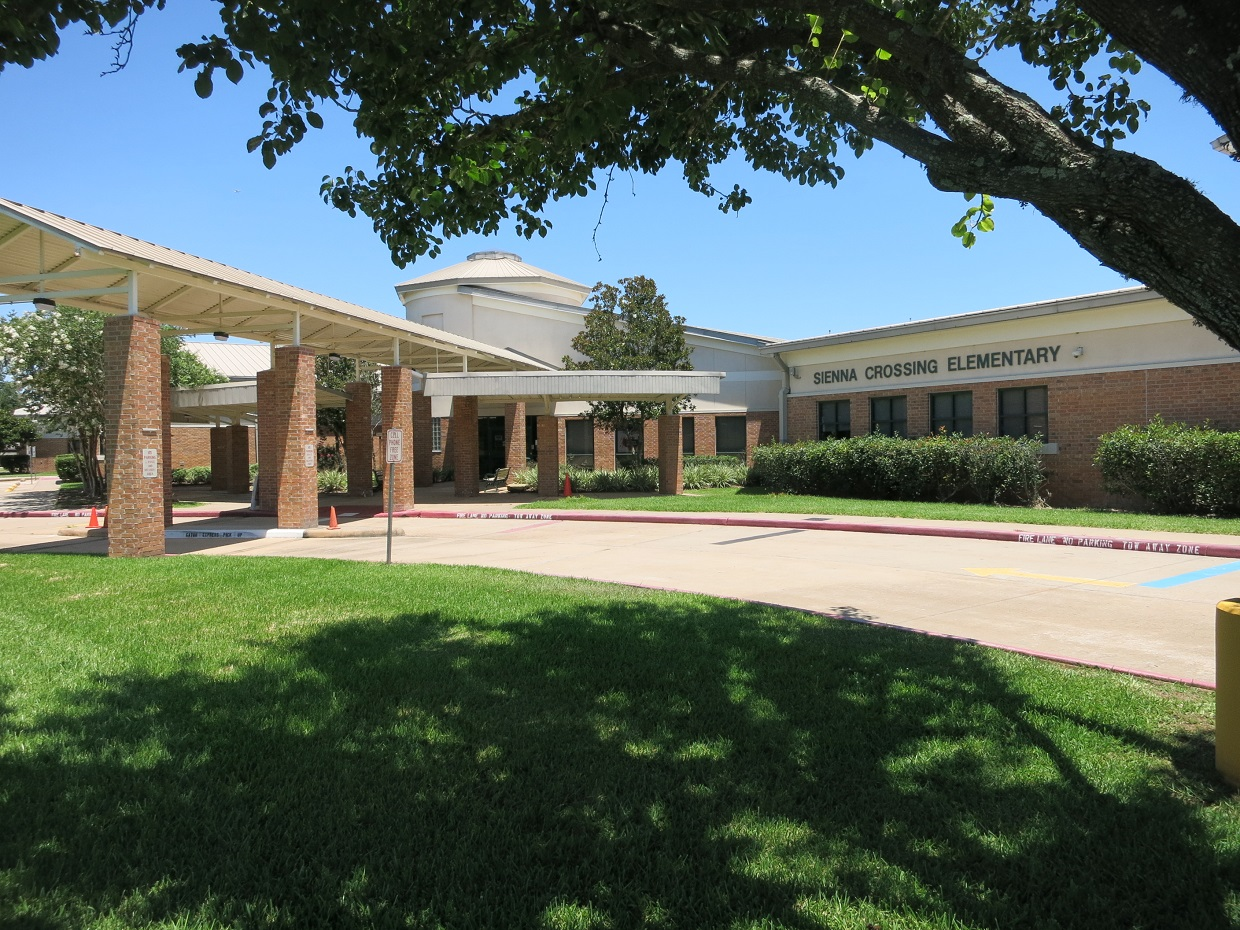
Sienna Crossing Elementary School

==== Histories of schools ====
Before 2010, the portion east of Sienna Parkway was zoned to Hightower High School in Missouri City, while the portion west of Sienna Parkway was zoned to Elkins High School in Missouri City. In 2007 sections of Sienna were rezoned from Hightower to Elkins.

Lake Olympia Middle School in Missouri City served all of Sienna until fall 2006, when Baines Middle School was built.

=== Community colleges ===
The Texas Legislature specifies that the Houston Community College (HCC) boundary includes "the part of the Fort Bend Independent School District that is not located in the service area of the Wharton County Junior College District and that is adjacent to the Houston Community College System District." Wharton College's boundary within FBISD is defined only as the City of Sugar Land and the ETJ of Sugar Land, Sienna is not in the Sugar Land ETJ (it is in the Missouri City and Arcola ETJs). Sienna is in HCC.

HCC had a campus in Sienna from the fall of 2008 until May 2016, when the campus was closed and a new campus was built on Texas Parkway.

=== Public libraries ===
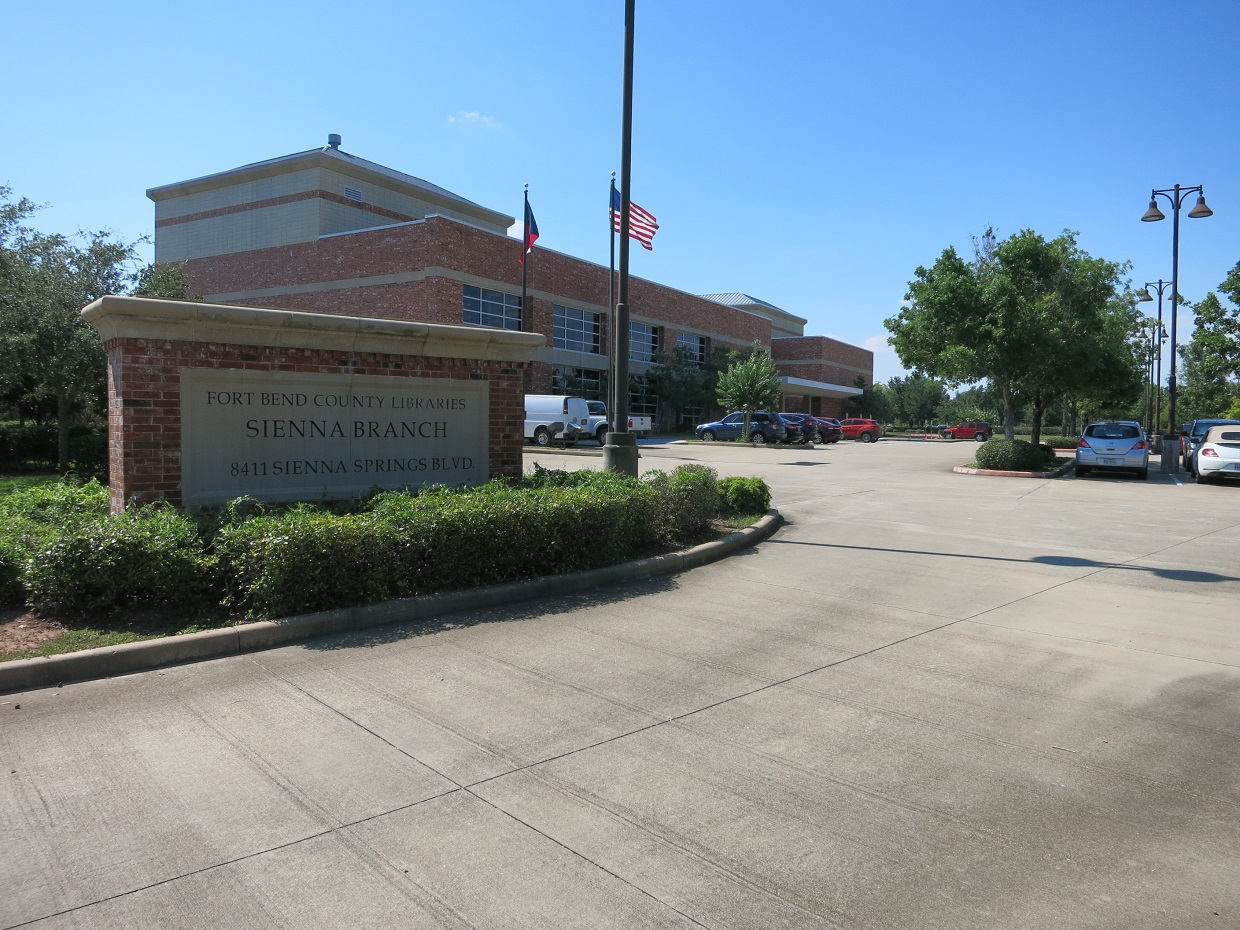
Sienna Branch Library

Fort Bend County Libraries operates the Sienna Branch, which opened on April 24, 2010. The $15 million, two story facility, which has 45,000 square feet (4,200 m^{2}) of space, was a joint project between the library system and Houston Community College. As of May 2016, Houston Community College no longer has a presence in the library building. The Sienna Branch has a 3D printer for the community to use and offers classes on 3D design and printing.

== Parks and recreation ==
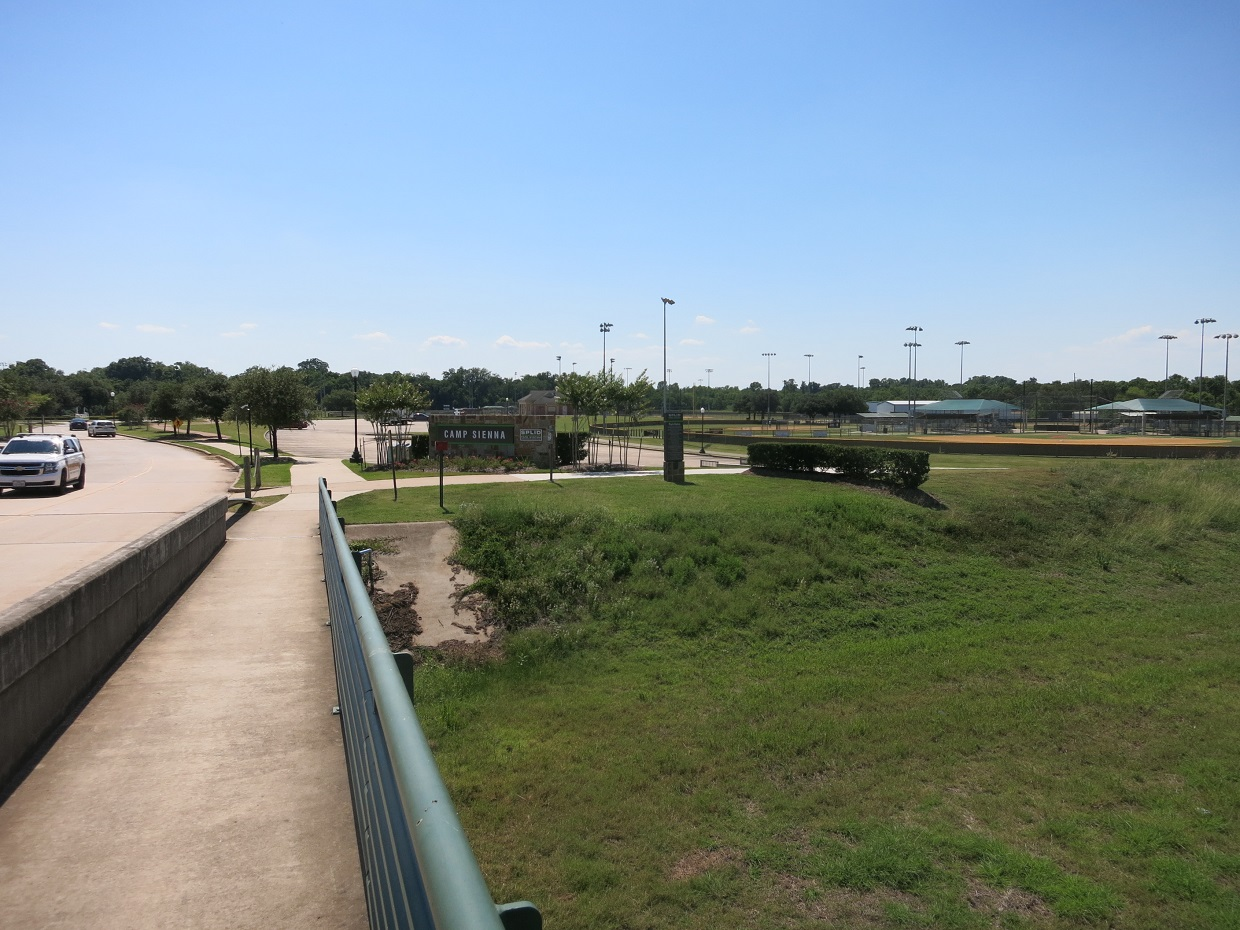
Camp Sienna - showing the baseball fields on the north side.

Zen T. C. Zheng of the Houston Chronicle said that Sienna has "a natural environment." The community has lakes, parks, trees, and a trail along 4 miles (6.4 km) of the frontage of the Brazos River. Sienna has a 160 acres (65 ha) sports complex, an 18-hole championship golf course, recreational centers, an equestrian center, and water parks. The Sienna sports complex is the home to a variety of youth club sports programs, including, the Sienna Panthers Lacrosse Club which has 240 youth lacrosse players ranging from 1st grade to High School. It is also the home field for Team 91 Texas which provides elite Lacrosse for 175 players to compete nationally. The recreational centers include an amphitheater and a fitness room.

In 2019, Sienna announced that they had completed renovations on the tennis center and the Club Sienna recreation complex. Added to the tennis center was outdoor covered seating and a new 1,764-square-foot building that features a tennis pro shop. The refurbished Club Sienna can now accommodate 85 people in its ballroom and offers a conference room for board meetings and a classroom for up to 25 students. Several restrooms were added and the lobby relocated.

Sawmill Lake Club is another option for events and activities for residents. Sawmill Event Pavilion includes an event building as well as recreational space for outdoor fun and relaxation. The resort features a pool, a lakeside patio with a fire pit, and a playground and splash pad for family fun. If cardio, strength training, and exercise classes interest you, the state-of-the-art fitness center is for you.

== Religion ==
As of 2011 many Protestant churches are located in Sienna. On April 30, 2011, an LDS Church meeting house was scheduled to open in the community, serving a 200-member English-speaking ward and a 200-member Spanish-speaking ward. St. Angela Merici Catholic Church was dedicated in 2017 and seats 2000.
