= Ridge Point High School =

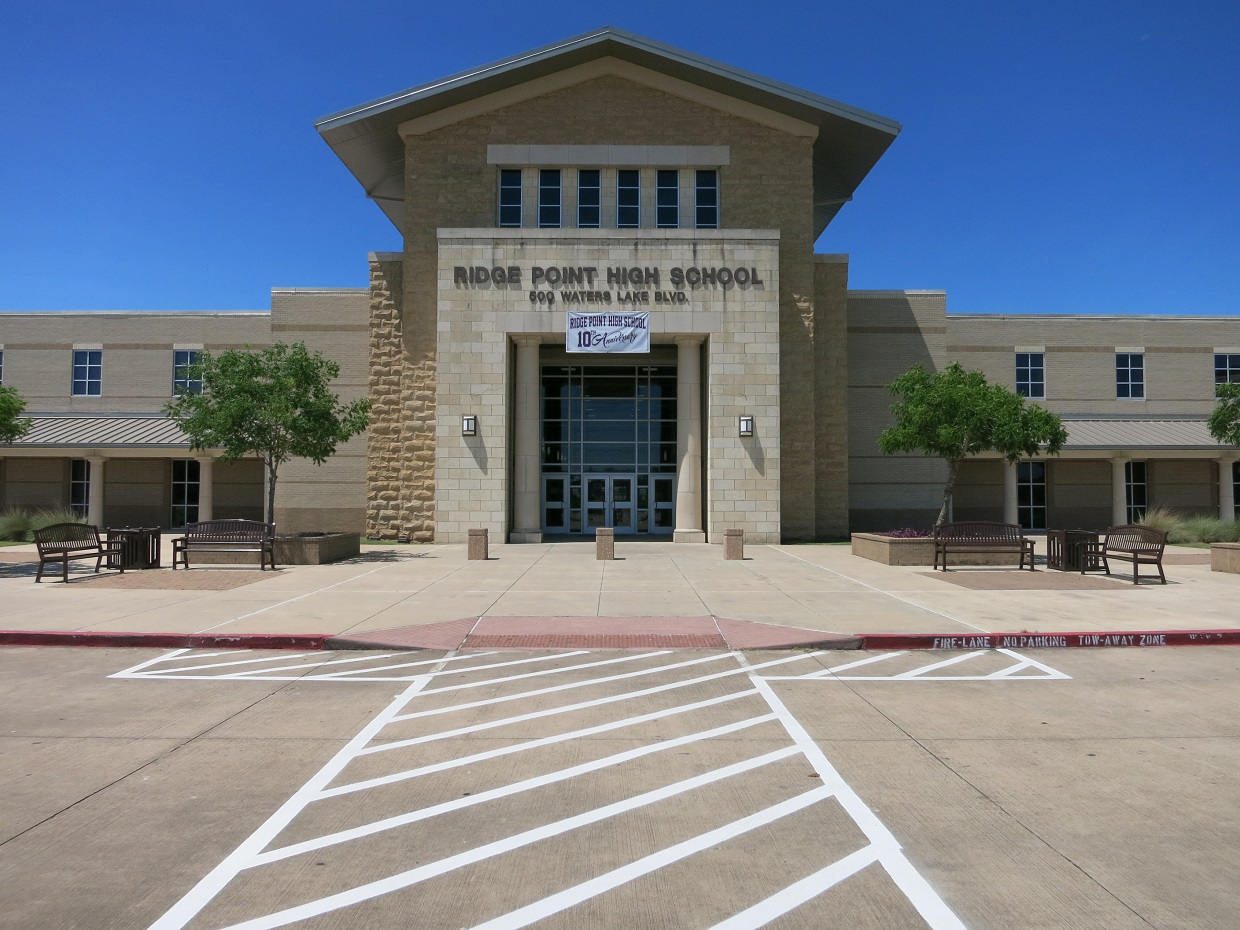
- Ridge Point High School

Location
- 500 Waters Lake Blvd. Missouri City, Texas 77459; United States; 29°29′31″N 95°31′02″W

Information
- Type: Public secondary school
- Motto: There is No Limit to What we can Achieve
- Established: 2010; 16 years ago
- School district: Fort Bend Independent School District
- Principal: Danielle Jackson
- Teaching staff: 145.09 (FTE) (2023–2024)
- Grades: 9-12
- Enrollment: 2,854 (2023–2024)
- Student to teacher ratio: 19.67 (2023–2024)
- Campus size: 77 acres (31 ha)
- Colors: Purple, silver, and white
- Slogan: The Home of Scholars and Champions
- Athletics conference: UIL Class AAAAAA
- Mascot: Panther
- Team name: Panthers
- Yearbook: The Athlon
- Website: rphs.fortbendisd.gov

Ridge Point High School (RPHS) is a public high school located in Sienna (formerly Sienna Plantation), an unincorporated area and planned community in Fort Bend County, Texas.

Opened in 2010, the school serves more than 3000 students in grades 9–12. It is classified as a 6A school by the University Interscholastic League (UIL).

The school's attendance boundary includes: portions of Sienna. It formerly served the following areas: other portions of Sienna, a portion of Fresno, most of Arcola, and Juliff.

== History ==
Ground broke on Fort Bend ISD High School #11 in July 2008, and the campus opened in the 2010–11 school year to ease overcrowding at Hightower and Elkins high schools. Some Sienna Plantation residents criticized the chosen location of Ridge Point, while Arcola residents had a positive reception to the location.

On February 8, 2010, the FBISD board selected "Ridge Point High School" as the school's name. It was chosen to honor area history, specific the Blue Ridge Oil Field and the Buffalo Bayou, Brazos and Colorado Railway reaching Stafford's Point in 1853. Ridge Point High School is one of two high schools within the Fort Bend Independent School District that is not named after a person.

Upon opening the school had 9th and 10th graders, with subsequent grades to be added later. The first graduating class matriculated in 2013.

== Feeder pattern ==
The following elementary schools feed into Ridge Point:

- Ferguson
- Heritage Rose
- Leonetti
- Scanlan Oaks
- Schiff
- Sienna Crossing

The following middle schools feed into Ridge Point:

- Baines
- Thornton

== Athletics ==
Ridge Point athletics are included in UIL District 20-6A division (2016-2024). Other members include FB Austin, FB Bush, FB Clements, FB Dulles, FB Elkins, FB Travis and Richmond George Ranch.

The school's athletic teams played at the junior varsity level upon opening. The varsity American football team began operations in the fall of 2012, while all other sports teams began varsity operations in 2011.

The Ridge Point football team has been district champions from 2014 to 2018 and again from 2020 to 2023 and advanced to the state semifinals in 2016 and state regional finals in 2020. The Ridge Point volleyball team advanced to the state Final Four in both 2019 and 2021.

Boys Athletics:

- Baseball
- Basketball
- Cross Country
- Football
- Golf
- Soccer
- Swimming/Diving
- Tennis
- Track/Field
- Water Polo

Girls Athletics:

- Basketball
- Cheer
- Cross Country
- Golf
- Soccer
- Softball
- Swimming/Diving
- Tennis
- Track/Field
- Volleyball
- Water Polo

== Academics ==
Ridge Point offers more than 20 AP courses and six dual credit classes to allow its students to potentially earn college credit while attending high school.

Additionally, its Academic Decathlon team has produced six individual state champions and placed in the top 25 in Texas in three different years (2016, 2019 and 2021). The school also produced the World Scholar's Cup global round champions in 2019 in competition held in The Hague, Netherlands.

- Academic Decathlon State Finishes (Location) Year
  - 24th (San Antonio) 2016
  - 34th (San Antonio) 2017
  - 23rd (San Antonio) 2019
  - 22nd (San Antonio) 2021
  - 26th (Frisco) 2022
  - 38th (Frisco) 2023
  - 31st (Frisco) 2024

== Controversy ==
=== Sexual misconduct ===
==== 2011 sexual misconduct case ====
On June 14, 2011, Anne Lynn Montgomery, a color-guard instructor at Ridge Point, was charged with sexual assault of a minor under 17 and having an improper relationship with a student at two Houston Independent School District schools. Earlier that year, she filed a restraining order against Bradman Cortez Moore, who she had been living with in Fort Bend County. Moore had been engaged in a sexual relationship with Montgomery, one that began when he was 16 while she was a color guard instructor at Sharpstown High School in Houston. When Montgomery moved to Bellaire High School, Moore also transferred there for mysterious reasons. DNA tests concluded that he was the father of children born in 2008 and 2009. After the relationship came to public light, Montgomery dropped the restraining order. Although she was working at Ridge Point, she left in April after an investigation was launched.

==== 2016 sexual misconduct case ====
In March 2016, rumors circulated on campus detailing that teachers were having sex with students and sending nude pictures to them. Two teachers were put on administrative leave afterwards. A month later on April 28, 27-year-old Lillian Cameron, a chemistry teacher, turned herself in to the police after resigning.

== Notable alumni ==
- Ashton Bethel-Roman (2024) - college football wide receiver
- Bryce Deadmon (2015) - track and field Olympian
- Adonai Mitchell - NFL wide receiver
- Michael Turk (2017) - punter
- Will Vest - MLB pitcher
