= Hightower High School =

Public school in Texas, United States

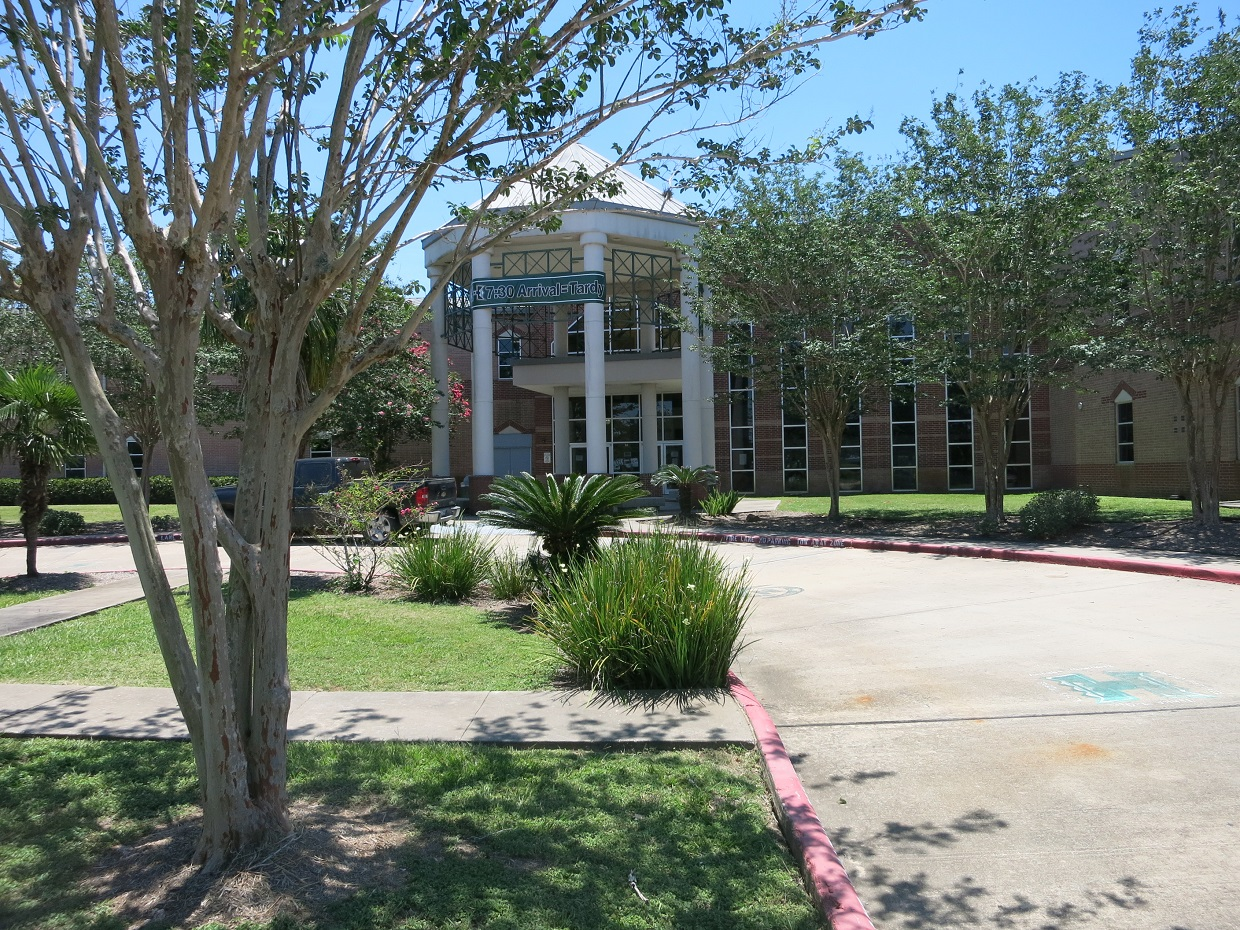

Location
- 3333 Hurricane Lane; Missouri City, Texas 77459; United States; 29.5314°N 95.4976°W

Information
- Type: Public
- Established: 1998
- School district: Fort Bend Independent School District
- NCES District ID: 4819650
- Educational authority: Texas Education Agency
- Superintendent: Marc Smith
- CEEB code: 446788
- NCES School ID: 481965007885
- Principal: Andre Roberson
- Faculty: 248
- Teaching staff: 143.53 (on an FTE basis)
- Grades: 9-12
- Enrollment: 2,312 (2024-2025)
  - Grade 9: 617
  - Grade 10: 564
  - Grade 11: 559
  - Grade 12: 572
- Student to teacher ratio: 16.11
- Schedule type: modified block schedule
- Schedule: 8 periods
- Campus type: Suburban
- Colors: Hunter Green, Silver, and Black
- Athletics conference: UIL Class 6A
- Mascot: Hurricanes
- Accreditation: Southern Association of Colleges and Schools
- 2022 TEA Rating: C (Student Achievement: 71, School Progress: 69, Closing the Gaps: 68)
- Magnet program(s): Pathways in Technology: Health Science, Medical Sciences Academy, Digital Media Academy
- Website: hhs.fortbendisd.gov

Hightower High School is a secondary school (grades 9–12) located at 3333 Hurricane Lane, Missouri City, Texas, United States, adjacent to The Fort Bend Parkway Toll Road.

Hightower is administered by Fort Bend Independent School District and its mascot is Poseidon, but they are known as the Hightower Hurricanes.

Hightower serves parts of Missouri City, a portion of the city of Arcola, sections of the unincorporated area of Fresno, a small section of western Pearland, and the neighborhood of Lake Shore Harbour, which is located in the extraterritorial jurisdiction of Missouri City. Hightower previously served the rest of Arcola, sections of master-planned community of Sienna Plantation, and the unincorporated area of Juliff.

The school is named after Lockhart Valentine (L.V.) Hightower, a former principal in the district. Hightower had served as an American football coach for Sugar Land High School.

== History ==
Hightower opened on August 13, 1998 and was dedicated on October 11 of the same year. The $35 million school campus, when opened, had fewer than 600 students and 50 teachers. The school only served freshmen and sophomore classes during its first year. Hightower was FBISD's seventh comprehensive high school.

Debbie Dunlap was the first principal. Todd Spivak of the Houston Press said that Dunlap "was hailed for assembling a staff that some say included the best high school teachers in the Houston area" and that the school "quickly gained a reputation for academic excellence and became a destination school for veteran teachers." Dunlap left her position in 2003 so she could work for a teacher certification company.

Patricia Paquin became the next principal. During each year of Paquin's term, until 2006, between 35 and 55 teachers left the school. Todd Spivak of the Houston Press said that many teachers believed that Paquin micromanaged too closely.

In the 2005–2006 school year, Paquin gave over 1,800 suspensions. Spivak said "This would appear to indicate the work of a strict disciplinarian. But many teachers and parents say student behavior at Hightower is getting only worse, with fights breaking out on a regular basis."

Pavlos Karnezis, a 12th grade honors student, was sent to jail and later expelled from school for bringing a knife to class in November 2005. Karnezis was sentenced to a boot camp. Karnezis' parents fought and had the expulsion decision overturned in 2006, allowing Karnezis to return to class.

Viretta West was principal from 2008 to 2016. Frederick Richardson was an interim principal for the Fall semester of 2016, and Thomas Wallis was the interim principal for the Spring semester of 2017. The current principal is Andre Roberson.

By 2006, Hightower had over 2,600 students and 140 teachers.

== Academies ==
In 2006, Hightower High School was one of the district's only two high schools with block scheduling. Todd Spivak of the Houston Press said during that year that the school "is considered the most innovative of the district's seven public high schools". As of the 2015–16 school year, the school went to a normal 7- period schedule. After COVID, in the 2020-2021 and 2021-2022, the school went back to block scheduling. As of the 2022-2023 school year, the school uses a modified block schedule.

Hightower has specialized academies that offer specialized education for gifted and ambitious students.

The Medical Science Academy offers courses such as Medical Terminology, Medical Microbiology, Pharmacology, Pathophysiology, etc. Also, a Medical Science Internship was offered in which students may volunteer in a hospital. Post-COVID, this program has now ended. The current coordinator of the Medical Science Academy is Donald Lam.

The academy has merged with the Telecommunications Media Academy as the Digital Media Academy. The current coordinator of the Digital Media Academy is Laine Skelton.

== Athletics ==
In 2006, Todd Spivak of the Houston Press said that Hightower's athletic facilities were "state-of-the-art" and "rival those of some colleges." Hightower is adjacent to the District owned Hall Stadium and Hopson Field House, resulting in a decrease of transportation for football games.

As of February 1, 2016, Hightower is one of the eight 6A schools in the District. In UIL terms, they are in district 6A-20, alongside Austin, Bush, Clements, Dulles, Kempner, Ridge Point, and Travis High Schools, all of which are in Fort Bend ISD. For a brief moment, they had moved down to 5A but have since returned to district 6A-20.

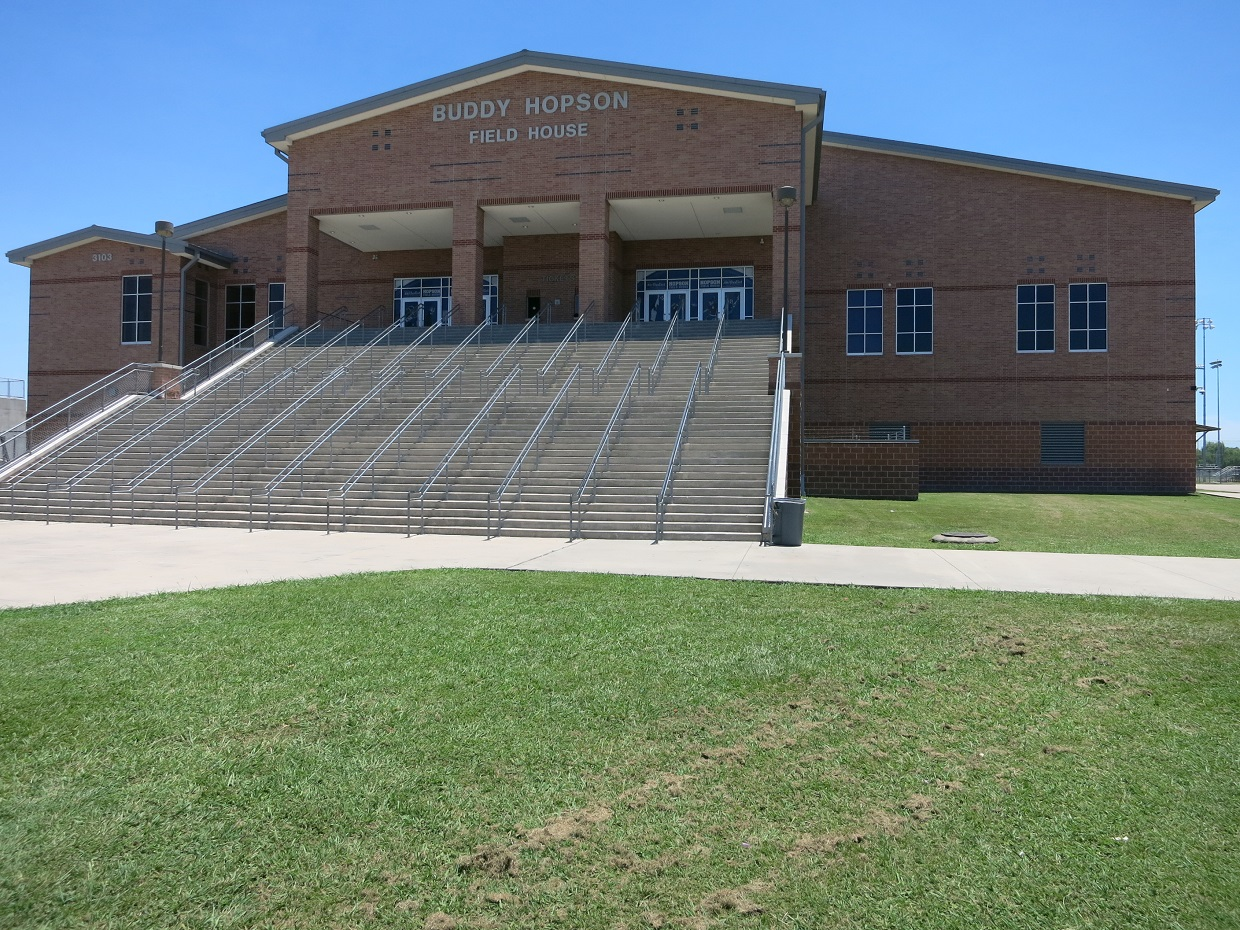
Hopson Field House is on campus.

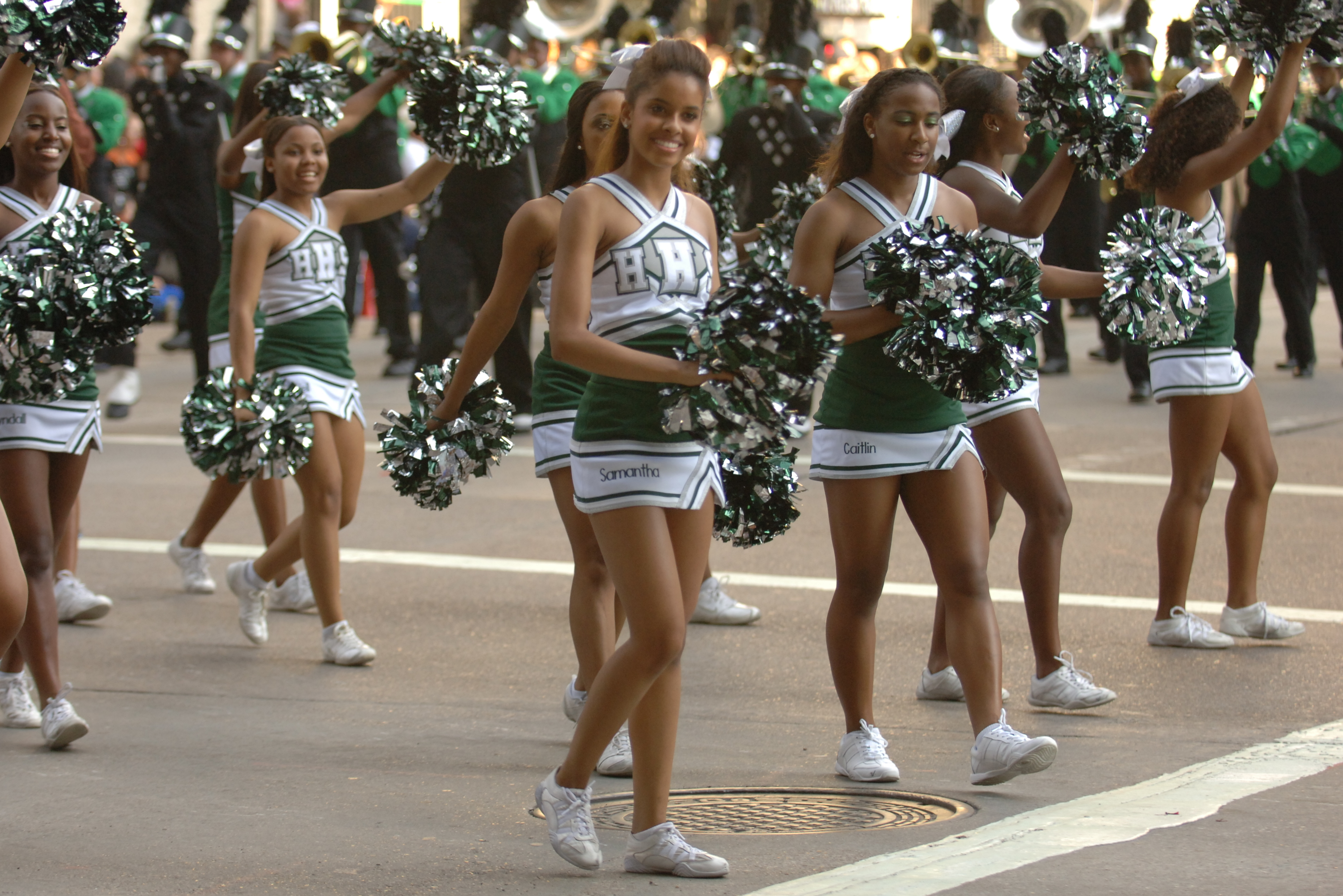
HHS cheerleaders in parade (2012)

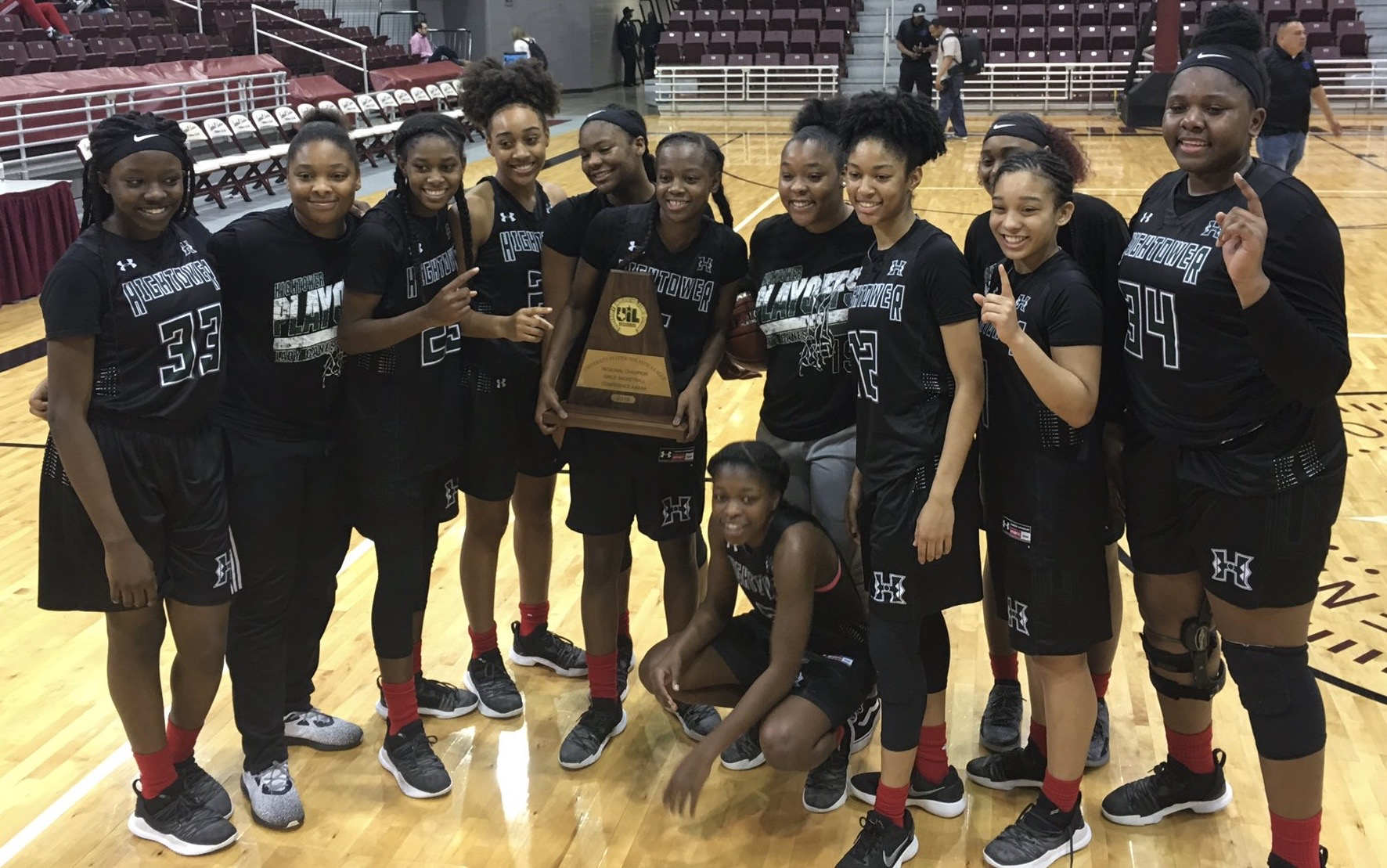
Hightower girls basketball team qualified for 5A UIL state tournament.

== Student bodies ==
In 2016, 72% of the school's student body was African American and Hispanic.

== Associations ==
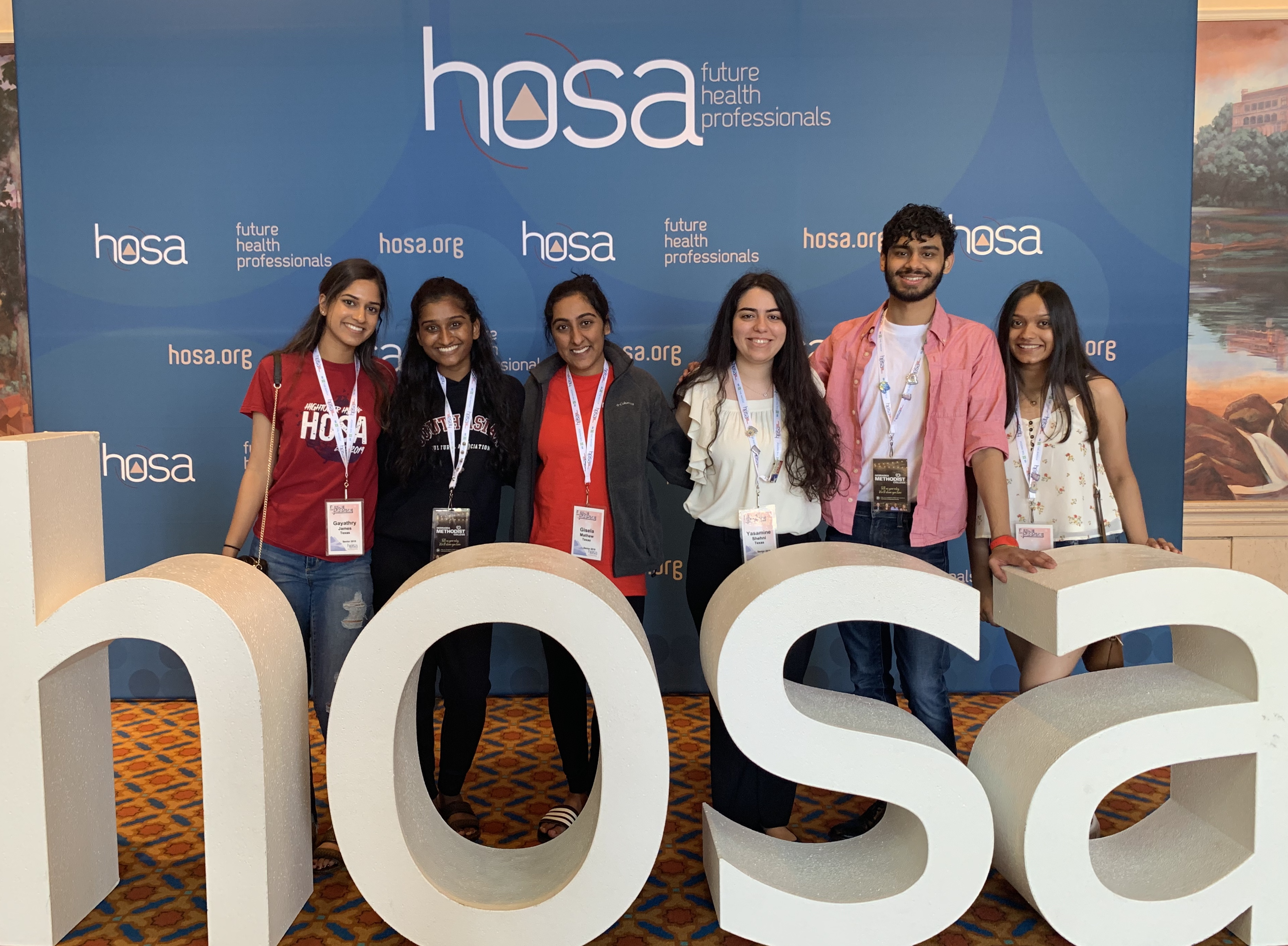
Hightower High School's Public Health team at HOSA ILC 2019.

In 2006, Hightower qualified 16 students for the National HOSA competition in Anaheim, of which all 16 placed top 4 or higher in their respective categories. In addition, 2 students qualified for the FBLA national competition in Nashville, Tennessee.

In 2007, Hightower High School qualified 31 students for the National HOSA Conference in Orlando, Florida, the most out of any school in the nation. They will compete in mid-June, 2007.

In 2008, Hightower High School qualified 38 students for the National HOSA Leadership Conference in Dallas, Texas. The team earned one gold, nine silver and eight bronze medals. Team members Jonathan Vo and Matthew Lei were also named to the mastery level of the Kaiser Permanente Medical Current Events Roster based on their placement in the top 10 in the United States.

In 2010, Hightower High School qualified 34 students for the National HOSA Leadership Conference in Orlando, Florida. The team earned 2 gold, 4 silver, and 2 bronze medals along with 15 other finalists that placed top 10 or higher.

Hightower High School originally had a Robotics team, which has placed in several local and statewide competitions. This program has since ended.

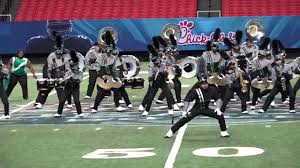
Hightower Marching Band, Peach Bowl

On the final week of 2015 (Dec 27-Jan 1), the Hightower High School "Hurricane" Marching Band was invited to perform at the 2015 Chick-Fil-A Peach Bowl on New Year's Eve, including a mass band, parade, and other competitions. They returned with (in Category 3) 3rd place Silver for field show, 1st place Gold for marching percussion, Honorable mention for parade, and Best Drum Major award.

In 2019, Hightower High School qualified 9 students for the National HOSA Leadership Conference in Orlando, Florida. The group consisting of Saeed Ahmed, Gayathry James, Gisela Mathew, Yasamine Shehni, Susan Varghese, and Natasha Verghese earned second place in the Secondary-Division event of Public Health Emergency Preparedness. Contender Isabella Gándara received a 'Highest Overall Score' award in the Secondary-Division of the Health Care Issues Exam.

== Feeder patterns ==
The following elementary schools feed into Hightower:

- Burton
- Goodman
- Palmer (partial)
- Parks

The following middle schools feed into Hightower:

- Lake Olympia (partial)

== Notable alumni ==
- Matthew Adams – Current NFL football player for the New York Giants.
- Bralon Addison
- D. J. Augustin – Former point guard for the University of Texas Longhorns and drafted to the Charlotte Bobcats. (Class of 2006)
- Caleb Douglas – Wide receiver for the Miami Dolphins
- Garlon Green
- Alonzo Highsmith Jr. - Area Scout for the Buffalo Bills
- Christopher G. Hollins – Harris County clerk, involved in the 2020 U.S. elections
- Danuel House Jr. – Professional basketball player for the Houston Rockets of the NBA (class of 2012)
- Sebastien Ibeagha – Current soccer player for FC Dallas of the MLS (Class of 2010)
- Eric Moreland
- Jeremy Payne – college football running back for the TCU Horned Frogs
- Cory Rodgers – Former football player for the NFL Green Bay Packers, and current player for the CFL BC Lions. (Class of 2002)
- Herbert Taylor – Former NFL Football player for the Kansas City Chiefs. (Class of 2002)
- Sauce Walka – Houston Rapper
