= Arcola, Texas =

- City
- Mottoes: "Country life in the city" Moving ahead in the 21st century"
- Interactive map of Arcola, Texas
- Coordinates: 29°30′5″N 95°27′50″W
- Country: United States
- State: Texas
- County: Fort Bend

Area
  - Total: 2.61 sq mi (6.75 km^{2})
  - Land: 2.57 sq mi (6.66 km^{2})
  - Water: 0.035 sq mi (0.09 km^{2})
- Elevation: 66 ft (20 m)

Population (2020)
  - Total: 2,034
  - Density: 791/sq mi (305/km^{2})
- Time zone: UTC-6 (Central (CST))
  - Summer (DST): UTC-5 (CDT)
- Area codes: 713, 281, 832, 346, 621
- FIPS code: 48-03708
- GNIS feature ID: 1329659
- Website: www.arcolatexas.org

Arcola is a city in Fort Bend County, Texas, United States, within the Houston–Pasadena–The Woodlands metropolitan area. The population was 2,034 as of the 2020 census, an increase over the figure of 1,642 tabulated by the 2010 census, which represented, in turn, an increase over the 2000 figure of 1,048.

Arcola incorporated in 1986.

== Geography ==
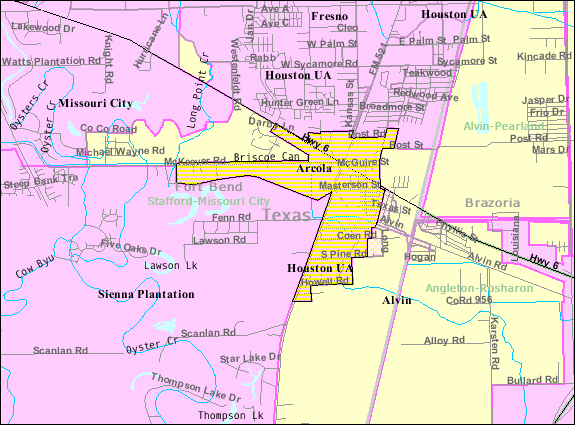
Map of Arcola

Arcola is located near the eastern edge of Fort Bend County at 29°30′5″N 95°27′50″W (29.501339, –95.463760). Texas State Highway 6 passes through the city, leading northwest 14 miles (23 km) to Sugar Land and southeast 14 miles to Alvin. Downtown Houston is 22 miles (35 km) to the north.

According to the United States Census Bureau, Arcola has a total area of 2.0 square miles (5.1 km^{2}), of which 0.02 square miles (0.05 km^{2}), or 0.98%, is water.

== Demographics ==
Historical population
Census	Pop.	Note	%±
1990	666		—
2000	1,048		57.4%
2010	1,642		56.7%
2020	2,034		23.9%
U.S. Decennial Census

=== Racial and ethnic composition ===
Arcola city, Texas – Racial and ethnic composition Note: the US Census treats Hispanic/Latino as an ethnic category. This table excludes Latinos from the racial categories and assigns them to a separate category. Hispanics/Latinos may be of any race.
Race / Ethnicity (NH = Non-Hispanic)	Pop 2000	Pop 2010	Pop 2020	% 2000	% 2010	% 2020
White alone (NH)	125	128	154	11.93%	7.80%	7.57%
Black or African American alone (NH)	344	458	457	32.82%	27.89%	22.47%
Native American or Alaska Native alone (NH)	0	2	1	0.00%	0.12%	0.05%
Asian alone (NH)	23	15	25	2.19%	0.91%	1.23%
Native Hawaiian or Pacific Islander alone (NH)	0	0	1	0.00%	0.00%	0.05%
Other race alone (NH)	1	2	2	0.10%	0.12%	0.10%
Mixed race or Multiracial (NH)	11	12	35	1.05%	0.73%	1.72%
Hispanic or Latino (any race)	544	1,025	1,359	51.91%	62.42%	66.81%
Total	1,048	1,642	2,034	100.00%	100.00%	100.00%

=== 2020 census ===
As of the 2020 census, Arcola had a population of 2,034, 621 households, and 487 families residing in the city. The median age was 29.9 years; 30.4% of residents were under the age of 18 and 9.2% of residents were 65 years of age or older. For every 100 females there were 91.0 males, and for every 100 females age 18 and over there were 88.4 males age 18 and over.

There were 621 households in Arcola, of which 52.7% had children under the age of 18 living in them. Of all households, 45.2% were married-couple households, 18.2% were households with a male householder and no spouse or partner present, and 29.6% were households with a female householder and no spouse or partner present. About 16.2% of all households were made up of individuals and 5.2% had someone living alone who was 65 years of age or older.

There were 684 housing units, of which 9.2% were vacant. Among occupied housing units, 65.2% were owner-occupied and 34.8% were renter-occupied. The homeowner vacancy rate was 3.8% and the rental vacancy rate was 4.4%.

97.1% of residents lived in urban areas, while 2.9% lived in rural areas.

Racial composition as of the 2020 census
Race	Percent
White	17.0%
Black or African American	22.8%
American Indian and Alaska Native	1.5%
Asian	1.4%
Native Hawaiian and Other Pacific Islander	<0.1%
Some other race	37.4%
Two or more races	20.0%
Hispanic or Latino (of any race)	66.8%

=== 2010 census ===
As of the census of 2010, there were 1,640 people, 295 households, and 233 families residing in the city. The population density was 548.5 inhabitants per square mile (211.8/km^{2}). There were 324 housing units at an average density of 169.6 per square mile (65.5/km^{2}). The racial makeup of the city was 34.26% White, 34.16% African American, 0.38% Native American, 2.19% Asian, 27.10% from other races, and 1.91% from two or more races. Hispanic or Latino of any race were 51.91% of the population.

There were 295 households, out of which 46.1% had children under the age of 18 living with them, 56.6% were married couples living together, 18.6% had a female householder with no husband present, and 20.7% were non-families. 16.6% of all households were made up of individuals, and 6.4% had someone living alone who was 65 years of age or older. The average household size was 3.55 and the average family size was 4.06.

In the city, the population was spread out, with 37.4% under the age of 18, 9.5% from 18 to 24, 28.5% from 25 to 44, 16.0% from 45 to 64, and 8.5% who were 65 years of age or older. The median age was 28 years. For every 100 females, there were 101.9 males. For every 100 females age 18 and over, there were 92.9 males.

The median income for a household in the city was $31,607, and the median income for a family was $32,500. Males had a median income of $26,818 versus $21,172 for females. The per capita income for the city was $11,735. About 24.3% of families and 26.8% of the population were below the poverty line, including 34.3% of those under age 18 and 26.4% of those age 65 or over.

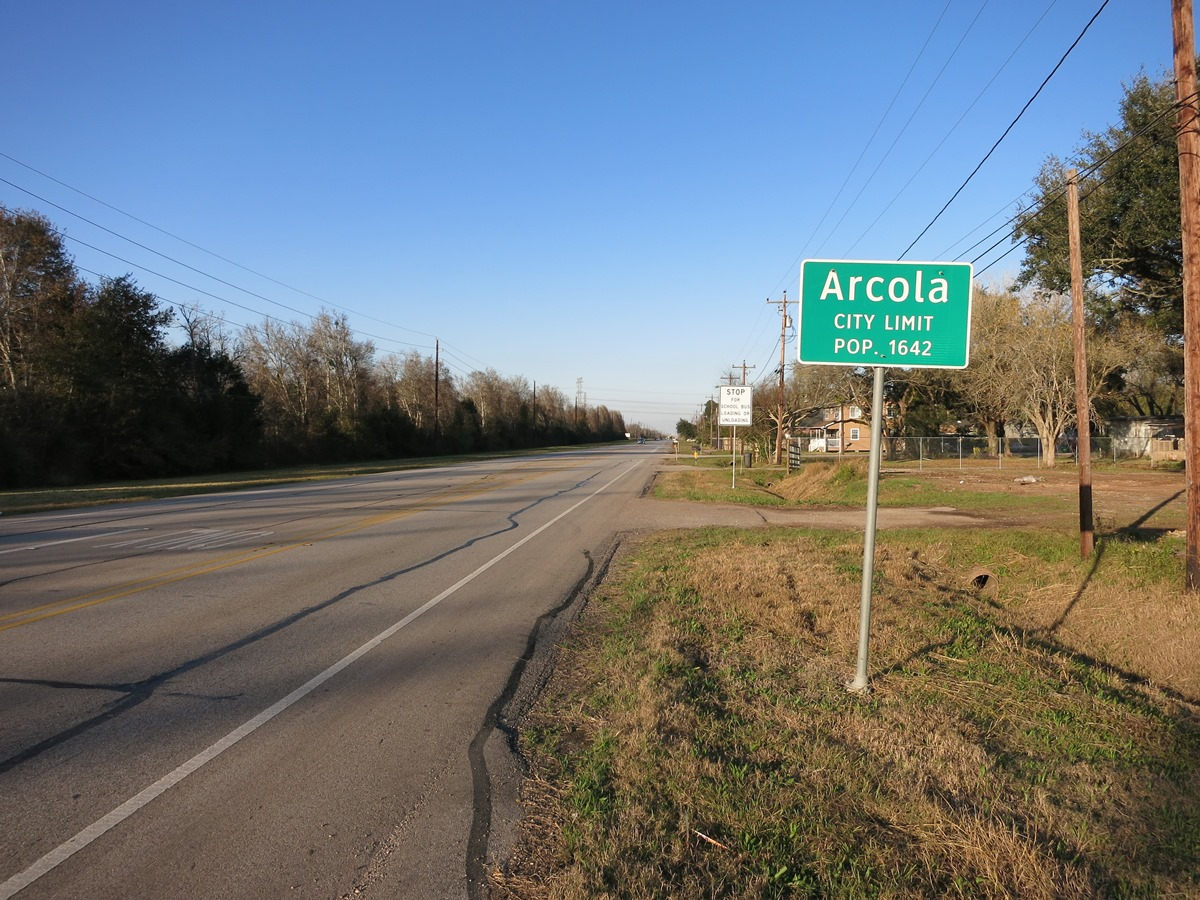
Arcola city limit sign is on FM 521 between Sears Road and Glendale Lakes Drive. The view is north.

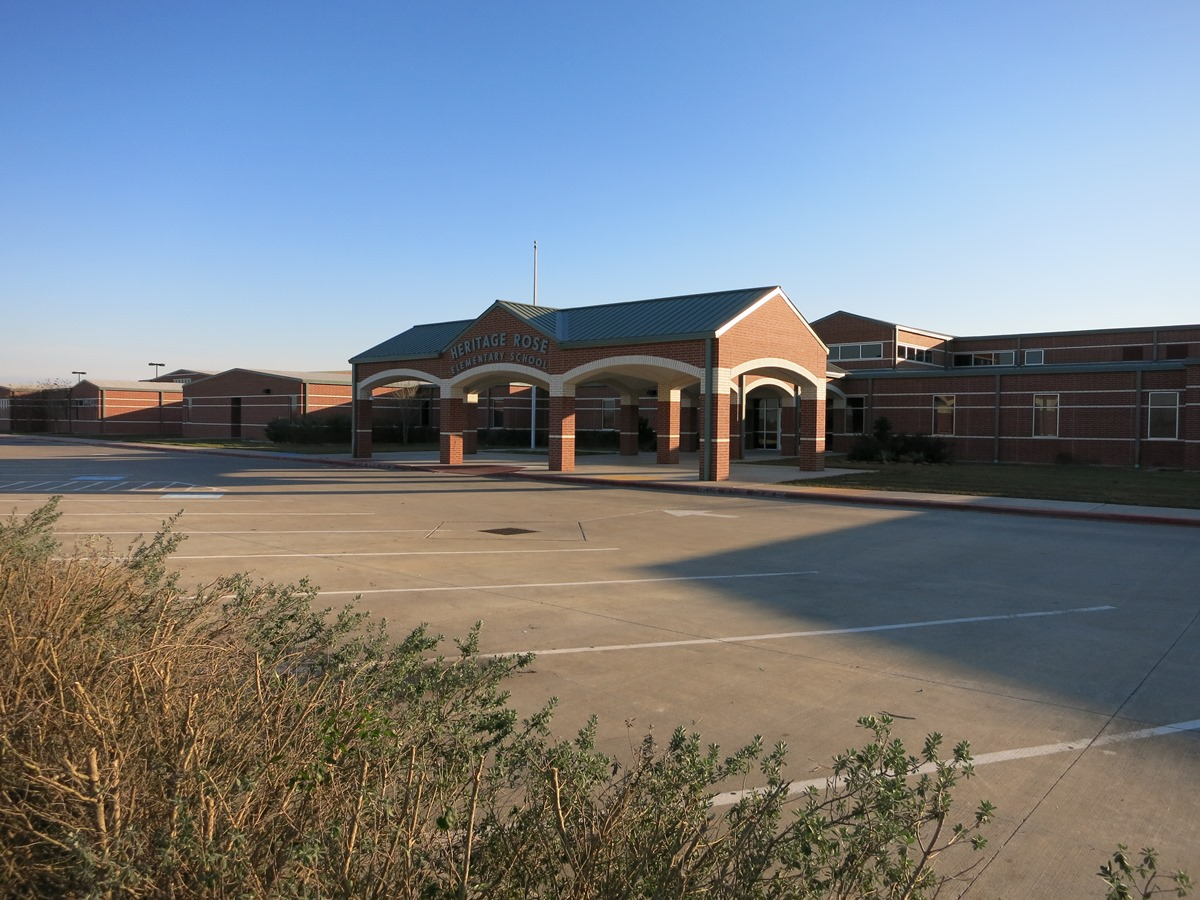
Heritage Rose Elementary School of Fort Bend ISD is on Glendale Lakes Drive to the south of Arcola.

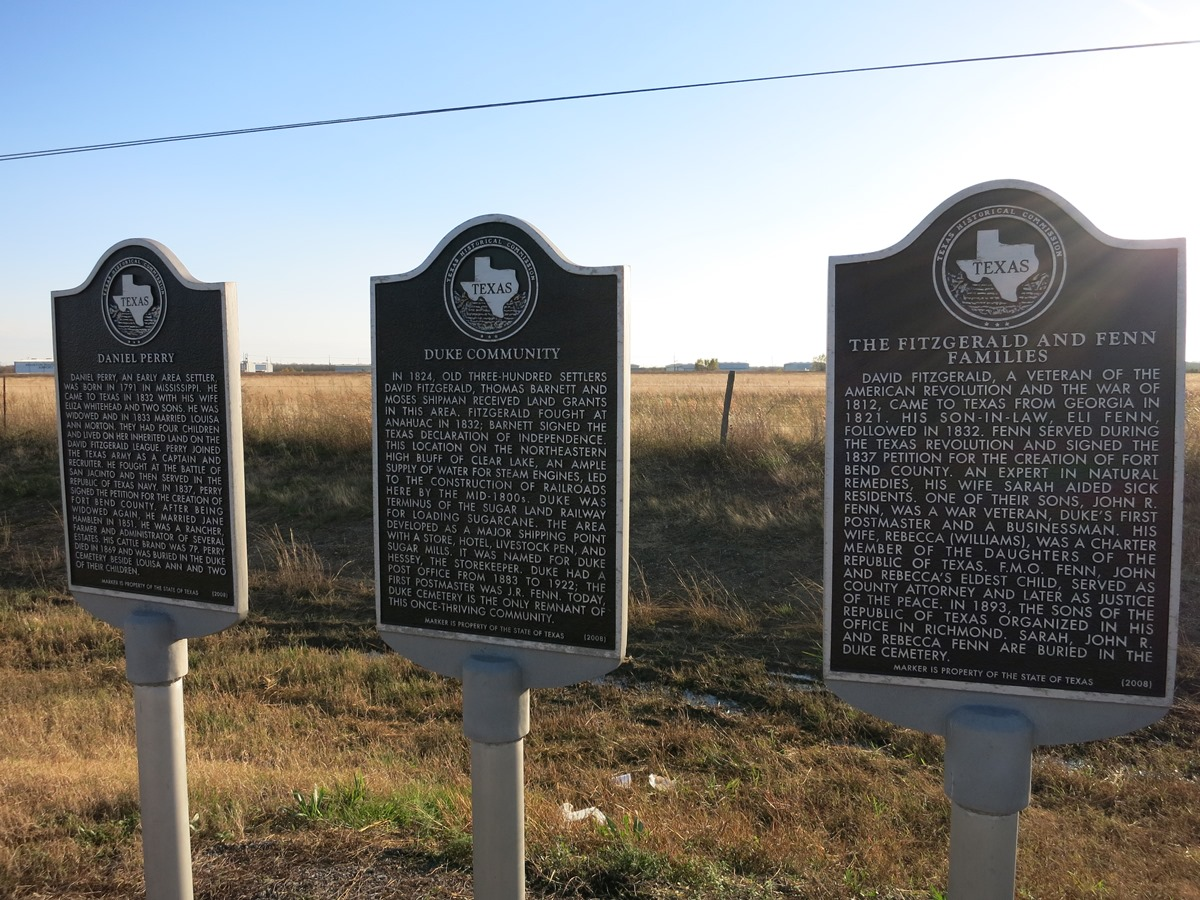
Three state historical markers on Highway 6 in Arcola tell about several of the area's early settlers.

== Government and infrastructure ==
Law enforcement is provided by the Arcola Police Department, The Police Chief is Michael V. Ellison. Fire protection is provided by the Fresno Fire Department. Emergency medical service is provided by Fort Bend County EMS.

Fort Bend County does not have a hospital district. OakBend Medical Center serves as the county's charity hospital which the county contracts with.

== Education ==
Arcola pupils attend schools in Fort Bend Independent School District (FBISD). FBISD formed in 1959 by the consolidation of Missouri City Independent School District and the Sugar Land Independent School District.

The community is within the East Division, controlling school board slots 5 through 7. Most of the city is zoned to Heritage Rose Elementary School, Fendell Henry Elementary School Thornton Middle School, Amy Coleman Middle School and Almeta Crawford High School. The section north and east of Texas State Highway 6 and north and west of Farm to Market Road 521 is zoned to Burton Elementary School, Lake Olympia Middle School, and Hightower High School.

The Texas Legislature specifies that the Houston Community College (HCC) boundary includes "the part of the Fort Bend Independent School District that is not located in the service area of the Wharton County Junior College District and that is adjacent to the Houston Community College System District." Wharton College's boundary within FBISD is defined only as the City of Sugar Land and the ETJ of Sugar Land, Arcola is in neither location. Arcola is in HCC.

=== History of schools ===
At the time FBISD formed, in 1959, there was one school for black students in Arcola, Oaklane Elementary School, serving grades 1–8. Black students in grades 9–12 were assigned to M.R. Wood School in Sugar Land. White students, at the time, were assigned to an elementary school in Missouri City, a junior high school in Sugar Land, and a high school in Missouri City. Those sites now house E. A. Jones Elementary School, Lakeview Elementary School, and Missouri City Middle School, respectively. Dulles High School became established as the white high school of FBISD. Desegregation occurred in 1965, and Oaklane closed at that time. Oaklane students were reassigned to Blue Ridge Elementary School in Blue Ridge, now a part of Houston. Dulles Junior High School served as FBISD's sole junior high school from March 1965 to August 1975. After desegregation, Dulles High was the only zoned high school in the district until Willowridge High School in Houston opened in 1979.

Previously all pupils north of State Highway 6 attended Burton Elementary School in unincorporated Fort Bend County. Some pupils south of Highway 6 attended Sienna Crossing Elementary School, and other pupils south of Highway 6 attended Schiff Elementary School in unincorporated Fort Bend County.

Prior to the opening of Hightower in 1998, Elkins High School served Arcola. After 1998 and prior to 2010 all Arcola pupils were zoned to Hightower. Prior to 2018, most of Arcola was zoned to Baines MS. In 2018 much of Arcola was rezoned to Thornton Middle School. Prior to 2023, portions of Arcola south of Highway 6 were zoned to Ridge Point High School; that year, they were rezoned to Crawford.

== Transportation ==
Houston Southwest Airport, a general aviation airport, is in the Arcola city limits.

Texas State Highway 6 and FM 521 are the main highways at Arcola

Texas State Highway 288 is to the east of Arcola and to the west Fort Bend Parkway Toll Road. Both are used by many Arcola residents.

Another way to access Texas State Highway 288 is through Juliff-Manvel Rd or in Brazoria County as County Road 57.
