= Elkins High School (Missouri City, Texas) =

Public high school in Missouri City, Texas, U.S.

Coordinates: 29.5452°N 95.5581°W

Lawrence E Elkins High School

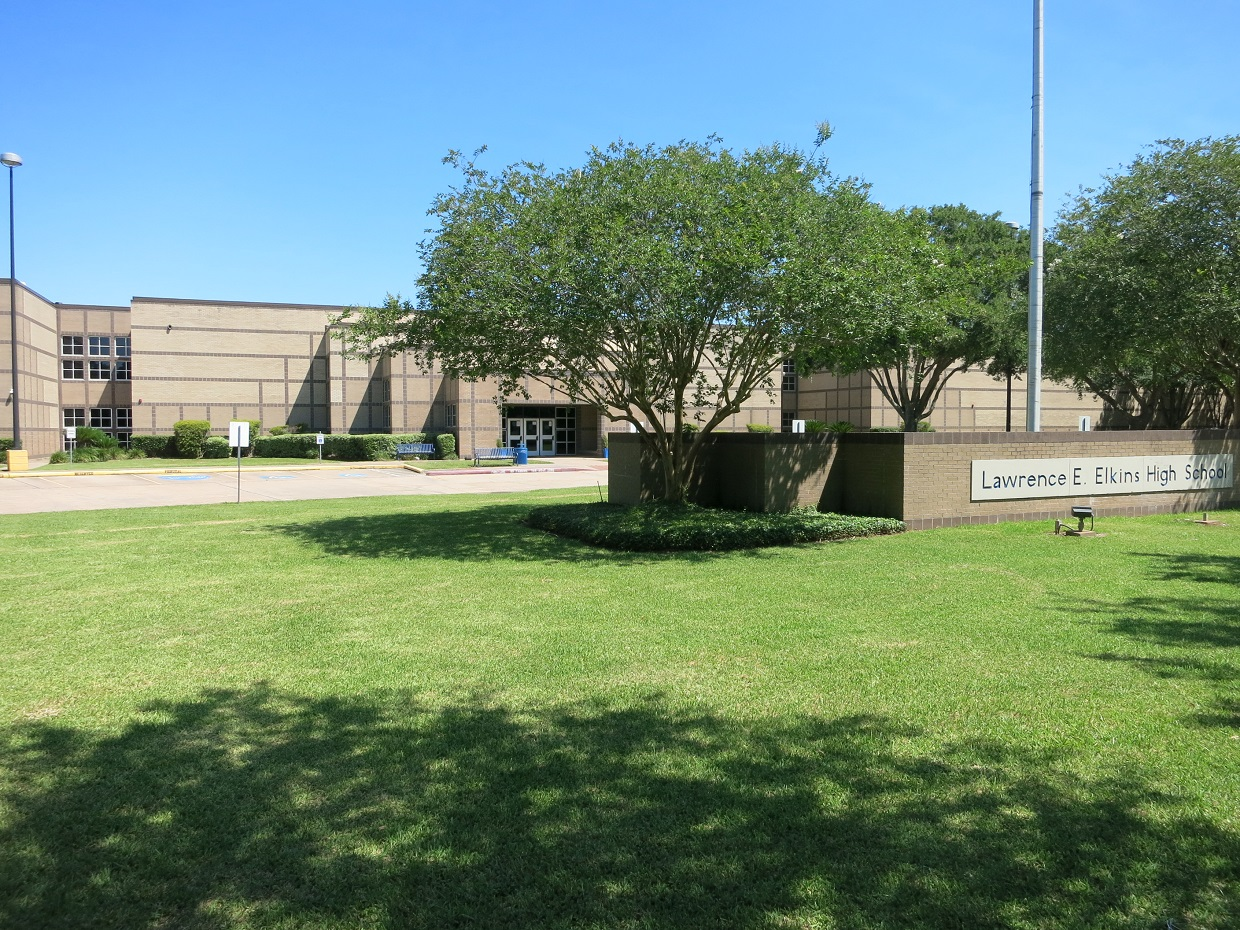
- Lawrence E. Elkins High School as pictured in June 2020

Location
- 7007 Knights Court; Missouri City, Texas 77459; United States

Information
- Type: Public
- Established: 1992
- School district: Fort Bend ISD
- Principal: Courtney Muceus
- Staff: 140.38 (FTE)
- Grades: 9–12
- Enrollment: 2,718 (2023-2024)
- Student to teacher ratio: 19.36
- Colors: Royal Blue and Gold
- Nickname: Knights
- 2011 TEA Rating: Recognized
- Website: Elkins High School

Lawrence E. Elkins High School, more commonly known as Elkins High School is a comprehensive public high school in Missouri City, Texas, that serves communities in Sugar Land and Missouri City. The school, which handles grades 9 through 12, is a part of the Fort Bend Independent School District. Elkins was established in 1992, with its first graduating class in 1995. It was named after a former educator who worked in FBISD from 1949 to 1984.

Elkins received a Blue Ribbon Award from the United States Department of Education in 2002. In addition, Elkins high school was ranked 715th among the top 1000 schools in the United States by Newsweek in 2005. The Washington Post also ranked Elkins High School among the Top High Schools in the Nation in 2011.

== History ==
Lawrence E. Elkins High School was established as a grade 9 and 10 school in the fall of 1992 to alleviate overcrowding from three other district high schools, Dulles, Clements, and Willowridge. Elkins was FBISD's fifth comprehensive high school.

On May 17, 2024, rapper and alumnus Travis Scott gifted the graduating class of 2024, 600 free pairs of Air Jordan 1 Low Canary Yellows, a pair of Nike shoes utilizing Elkins’ school colors as a tribute.

== Neighborhoods served ==
Areas served by the school include Quail Valley, Meadow Creek, Lake Olympia, and all of Riverstone.

It formerly served Arcola, Fresno, Juliff, and parts of the area near Rosharon in Fort Bend County.

== Engineering Academy ==
The Engineering Academy at Elkins informs and encourages students to learn about the potential of a career in engineering. Courses include Introduction to Engineering Design, Engineering Science, Civil Engineering, Engineering Development & Design and Aerospace Engineering.

== Academic competition ==
- Math and science club (UIL and TMSCA)
  - 1st place TMSCA state 2025
- Speech and debate (TFA and NSDA)
  - 1st place duet interpretation state 2007
  - 1st place TFA State Domestic Extemp 2024 (Robert Zhang)
  - National Champion in NSDA United States Extemporaneous Speaking 2025 (Robert Zhang)
- UIL academics
  - 1st place conference 5A state academic champions, 1994–95
  - 1st place conference 5A state academic champions, 1995–96
  - Calculator applications
    - 1st place state 1996
    - 1st place state 2001
    - 1st place state 2004
    - 1st place state 2025
  - Mathematics
    - 1st place state 2025
  - Number sense
    - 1st place state 1996
  - Science
    - 1st place 1996
- Constitutional law
  - 1st place state 2005, 2008, 2011
  - National Champion 2008
- AFJROTC TX-932:
  - Academics Awards:
    - 1st place altitude Rocketry meet, 2005
    - 1st place Drift Rocketry meet, 2005
  - Drill Team Awards:
    - 1st place Male Color Guard Fort Bend Drill Comp 2009

== Athletics ==
=== Clements / Elkins rivalry ===
In 1992, after Elkins was built to alleviate overcrowding from William P. Clements High School, zoning issues forced many families in different subdivisions around the city of Sugar Land to send their children to both high schools. Still today, it is not uncommon to find next door neighbors or siblings going to opposing schools as feeder middle schools and zoning patterns overlap.

In 1996, after an outbreak of senior pranks between the two schools, the principals of both high schools decided to focus the rivalry in a less destructive manner. After meeting with both schools' Student Councils, the principals decided to hold an annual, year-long competition.

Each school's athletic program can earn points based on wins against the other school in UIL competition. The competitions include: boys' football, basketball, baseball, and soccer, and girls' volleyball, basketball, softball, and soccer. A school earns one point when it defeats the rival school. A game ending in a tie score will award both teams one-half point. As often occurs, the schools sometimes meet more than once per year. In the event of a tie for the overall competition, the school's band that is ranked the highest at the Texas UIL regional marching band competition will be the year's winner.

Since 1997, the schools have held the competition every year. As both schools' mascots (the Ranger and the Knight) typically ride horses, the "Golden Horse" trophy is awarded and displayed in the champion school's trophy case at the beginning of each new school year.

== Notable alumni ==
- Cornelius Anthony – San Francisco 49ers football player (class of 1996)
- Pat Batteaux – NFL player (class of 1996)
- Jimmy Blacklock - Chief Justice of the Supreme Court of Texas
- Ross Blacklock – NFL defensive end for the Houston Texans (class of 2016)
- KaRon Coleman – gridiron football player (class of 1996)
- Matt Carpenter – MLB player with the San Diego Padres (class of 2004)
- R'Bonney Gabriel – Miss USA 2022 and Miss Universe 2022
- Keli Goff – Journalist, TV writer and Emmy nominated producer
- Tristan Gray – MLB infielder (Class of 2014)
- D.J. Hayden – NFL cornerback for Oakland Raiders, Detroit Lions (class of 2008)
- Chad Huffman – MLB and NPB outfielder
- James Loney – MLB first baseman for Los Angeles Dodgers, Tampa Bay Rays (class of 2002)
- Jake Matthews – former Texas A&M University offensive lineman and current Atlanta Falcons tackle (class of 2010)
- Kevin Matthews – former Texas A&M football player and NFL offensive lineman (class of 2005)
- Jamal Marshall – football player, North Texas and Seattle Seahawks cornerback (class of 2012)
- J'Mon Moore – NFL player
- Kenneth Murray – former Oklahoma football player and current NFL Linebacker (class of 2017)
- N3on – livestreamer and youtuber
- Braylon Payne – baseball player
- Kendrick Sampson – actor who has been on television shows such as How To Get Away with Murder and The Vampire Diaries
- Travis Scott – rapper, singer, and record producer
- Crystle Stewart – Miss USA 2008
- Corey Thompson – NFL player
- Kip Wells – former American professional baseball pitcher (class of 1995)
- Donovan Williams – NBA player

== Notoriety ==
=== Cyber-bullying ===
Girls from Elkins and the other Fort Bend High Schools of Dulles and Clements, were cyber-bullied in April 2010 on a Facebook page titled Whimsical Girls of FBISD. The page listed several female students on each school's "naughty" list. Police and the school district were unable to determine who was responsible for the page, but Facebook took the page down at the district's request.

=== Advanced placement desks controversy ===
In the 2022-2023 school year, Elkins had 1,609 students testing for Advanced Placement courses, an increase of 335 from the 2021-2022 school year. While students were taking AP exams in May, 2023, desks from classrooms were moved to the gymnasium, causing some classrooms to be short on desks, and forcing many students who were not testing for AP courses to sit on the floor. This incident caused uproar among the parents of the school.

== Feeder patterns ==
The following elementary schools feed into Elkins:

- Austin Parkway (partial)
- Commonwealth (partial)
- Lantern Lane
- Lexington Creek (partial)
- Palmer (partial)
- Quail Valley
- Settlers Way (partial)
- Anne Sullivan (partial)
- Sonal Bhuchar (adjacent to Elkins)

The following middle schools feed into Elkins:

- Fort Settlement (partial)
- First Colony (partial)
- Lake Olympia (partial)
- Sartartia (partial)
- Quail Valley (partial)
