= Johnstown High School =

Coordinates: 43.009994°N 74.38353°W

Location
- 1 Sir Bills Cir; Johnstown, New York

Information
- School type: High school
- Teaching staff: 47.00 (FTE)
- Grades: 8-12
- Enrollment: 557 (2023-2024)
- Student to teacher ratio: 11.85

Johnstown Jr.-Senior High School is a public high school located at 1 Sir Bills Circle, in Johnstown, New York. Part of the Greater Johnstown School District, the school provides education in grades 8-12. It offers various athletic activities such as soccer, football, track and field, lacrosse, cheerleading, basketball, and has a FOJO swim team. Johnstown Jr.-Senior School also offers many extracurricular activities such as Jazz Band, Marching Band, Theatre Productions, Science Club, Student Council, and National Honor Society. As of the 2024-2025 school year, the principal is Scott Hale.

== Notable alumni ==
- Barbara McMartin (1931–2005), class of 1949, PhD in mathematics from City University of New York; environmental activist and author of 25 books on the Adirondack Mountains and park.
- Morgan Romano (1998-), class of 2016, Miss USA 2022
