= Jamal Marshall =

American gridiron football player (born 1993)

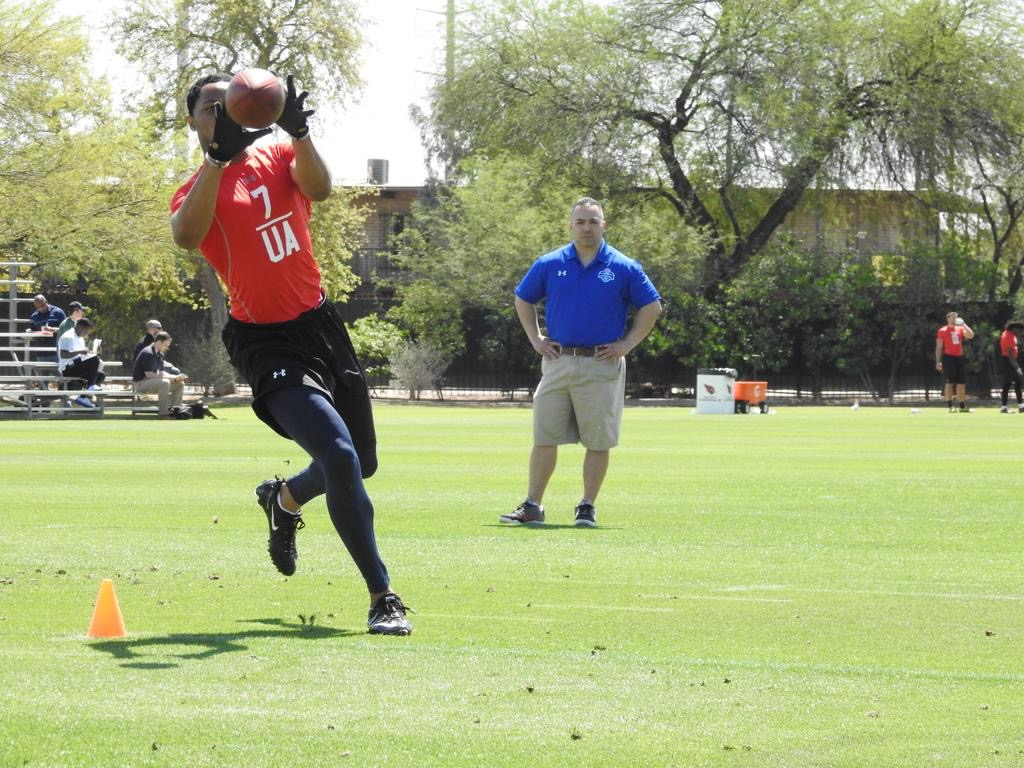
- Jamal Marshall at pro player combine

Profile
- Position: Cornerback

Personal information
- Born: July 3, 1993 (age 33); Columbus, Georgia, U.S.
- Listed height: 6 ft 3 in (1.91 m)
- Listed weight: 208 lb (94 kg)

Career information
- High school: Elkins (Missouri City, Texas)
- College: North Texas

Career history
- Seattle Seahawks (2016–2017)*; Seattle Seahawks (2017-2018); Montreal Alouettes (2019)*; Houston Texans (2019)*
- * Offseason or practice squad member only

Jamal Marshall (born July 3, 1993) is an American former football cornerback. He played college football at North Texas. He was signed by the Seattle Seahawks in 2016.

== Early life ==
Marshall was late to football only playing varsity his senior year finishing with 46 tackles, 20 PBUs and seven sacks as a senior while also running track at Elkins. Marshall had a highly decorated high school track career. He was a member of the 4 x 400 m relay team that made it to state in 2011, the following year Marshall made it to state in the 400 metres dash where he placed 5th with a 47.60 . Aldrich Bailey placing first with a time of 45.8. Marshall's personal best in high jump was 6'4 and running a 21.50 in the 200 metres dash.

== College career ==
Marshall received an athletic scholarship to attend University of North Texas, where he played for the North Texas Mean Green football team from 2012 to 2015. He began his career at North Texas as a Cornerback and played as a true freshman mainly on special teams. He switched to Outside linebacker after his freshman year due to high potential seen by the coaching staff. He shadowed outside linebacker Will Wright until his junior where he finally had his break out year at linebacker. Marshall saw action in all 12 games, notching 54 total tackles, including 36 solo, and 7.5 TFL. The prior year he had 27 tackles saw action in all 12 games and notched a season high of five tackles against Tulane. During the Heart of Dallas Bowl game he forced a key turnover sparking his path at linebacker. Heading into his final year Marshall decided to go back to his original position, cornerback. His switch back to corner lead him to have a down year only racking up 19 tackles and 3 Pbus.

Marshall also competed in track & field at North Texas as a relay sprinter, helping the 4 × 400 m relay team reach the regional meet with a time of 3:09.01. He also competed in the 200 m dash and set a time of 20.98

== Professional career ==
Pre-draft measurables
Height	Weight	Arm length	Hand span	40-yard dash	10-yard split	20-yard split	20-yard shuttle	Three-cone drill	Vertical jump	Broad jump	Bench press
6 ft 3 in (1.91 m)	213 lb (97 kg)	33.5 in (0.85 m)	9.75 in (0.25 m)	4.41 s	1.56 s	2.55 s	4.11 s	6.77 s	43 in (1.09 m)	11 ft 3 in (3.43 m)	10 reps
All values from NFL Combine and Pro Day

Marshall was signed to the Seattle Seahawks after impressing coaches after the three day rookie Mini-camp in 2016 as a tryout player. He was waived on June 1, 2017. He signed again with the Seattle Seahawks in the 2017 preseason.

== Mixed martial arts career ==
Jamal Marshall
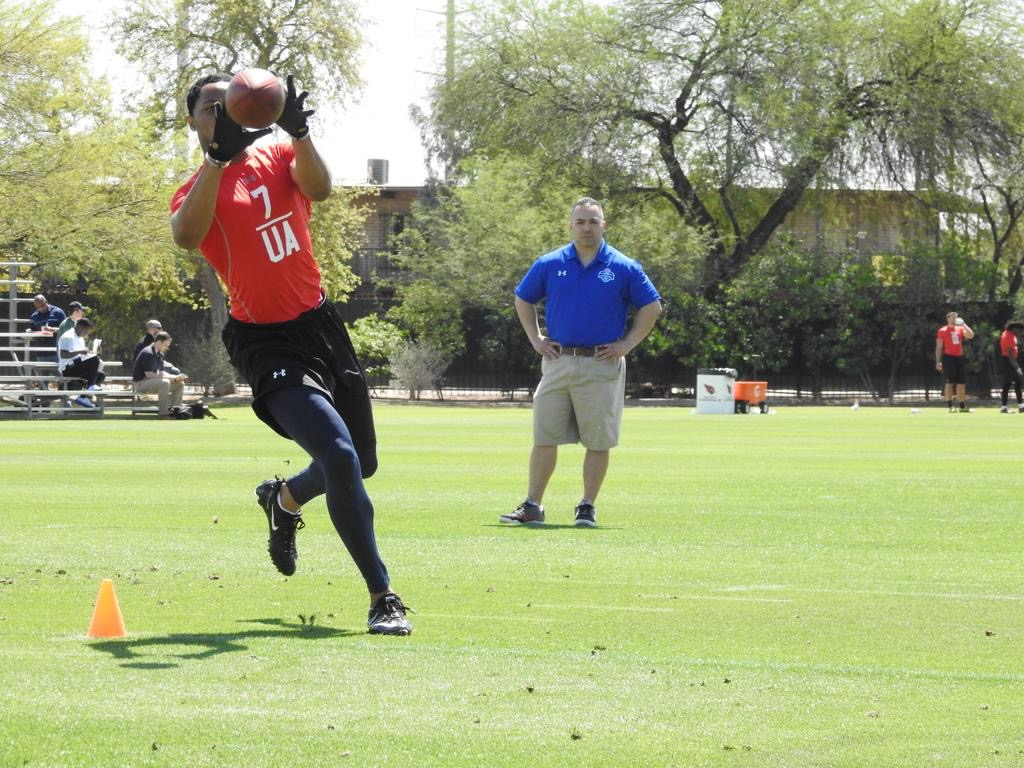
- Other names: Diamond
- Height: 6 ft 3 in (1.91 m)
- Weight: 185 lb (84 kg)
- Division: Middleweight
- Reach: 82 in (208 cm)
- Fighting out of: Houston, Texas United States
- Team: Paradigm
- Years active: 2018–present

Mixed martial arts record
- Total: 1
- Wins: 0
- Losses: 1
- By submission: 1

Amateur record
- Total: 5
- Wins: 5
- By knockout: 1

In October 2018, Marshall announced he would start an MMA career and had been training for several months, although he had no previous experience in mixed martial arts. Marshall made his amateur MMA debut on November 2, 2018, in which he was defeated by Isaac Moreno via submission in the final round. Since making his debut however, Marshall has not competed in any professional fights.
