= DeWalt, Missouri City, Texas =

- Neighborhood
- Location within Texas Location within the United States
- Coordinates: 29°33′24″N 95°33′24″W
- Country: United States
- State: Texas
- County: Fort Bend
- Elevation: 72 ft (22 m)
- Time zone: UTC-6 (Central (CST))
  - Summer (DST): UTC-5 (CDT)
- ZIP code: 77459
- Area codes: Mostly 281 also 713, 832
- GNIS feature ID: 1334312

DeWalt or Dewalt was an unincorporated area in Fort Bend County, in the U.S. state of Texas. The former community was located on State Highway 6 (SH 6) between Oilfield Road and Farm to Market Road 1092 (FM 1092). DeWalt has been absorbed by the municipality of Missouri City, a Houston suburb. Though Dewalt was noted on highway signs as late as 2013, there are few surviving structures and locations from the original community. In 2006, the Dew Plantation's house was moved from DeWalt to nearby Kitty Hollow Park to preserve it as a museum. The private Dewalt Cemetery still exists within the Lake Olympia subdivision.

== Geography ==
DeWalt was situated along SH 6 near its junctions with Oilfield Road (now Scenic Rivers Drive), which goes west, and DeWalt Road (now Lake Olympia Parkway), which heads east. A second source placed DeWalt about a mile northeast at SH 6 and FM 1092. Both intersections are surrounded now by commercial and residential areas. DeWalt was about 5 miles (8 km) southeast of U.S. Route 59 (US 59) in Sugar Land. Lake Olympia Parkway crosses southeast-flowing Oyster Creek by a bridge about 0.1 miles (0.2 km) east of SH 6.

The private, gated DeWalt Cemetery is located 1.8 miles (2.9 km) east within a neighborhood near Lake Olympia Parkway. DeWalt (as "Dewalt") is still used in FCC records as the geographical location for some services broadcasting from the several tall towers northeast of the original community.

The historic Dew Plantation House had been in DeWalt. It was moved about 3 miles (5 km) southeast to county-operated Kitty Hollow Park in 2006 by Fort Bend County and the Fort Bend Museum Association. The building was renovated and now serves as the DeWalt Heritage Center. The DeWalt Heritage Society was formed as part of the Fort Bend County Museum Association to oversee preservation.

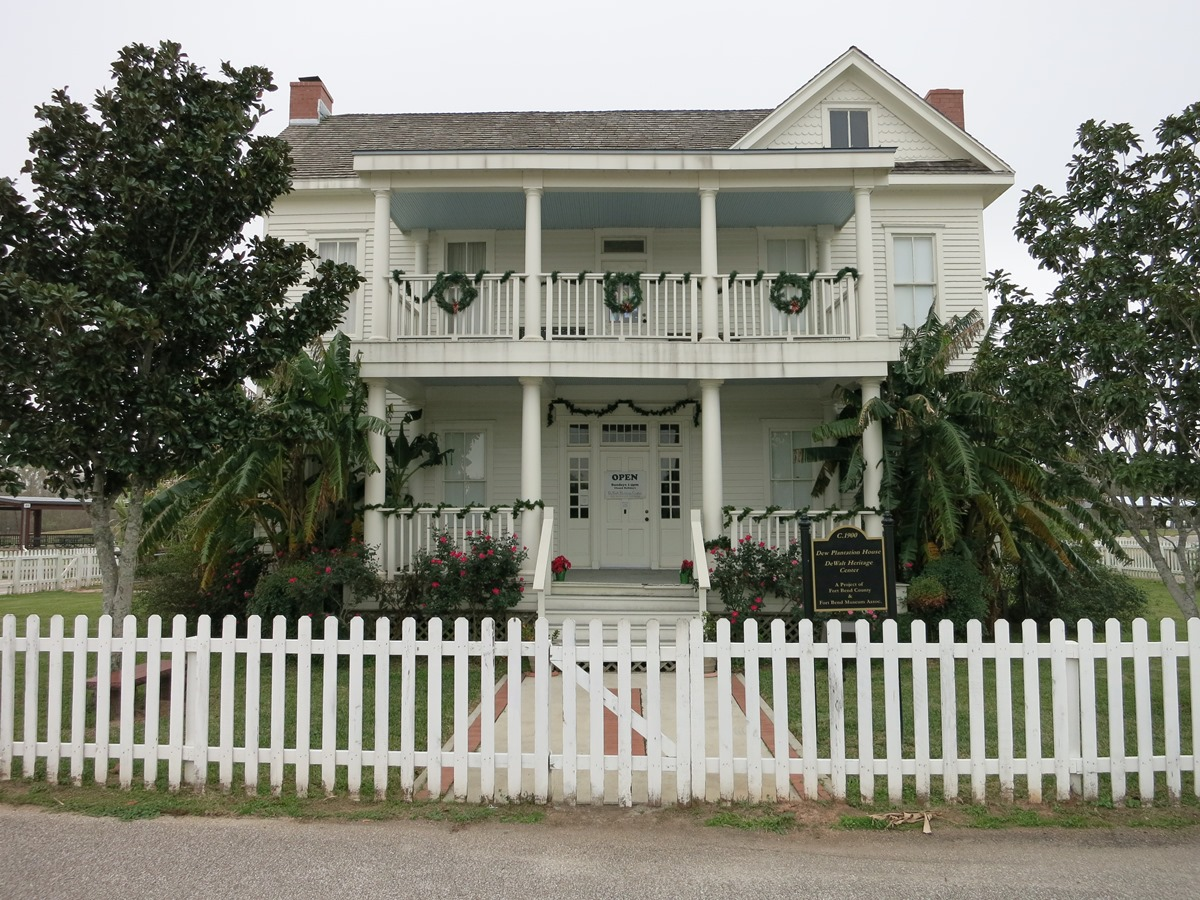
In 2006 the Dew Plantation House was moved to Kitty Hollow Park to serve as a museum.

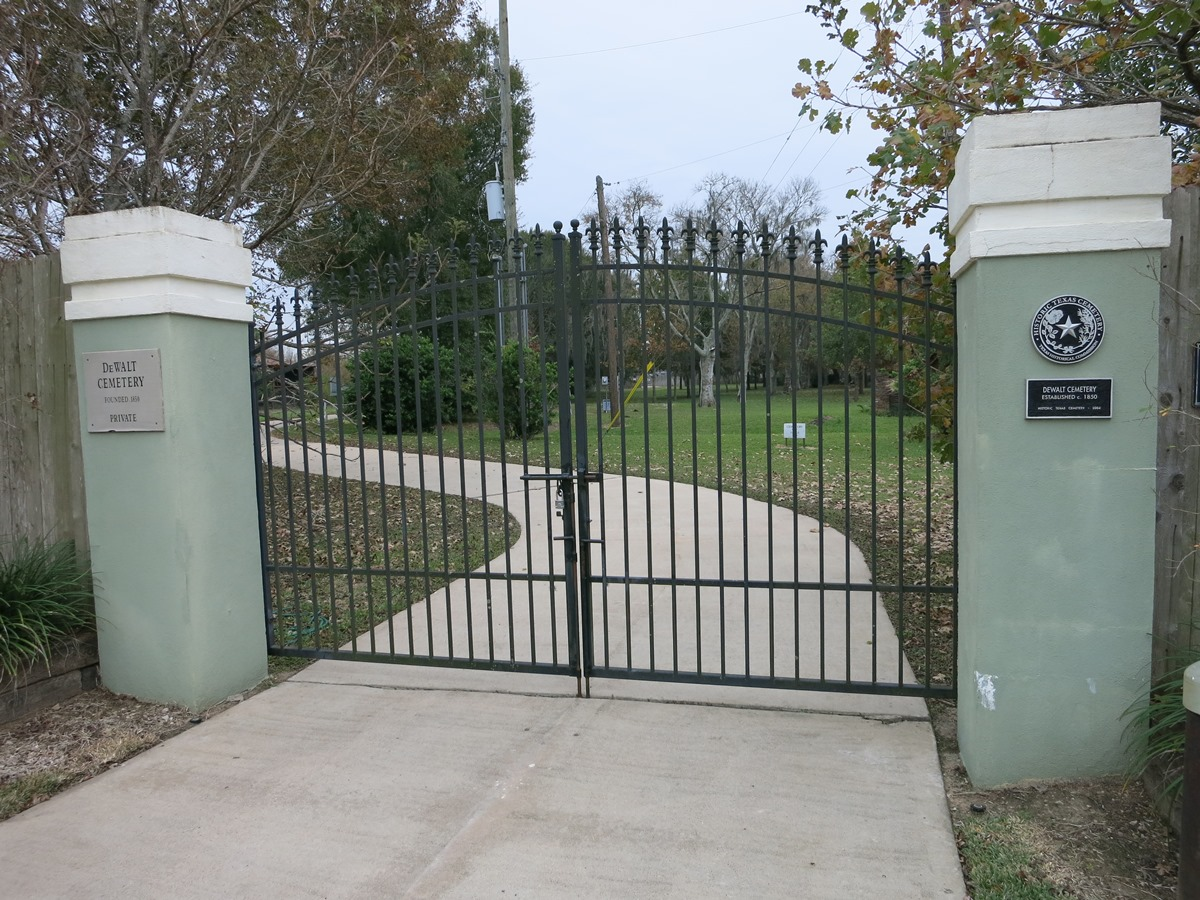
The private DeWalt Cemetery in Missouri City was established in 1850.

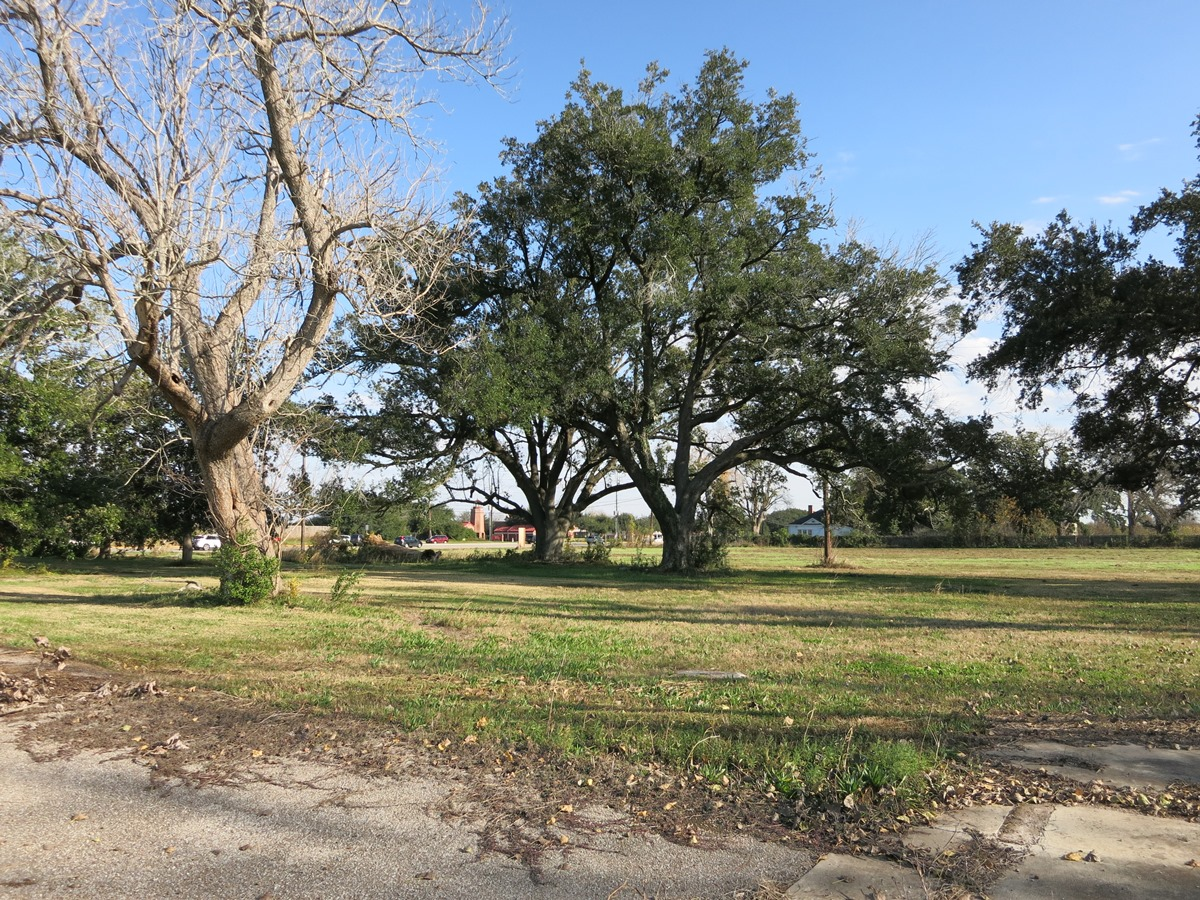
The original homesite for the Dew House along Highway 6 north of Oilfield Road was for sale in 2013.

== History ==
There was a sugar plantation in the vicinity in the 1850s owned by Thomas Waters DeWalt. After the Civil War, which ended in 1865, the plantation was subdivided and populated by an African-American community. By 1914, 100 people lived in DeWalt. The Sugar Land Railway passed through the town starting in 1912 until about 1980.

Missouri City acquired the previously unincorporated area with annexations in 1965 and 1980.

== Government and infrastructure ==
Fort Bend County does not have a hospital district. OakBend Medical Center serves as the county's charity hospital which the county contracts with.

== Education ==
DeWalt had been in Missouri City Independent School District prior to its consolidation into Fort Bend Independent School District in 1959.
