= Trammels, Missouri City, Texas =

- Neighborhood
- Location within the state of Texas Trammels (the United States)
- Coordinates: 29°32′05″N 95°32′15″W
- Country: United States
- State: Texas
- County: Fort Bend
- Elevation: 66 ft (20 m)
- Time zone: UTC-6 (Central (CST))
  - Summer (DST): UTC-5 (CDT)
- ZIP code: 77459
- Area codes: 281, 713, 832
- GNIS feature ID: 1379172

Trammels (sometimes spelled Trammells) was an unincorporated area near State Highway 6 in eastern Fort Bend County, Texas, United States.

== Location ==
Trammels was located on the southwestern side of Oyster Creek, twenty miles east of Richmond, at the junction of a graded and drained road and what later was designated as McKeever Road (which paralleled the railroad tracks in this vicinity). It was about one mile west of the present-day junction of Texas State Highway 6 and Trammel-Fresno (sic) Road. This is near what later became the south terminus of the Fort Bend Tollway, approximately halfway between U.S. Highway 59 and State Highway 288. The remnants of Trammels are within the city limits of Missouri City, a Houston suburb, after having been annexed in October 1981.

== History ==
Little is known regarding the early history of the town, though there are some records of the development of the neighboring town of DeWalt, of which community Trammels became a part. In 1936, Trammels had a row of dwellings, one business, and five farm units. Although it appeared on county maps, population statistics were never recorded.

== Transportation ==
Trammels was a station stop on the Gulf Coast Lines' Sugar Land Railway, with one mixed train scheduled daily except Sunday between Sugar Land and Anchor in 1925.

== See also ==
- Official Guide of the Railways, February 1926, page 743
