= Missouri City, Texas =

- City
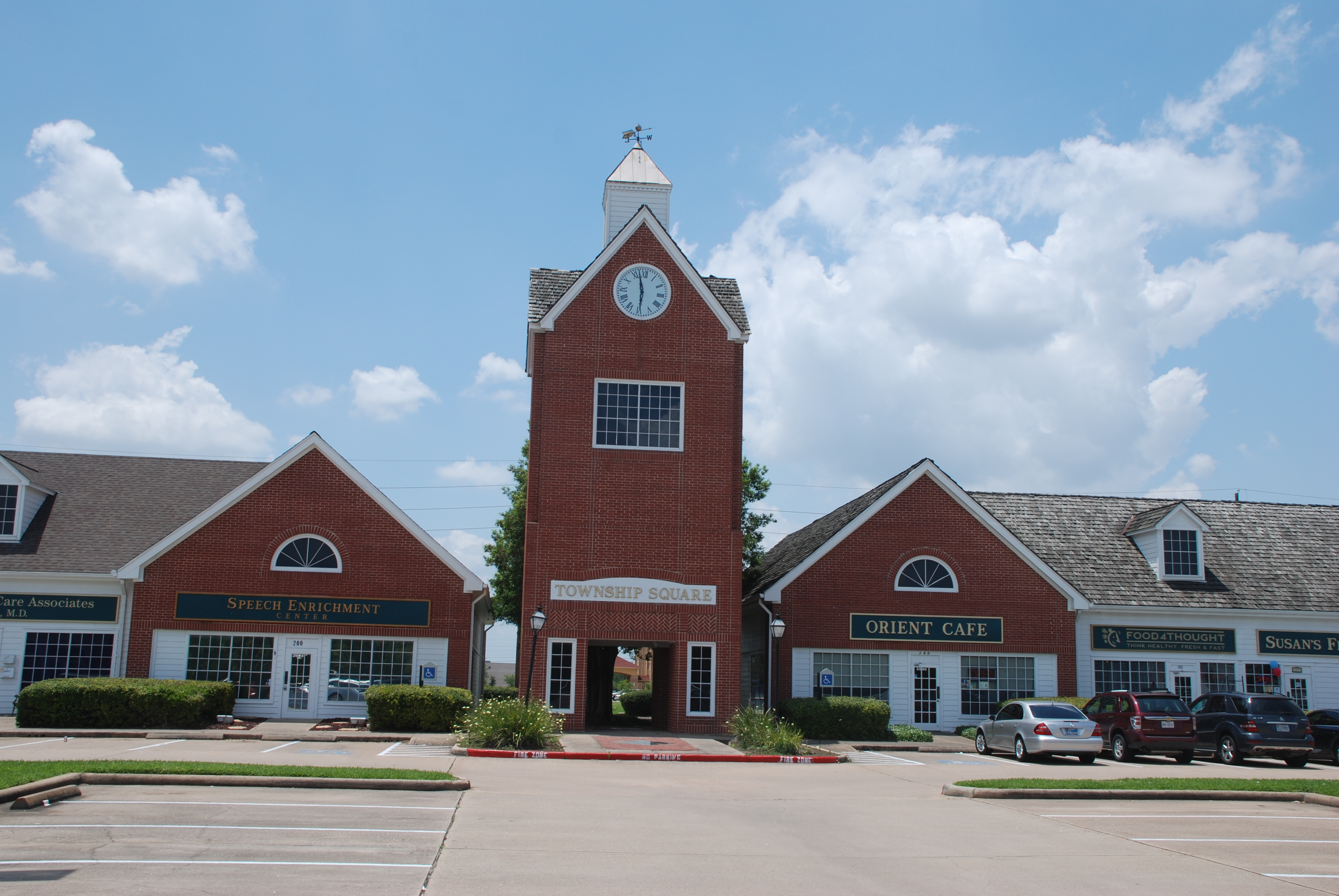
- Township Square

- Seal
- Motto(s): Mo City, The Show Me City
- Location in Fort Bend and Harris counties in the state of Texas
- Coordinates: 29°37′07″N 95°32′16″W
- Country: United States
- State: Texas
- Counties: Fort Bend, Harris
- Incorporated: March 13, 1956

Government
  - Type: Council-Manager
  - City Council: Mayor Robin Elackatt; Sonya Brown-Marshall; Lynn Clouser; Monica Riley; Sharita Thompson; Johanna Ouderkirk; Floyd Emery
  - City Manager: Angel Jones

Area
  - Total: 30.39 sq mi (78.72 km^{2})
  - Land: 29.01 sq mi (75.14 km^{2})
  - Water: 1.38 sq mi (3.58 km^{2})
- Elevation: 75 ft (23 m)

Population (2020)
  - Total: 74,259
  - Density: 2,601.1/sq mi (1,004.28/km^{2})
- Time zone: UTC−06:00 (CST)
  - Summer (DST): UTC−05:00 (CDT)
- ZIP codes: 77459, 77479, 77489, 77545
- Area codes: 713, 281, 832, 346, 621
- FIPS code: 48-48804
- GNIS feature ID: 1374972
- Website: www.missouricitytx.gov

Missouri City is a city in the U.S. state of Texas, within the Houston–Pasadena–The Woodlands metropolitan area. The city is mostly in Fort Bend County, with a small portion in Harris County. As of the 2020 census, the city had a population of 74,259, an increase over the figure of 67,358 tabulated in 2010.

== History ==
The area in which Missouri City is now located holds a significant part in the history of Texas that dates back to its early days as part of the United States. In August 1853, the Buffalo Bayou, Brazos and Colorado Railway (BBB&C), began operating its first 20 miles (32 km) of rail line that stretched from Harrisburg (now Houston) to Stafford's Point (now Stafford). It was the first railroad to begin operating in Texas, and the first standard gauge railroad west of the Mississippi River.

The railway continued its extension westward until, in 1883, it linked with its eastward counterpart, completing the Sunset Route from Los Angeles to New Orleans. Today, the route of the BBB&C (now owned by the Union Pacific Railroad) is still an important and heavily operated railroad line.

In 1890, two real estate investors from Houston (R. M. Cash and L. C. Luckel) purchased 4 sq mi (10 km^{2}) of land directly on the route of the BBB&C, only a mile and a half from its first stop at Stafford's Point. They advertised the property as "a land of genial sunshine and eternal summer" in St. Louis, Missouri, and its surrounding areas. Three years later, W. R. McElroy purchased 80 acres (32 ha) in the same vicinity, and in an effort to promote the area jointly with Cash and Luckel in St. Louis, he named it "Missouri City". Its first settlers were, however, from Arlington, Texas, between Dallas and Fort Worth.

The settlement was officially registered in Texas in 1894, and began to take shape as a railroad town along Main Street and Blue Ridge Road, now known as US 90A and Texas Parkway, respectively. Its growth took an unexpected turn when, on February 14, 1895, shortly after the first group of settlers had arrived, the town was hit with a blizzard. This discouraged some of the newcomers, who gave up and moved elsewhere. Those unwavered stayed and found success in farming and ranching.

Among its first businesses were a blacksmith shop, a depot, and a general store, which also housed the first post office. The first Catholic church was built in 1913, but was destroyed by a hurricane in 1915. The new church built to replace it stood until 1990.

Oil was discovered at Blue Ridge 4 mi (6 km) southeast of town in 1919; soon after, a salt mine opened there. Missouri City became the railroad shipping point for these two resources. In 1925, at the same location, natural gas was discovered. After a pipeline had been constructed the following year, Missouri City became the first town in Fort Bend County to make use of natural gas.

With the benefit of a railroad, Missouri City had already been home to commuters who, by train, traveled to adjacent towns such as Stafford's Point and Sugar Land to work. With the increase of automobiles and the improvement of roads and highways in the early part of the 20th century, the developing community of Missouri City gradually attracted a wealth of newcomers. This gave birth to a new generation of commuters, replacing railroad commuting that eventually became obsolete. By the 1950s, the town began to take shape as a "bedroom community" suburb of Houston.

After fear and rumor spread of possible annexation of the unincorporated town by Houston, town leaders scrambled to piece together a city government. On March 13, 1956, the community that began as a small settlement more than 55 years earlier was incorporated.

Missouri City has since seen tremendous economic growth, moving eastward, southward, and then westward. The city was first made over by Fondren Park (in Harris County), near US 90A, in the early 1960s, followed by Quail Valley, along Cartwright Road between Texas Parkway and Murphy Road, in the late 1960s. Unlike neighboring Houston, Missouri City has been a zoned city since 1981. Multifamily complexes (e.g. apartments and condominiums) are a rare find because of the current zoning ordinance.

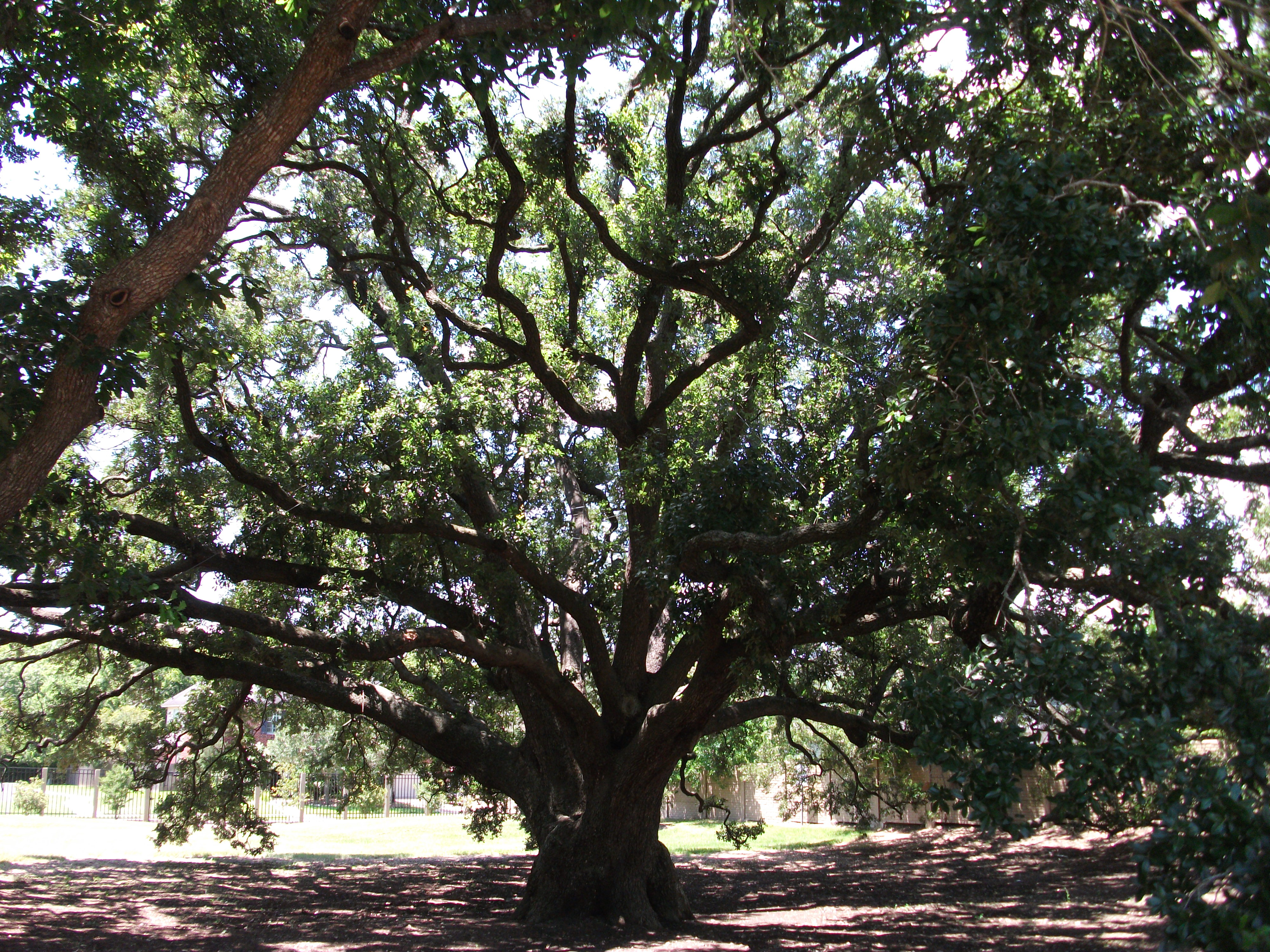
Historic Freedom Tree Park

In the 1980s, an influx of middle-class African Americans – most of them first-time homeowners – were attracted to developing communities south and west of Houston. Many of them made the subdivisions of Missouri City home. Teal Run and other unincorporated areas east of Highway 6 became ethnically diverse before neighborhoods farther west. Many of the newcomers were employees within nearby Houston work centers (e.g., Texas Medical Center and Greenway Plaza). In 2000, Missouri City was named a model city for middle-class African Americans by Black Entertainment Television.

The Missouri City area's recent upscale, master-planned residential developments include Lake Olympia, south of Quail Valley, and portions of Riverstone, south of State Highway 6. The nearby unincorporated area of Sienna Plantation, also located south of Highway 6, is situated on and around land once occupied by plantations, where among other things, sugarcane and cotton were harvested.

In 2018 Yolanda Ford became the first black mayor and first female mayor of Missouri City. In 2020, Ford lost her campaign for reelection.

== Geography ==
Missouri City is located in eastern Fort Bend County with a portion of the city extending north into Harris County. Missouri City is bordered by the city of Houston to the north and east, Stafford to the northwest, Sugar Land to the west, and Arcola to the southeast, as well as unincorporated communities such as Fifth Street to the north, Fresno to the east, and Sienna Plantation to the south. Downtown Houston is 17 mi (27 km) to the northeast. Oyster Creek flows in a southerly direction through the municipality.

According to the United States Census Bureau, Missouri City has a total area of 29.8 square miles (77.2 km^{2}), of which 28.4 square miles (73.6 km^{2}) are land and 1.4 square miles (3.6 km^{2}), or 4.65%, are covered by water.

=== Communities ===
Neighborhoods include:

- Lakes of Brightwater
- Quail Valley
- Riverstone
- Sienna Plantation
- Olympia Estates

Former communities annexed into Missouri City have included:

- DeWalt
- Trammels

== Demographics ==
Historical population
Census	Pop.	Note	%±
1960	604		—
1970	4,136		584.8%
1980	24,423		490.5%
1990	36,176		48.1%
2000	52,913		46.3%
2010	67,358		27.3%
2020	74,259		10.2%
U.S. Decennial Census

=== Racial and ethnic composition ===
Missouri City city, Texas – Racial and ethnic composition Note: the US Census treats Hispanic/Latino as an ethnic category. This table excludes Latinos from the racial categories and assigns them to a separate category. Hispanics/Latinos may be of any race.
Race / Ethnicity (NH = Non-Hispanic)	Pop 2000	Pop 2010	Pop 2020	% 2000	% 2010	% 2020
White alone (NH)	20,448	16,791	13,962	38.64%	24.93%	18.80%
Black or African American alone (NH)	20,149	27,754	30,146	38.08%	41.20%	40.60%
Native American or Alaska Native alone (NH)	83	152	95	0.16%	0.23%	0.13%
Asian alone (NH)	5,580	10,859	13,527	10.55%	16.12%	18.22%
Native Hawaiian or Pacific Islander alone (NH)	14	20	22	0.03%	0.03%	0.03%
Other race alone (NH)	108	170	353	0.20%	0.25%	0.48%
Mixed race or Multiracial (NH)	776	1,306	2,095	1.47%	1.94%	2.82%
Hispanic or Latino (any race)	5,755	10,306	14,059	10.88%	15.30%	18.93%
Total	52,913	67,358	74,259	100.00%	100.00%	100.00%

=== 2020 census ===
As of the 2020 census, Missouri City had a population of 74,259. The median age was 41.3 years, 21.7% of residents were under the age of 18, and 17.2% of residents were 65 years of age or older. For every 100 females there were 89.6 males, and for every 100 females age 18 and over there were 85.7 males age 18 and over.

There were 25,443 households and 20,099 families residing in the city; 35.2% of households had children under the age of 18 living in them, 56.0% were married-couple households, 11.9% were households with a male householder and no spouse or partner present, and 28.2% were households with a female householder and no spouse or partner present. About 18.7% of all households were made up of individuals and 8.2% had someone living alone who was 65 years of age or older.

There were 26,571 housing units, of which 4.2% were vacant; the homeowner vacancy rate was 1.7% and the rental vacancy rate was 7.1%. 99.8% of residents lived in urban areas, while 0.2% lived in rural areas.

Racial composition as of the 2020 census
Race	Number	Percent
White	16,488	22.2%
Black or African American	30,548	41.1%
American Indian and Alaska Native	398	0.5%
Asian	13,612	18.3%
Native Hawaiian and Other Pacific Islander	35	0.0%
Some other race	5,872	7.9%
Two or more races	7,306	9.8%
Hispanic or Latino (of any race)	14,059	18.9%

=== 2010 census ===
As of the 2010 census, there were 67,358 people, with 20,228 households, and 16,711 families residing in the city. The racial makeup of the city was 24.9% non-Hispanic White, 46.1% African American, 0.4% Native American, 16.2% Asian, and 2.9% from two or more races. Hispanic or Latino of any race were 15.3% of the population.

There were 20,228 households, out of which 45.7% had children under the age of 18 living with them, 61.8% were married couples living together, 16.1% had a female householder with no husband present, and 17.4% were non-families. 15.6% of all households were made up of individuals, and 4.0% had someone living alone who was 65 years of age or older. The average household size was 3.17 and the average family size was 3.54.

According to 2010 estimates, the median income for a household in the city was $81,854, and the median family income was $87,089. 38.1% of households had an income of $100,000 or more. Males had a median income of $59,157 versus $42,183 for females. The per capita income for the city was $27,210. About 9.1% of the population was below the poverty line, including 15.4% of those under age 18 and 6.5% of those age 18 or over. 41.4% of the population over the age of 25 years held a bachelor's degree or higher.

== Parks and Recreation ==
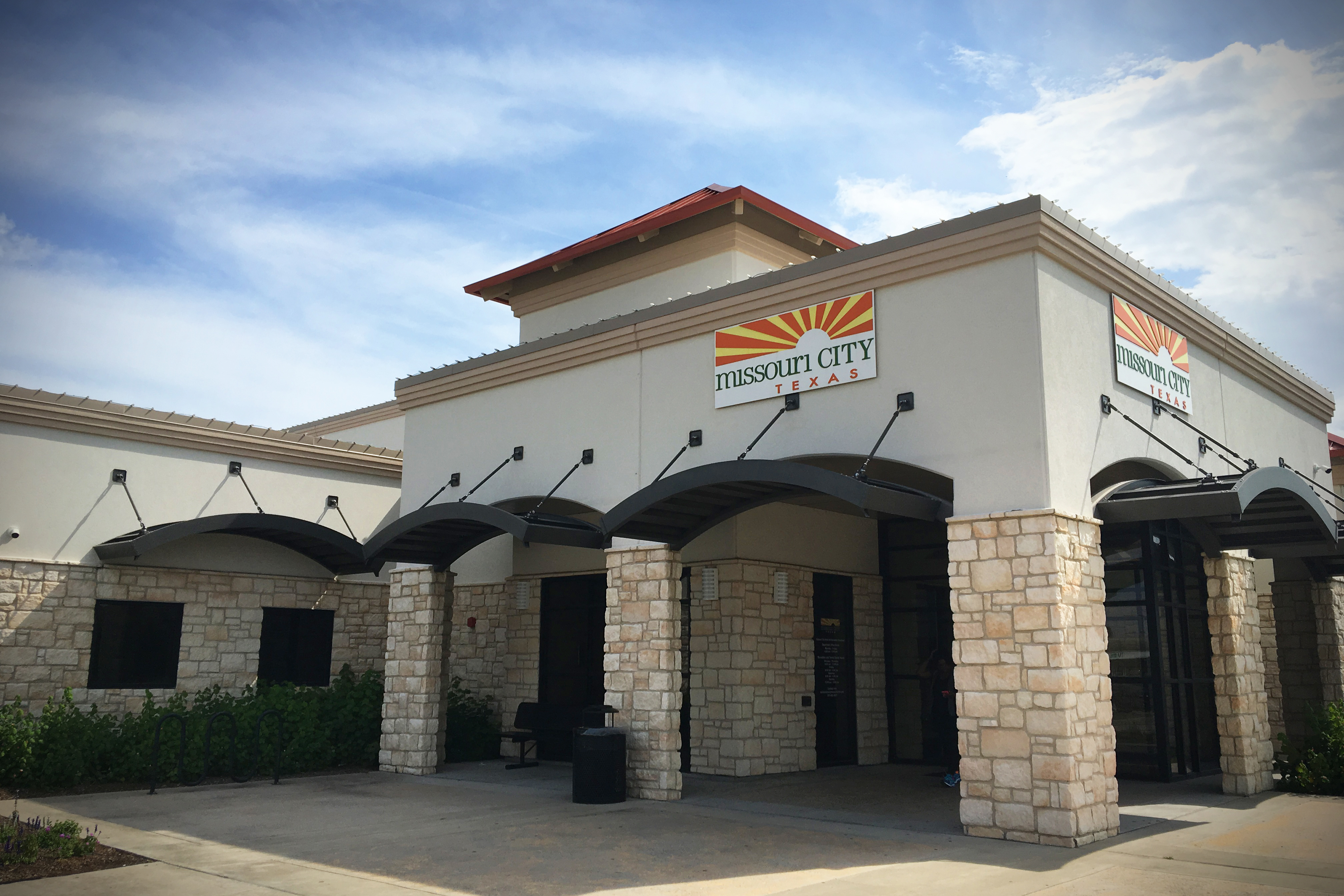
Missouri City Recreation and Tennis Center

The Missouri City Parks and Recreation Department is a nationally accredited, Texas Gold Medal Award-winning department that maintains and operates a wide variety of park and natural areas, trails, athletic complexes and other facilities. The Parks Department currently maintains 20 developed parks totaling 515 acres (208 ha), and over 14 miles of trail. Park amenities include multiple lighted sports fields, lakes, playgrounds, splash pad, and walking trails, as well as boating and fishing sites.

The Missouri City Recreation and Tennis Center is the heart of the recreation division and houses the majority of the city's recreation and fitness classes. Completed in 2012, the center features 13 tennis courts, 4 batting cages, a cardio/weight room, multi-purpose rooms, locker rooms and a full-size gymnasium. In 2022 The Recreation and Tennis Center was recognized by the United States Tennis Association (USTA), as an Outstanding Tennis Facility. Missouri City received the award in the Large (12 or more courts), Public Tennis Facility division.

The Parks and Recreation Department has daytime and evening recreational programs and provides numerous special events throughout the year.

The Missouri City Parks and Recreation Department became nationally accredited in 2021.

=== Freedom Tree Park ===
Missouri City's historic Freedom Tree Park is named after the Freedom Tree, which sits along Misty Hollow Drive between Glenn Lakes and Lake Olympia boulevards, at the former Palmer Plantation site.

=== Ridgeview Park ===
Ridgeview Park is one of the premier parks in Missouri City with a splashpad, playground, and half-mile walking tail.

== Education ==
=== Primary and secondary schools ===
==== Public schools ====
The Fort Bend County portion of Missouri City is served by Fort Bend Independent School District, while the Harris County portion is served by Houston Independent School District. The Harris County portion is within Trustee District IX, represented by Lawrence Marshall as of 2008.

===== Fort Bend Independent School District =====
FBISD formed in 1959 by the consolidation of Missouri City Independent School District and the Sugar Land Independent School District.

It operates the following schools within the Missouri City city limits:

- Elementary schools:
  - Armstrong Elementary School
  - E. A. Jones Elementary School
  - Glover Elementary School
  - Hunters Glen Elementary School
  - Lantern Lane Elementary School
  - Palmer Elementary School
  - Quail Valley Elementary School
- Middle schools:
  - Lake Olympia Middle School
  - Missouri City Middle School
  - Quail Valley Middle School
- High schools:
  - Elkins High School
  - Hightower High School
  - Thurgood Marshall High School
  - Willowridge High School

In addition to these schools, a small portion of Missouri City is also served by Dulles Middle School, First Colony Middle School, Clements High School and Dulles High School, all in Sugar Land. Some areas of Missouri City are served by other schools.

Prior to 1959 Missouri City High School, which merged into Dulles High that year, served the city. At the time of the 1959 merger, white students attended an elementary school in Missouri City, a middle school in Sugar Land, and a high school site in Missouri City. Annie Wilcox Elementary School initially occupied the former Missouri City High School building. The former combined elementary site now houses E. A. Jones Elementary School, the middle school site now houses Lakeview Elementary School, and the high school site now houses Missouri City Middle School. Dulles High became the high school for white students.

There were three schools for black students, including M.R. Wood School in Sugar Land, housing grades 1–12, and the Staffordshire School in Stafford, which houses grades 1–4, as well as a school in Arcola. There was a period where black secondary students in Missouri City were reassigned to M.R. Wood. FBISD desegregated in 1965. Dulles Junior High School served as FBISD's sole junior high school from March 1965 to August 1975, and Missouri City Junior High School opened in October 1975 on the former Missouri City High site. Dulles High became the only zoned high school for students of all races in FBISD until Willowridge High School opened in 1979. Wilcox Elementary had closed after Blue Ridge Elementary opened in August 1969.

===== Houston Independent School District =====
The Harris County portion of Missouri City is zoned to HISD schools located in the city limits of Houston:

- Kate Bell Elementary School (places south of Beltway 8)
- Jenard M. Gross Elementary School (places north of Beltway 8)
- Louie Welch Middle School
- Westbury High School

==== Private schools ====
There are 13 private primary and secondary schools in Missouri City.

Divine Savior Academy at Sienna Campus is a Christian preschool, elementary school, and middle school of the Wisconsin Evangelical Lutheran Synod in Missouri City.

=== Colleges and universities ===
The entire city is served by the Houston City College System.

=== Public libraries ===
Missouri City is served by the Missouri City Branch of the Fort Bend County Libraries system. The library, across the street from the City Hall complex and the Missouri City Civic Center, opened in June 1992. The 18,642 square feet (1,731.9 m^{2}) branch, designed by Hall/Merriman Architects, was the first of four branches built with 1989 bond funds.

== Government and infrastructure ==
On October 1, 2010, the City of Missouri City's anti-smoking law, which bans smoking in most public places, went into effect.

The United States Postal Service operates the Missouri City Post Office and the Missouri City Post Office Annex. As of 1996 some places in the city of Missouri City have Houston postal addresses, and some places in the city of Houston have Missouri City postal addresses; this is because the U.S. postal system does not base its mailing address names on municipal boundaries.

Fort Bend County does not have a hospital district. OakBend Medical Center serves as the county's charity hospital which the county contracts with. Harris Health System (formerly Harris County Hospital District), the hospital district for Harris County, designated Valbona Health Center (formerly People's Health Center) for ZIP code 77071 (Harris County Missouri City). The nearest public hospital is Ben Taub General Hospital in the Texas Medical Center.

== Transportation ==
Missouri City is crossed by US 90A, Beltway 8 (Sam Houston Tollway), Fort Bend Toll Road, State Highway 6, FM 1092 (Murphy Road), FM 2234 (Texas Parkway), and FM 3345 (Cartwright Road). Other nearby highways are Interstate 69/US 59 to the northwest and Interstate 610 (Loop 610) to the northeast.

Although Missouri City does not have public transportation within the city limits itself, it is part of the service area of METRO. METRO operates the Fondren Transit Center (formerly Missouri City Park and Ride) located on Beltway 8 and Fondren Road, which is the terminus of bus Route 63 Fondren to Sharpstown and Westheimer, bus Route 98 Briargate to Hiram Clarke Transit Center and Route 170 Missouri City Express to the Texas Medical Center (terminating at the Texas Medical Center Transit Center METRORail station there).

Discussions continue on commuter service along US 90A from METRORail's Fannin South station, initially to terminate at the Fort Bend County line near Beltway 8. Expansion westward awaits, among other things, formation of a transportation district or other funding means for communities that are not now in the METRO service area.

The US 90A/Southwest Rail Corridor project was put on hold on September 28, 2012.

== Notable people ==
- De'Von Achane (born 2001), American football running back
- Paul Begala, political commentator, was born in New Jersey, but was raised in Missouri City
- Beyoncé, singer and actress
- KaRon Coleman, gridiron football player
- Knile Davis, former NFL running back
- R'Bonney Gabriel, Miss USA 2022 and Miss Universe 2022
- Aaron Glenn, former cornerback, is currently the defensive coordinator for the Detroit Lions
- Tristan Gray, MLB infielder for the Tampa Bay Rays
- D'Angelo Harrison, shooting guard in the VTB United League and former college basketball player for St. Johns
- Nick Hernandez, MLB pitcher for the Houston Astros
- Alonzo Highsmith, former fullback, and former boxer
- Danuel House Jr., shooting guard for the Philadelphia 76ers
- Sean Jones, former Houston Oilers defensive end
- James Loney, former MLB first baseman, grew up in Missouri City and attended Elkins High School
- Bruce Matthews, NFL Hall of Famer, who formerly played with the Houston Oilers and the Tennessee Titans
- Jake Matthews, offensive tackle for the Atlanta Falcons, son of Bruce Matthews
- Adonai Mitchell, wide receiver for the Indianapolis Colts
- Logan O'Connor, Stanley Cup Champion forward for the Colorado Avalanche
- Eric Quill, soccer player and coach
- Ron Reynolds, Texas state representative from Missouri City since 2014
- Dunta Robinson, former Houston Texan and Atlanta Falcon player
- Travis Scott, rapper and producer
- Kendall Sheffield, Houston Texans cornerback
- Webster Slaughter, former wide receiver who played in the National Football League from 1986 to 1998
- Crystle Stewart, Miss Texas USA 2008, Miss USA 2008
- Z-Ro, rapper
