= Farm to Market Road 1092 =

Road in Texas, United States

Farm to Market Road 1092
- Murphy Road

Route information
- Maintained by TxDOT
- Length: 5.977 mi (9.619 km)
- Existed: December 16, 1948–present

Major junctions
- South end: SH 6 at Missouri City
- US 90 Alt. at Stafford
- North end: I-69 / US 59 in Houston

Location
- Country: United States
- State: Texas
- Counties: Fort Bend, Harris

Highway system
- Highways in Texas; Interstate; US; State; Former; Toll; Loops; Spurs; FM/RM; Park; Rec
← FM 1091	→ FM 1093

Farm to Market Road 1092 (FM 1092) is a state highway in the U.S. state of Texas that is within both Fort Bend and Harris counties. The highway starts from State Highway 6 (SH 6) in Missouri City and goes north to Interstate 69/U.S. Route 59 in southwest Houston. The divided highway is also known as Murphy Road along its entire length.

== Route description ==
FM 1092 starts at a four-way traffic signal on SH 6 in Missouri City. From the intersection, the four-lane divided highway goes a short distance to the northeast then turns directly north for almost its entire length. The extension of the road to the southwest of the SH 6 intersection is called South University Boulevard. FM 1092 crosses a bridge over Oyster Creek and continues north 1.2 miles (1.9 km) to a traffic signal at FM 3345 (Cartwright Road). From there the highway goes north past major intersections at Lexington Boulevard and Avenue E a distance of 2.5 miles (4.0 km) to the U.S. Route 90 Alternate (US 90 Alt.) overpass in Stafford. From US 90 Alt. the now six-lane divided highway continues north past intersections at Cash Road, Mula Road and West Airport Drive. Halfway between West Airport and I-69/US 59, FM 1092 crosses into Harris County. About 0.3 miles (0.5 km) before the highway ends at the I-69/US 59 Southwest Freeway overpass, FM 1092 turns to the northwest. The extension of the highway north of the Southwest Freeway is called Wilcrest Drive.

== History ==
FM 1092 was originally designated on December 16, 1948, to run from US 59 at Stafford south a distance of about 3.8 miles (6.1 km) to SH 6. At that time, the highway was entirely within Fort Bend County. On September 20, 1961, FM 1092 was extended 2.5 miles (4.0 km) from US 59 north to a proposed new US 59 (now dual signed as I-69/US 59) route known as the Southwest Freeway. The new total distance was approximately 6.3 miles (10.1 km) long. A 1955 United States Geological Survey map of Sugar Land shows that US 59 shared its right-of-way through Sugar Land and Stafford with US 90 Alt. In 2013, only US 90 Alt. used the 1955 right-of-way.

On June 27, 1995, the entire route was redesignated Urban Road 1092 (UR 1092). The designation reverted to FM 1092 with the elimination of the Urban Road system on November 15, 2018.

== Major intersections ==
County	Location	mi	km	Destinations	Notes
Fort Bend	Missouri City	0.0	0.0	SH 6	Southern terminus of FM 1092
Fort Bend	Missouri City	1.2	1.9	FM 3345	Cartwright Road
Fort Bend	Stafford	3.7	6.0	US 90 Alt.	Main Street
Harris	Houston	5.977	9.619	I-69 / US 59 – Houston, Wharton	I-69/US 59 exit 114 northbound, 115A southbound; northern terminus of FM 1092.
1.000 mi = 1.609 km; 1.000 km = 0.621 mi

== Gallery ==
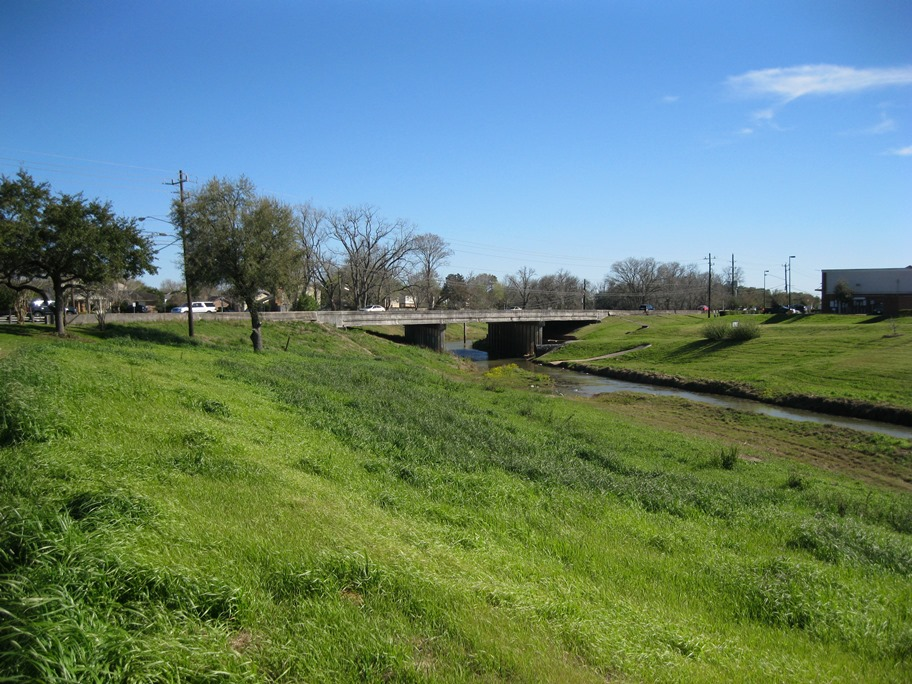
FM 1092 bridge over Oyster Creek in Missouri City

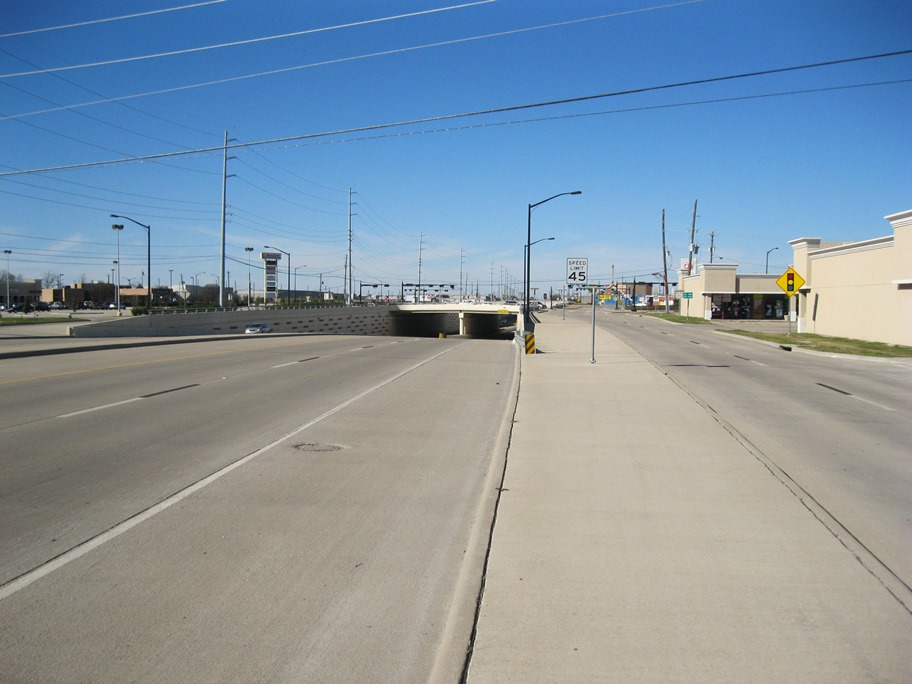
Looking north at FM 1092 underpass at US 90 Alt. in Stafford

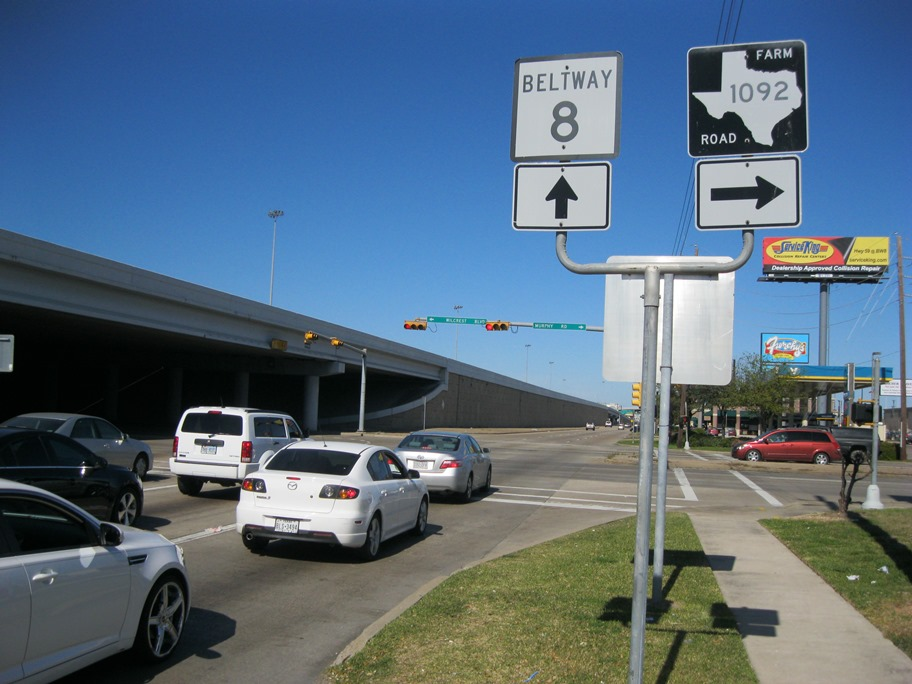
View northeast along the I-69/US 59 feeder at FM 1092 in Houston
