= Ridgeview Park (Missouri City, Texas) =

Park in Missouri City, Texas, United States

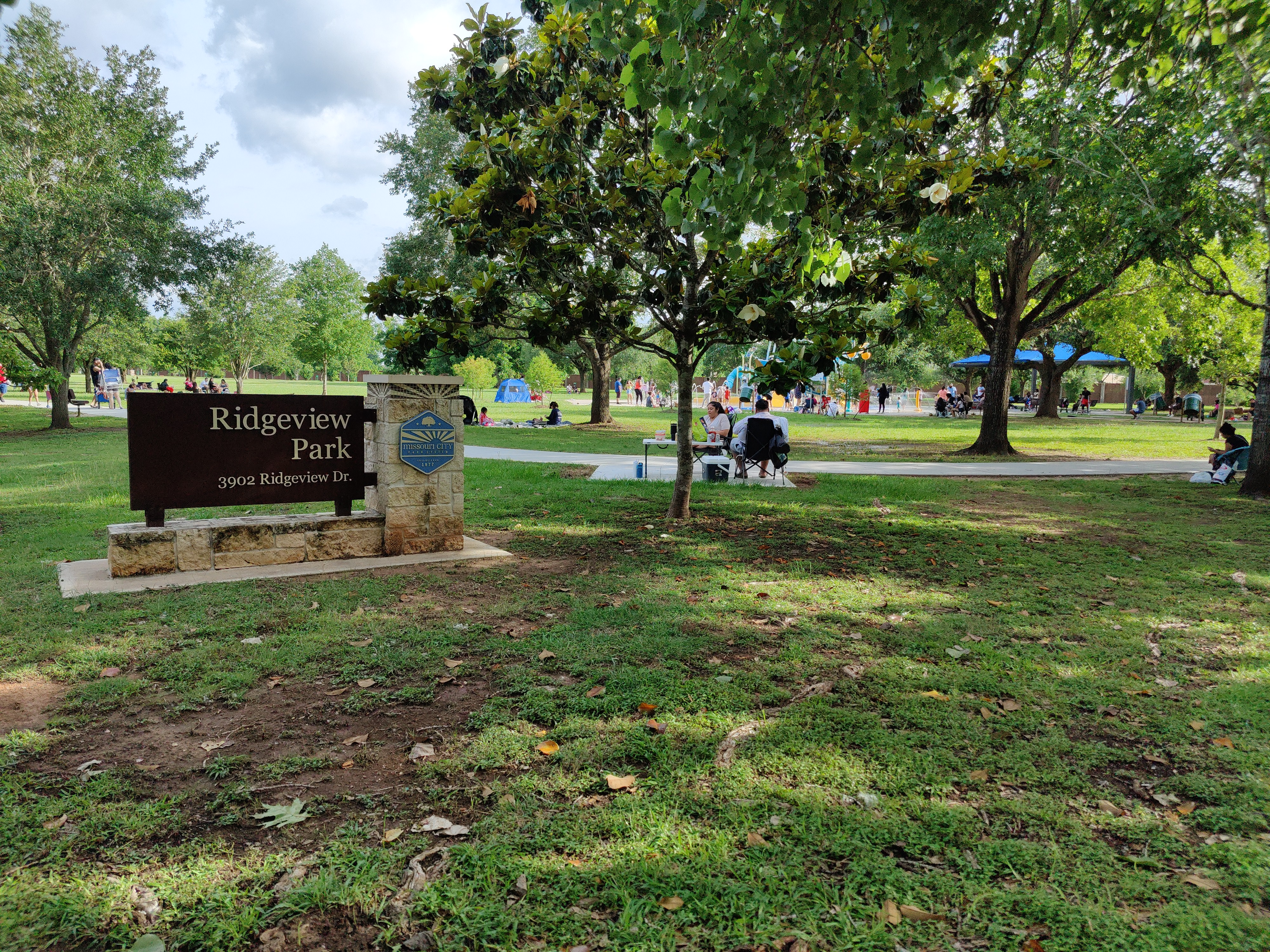
- Park entrance with street sign and splashpad in view
- Interactive map of Ridgeview Park
- Location: Missouri City, Texas
- Parking: Two parking lots available.
- Website: www.missouricitytx.gov/510/Ridgeview-Park

Ridgeview Park is a park in Missouri City with a splash pad, playground, 3 picnic pavilions, and two parking lots.

== Splash pad ==
Inside of Ridgeview Park is a large 4,460 square foot, 476 GPM splashpad that was built by Landscape Structures and completed in 2022. The shade and pumping systems were provided by Lone Star Recreation. This splash pad cost $904,000 ($1.07 million in 2025) at the time of construction with $750,000 coming from the Quail Valley Fund and $88,000 coming from Park Zone 7, leaving the city to only have to fund the remaining $66,000.

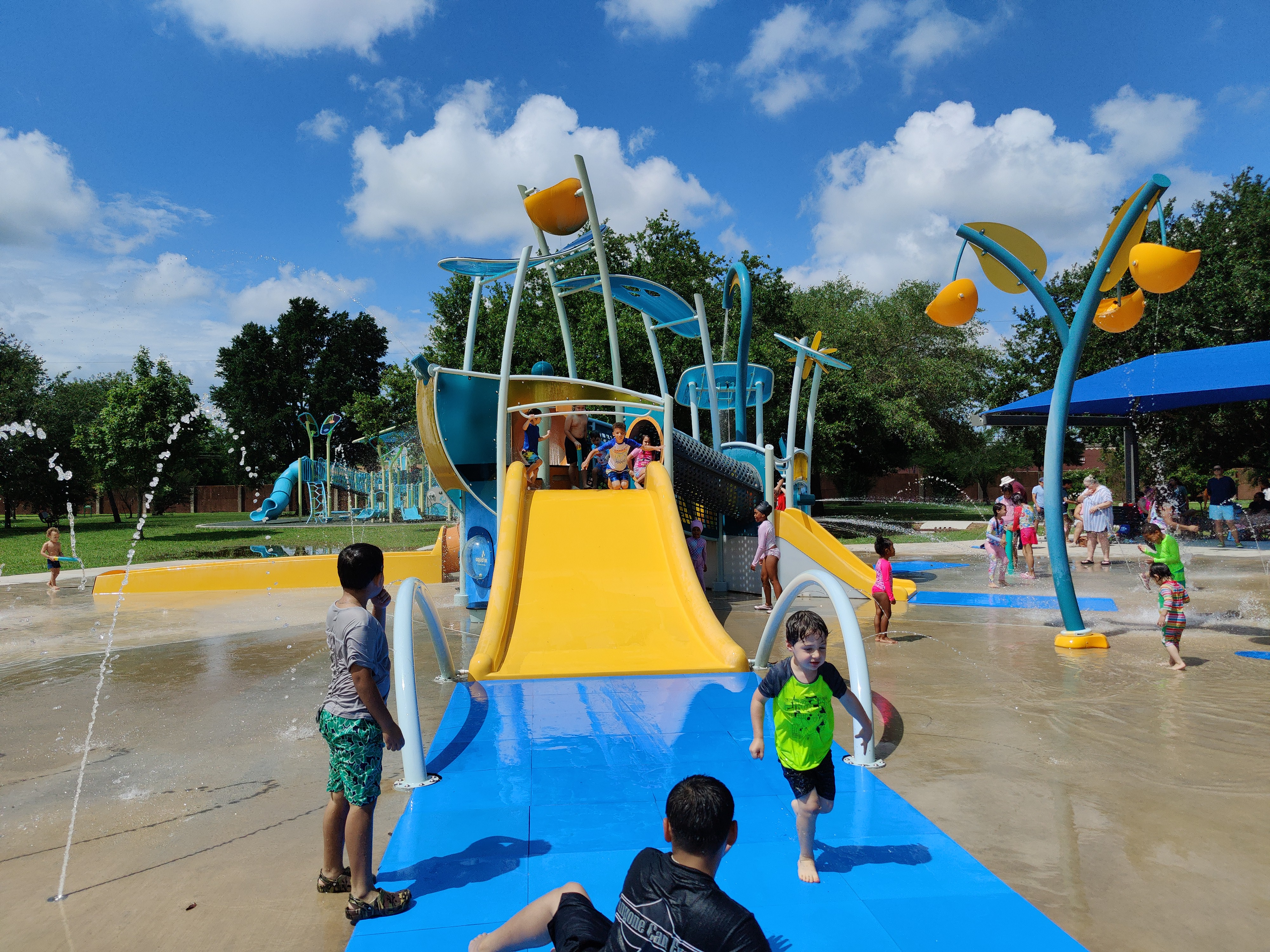
Ridgeview Park splashpad

== Playground ==
The playground in Ridgeview Park was rebuilt in 2024 after the City Council passed a bond resolution to raise $800,000 for new playground, surfacing and installation at Ridgeview Park.

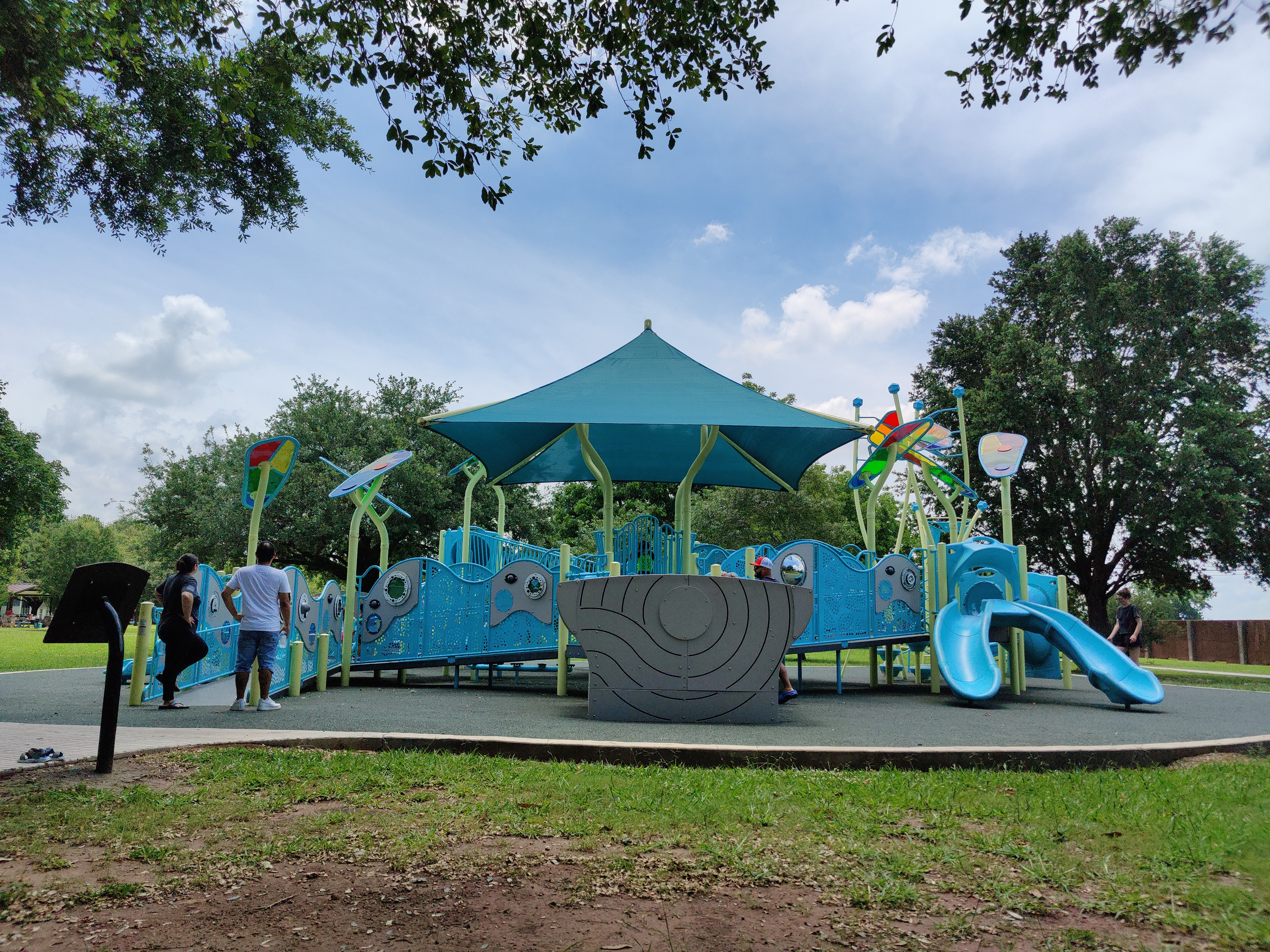
Ridgeview Park playground
