= Morgan Romano =

American beauty pageant winner (born 1998)

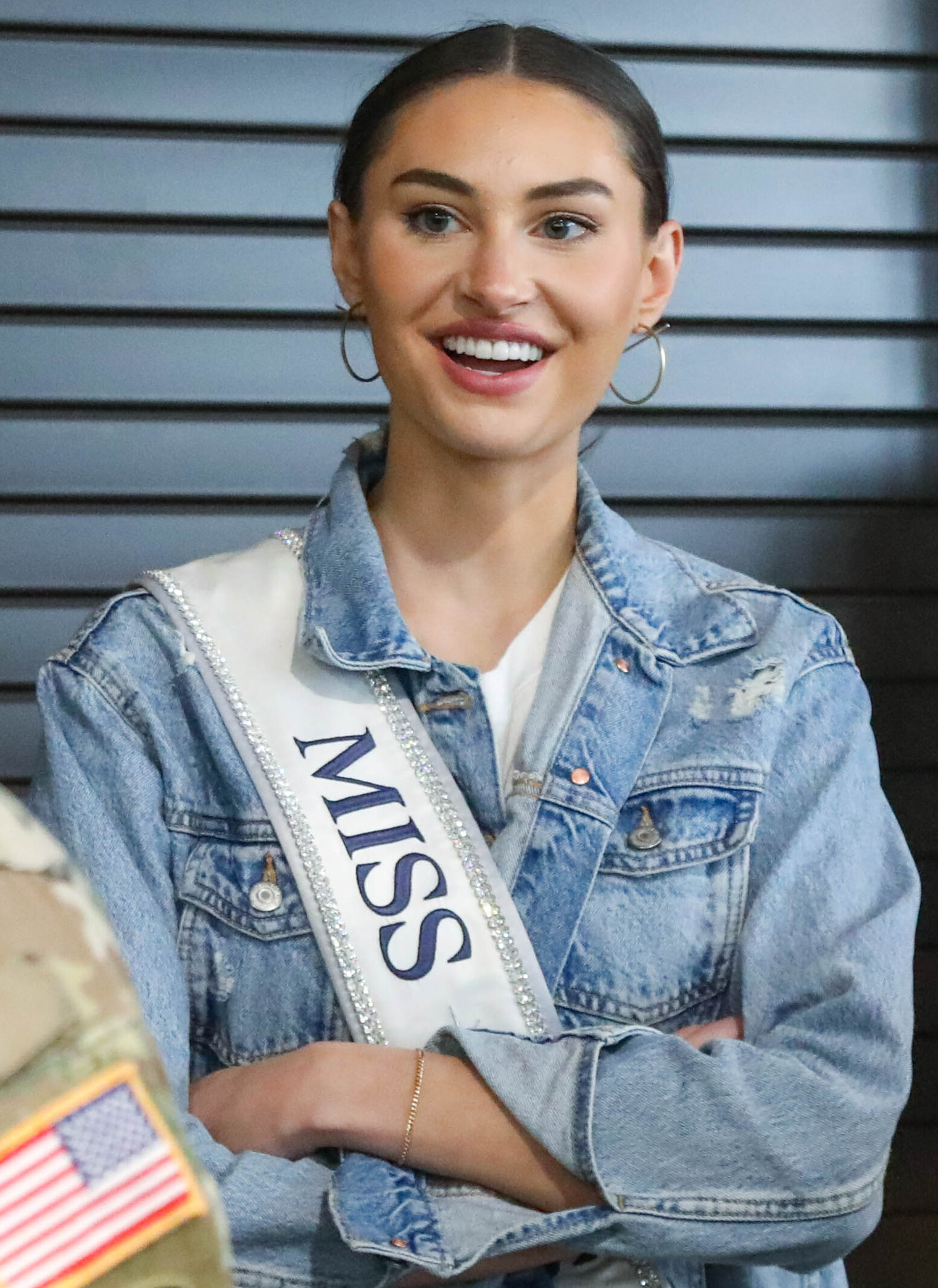
- Romano in 2023
- Born: Morgan Renee Romano; July 19, 1998 (age 28); Johnstown, New York, U.S.
- Education: University of South Carolina (BS)
- Beauty pageant titleholder
- Title: Miss North Carolina USA 2022; Miss USA 2022
- Major competitions: Miss North Carolina USA 2022; (Winner); Miss USA 2022; (1st Runner-Up) (Note: Romano was originally first runner-up, but became Miss USA after the original titleholder, R'Bonney Gabriel, won Miss Universe. Due to pageant protocol, Miss USA must relinquish her title in the event she wins Miss Universe.)

Morgan Renee Romano (born July 19, 1998) is an American beauty pageant titleholder who was crowned Miss USA 2022, after its original winner R'Bonney Gabriel won Miss Universe 2022. She is the fourth woman from North Carolina to be crowned Miss USA. She also won Miss North Carolina USA 2022, and was first runner-up at Miss USA.

== Early life and education ==
Romano was born on July 19, 1998, in Johnstown, New York. She is a graduate of Johnstown High School. After completing high school, Romano moved to Columbia, South Carolina, to enroll in the University of South Carolina, graduating with a degree in chemical engineering in 2020. Romano had decided to relocate to the southern United States due to her dislike for the harsh winter weather in Upstate New York. Following her graduation, Romano relocated to Concord, North Carolina, where she began working as an application engineer for industrial equipment supplier RE Mason.

== Pageantry ==
At the encouragement of her mother, Romano began competing in pageantry as a teenager, and was a runner-up at Miss New York's Outstanding Teen when she was in high school. After relocating to South Carolina in 2016, Romano decided to return to pageantry, due to her desire to make more female friends as a female student in a male-dominated field. She later won the title of Miss Midlands, and competed at Miss South Carolina three times and Miss South Carolina USA once, without winning a title.

Romano began competing in North Carolina pageantry after relocating there in 2020, and was the second runner-up at Miss North Carolina USA 2021. Romano returned the following year and won Miss North Carolina USA 2022, on January 29, 2022. Romano later crowned Jordyn McKey as her successor at Miss North Carolina USA 2023 on February 25, 2023.

=== Miss USA 2022 ===
As Miss North Carolina USA, Romano entered Miss USA 2022. The competition was held on October 3, 2022, in Reno, Nevada. Romano was first runner-up, behind winner Miss Texas USA, R'Bonney Gabriel. During the competition, Romano promoted women in STEM fields.

Due to pageant protocol, Gabriel was unable to continue her reign as Miss USA after winning Miss Universe 2022 in January 2023, and the Miss USA title was passed on to Romano. During her reign as Miss USA, Romano has worked with the nonprofits Project Scientist and Smile Train.

== Notes ==
Awards and achievements
Preceded by R'Bonney Gabriel, Texas	Miss USA; 2022	Succeeded by Noelia Voigt, Utah
Preceded by Madison Bryant	Miss North Carolina USA; 2022	Succeeded by Jordyn McKey
