= KaRon Coleman =

American football player (born 1978)

No. 46, 21, 34
- Position: Running back

Personal information
- Born: May 22, 1978 (age 48); Missouri City, Texas, U.S.
- Listed height: 5 ft 7 in (1.70 m)
- Listed weight: 198 lb (90 kg)

Career information
- High school: Elkins (Missouri City)
- College: Stephen F. Austin (1996–1999)
- NFL draft: 2000: undrafted

Career history
- Denver Broncos (2000–2002); Houston Texans (2004)*; Ottawa Renegades (2005)
- * Offseason or practice squad member only

Career NFL statistics
- Rushing attempts: 58
- Rushing yards: 200
- Touchdowns: 1
- Stats at Pro Football Reference

KaRon Rashad Coleman (born May 22, 1978) is an American former professional football player who was a running back for three seasons with the Denver Broncos of the National Football League (NFL). He played college football for the Stephen F. Austin Lumberjacks. He also played for the Ottawa Renegades of the Canadian Football League (CFL).

== Early life and college ==
KaRon Rashad Coleman was born on May 22, 1978, in Missouri City, Texas. He attended Elkins High School in Missouri City.

Coleman was a four-year letterman for the Lumberjacks of Stephen F. Austin State University from 1996 to 1999.

== Professional career ==
=== Denver Broncos ===
Coleman signed with the Denver Broncos on April 17, 2000, after going undrafted in the 2000 NFL draft. He was released on August 27, signed to the practice squad the next day, promoted to the active roster on September 9, released again on September 12, re-signed to the practice squad again the next day, and promoted to the active roster again on October 4. Overall, he played in nine games for the Broncos during the 2000 season, rushing 54 times for 183 yards and one touchdown while also catching one pass for five yards on three targets. Coleman also appeared in one playoff game that year but did not record any statistics.

Coleman was released by the Broncos on September 2, 2001, but later re-signed on November 26, 2001. He played in four games in 2001, recording four carries for 17 yards, and six receptions for 45 yards on 11 targets. He played in two games for the Broncos during the 2002 season. Coleman was released on July 30, 2003, after failing a physical.

=== Houston Texans ===
Coleman signed with the Houston Texans on August 16, 2004. He was released by the Texans on August 30, 2004.

=== Ottawa Renegades ===
Coleman dressed in nine games for the Ottawa Renegades of the Canadian Football League in 2005, totaling six rushing attempts for 15 yards and one touchdown, five catches for 40 yards on five targets, four kickoff returns for 72 yards, and three punt returns for 32 yards.

== Personal life ==
Coleman graduated from Southwestern Baptist Theological Seminary. He became a church planter after his football career. In 2011, he released a book titled Don't Count Me Out: When Something Little Becomes Big.

Coleman's father, Ronnie Coleman, also played in the NFL.
