= Micah Jesse =

American gossip blogger

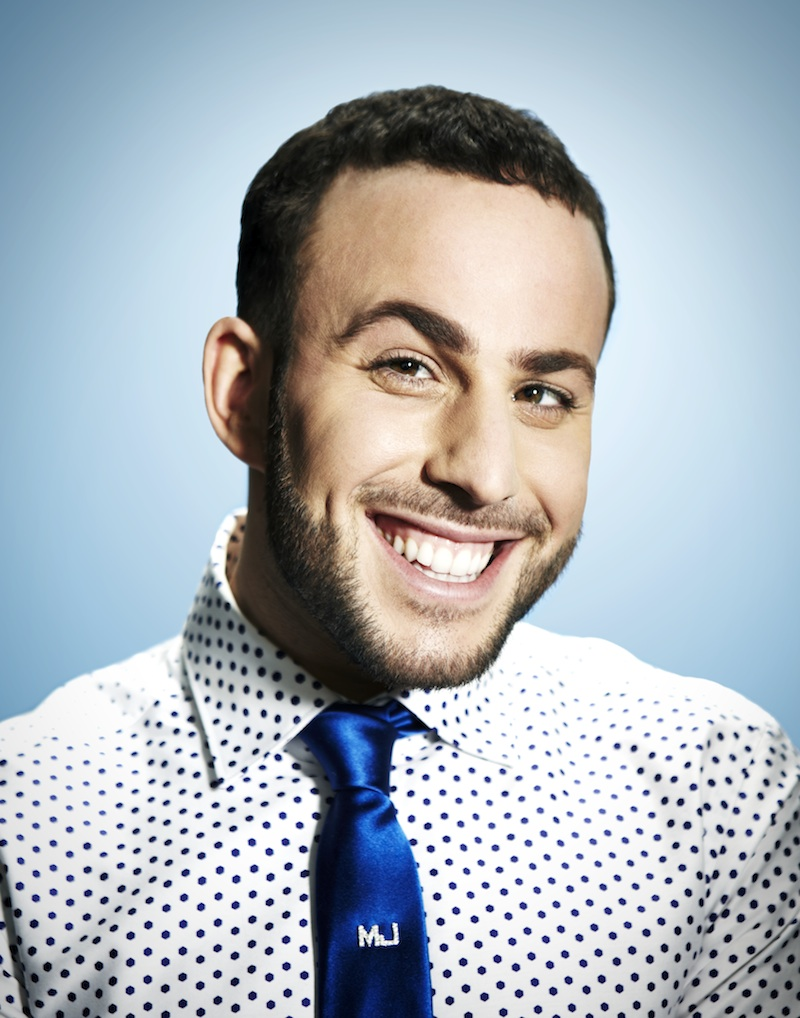
- Born: Micah Jesse Koffler; July 19, 1986 (age 40); Atlanta, Georgia, U.S.
- Education: Hofstra University (BA)
- Years active: 2007–present
- Known for: Gossip columnist, Glitterati
- Height: 6 ft 2 in (1.88 m)
- Website: www.micahjesse.com

Micah Jesse Koffler (born July 19, 1986), better known as Micah Jesse is an American gossip blogger and creator of the lifestyle and entertainment website MicahJesse.com.

== Early life ==
Jesse was born in Atlanta, Georgia to parents from Philadelphia and Pittsburgh. His father, Barry A. Koffler, is an orthopedic surgeon, and mother, Marcie Koffler, is an artist.

On May 17, 2009, he received his BA in public relations from Long Island's Hofstra University. then moved to New York, New York, where he currently resides.

== Career ==
In May 2012, Jesse became the entertainment correspondent for the WWE and Creative Coalition's Be A STAR Alliance, which promotes anti-bullying initiatives.

=== MicahJesse.com ===
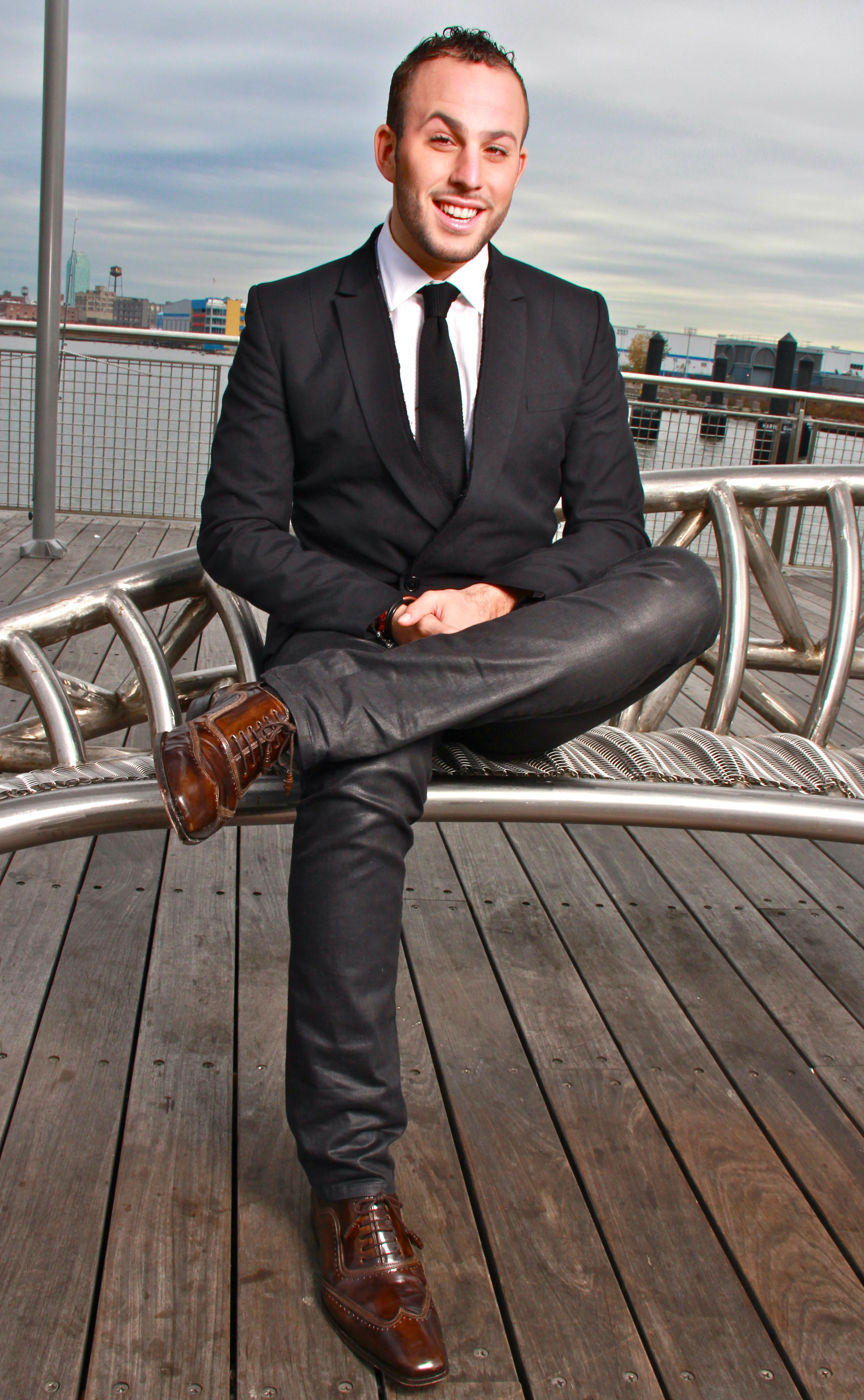
Micah Jesse in 2011

The lifestyle and entertainment website focuses on celebrities, as well as Jesse's own activities.

He was once dubbed "the Perez Hilton of the East Coast" by OK! magazine;

In January 2012, Jesse was a judge at the Miss New York USA pageant, helping to select the 2012 representative for the state of New York in the Miss USA pageant.

=== Television ===
In June 2009, Jesse became a co-host on Music Choice channel on the network's on-demand show Certified. He signed on for another year at the network in April 2011, and hosted his own red carpet segment called "Plus 1" on the network's show Speaking Of.... "Plus 1" featured Micah interviewing celebrities on the red carpet at events such as the Z100 Jingle Ball, Out Magazine OUT100 Awards, and the Tribeca Film Festival. In January 2013, Micah returned to Music Choice to host the talk show U&A Live. Jesse became a correspondent on entertainment and pop culture show AXSLive on AXS TV, in September 2012. In September 2009, Jesse became a weekly entertainment contributor on the WNYW-TV (FOX 5) show Good Day New York Online.

=== Radio ===
Jesse launched an online radio show, The Micah Jesse Show, on January 20, 2009, which included updates from his blog and interviews with celebrities.

In January 2013, Micah became a weekly entertainment and celebrity gossip contributor on Long Island, New York radio station 106.1 FM WBLI on the "Dana & Jeffrey in the Morning" radio show.
