= R'Bonney Gabriel =

American fashion designer & beauty pageant titleholder (born 1994)

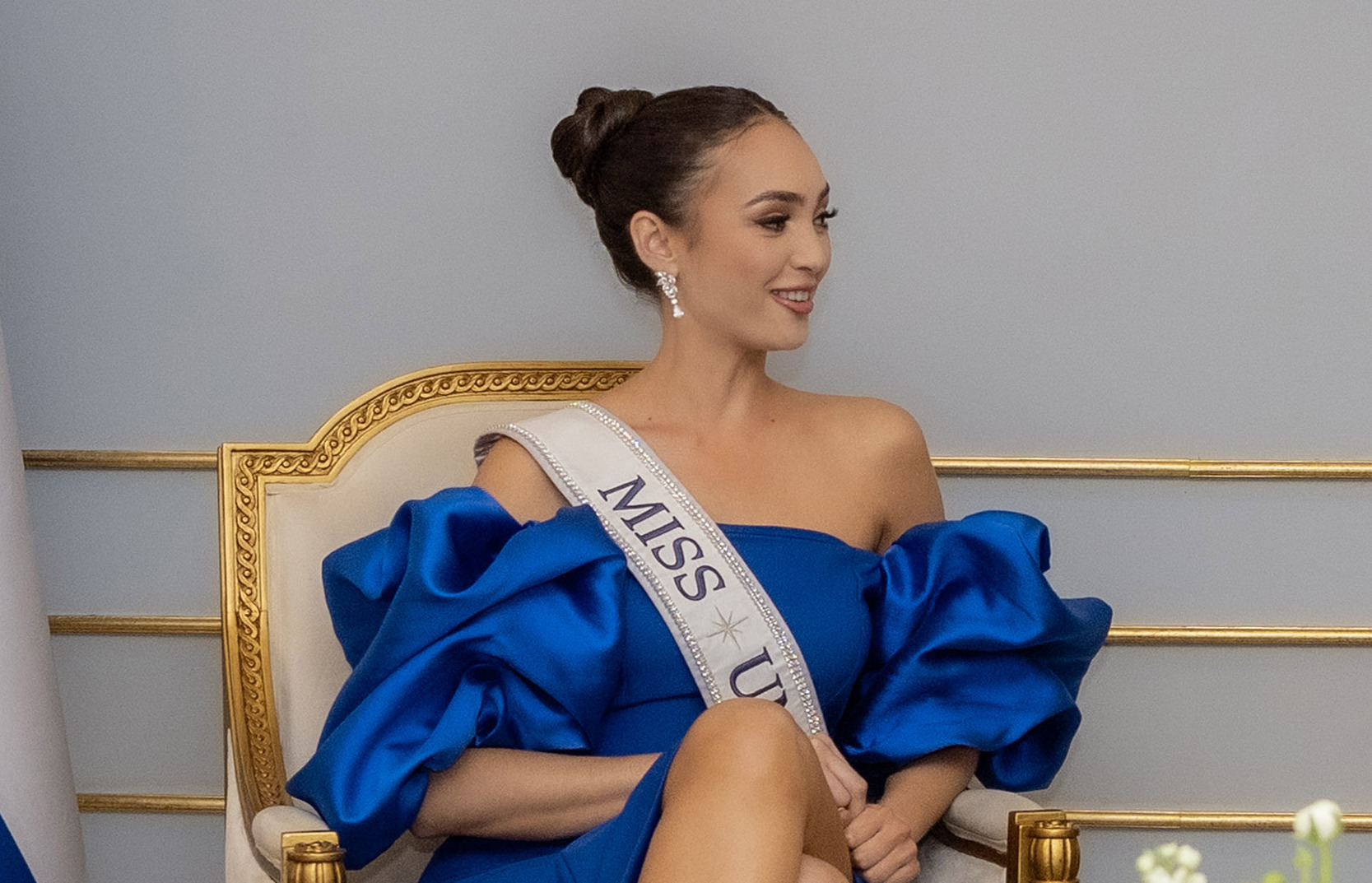
- Gabriel in 2023
- Born: R'Bonney Nola Gabriel; March 20, 1994 (age 32); Houston, Texas, U.S.
- Education: University of North Texas (BFA)
- Occupations: Fashion designer; model
- Height: 1.70 m (5 ft 7 in)
- Beauty pageant titleholder
- Title: Miss Texas USA 2022; Miss USA 2022; Miss Universe 2022
- Hair color: Brown
- Eye color: Hazel
- Major competitions: Miss Texas USA 2021; (1st Runner-Up); Miss Texas USA 2022; (Winner); Miss USA 2022; (Winner); Miss Universe 2022; (Winner)
- Website: rbonneynola.com

R'Bonney Nola Gabriel (born March 20, 1994) is an American fashion designer, model, host and beauty queen best known for winning the title of Miss Universe 2022. Gabriel won the Miss Texas USA 2022 and Miss USA 2022 titles, becoming the ninth competitor from the United States to win the Miss Universe title, as well as the oldest entrant. In 2026, she competed on season 22 of Project Runway. She graduated from the University of North Texas with a bachelor's degree in fashion design and works as a designer creating eco-friendly clothing.

== Early life and education ==
R'Bonney Nola Gabriel was born in Houston, Texas, to a Filipino father, Remigio Bonzon "R. Bon" Gabriel, and an American mother, Dana Walker, who were married in the Philippines. She grew up in Missouri City and later in Friendswood, with three older brothers. Her father was born in the Philippines and is from Malate, Manila. He immigrated to Washington at the age of 25, later receiving a degree in psychology at the University of Houston, and then opening a car repair shop. Her mother is from Beaumont. Gabriel spent some time in Manila during her childhood playing in the streets, playing tong-its, and watching the parade of Filipino fiestas. She and her family have continued to visit the Philippines during holidays and summer vacations, going back and living in Malate, on the same street where her father is from.

Gabriel graduated from the University of North Texas in 2018 with a bachelor's degree in fashion design with a minor in fibers. She works as a designer creating eco-friendly clothing, and as a model. She has worked as a sewing instructor at a non-profit organization.

== Pageantry ==
Gabriel's first pageant was Miss Kemah USA 2020, where she reached the top five finalists. She competed at Miss Texas USA 2021 as Miss Harris County and was the first runner-up to Victoria Hinojosa of McAllen.

=== Miss USA 2022 ===
Having won Miss Texas USA 2022, she went on to win Miss USA 2022, becoming the first Miss USA of Filipino descent. Gabriel became the second titleholder from Texas, after Chelsi Smith, to win the Miss Universe title.

After the event, allegations emerged that the competition had been rigged for Gabriel to win. It was claimed that Gabriel traveled to Nizuc Resort and Spa in Cancún weeks after Gabriel was crowned Miss Texas USA and was able to shoot promotional material, which the resort's Instagram account posted less than 24 hours after the final competition. Nizuc has become one of the pageant's sponsors since national director and Miss USA 2008 Crystle Stewart took over at the end of 2020 after Miss USA and Miss Teen USA were separated from the Miss Universe Organization until her suspension. Both Gabriel and Miss Colorado USA Alexis Glover were not included in the official Cancún retreat along with the rest of the contestants as Texas and Colorado had not yet crowned at the time of the retreat. In an interview with E! News, Gabriel refuted claims that the pageant was rigged. She stated, "I would never enter any pageant or any competition that I know I would win".

=== Miss Universe 2022 ===
As Miss USA 2022, she represented the United States at the Miss Universe 2022 pageant on January 14, 2023, at the New Orleans Morial Convention Center in New Orleans, Louisiana, after being postponed from late 2022 to January 2023 due to the 2022 FIFA World Cup. Her national costume was based on the 1969 U.S. moon landing

She was crowned Miss Universe 2022 by the outgoing titleholder Harnaaz Sandhu of India, making her the ninth American to win the beauty pageant. She is also the sixth mixed-heritage woman to win the Miss Universe title after Chelsi Smith at Miss Universe 1995, Brook Lee at Miss Universe 1997, Pia Wurtzbach at Miss Universe 2015, Demi-Leigh Tebow at Miss Universe 2017, and Catriona Gray at Miss Universe 2018. She is the fifth Miss Universe of Filipino descent and the first Filipina to win Miss Universe outside the Philippines. Her victory also made her the first representative from the United States to win Miss Universe since Olivia Culpo at Miss Universe 2012. She is also the first Miss Universe titleholder to be born and raised in the Greater Houston area. Additionally, she is the second Asian American woman to win the Miss Universe title since Brook Lee at Miss Universe 1997, and also the oldest winner at 28 years old, succeeding Andrea Meza of Mexico.

In her capacity as Miss Universe, Gabriel traveled to Indonesia, Thailand, Malaysia, Vietnam, the Philippines, Guatemala, the Netherlands, South Africa, Honduras, Belize, Mexico, France, El Salvador, and her home country, the United States.

On November 18, 2023, Gabriel crowned Sheynnis Palacios of Nicaragua as her successor at Miss Universe 2023 at the José Adolfo Pineda Arena, San Salvador, El Salvador.

Awards and achievements
Preceded by Harnaaz Sandhu	Miss Universe; 2022	Succeeded by Sheynnis Palacios
Preceded by Kentucky, Elle Smith	Miss USA; 2022	Succeeded by North Carolina, Morgan Romano
Preceded by Victoria Hinojosa	Miss Texas USA; 2022	Succeeded by Allison Drake
