= Miss USA 2022 =

71st edition of the Miss USA competition

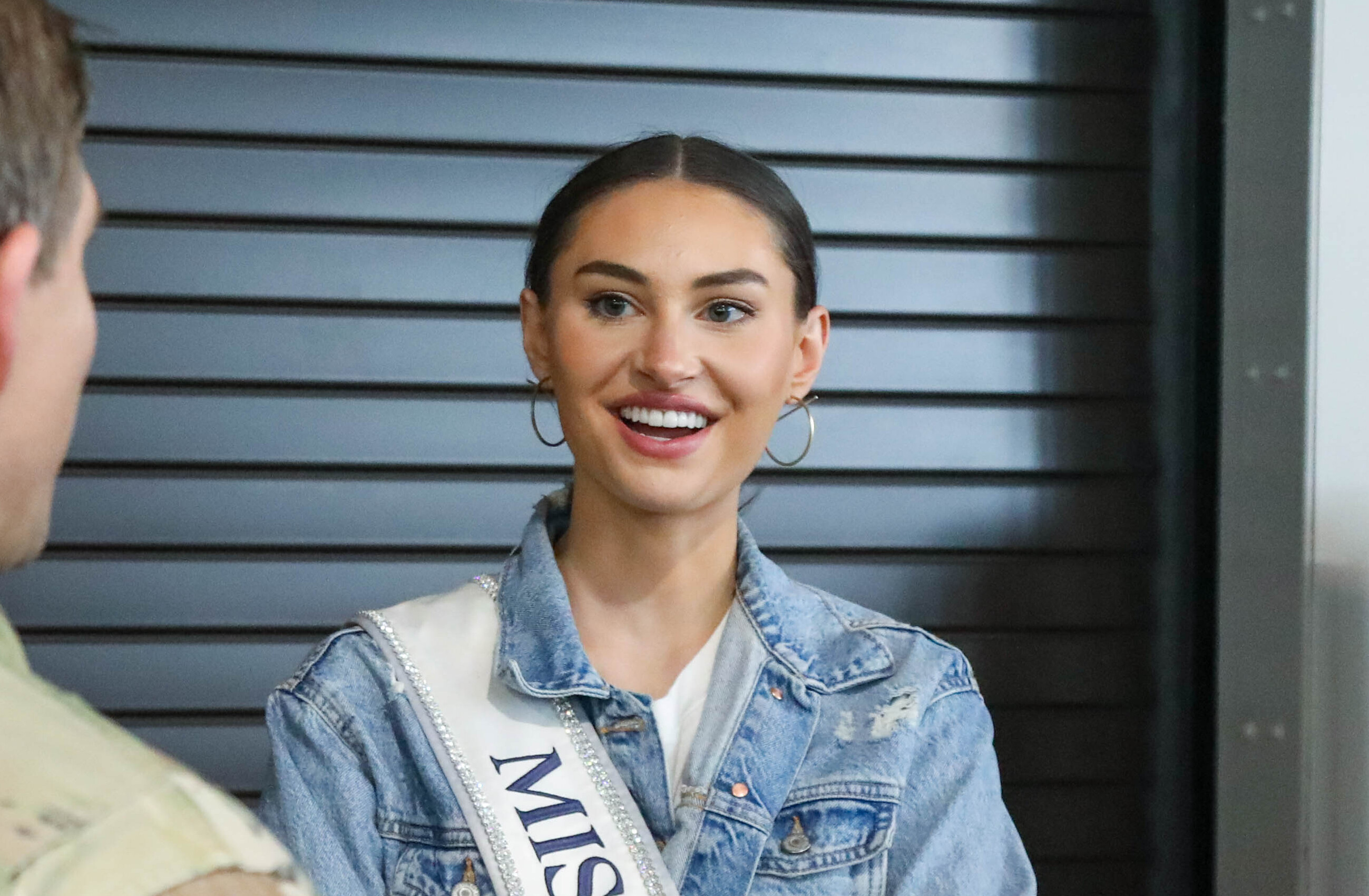
- Morgan Romano
- Date: October 3, 2022
- Presenters: Zuri Hall; Julissa Bermudez; Micah Jesse
- Entertainment: Chloe Flower
- Venue: Grand Sierra Resort, Reno, Nevada
- Broadcaster: FYI
- Entrants: 51
- Placements: 16
- Winner: R'Bonney Gabriel (Texas) (Relinquished); Morgan Romano (North Carolina)(Succeeded)
- Congeniality: Courtney Schuman (Alaska)
- Best State Costume: R'Bonney Gabriel (Texas)
- Photogenic: Angel Reyes (Illinois)

Miss USA 2022 was the 71st Miss USA pageant, held at the Grand Sierra Resort in Reno, Nevada on 3 October 2022.

At the end of the event, Elle Smith of Kentucky crowned R'Bonney Gabriel of Texas as Miss USA 2022. This was Texas' tenth Miss USA title and first win in 14 years. At the age of 28 years, 6 months and 13 days, Gabriel became the oldest Miss USA winner in the pageant's history, surpassing Cheslie Kryst in 2019, who was also 28 when she crowned, and the first titleholder of Filipino descent.

Gabriel went on to win Miss Universe in New Orleans, becoming the ninth American woman to do so. With the win, her title was rescinded, and the first runner-up, Morgan Romano of North Carolina, assumed the Miss USA title on January 27, 2023 in a ceremony in Auburn, Alabama. Romano became the fourth woman from North Carolina to hold the Miss USA title.

The competition was hosted by Zuri Hall for the second consecutive year, while Julissa Bermudez and Micah Jesse served as sideline correspondents. This competition was broadcast on the FYI cable channel. American musician Chloe Flower performed in this edition.

== Background ==
=== Location, hosts, and performer ===
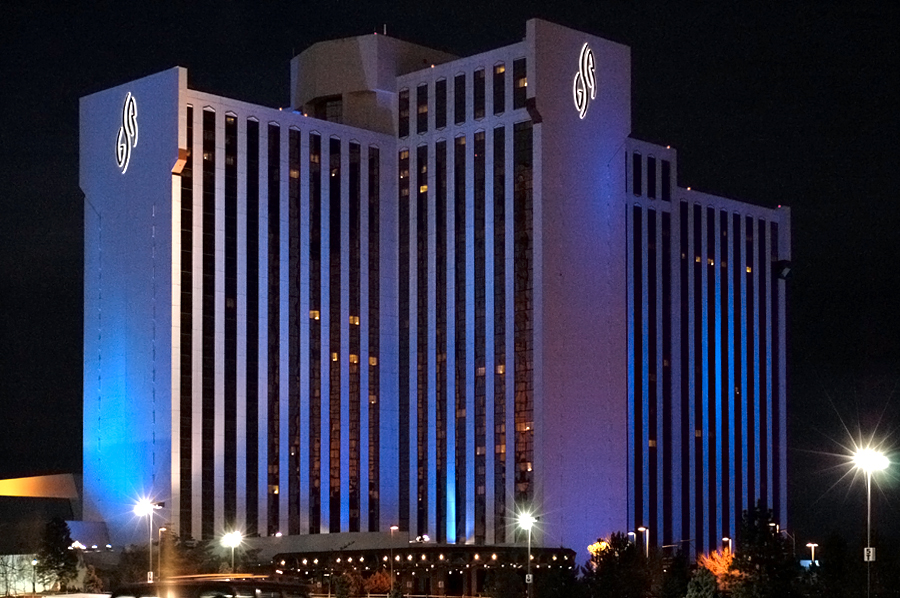
Grand Sierra Resort in Reno, Nevada, the host venue of Miss USA 2022

On 14 July 2022, it was reported that the competition would be held in Reno, Nevada, with the city securing a three-year deal to host the pageant. This would be the second time that the pageant is held in Reno, following Miss USA 2019. The following day, it was confirmed that the pageant would be held at the Grand Sierra Resort on October 3. National Director Crystle Stewart confirmed that the location was chosen to honor Cheslie Kryst, whom had been crowned Miss USA 2019 in the same venue and had died by suicide in January 2022.

=== Selection of contestants ===
The COVID-19 pandemic impacted the duration between most of the state pageants from Miss USA 2021. The previous year's state titleholders' reign was shortened to between eight and eleven months, depending on the state. Delegates from the 50 states and the District of Columbia are selected in state pageants in a period began in September 2021 and scheduled to end in July 2022 to avoid scheduling conflicts with Miss America 2023 state pageants. The state pageant schedule can become very busy between the last state pageant held from 2021. The first state pageants were Miss Idaho USA and Miss Montana USA, held together on September 12, 2021, and the last state pageant was Miss Colorado USA, held on July 3, 2022.

Eleven delegates have previously competed in Miss Teen USA and Miss America, eight are former Miss Teen USA state winners, two are a former Miss America state titleholders, and one is a former Miss America's Outstanding Teen state titleholder.

=== Controversy ===
In 2020, Crystle Stewart, who had previously won the Miss USA 2008 competition while representing Texas, became the National Director of the Miss USA pageant. In September 2022, prior to the national competition, state officials had expressed concern that Stewart, as the most recent Miss Texas USA winner to win the national-level competition, was providing preferential treatment to the 2022 Miss Texas USA winner, R'Bonney Gabriel. Less than 24 hours after Gabriel ultimately won the October 2022 competition, pageant sponsor Nizuc Resort and Spa posted videos on Instagram showing Gabriel at their resort in Cancún, Mexico. While the state-level winners had visited the resort prior to the national competition, Gabriel and Miss Colorado USA Alexis Glover did not attend this retreat because their respective state competitions occurred afterward. Citing the promotional footage, Miss Montana USA Heather Lee O'Keefe and Miss Georgia USA Holly Haynes alleged that Gabriel had been rigged to win the competition, but the Miss USA organization claimed that Gabriel had immediately flown from the pageant venue to the resort after winning the competition. In an interview with E! News, Gabriel denied claims that the pageant was rigged, stating "I would never enter any pageant or any competition that I know I would win."

== Results ==
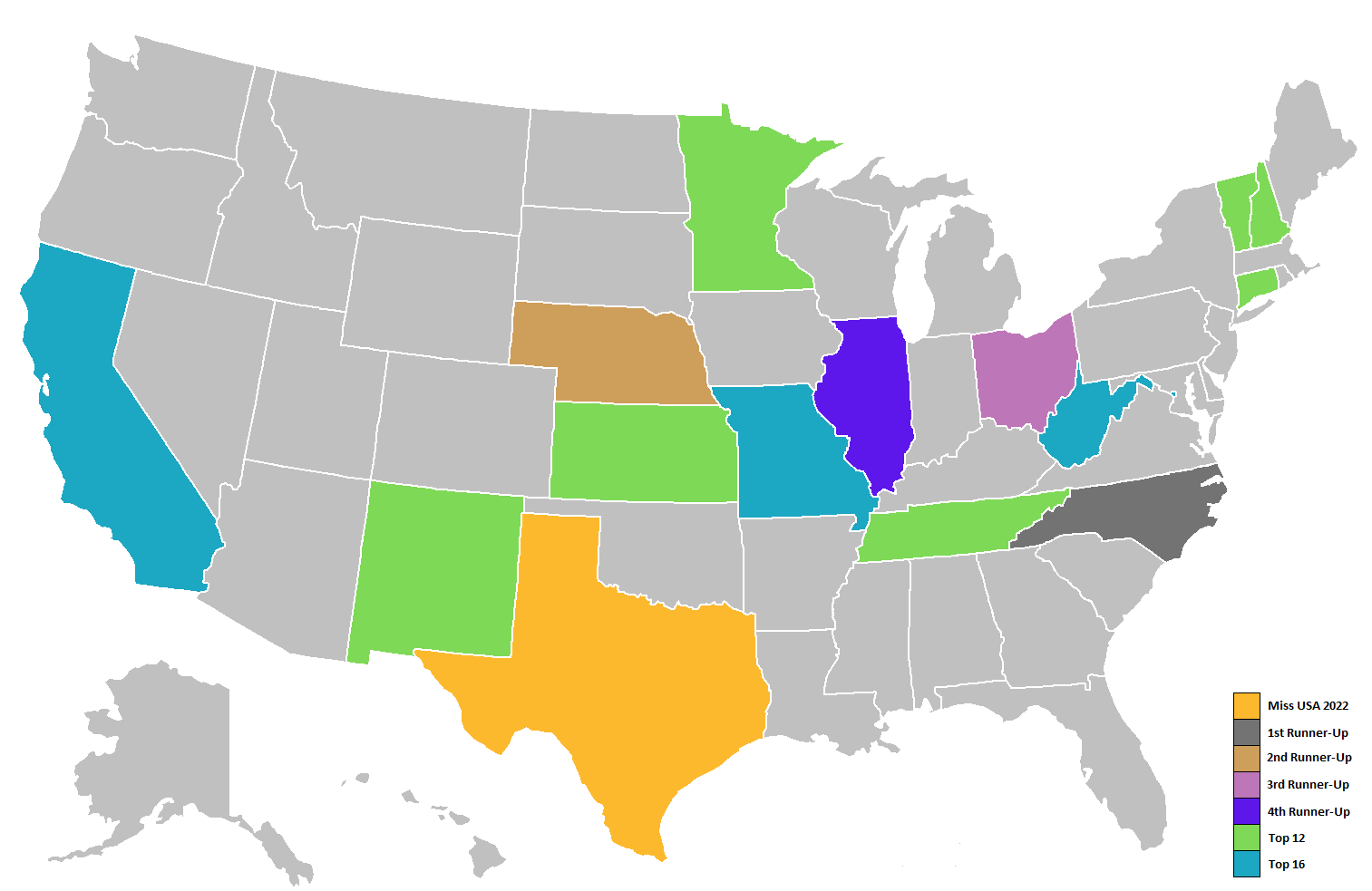
Miss USA 2022 results map, colors shaded in each state

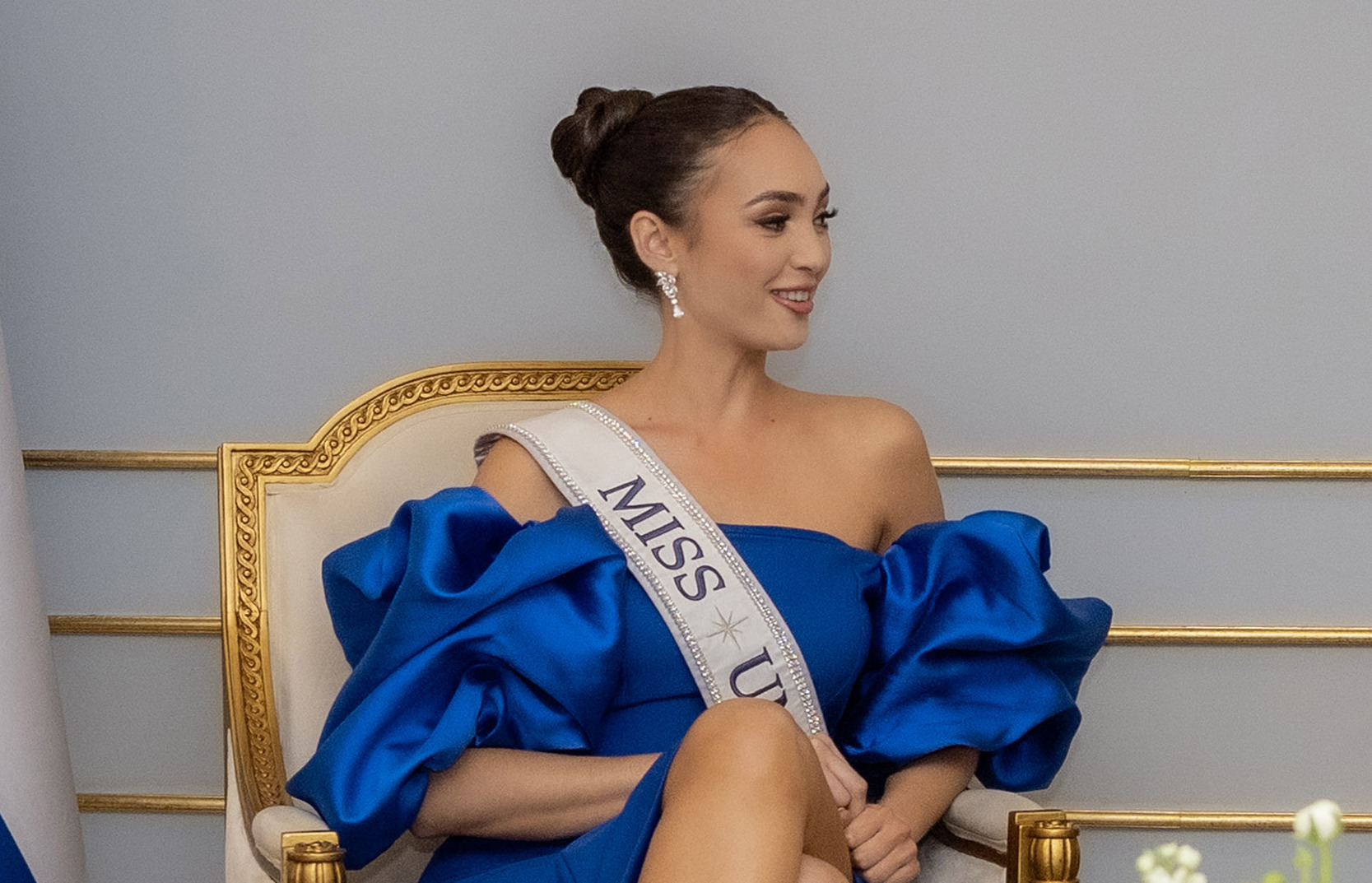
R'Bonney Gabriel, who rescinded as Miss USA after winning Miss Universe

=== Placements ===
Placement	Contestant
Miss USA 2022	Texas – R'Bonney Gabriel
1st Runner-Up	North Carolina – Morgan Romano ‡
2nd Runner-Up	Nebraska – Natalie Pieper
3rd Runner-Up	Ohio – Sir'Quora Carroll
4th Runner-Up	Illinois – Angel Reyes
Top 12	Connecticut – Cynthia Dias †; Kansas – Elyse Noe; Minnesota – Madeline Helget; New Hampshire – Camila Sacco; New Mexico – Suzanne Perez; Tennessee – Emily Suttle; Vermont – Kelsey Golonka
Top 16	California – Tiffany Johnson; District of Columbia – Faith Porter; Missouri – Mikala McGhee; West Virginia – Krystian Leonard

† – Voted into the Top 16 by viewers .
‡ – Gabriel won Miss Universe 2022. Due to protocol, Gabriel relinquished her title and the 1st runner-up, Morgan Romano, assumed the Miss USA title.

=== Special awards ===
Award		Contestant
Best State Costume	Winner	Texas – R'Bonney Gabriel
Best State Costume	Second Place	Tennessee – Emily Suttle
Best State Costume	Third Place	Maine – Elizabeth Kervin
Miss Congeniality		Alaska – Courtney Schuman
Miss Photogenic		Illinois – Angel Reyes

== Pageant ==
=== Judges ===
- Ashlee Clarke – American businesswoman and producer
- Soo Yeon Lee – South Korean table tennis player and model
- Kirk Myers – American fitness trainer
- Olivia Ponton – American model and social media influencer
- Aaron Potts – American fashion designer
- Nicole Williams-English – Canadian fashion designer and model

== Contestants ==
Fifty-one contestants competed for the title.

State/district	Contestant	Age (Note: Ages at the time of the pageant)	Hometown	Notes
Alabama	Katelyn Vinson	22	Dothan	
Alaska	Courtney Schuman	28	Anchorage	Previously Miss Alaska 2018
Arizona	Isabel Ticlo	28	Phoenix	Previously Miss Arizona 2018
Arkansas	Rylie Wagner	22	Ozark	
California	Tiffany Johnson	26	Lancaster	
Colorado	Alexis Glover	23	Colorado Springs	Previously Miss Colorado Teen USA 2017
Connecticut	Cynthia Dias	23	Wolcott	Previously Miss Connecticut's Outstanding Teen 2014
Delaware	Grace Lange	22	Newark	Previously Miss Delaware Teen USA 2017
District of Columbia	Faith Porter	23	Washington, D.C.	Later Miss Grand Ghana 2025, 3rd Runner-Up at Miss Grand International 2025
Florida	Taylor Fulford	28	Okeechobee	
Georgia	Holly Haynes	26	Sugar Hill	
Hawaii	Kiana Yamat	28	Honolulu	
Idaho	Jordana Dahmen	27	Boise	
Illinois	Angel Reyes	26	Chicago	
Indiana	Samantha Toney	27	Clarksville	
Iowa	Randi Estabrook	25	Des Moines	
Kansas	Elyse Noe	23	Lawrence	
Kentucky	Lizzy Neutz	23	Louisville	
Louisiana	KT Scannell	22	Denham Springs	
Maine	Elizabeth Kervin	20	Winterport	
Maryland	Caleigh Shade	23	Ocean City	Previously Miss Maryland Teen USA 2018
Massachusetts	Skarlet Ramirez	28	Lawrence	
Michigan	Aria Hutchinson	24	Plymouth	Daughter of Chris Hutchinson and Melissa Sinkevics Hutchinson, Miss Michigan Teen USA 1988, and sister of Aidan Hutchinson.
Minnesota	Madeline Helget	24	Clearwater	
Mississippi	Hailey White	23	Picayune	
Missouri	Mikala McGhee	28	St. Louis	
Montana	Heather Lee O'Keefe	25	Bozeman	
Nebraska	Natalie Pieper	27	Omaha	
Nevada	Summer Keffeler	21	Paradise	Previously Miss Washington Teen USA 2018; Sister of Stormy Keffeler, original titleholder of Miss Washington USA 2016
New Hampshire	Camila Sacco	27	Portsmouth	
New Jersey	Alexandra Lakhman	26	Hoboken	
New Mexico	Suzanne Perez	25	Portales	
New York	Heather Nunez	26	Queens	
North Carolina	Morgan Romano	24	Concord	Later assumed Miss USA 2022 after Gabriel won Miss Universe 2022
North Dakota	SaNoah LaRocque	25	Belcourt	
Ohio	Sir'Quora Carroll	23	Canal Winchester	
Oklahoma	Ashley Ehrhart	25	Oklahoma City	Previously National Sweetheart 2021
Oregon	Arielle Freytag	28	Harrisburg	
Pennsylvania	Billie LaRaé Owens	25	Phoenixville	Daughter of Billy Owens
Rhode Island	Elaine Collado	27	Providence	Previously Miss Rhode Island Teen USA 2013
South Carolina	Meera Bhonslé	26	Lexington	
South Dakota	Shania Knutson	22	Viborg	Previously Miss South Dakota Teen USA 2018
Tennessee	Emily Suttle	26	Franklin	Previously Miss Tennessee Teen USA 2013
Texas	R'Bonney Gabriel	28	Houston	Later crowned Miss Universe 2022, relinquished title
Utah	Elisabeth Bradley-Gandara	28	Salt Lake City	
Vermont	Kelsey Golonka	23	Montpelier	Previously Miss Vermont Teen USA 2017; Sister of Kenzie Golonka, Miss Vermont Teen USA 2022
Virginia	Kailee Horvath	23	Ashburn	
Washington	Mazzy Eckel	22	Seattle	
West Virginia	Krystian Leonard	25	Morgantown	
Wisconsin	Hollis Brown	26	Milwaukee	
Wyoming	Morgan McNally	27	Casper	
