= Oyster Creek (Texas) =

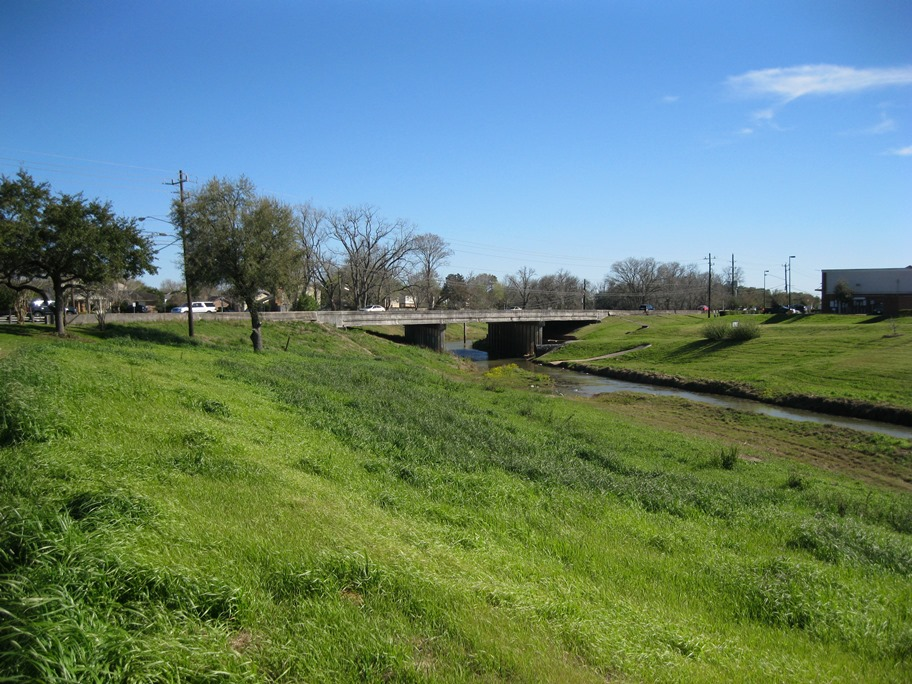
- FM 1092 bridge over Oyster Creek in Missouri City

Location
- Country: United States

Physical characteristics
- Source
  - location: Fort Bend County, Texas
- Mouth
  - location: Brazoria County, Texas
- Length: 52 mi (84 km)

Oyster Creek is a stream in Texas that rises at 29.66066°N 95.75697°W at a divergence from Dolly's Gully near Skinner Lane (Skinner Gate), north of Richmond in Fort Bend County. Likely Oyster Creek formerly rose at the mouth of Dolly's Gully on Jones Creek some 3500 feet to the SW prior to installation of control gates and a 350' channel from the (since removed) Second Lift pumping station by the Gulf Coast Water Authority, which utilizes the upper reaches of Oyster Creek to deliver municipal and irrigation water to various recipients in Fort Bend and Brazoria counties.

Oyster Creek is north and east of, and roughly parallel to, the Brazos River. It originally flowed southeast 52 miles to the Gulf of Mexico in Brazoria County. Portions of the stream no longer follow their natural course because in Missouri City the upper section has been partially channelized, ultimately connecting with the Brazos River via a short segment of Steep Bank Creek.

The lower section continues on its meandering path from about a mile southeast of Steep Bank Creek, draining into the Intracoastal Waterway north of Surfside Beach.

== See also ==
- List of rivers of Texas
- "An Analysis of Texas Waterways".
- "OYSTER CREEK (FORT BEND COUNTY)". Handbook of Texas Online, Texas State Historical Assn.

== Gallery ==
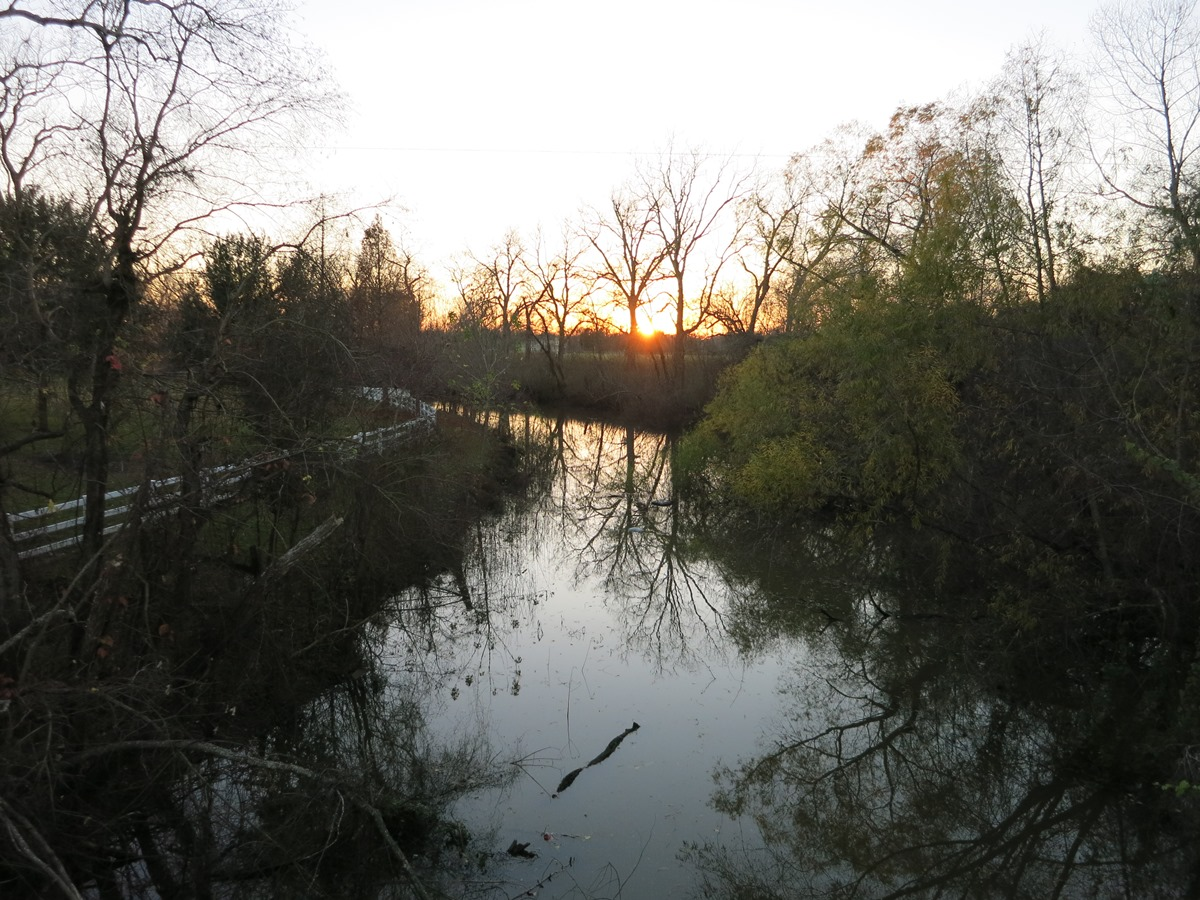
Oyster Creek at Lochridge near Rosharon

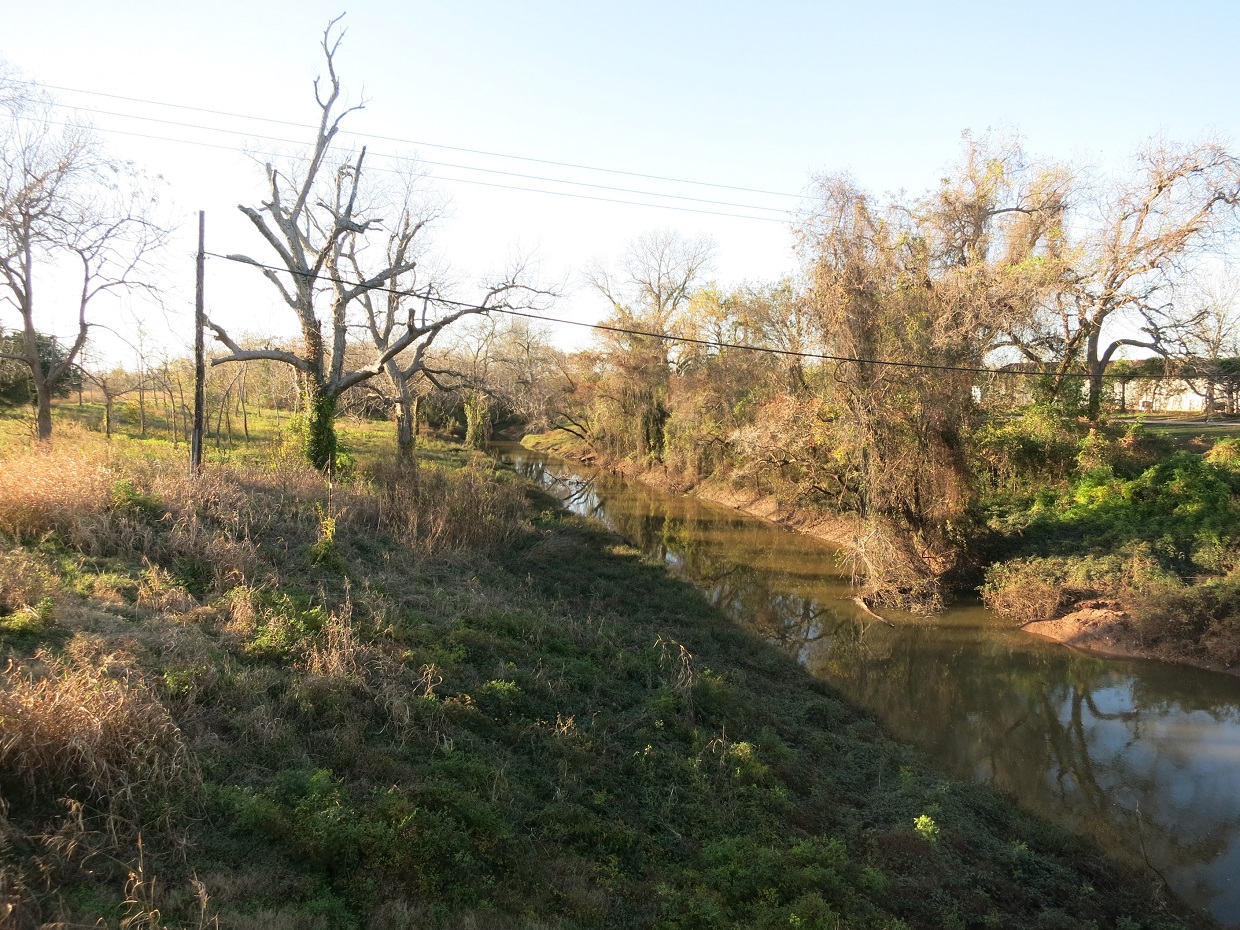
Oyster Creek at the FM 290 bridge in Snipe
