= Sugar Land Independent School District =

Defunct Texas school district

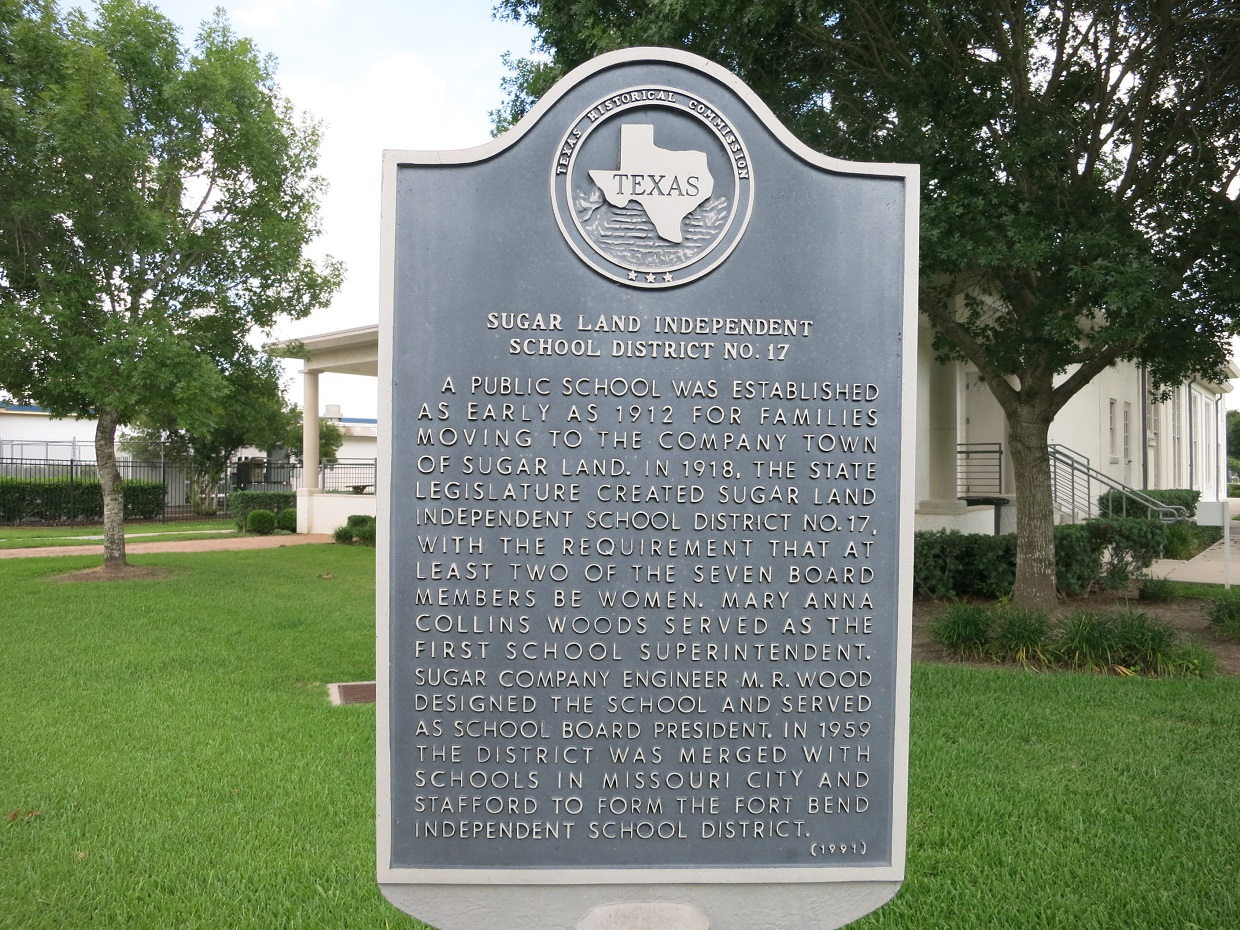
Historical marker

Sugar Land Independent School District #17 was a school district headquartered in Sugar Land, Texas.

== History ==
It was created under a state law that was approved and became law on March 18, 1918. Under state law, there was a 7-person board, and at least two members were required to be women. The first school board president was M. R. Wood, the designer of Sugar Land's first school, and Mary Anna Collins Woods was the first superintendent. Sugar Land's first public school had opened in 1912.

In the years 1924-1930 Carrin Foreman (died March 1, 1932), the sister of Percy Foreman, was the district superintendent. When she married she gave up her position.

It was dissolved in 1959 when it merged with the Missouri City Independent School District to form the Fort Bend Independent School District. Voters approved the consolidation on April 18 that year. Edward Mercer was the final superintendent of Sugar Land ISD, and he became assistant superintendent of the new FBISD.

As of 2017 the only remaining building operated by this district is the Sugar Land Auditorium, which as of that year is also the final public building that remained from the era when Sugar Land was a company town of Imperial Sugar.

== Schools ==
Schools were segregated racially.

For white children and others not black:

- Sugar Land High School

For black children:

- M.R. Wood School (1-12)
