= Greg Davidson (American football) =

American football player (1958–2024)

No. 66
- Position: Center

Personal information
- Born: April 24, 1958; Independence, Iowa, U.S.
- Died: June 2024 (aged 66)
- Listed height: 6 ft 2 in (1.88 m)
- Listed weight: 250 lb (113 kg)

Career information
- High school: John Foster Dulles (Sugar Land, Texas)
- College: North Texas
- NFL draft: 1980: undrafted

Career history
- Houston Oilers (1980–1982); San Antonio Gunslingers (1984)*; Michigan Panthers (1984)*; Houston Gamblers (1984)
- * Offseason or practice squad member only

Career NFL statistics
- Games played: 39
- Stats at Pro Football Reference

Gregory Merle Davidson (April 24, 1958 – June 2024) was an American professional football player who was a center in the National Football League (NFL) for three seasons. He played college football for the North Texas Mean Green and was signed by the Houston Oilers as an undrafted free agent in 1980. He died in 2024.

== Professional career ==
=== Houston Oilers ===
Davidson signed with the Houston Oilers as an undrafted free agent following the 1980 NFL draft. He played in 39 games for Houston over the next three seasons, serving as the backup center and long snapper. He was released before the 1983 season.

=== San Antonio Gunslingers/Michigan Panthers ===
In 1984, Davidson was signed by the San Antonio Gunslingers and quickly traded to the Michigan Panthers. Davidson did not play for either team.

=== Houston Gamblers ===
Davidson was signed by the Houston Gamblers on April 26, 1984. He played six games for the Gamblers in the 1984 season.

== Personal life ==
Davidson has four sons, including Beau and Christian Davidson, who both played college football. Beau played long snapper and tight end at Syracuse and North Texas from 2003 to 2007. He currently serves as the director of player personnel at University of Connecticut. Christian played long snapper at North Texas from 2005 to 2009, and currently coaches at Azle High School in Azle, Texas.
