= Fort Bend Independent School District =

School district in Texas

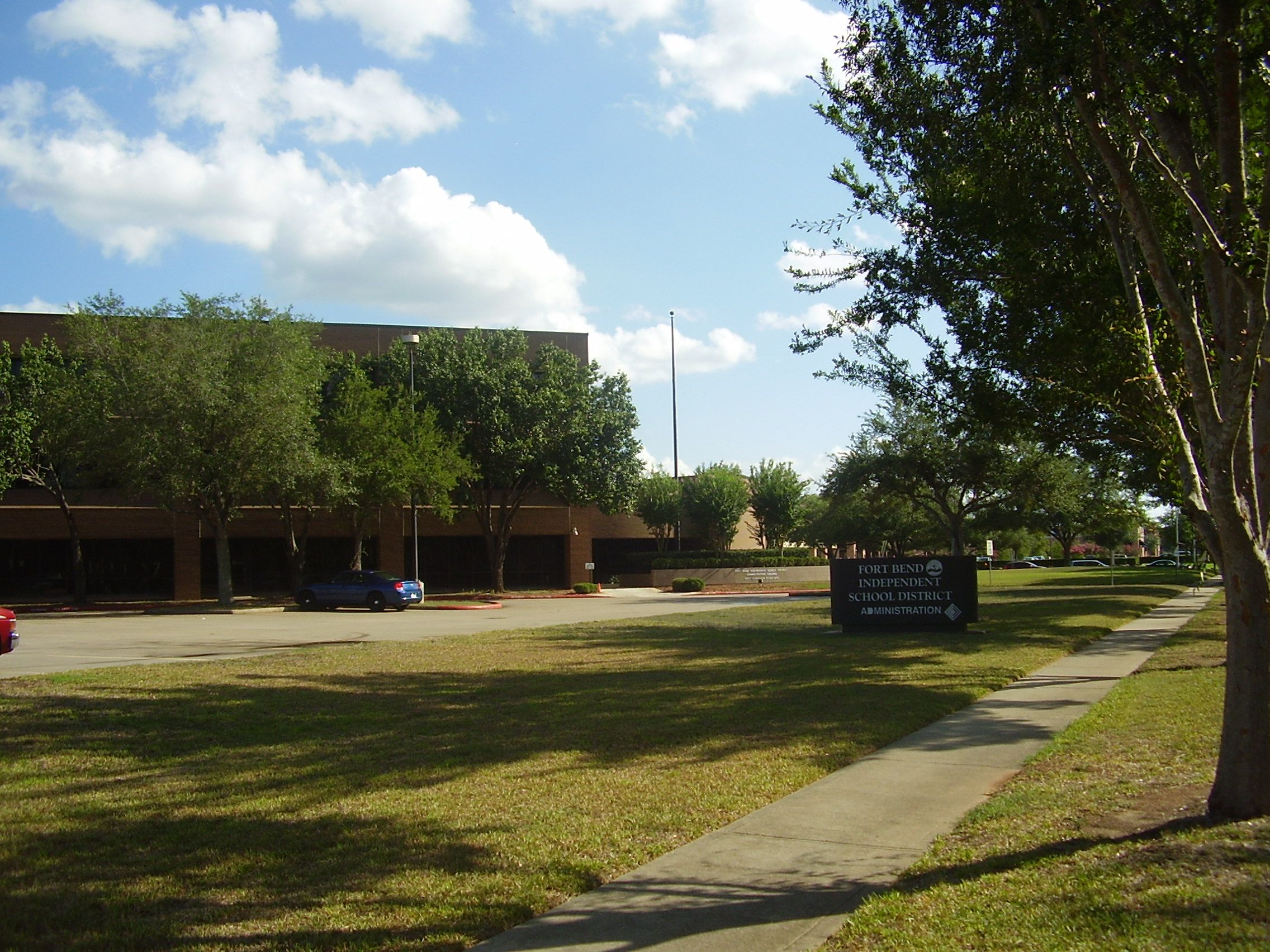
- Administration Building

Address
- 16431 Lexington Blvd Sugar Land, Fort Bend County, Texas, 77479; United States
- Coordinates: 29.5888°N 95.6229°W

District information
- Type: School District
- Motto: Inspire, Equip, Imagine
- Grades: Pre K-12
- Established: April 18, 1959
- Superintendent: Marc Smith
- Deputy superintendent(s): Beth Martinez; Kathleen Brown; Jaretha Jordan
- School board: 7 members
- Schools: 83
- NCES District ID: 4819650

Students and staff
- Students: 80,206 (2023–2024)
- Teachers: 4,923.65 (on an FTE basis) (2023–2024)
- Staff: 5,271.76 (on an FTE basis) (2023–2024)
- Student–teacher ratio: 16.29 (2023–2024)
- Athletic conference: University Interscholastic League

Other information
- Website: Official website

Fort Bend Independent School District, also known as Fort Bend ISD or FBISD, is a school district that operates 86 schools in Fort Bend County. Based in Sugar Land, Texas, it is the 5th most diverse school district in Texas and is the 43rd largest district in the United States.

The district spans 170 square miles (440 km^{2}) covering almost all of the city of Sugar Land, the city of Meadows Place, the Fort Bend county portion of Missouri City, Arcola, small sections of Houston, small sections of Pearland (including some of Shadow Creek Ranch), the unincorporated communities of Clodine, Four Corners, Juliff, and Fresno, and the Fort Bend County portion of Mission Bend.

Fort Bend Independent School District was created by the consolidation of the Sugar Land ISD and Missouri City ISD in 1959. The school district is the seventh-largest public school system in the state of Texas and third largest within the Houston–Sugar Land–Baytown Metropolitan Area. The school district is currently the largest employer in Fort Bend County with more than 11,000 district employees, and encompasses some of the wealthiest locales in the State of Texas.

Fort Bend ISD is distinguished by its honors. In 2010, the school district was rated "recognized" by the Texas Education Agency.

The district is the only school district in the nation to be named a 2011 National School District of Character by the National Schools of Character Program in Washington DC—and only one of two districts in Texas to be honored with this designation. The Washington Post ranked Clements, Austin, Kempner, Travis, Dulles, Hightower, and Elkins High Schools as seven of the Top 2011 High Schools in the Nation.

== History ==
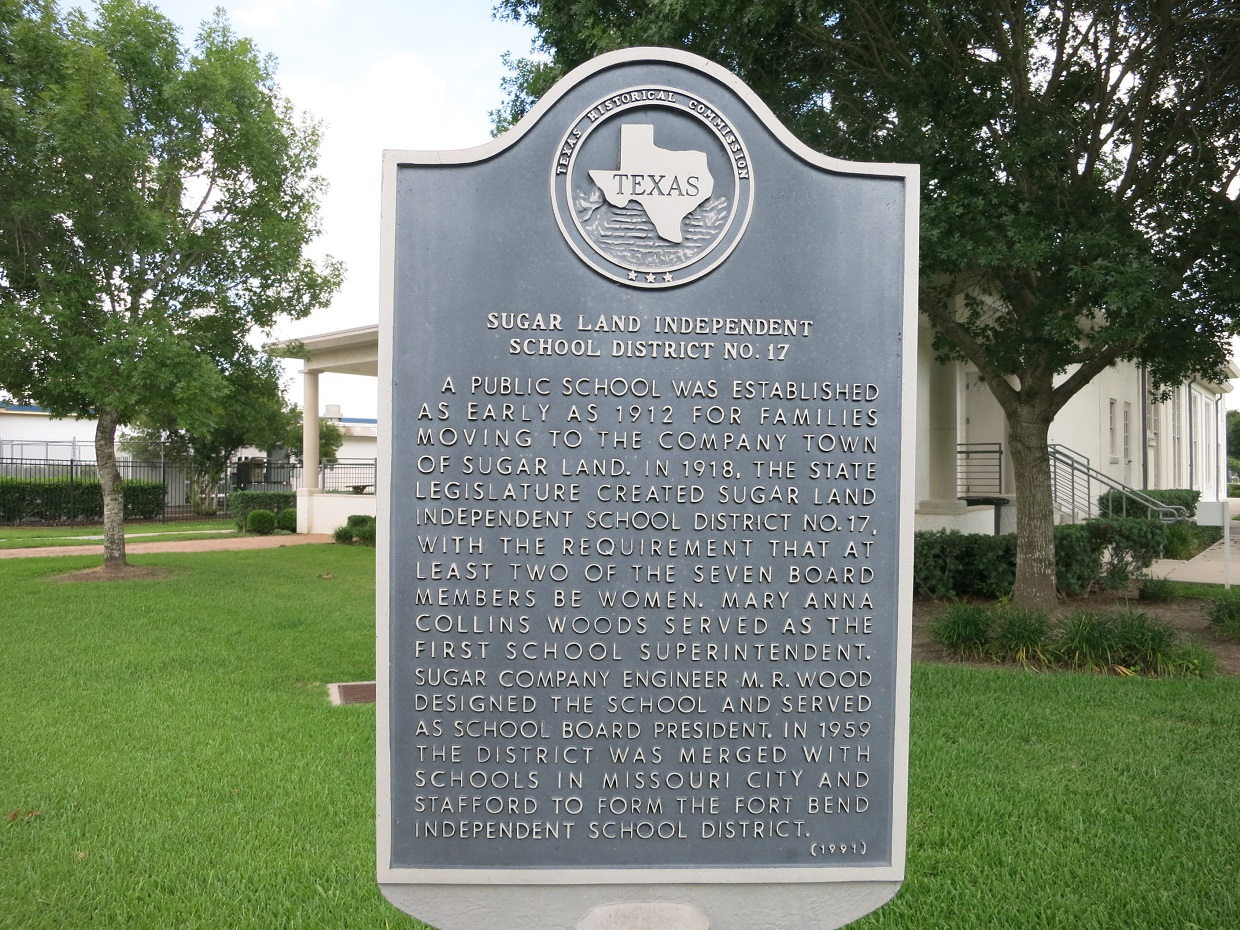
Historic marker of the former Sugar Land ISD near Lakeview Elem. School.

Fort Bend ISD was formed when Sugar Land ISD and Missouri City ISD merged after an election on April 18, 1959. The first superintendent was Louis P. Rodgers, who had been the Missouri City ISD superintendent upon the merger. The Sugar Land ISD superintendent Edward Mercer, became the assistant superintendent.

Missouri City ISD was formed from Missouri City Common School, House Common School, and Mustang Common School (Fresno area). Sugar Land ISD was formed in 1918 and was expanded by adding Sartartia Common School and Clodine Common School in 1948.

Originally FBISD was racially segregated, with white high school students attending the consolidated Dulles High School, with its permanent campus in Sugar Land, and black high school students attending M.R. Wood School in Sugar Land. In 1963, FBISD had 600 students. On June 23, 1964, the board of trustees for FBISD began the desegregation process via adopting a plan calling for freedom of choice for attending high schools. The plan was rejected by the commissioner of education for the Department of Health, Education and Welfare, and the following year on May 10, 1965, it was amended to mandate full desegregation and create zones based on equal ethnic distribution. The desegregation process went into effect in September 1965; in the post-desegregation period Dulles was the district's sole high school until Willowridge High School opened in 1979. Desegregation was officially dismantled in FBISD in 1968.

Rodgers died in May 1967 so Mercer became superintendent. Lawrence Elkins succeeded Mercer after the latter retired in August 1974.

In 1969 the school district had 1,000 students, and its enrollment was increasing. Between 1979 and 1997, a new high school opened at intervals no more than five years apart. The district became the fastest growing school district in the State of Texas. In August 1997 the district had over 14,000 students at its high schools, then numbering six.

A portion of Stafford was formerly a part of Fort Bend ISD, but it broke away and formed the Stafford Municipal School District. In 1977, largely in response to district policy barring bussing for students living within two miles of their schools, the FBISD portions of the city of Stafford voted to leave FBISD for the Stafford MSD. Several rounds of legal litigation ensued, largely stemming from concerns that the secession would impede on FBISD's desegregation process and worries that it would inspire others to leave the district (most notably in Sugar Land, where a sizable number of parents did seek to leave and carve their own school district). Ultimately, the move was found to be constitutional in 1981. Residents in Stafford's ETJ are served by Fort Bend ISD, not Stafford MSD.

In February 1984 Rodney E. LeBoeuf became superintendent. LeBouef left in March 1991 and Raj K. Chopra became superintendent in August of that year. Chopra left on July 20, 1994. The next superintendent, Don W. Hooper, assumed power on February 15, 1995.

Circa 1997 FBISD was the fastest-growing school district in Texas, with new comprehensive high schools opening in increments of fewer than five years.

Hooper's retirement was scheduled for June 2002.

In 2021, during the COVID-19 pandemic in Texas, the district administration chose not to make masks mandatory even though the Fort Bend county judge, KP George, issued a mask mandate. Governor of Texas Greg Abbott had prohibited local governments from issuing mask mandates. In August the district board voted 4–3 to reverse its stance and require masks.

On March 9th, 2026, the Fort Bend ISD Board of Trustees voted in favor (4-3) on closing seven elementary schools. The district cited a $56 Million deficit on top of declining enrollment rates as the key factors that pushed them to make the decision despite intense public outcry.

== Administration ==
The Fort Bend ISD Police Department is headquartered in Stafford. Its current headquarters was the former FBISD Administration Building located off FM1092 which was later converted into a vehicle maintenance facility after the administration HQ was moved to Sugar Land.

FBISD's current administration building is located in Sugar Land, near the Town Square and First Colony Mall. There is also the FBISD Annex, which contains an auditorium/banquet hall for FBISD, as well as a shop for teachers of FBISD.

When the district was first created Sugar Land Junior High School had the administrative offices. However, there was no tax assessor-collector in Sugar Land, so the taxation office was in Missouri City as that municipality did have one. In the summer of 1961 the district opened the first dedicated headquarters. In October 1985 the current district headquarters opened.

== District operations ==
In 2019 the FBISD administration stated that it was considering changing the class ranking system so that students are ranked according to the school's attendance zones in which they reside instead of the schools which they actually attend.

== Athletics and extracurriculars ==
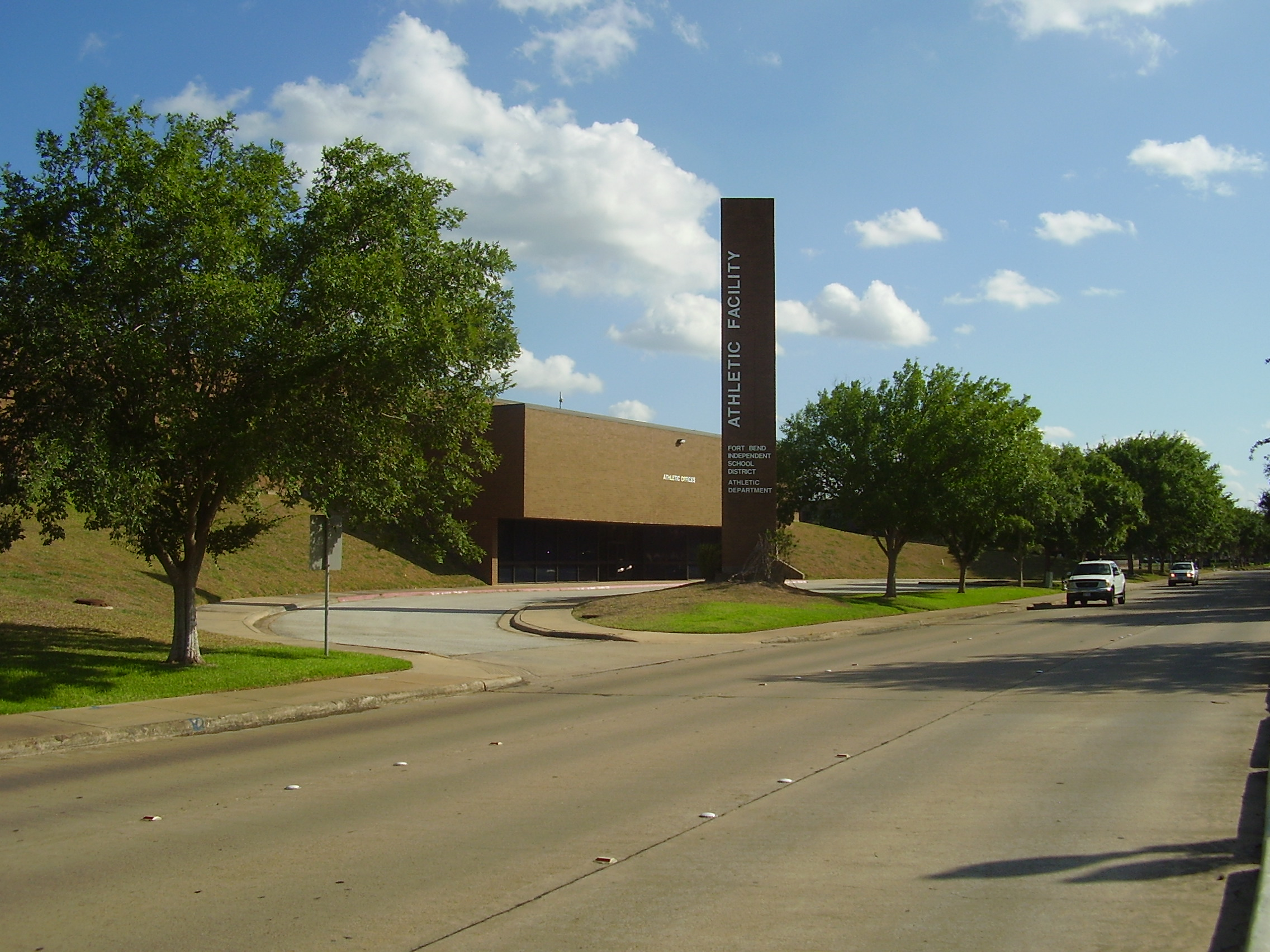
FBISD Athletic Facility

FBISD is known for having some of the best athletic teams in Houston. All 11 high schools contain 2 gyms, Tennis Courts, a football/soccer/track field, a softball field, and with 1 exception, a baseball field, each fitted with LED scoreboards.

FBISD also manages 2 athletic complexes, complete with turf and Video/LED scoreboards from NEVCO:

- Kenneth Hall Stadium (Football/Soccer/Track) and Buddy Hopson Field House (Gym) located next to Hightower
- Edward Mercer Stadium (Football/Soccer) and Wheeler Field House (gym) located next to the Admin Building
  - Frankie Field (Baseball) is also located next to Mercer, but it is Clements's Home Field

Louis P. Rodgers Memorial Auditorium in Dulles High School was built in 1969.

== Recognitions ==
Seventy percent of the district's campuses received an Exemplary or Recognized rating from the Texas Education Agency in 2002. That same year, the district was named a Recognized District by the Texas Education Agency for the second consecutive year, making it one of the largest public school districts in Texas to receive that rating. Currently the district is ranked "academically acceptable" and has been for the last several years.

Austin High School and Clements High School, both in Sugar Land, have been recognized by Texas Monthly magazine in its list of the top 10 high schools in the state of Texas. In addition, Clements, Austin, and Elkins high schools ranked 313th, 626th, and 702nd, respectively, among the top 1000 schools in the United States by Newsweek.

Fort Bend ISD has been named one of the top 100 School Districts in the Nation for a Fine Arts Education, according to a nationwide survey of public and private school programs.

== Governance ==
The current Superintendent is Dr. Marc Smith, who was chosen by the Board of Trustees on December 15, 2023. He was succeeded by Dr. Christie Whitbeck after her retirement was voted on by the Board of Trustees December 4, 2023. FBISD is served by a Board of Trustees who are periodically elected. Each trustee represents one of the seven regions in the school district.

== Schools ==
High schools (grades 9-12)
Name	Established	Mascot	Colors	Location	Additional information
Stephen F. Austin High School	1995	Bulldogs	Red, Black, & White	Sugar Land ETJ	
George Bush High School	2001	Broncos	Orange, Navy, & White	Richmond ETJ	
Almeta Crawford High School	2023	Chargers	Teal, Gray, & White	Rosharon	
William P. Clements High School	1983	Rangers	Columbia, Navy, & White	Sugar Land	
John Foster Dulles High School	1960	Vikings	Red, White, & Blue	Sugar Land	
Lawrence E. Elkins High School	1992	Knights	Royal Blue & Gold	Missouri City	
L.V Hightower High School	1998	Hurricanes	Black, Hunter Green, & Silver	Missouri City	
Isaac H. Kempner High School	1988	Cougars	Maroon, Silver, & White	Sugar Land	
Thurgood Marshall High School	2002	Buffalos	Black & Gold	Missouri City	
William B. Travis High School	2006	Tigers	Scarlet, Gray, & White	Richmond ETJ	
Ridge Point High School	2010	Panthers	Purple, Silver, & White	Missouri City ETJ	
Willowridge High School	1979	Eagles	Blue & Silver	Houston	

Middle schools (grades 6-8)
Name	Established	Mascot	Colors	Location	Additional information
Billy Baines Middle School	2006	Longhorns	Navy, Orange, & White	Sienna	
James Bowie Middle School	2011	Bears	Red & Brown	Richmond	
Amy Coleman Middle School	2026	Cowboys	Green & Gold	Fresno	
David Crockett Middle School	2007	Mavericks	Navy & White	Richmond	
First Colony Middle School	1985	Bobcats	Navy & Tan	Sugar Land	1999–2000 National Blue Ribbon School
Fort Settlement Middle School	2001	Falcons	Maroon, Gray, & Black	Sugar Land	2007-2008 National Blue Ribbon School
Hodges Bend Middle School	1987	Warriors	Maroon & White	Houston	
Lake Olympia Middle School	1992	Mustangs	Columbia & White	Missouri City	
Macario Garcia Middle School	1995	Gators	Columbia & Navy	Sugar Land ETJ	
John F. Dulles Middle School	1965	Vikings	Red & Blue	Sugar Land	
Christa McAuliffe Middle School	1986	Hawks	Purple & Black	Houston	
Missouri City Middle School	1975	Cougars	Blue & Gold	Missouri City	
Quail Valley Middle School	1978	Raiders	Green & Gold	Missouri City	Open from 1978-1994, 1996-present; Home of the FBISD Gifted and Talented Academy 2007-present
Sartartia Middle School	2001	Jaguars	Black & Gold	Sugar Land	
Sugar Land Middle School	1975	Titans	Red & White	Sugar Land	Former mascot was the Trojans
Ronald Thornton Middle School	2017	Thundercats	Gold, Purple & White	Sienna	

=== Elementary schools ===
- Allen Aldridge Jr. Elementary School (Missouri City) (opened 2025)
- Armstrong Elementary School (Missouri City) (opened 2008)
- Barrington Place Elementary School (Sugar Land) (opened 1990)
- Sonal Bhuchar Elementary School (Riverstone, Unincorporated area) - Opened 2023 - Named after an FBISD board member. It was originally scheduled to open in 2022.
- Brazos Bend Elementary School (Sugar Land) (opened 1997)
- Walter Moses Burton Elementary School (Unincorporated area) (opened 1996)
- Colony Bend Elementary School (Sugar Land) (opened 1981)
- Colony Meadows Elementary School (Sugar Land) (opened 1991)
- Commonwealth Elementary School (Sugar Land) (opened 1997)
- Cornerstone Elementary School (Sugar Land) (opened 2007)
- Rita Drabek Elementary School (Unincorporated area) (opened 2001)
- Alyssa Ferguson Elementary School (Missouri City) (opened 2023)
- Lula Goodman Elementary School (Unincorporated area) (opened 2000)
  - Goodman was one of two FBISD campuses that were the most damaged by Hurricane Harvey in 2017, but it reopened ahead of schedule.
- Ferndell Henry Elementary School (Rosharon) Opened 2025 - Built 2007 as the Ferndell Henry Center for Learning.
- Highlands Elementary School (Sugar Land) (opened 1986)
- Mary Austin Holley Elementary School (Unincorporated area) (opened 2007)
- Heritage Rose Elementary School (Rosharon) (opened 2010)
- Hunters Glen Elementary School (Missouri City) (opened 1985)
- E.A. Jones Elementary School (Missouri City) (opened 1954)
- Barbara Jordan Elementary School (Unincorporated area) (opened 2002)
- Lakeview Elementary School (Sugar Land) (opened 1962)
- Lantern Lane Elementary School (Missouri City) (opened 1979)
- Donald Leonetti Elementary (Sienna Plantation) (opened 2017)
- Lexington Creek Elementary School (Missouri City) (opened 1994)
- Carolyn and Vernon Madden Elementary School (Aliana, Unincorporated area) (opened 2015)
- Meadows Elementary School (Meadows Place) (opened 1973)
- James C. Neill Elementary School (Unincorporated area) (opened 2017)
- Oakland Elementary School (Unincorporated area) (opened 2006)
- Oyster Creek Elementary School (Unincorporated area) (opened 1999)
- Palmer Elementary School (Missouri City) (opened 1985)
- Rosa Parks Elementary School (Unincorporated area) (opened 2007)
- James Patterson Elementary (Unincorporated area) (opened 2017)
- Pecan Grove Elementary School (Unincorporated area) (opened 1988)
- Quail Valley Elementary School (Missouri City) (opened 1975)
- Ridgemont Elementary School (Houston) (opened 1973)
- Scanlan Oaks Elementary School (Unincorporated area) (opened 2004)
- Jan Schiff Elementary School (Missouri City) (opened 2008)
- Juan Seguin Elementary School (unincorporated area, Grand Mission) (opened 2009)
  - The capacity is 845, and the school is near Richmond. Molina Walker Architects designed the building and Marshall Construction did the building. The cost was $14,500,000. There are about 36 classrooms, with six per grade level. The school relieved Oakland Elementary School and took students from Mission West Elementary who were enrolled in bilingual programs. Seguin was one of the two FBISD campuses most damaged by Hurricane Harvey. James Patterson Elementary and David Crockett Middle temporarily took Seguin students.
- Settlers Way Elementary School (Sugar Land) (opened 1984)
- Sienna Crossing Elementary School (Unincorporated area) (opened 1998)
- Anne McCormick Sullivan Elementary (Riverstone, Unincorporated area) (opened 2016)
- Townewest Elementary School (Unincorporated area) (opened 1978)
- Walker Station Elementary School (Unincorporated area) (opened 1992)
- Malala Yousafzai Elementary School (Aliana, Unincorporated area) (opened 2020)

=== Other schools ===
- Progressive High School
  - Classes to help students who are behind in credits/grades
- Technical Education Center
  - Hosts CTE classes for all High schools in FBISD
- James Reese Career and Technical Center (opened 2018)
  - Newer center to replace aging TEC

== Academies ==
Fort Bend ISD opened several magnet programs to foster small learning communities with a career based focus. Several academies are housed at different schools and are magnet programs that require an application. The district provides busing throughout the district for academy students, irrespective of which school they choose to attend, located at their zoned elementary campus (or another location deemed appropriate by staff/parents). A few of the academies were shut down due to low application and attendance rates.

=== Middle school ===
- Quail Valley Middle School Academy for the Gifted and Talented (For GT Identified)

=== High school ===
- Global Studies Academy (GSA) (Kempner HS)*
- International Business and Marketing Academy (IBMA) (Kempner HS)*
- Engineering Academy (EA) (Elkins HS)
- Math and Science Academy (MSA) (Dulles HS)
- Medical Science Academy (MSA) (Hightower HS)
- Digital Media Academy (DMA) (Hightower HS)

*The GSA and IBMA academies are under a transition period to Kempner HS.

- GSA for '26 are held at Travis HS.
- IBMA for '26 are held at Travis HS

C.O '27 (+) for both academies are at Kempner

== Former schools ==
- Oaklane Elementary School (Arcola, then unincorporated) (1-8 elementary school for black students) (closed 1965)
  - Oaklane children were reassigned to Blue Ridge Elementary School, currently in Houston.
- Staffordshire Elementary School (Stafford) (1-4 elementary school) (closed 1965)
  - Students were reassigned to E. A. Jones Elementary School in Missouri City
- Annie Wilcox Elementary School (closed 1969)
- M. R. Wood Alternative Education Center (formerly a 1-12 school for black students)
  - Hosts students who have special needs
  - Originally housed DAEP Program for entire district (west side when FHCL opened)
- Mission Bend Elementary School (Unincorporated area) (consolidated with Mission Glen Elementary School 2023)
  - MBE was demolished during 2023 to make way for the new 'Mission Elementary', which opened for the 2025-2026 school year
- Mission Glen Elementary School (Unincorporated area) (consolidated with Mission Bend Elementary School 2023)
  - Misson Glen's campus was used to house both MGE and MBE during the 2023-2024 school year and the 2024-2025 school year respectively.
- Briargate Elementary School (Unincorporated area) (consolidated with Blue Ridge Elementary School 2023)
  - BGE was demolished during 2024 to make way for the new 'Allen Aldridge Elementary', which opened for the 2025-2026 school year
- Blue Ridge Elementary School (Unincorporated area) (consolidated with Briargate Elementary School 2023)
  - Blue Ridge's campus was used to house both BRE and BGE during the 2023-2024 school year and the 2024-2025 school year respectively.

== 2026 closures ==
- Arizona Fleming Elementary School (Unincorporated area) (1994-2026)
- Austin Parkway Elementary School (Sugar Land) (1989-2026)
- Dulles Elementary School (Sugar Land) (1976-2026)
- Edgar Glover Elementary School (Missouri City) (1994-2026)
- Mission West Elementary School (Unincorporated area) (1991-2026)
- Ridgegate Elementary School (Houston) (1981-2026)
- Sugar Mill Elementary School (Sugar Land) (1984-2026)

== Facilities ==
In 1999 a bond to build a new stadium was approved. The stadium was to be placed adjacent to Hightower High. The stadium had Sugar Land High School American football player Ken Hall as a namesake, and an adjacent field house had teacher and coach Buddy Hopson as a namesake.

== See also ==
- Sugar Land, Texas
- Fort Bend County, Texas
- Houston, Texas
- Missouri City, Texas
- Meadows Place, Texas
- Pearland, Texas
- Arcola, Texas
