= Dulles High School (Sugar Land, Texas) =

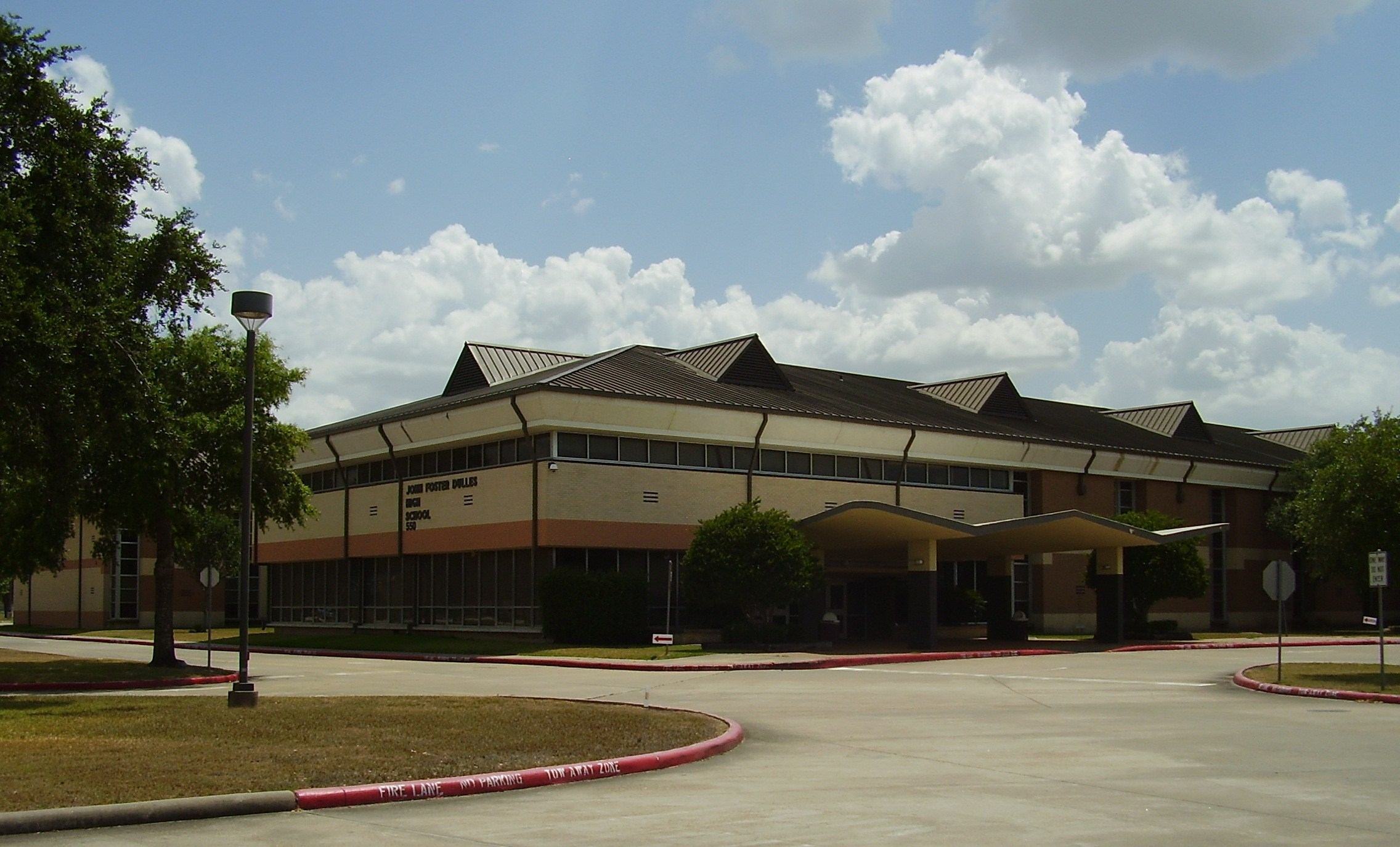

Location
- 550 Dulles Avenue; Sugar Land, Texas 77478; United States; 29.62037°N 95.58418°W

Information
- Type: Public
- Established: 1959
- School district: Fort Bend Independent School District
- NCES District ID: 4819650
- Superintendent: Marcell Smith
- CEEB code: 446785
- NCES School ID: 481965001818
- Principal: Corey Stewart
- Teaching staff: 158.8 (FTE)
- Grades: 9-12
- Enrollment: 2,128 (2025-2026)
- Student to teacher ratio: 17.3
- Campus type: Suburban
- Colors: Red, White, Blue
- Slogan: Set Sail
- Athletics: Yes
- Athletics conference: UIL Class AAAAAA
- Mascot: Big Red
- Nickname: Vikings
- Rival: Clements High School
- Magnet program(s): Math & Science Academy
- Website: dhs.fortbendisd.gov
- Last updated: October 19, 2025

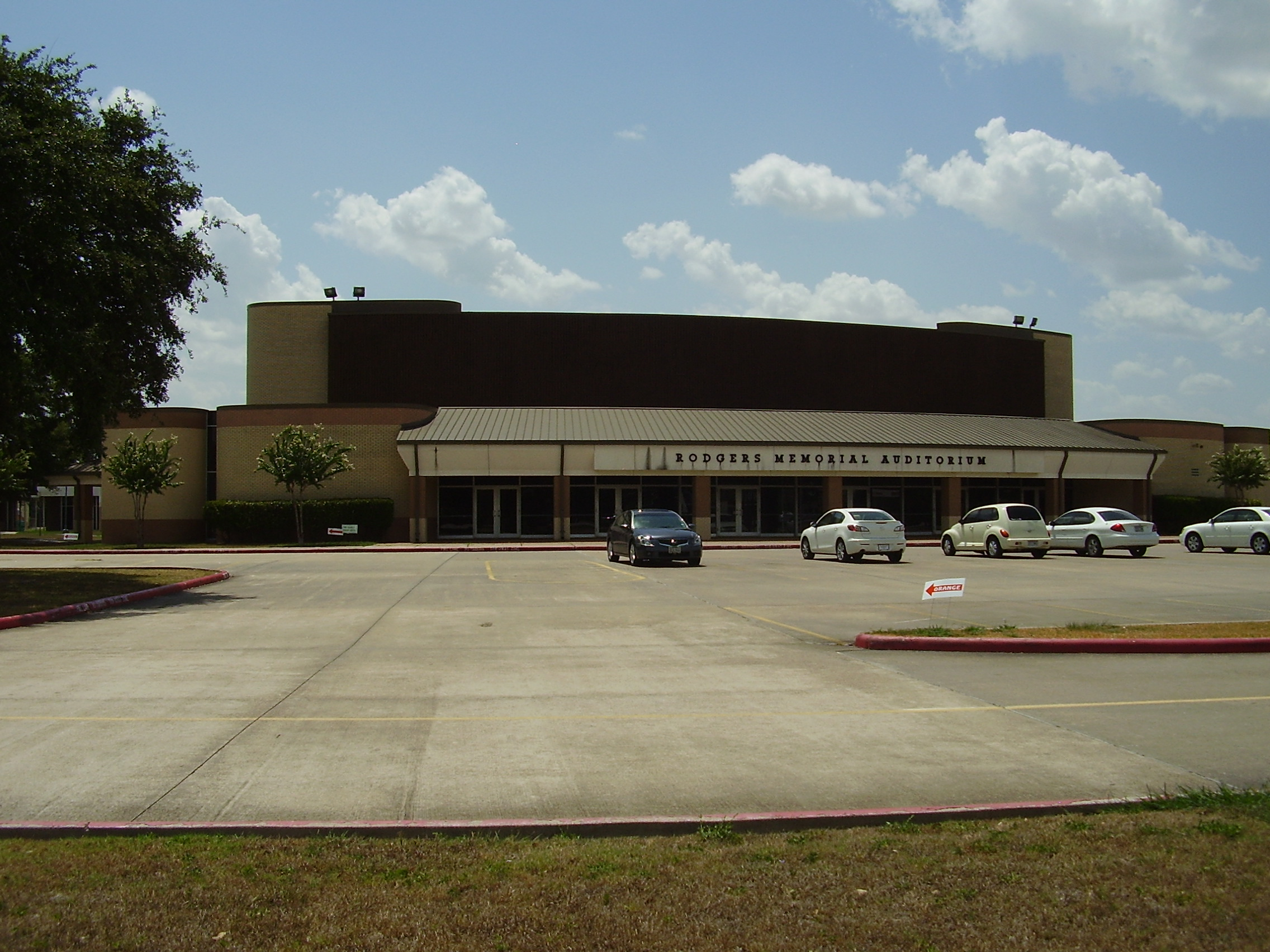
Rodgers Memorial Auditorium

John Foster Dulles High School, more commonly known as Dulles High School, is a high school in Sugar Land, Texas. It was the first site purchase and new build, in the 1950s, of the newly formed Fort Bend Independent School District (FBISD), which held its first graduation in 1960. The first class to graduate from Dulles itself was 1962. Its mascot is the Viking, and its team colors are red, white and blue. Its slogan was "Set Sail" up until the end of the 2018–2019 school year, but was changed to "Viking True" the next school year. It was changed back to "Set Sail" in the 2024-2025 school year.

At its highest, the school roll was over 4,000 students during the 1976–1977 school year. During the 2006–2007 school year, the roll comprised 2,291. The school serves children from parts of Sugar Land, Missouri City and the city of Meadows Place as well as portions of the extraterritorial jurisdiction (ETJ) of Stafford, and a portion of the First Colony community. In previous eras, from 1959 onward, Dulles was the lone public high school serving east Fort Bend County, including the Four Corners community, and it served most of (the Fort Bend County portion of) the City of Stafford until the city broke away from FBISD in 1977.

Dulles was named a National Blue Ribbon School in 1984, meeting criteria of an "Exemplary High Performing Public School" having "excellence in the fields of academics, arts, and athletics."

As of 2026, the principal is Corey Stewart, a retired United States Marine.

== History ==
Circa the 1950s, the Kempner brothers rejected the idea of a new Sugar Land high school being named after them because they believed that students would prefer to have their school named after figures from previous wars who won honors and/or athletes; this was despite the fact that officials from the Texas educational agency had approved the naming, initially proposed by Sugar Land citizens. It is named after the eponymous John Foster Dulles, the American Secretary of State and diplomat who died the year the high school opened.

Dulles formed in 1959 from a merger of Missouri City High School and Sugar Land High School. Dulles was classified by the University Interscholastic League school as a "Class B" school until 1972 when it became classified as a 4A school, then the largest classification in the state. From its opening, Dulles was the only zoned high school in the district for whites/students not black, and after desegregation, the only zoned high school for all students until Willowridge High School opened in 1979. FBISD racially desegregated in 1965; before that year, black high school students attended M.R. Wood School in Sugar Land which was converted into a school for disobedient children.

=== Principals ===
- Bill Shaver was principal of Dulles from 1960's to 1984.
- James Patterson was principal of Dulles from 1984 through 1991.
- Mark Foust was principal of Dulles until 2013.
- In 2013, Ronnie Edwards became the school's principal.
- In 2016, Jennifer Nichols, became the school's principal.
- In 2019, Melissa King-Knowles became the school's principal.
- In 2021, Corey Stewart became the school's principal.

== Academics ==
Dulles is home to the Math and Science Academy, which provides students with even more options to extend their studies in these areas. Dulles is one of the only schools in the state to offer Chem III or Organic Chemistry. Starting with the 2013–2014 school year, Biotechnology (Biology III) is offered as an honors course. Modern Physics (Physics III) has been added to the math and science curriculum as well. Calculus III, or multivariable calculus, is offered to students who have finished Calculus BC before their senior year. Other classes include Chem II, Bio II, and Physics II C. Dulles offers a total of 24 AP courses. Scientific Research and Design is an honors class offered in which students work with mentors to write papers and develop projects, and some of these projects will be submitted to prestigious competitions such as Siemens or ISEF. Students take the class to fulfill the research requirement of the academy.

== Campus ==
Louis P. Rodgers Memorial Auditorium in Dulles High School was built in 1969. Its namesake was FBISD's first superintendent.

== Other notable clubs ==
=== Academic Decathlon ===
Dulles was the 2017, 2018, 2020, 2021 6A Texas Academic Decathlon State Champion. In 1987, 2019, and 2022, it was also the Texas Academic Decathlon Overall State Champion. It achieved the record for highest team score in Texas history in 2019.

Academic Decathlon State Championship Titles

- 2024 - Overall State Champion
- 2023 - Overall State Champion
- 2022 - Overall State Champion
- 2019 - Overall State Champion
- 1987 - Overall State Champion

=== Speech and Debate Team ===
- 2012 - UIL Cross-Examination Debate State Champions
- 2011 - UIL Cross-Examination Debate State Champions
- 2010 - UIL Cross-Examination Debate State Champions
- 2009 - UIL Cross-Examination Debate State Champions
- 2006 - NFL Lincoln Douglas Debate National Champion

=== National Science Bowl ===
2012, 2013, 2014, 2015, 2017, 2018, 2019, 2020, 2021, 2022, 2023, 2024 Texas A&M Regional Science Bowl Champions

2019 National Science Bowl Runner-Ups (Second Place)

Science Bowl was founded in 2012 at Dulles High School, and the organization has achieved prolific success at the regional competition, winning in every year except 2016. At the national competition, Dulles High School has reached the top 16 eight times.

== Athletics ==
Dulles athletics are included in UIL District 20-6A division. Other members include FB Austin, FB Bush, FB Clements, FB Elkins, FB Ridge Point, FB Hightower, FB Kempner, and FB Travis.

Boys Athletics

- Baseball
- Basketball
- Cross Country
- Football
- Golf
- Soccer
- Swimming/Diving
- Tennis
- Track/Field
- Water Polo

Girls Athletics

- Basketball
- Cheer
- Cross Country
- Golf
- Soccer
- Softball
- Swimming/Diving
- Tennis
- Track/Field
- Volleyball
- Water Polo

=== AFJROTC ===
The JROTC unit at Dulles is an Air Force JROTC program. Its designation is TX-862, signifying that it was the second Air Force JROTC program created in Texas in 1986.

It won its last major award in 2006. The color guard has won 1st at its last 4 region-wide competitions, the last one being at the FBISD drill competition in 2019. The drill team has won at its last 2 region-wide competitions.

As a unit, TX-862 achieved its first Meritorious Unit award in 1988, and continued to earn this distinction from 1988 - 1992. In 1993, it achieved its first Honor Unit award, and earned this distinction through at least 1997.

The TX-862 Unit had eventually received their first Distinguished Unit Award with Merit in their unit lifetime on April 23, 2011.

== Other information ==
=== Notable alumni ===
- Paul Begala (Class of 1979), Democratic political consultant for Bill Clinton's successful 1992 United States presidential campaign and a current political pundit for CNN
- Roger Clemens (Class of 1979), Former Houston Astros, New York Yankees, Toronto Blue Jays, and Boston Red Sox pitcher and winner of seven Cy Young Awards (attended during the sophomore year before transferring to Spring Woods High School)
- Greg Davidson (Class of 1976), Former professional football player who played at North Texas and later for the Houston Oilers and Houston Gamblers
- Sarah Davis (Class of 1994), Attorney, State Representative (R-West University Place, Texas; 2011 to present)
- Billy Stritch (Class of 1979), notable jazz singer and pianist
- Kevin Eschenfelder (Class of 1983), sportscaster and studio host, FSN Southwest
- Sean Patrick Flanery (Class of 1984), American film actor
- Kelsey Bone (Class of 2009), Professional basketball player for the Connecticut Sun in the WNBA
- Billy Ray Brown (Class of 1981), Professional Golfer
- Rhea Walls (Class of 2013), Stellar Award-winning Gospel recording Artist
- Alic Walls (Class of 2014), Stellar Award-winning Gospel recording Artist
- Ahjah Walls (Class of 2015), Stellar Award-winning Gospel recording
- Ainias Smith (Class of 2019), Super Bowl champion and wide receiver for the Philadelphia Eagles in the NFL
- Nick Hernandez (Class of 2013) Professional baseball pitcher for the Houston Astros

=== Feeder patterns ===
The following elementary schools feed into Dulles H.S.:

- Barrington Place (partial)
- Highlands
- Lexington Creek
- Meadows

The following middle school feeds into Dulles H.S.:

- Dulles

=== Notoriety ===
==== Cyber-bullying ====
Dulles, along with the other Fort Bend High Schools of Elkins and Clements, was subject to an act of cyber terrorism when a list titled Whimsical Girls of FBISD was posted on Facebook in April 2010. The list named several female students from the three high schools with graphic detail of promiscuous acts that the girls performed, locations of the acts, as well as severe name calling. While some described this as tattle-taling, others argued that the list was a direct form of verbal assault and demanded the expulsion of the offender who posted the list.
