= Sugar Land High School =

School in Sugar Land, Texas, United States

Sugar Land High School was a senior high school in Sugar Land, Texas and a part of the Sugar Land Independent School District. Children who were white and of groups not black attended this school.

Circa the 1940s many alumni of Sugar Land High attended colleges and universities. The Kempner family arranged to have the campus built.

In 1959 Sugar Land High merged with Missouri City High School to form Dulles High School. This occurred as Sugar Land ISD and Missouri City Independent School District merged, becoming the Fort Bend Independent School District.

Lakeview Elementary School is on the former site of Sugar Land High.

== Athletics ==
In 1952 and 1953 the baseball relay team won state championships.

In 1958 the girls' basketball team made it to the Texas State Tournament. The city government stated in the book Sugar Land that in the late 1950s its girls' basketball programs were a "raging success".
