= M. R. Wood Alternative Education Center =

Location
- 138 Avenue F Sugar Land, Fort Bend County, Texas 77498; United States
- 29.6260483°N 95.63696399999998°W

Information
- Established: 1918
- School district: Fort Bend Independent School District
- NCES District ID: 4819650
- Educational authority: Texas Education Agency
- Superintendent: Marc Smith
- NCES School ID: 481965012235
- Principal: Cozette Church Gastion
- Teaching staff: 28.25 (FTE)
- Gender: Coeducational
- Enrollment: 134 (2024-2025)
  - Grade 6: 3
  - Grade 7: 11
  - Grade 8: 16
  - Grade 9: 35
  - Grade 10: 37
  - Grade 11: 21
  - Grade 12: 11
- Student to teacher ratio: 4.74
- Hours in school day: 7.25
- Athletics: No
- Mascot: Panthers
- Website: fortbendisd.com/mrwcl
- Last updated: 29 December 2017

M. R. Wood Alternative Education Center (MRW), also known as the M. R. Wood Center for Learning, was an alternative school in Sugar Land, Texas and a part of the Fort Bend Independent School District (FBISD). It was in proximity to the Imperial Sugar plant.

== History ==
As M.R. Wood School it was historically a segregated school for black students. Housing grades 1-12, it opened in the 1940s. It was originally a part of the Sugar Land Independent School District until it merged with the Missouri City Independent School District to form the FBISD in 1959. At one point black students from Missouri City were moved to M.R. Wood from Missouri City High School.

The panthers were the school mascot. In the 1950s and 1960s the American football team won eight district championships in a row. The 2010 book Sugar Land, written by the city government, stated that M.R. Wood's athletic teams performed highly.

As the desegregation process occurred in September 1965, M.R. Wood students temporarily went to the Lakeview School. After desegregation, Dulles High School was the only zoned high school for students of all races until Willowridge High School opened in 1979. Lakeview became the home for other former M. R. Wood students.

Wood was changed into an alternative education school housing all special education programs. In August 1992 its name changed to the M. R. Wood Alternative Education Center. At some point education of special education students was moved to the local public schools due to new state laws.

By 2001 there were seven programs at M. R. Wood. The school was the site of FBISD's Behavioral Learning Center, for students who have violated disciplinary codes. As of that year conditions were crowded; there was capacity for 150 students. Conditions remained crowded by 2003, with many temporary buildings being used. FBISD hoped to establish another disciplinary school in the eastern edge of the district.

== See also ==
- History of the African-Americans in Houston
