= Meadows Place, Texas =

City in Texas

- City
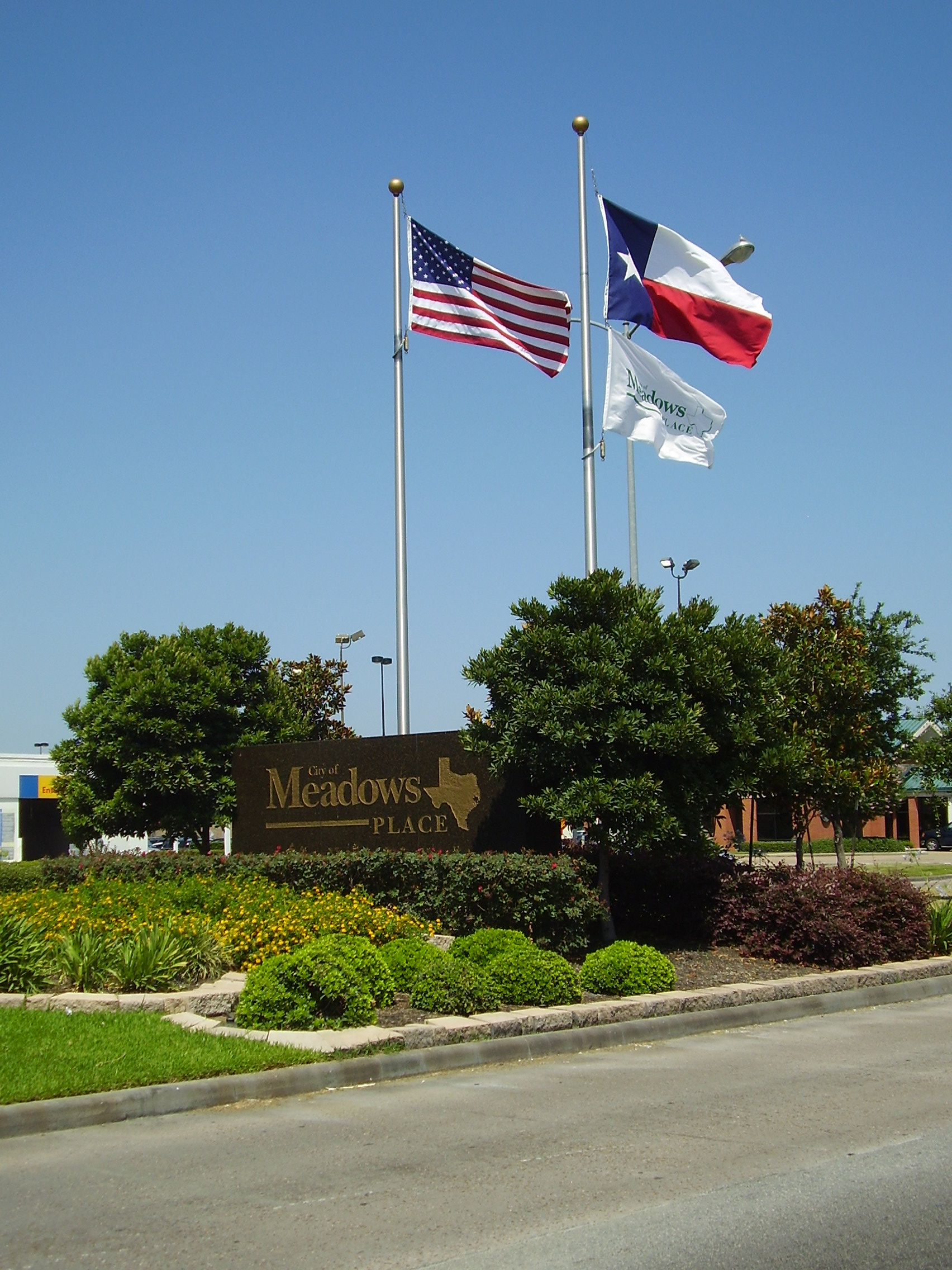
- A sign indicating Meadows Place

- Coordinates: 29°38′59″N 95°35′19″W
- Country: United States
- State: Texas
- County: Fort Bend
- Incorporated: November 14, 1983

Government
  - Mayor: Audrey St. Germain

Area
  - Total: 0.93 sq mi (2.42 km^{2})
  - Land: 0.93 sq mi (2.42 km^{2})
  - Water: 0 sq mi (0.00 km^{2})

Population (2020)
  - Total: 4,767
  - Density: 4,919/sq mi (1,899.3/km^{2})
- Time zone: UTC-6 (Central (CST))
  - Summer (DST): UTC-5 (CDT)
- ZIP code: 77477
- FIPS code: 48-47337
- Website: www.cityofmeadowsplace.org

Meadows Place is a city located in Fort Bend County in the U.S. state of Texas within the Houston–Pasadena–The Woodlands metropolitan area. As of the 2020 census, Meadows Place had a population of 4,767.

Meadows Place was part of Stafford's extraterritorial jurisdiction prior to incorporation on November 14, 1983. Meadows Place was incorporated as Meadows, but this was changed to "Meadows Place" in 1997 due to postal conflicts with a city of a similar name, Meadow, Texas.

== History ==
Meadows Place began as the Meadows Municipal Utility District, which had been established in 1967.The Meadows Place development farmland was purchased by Ayrshire Corporation. In 1968, the first houses were constructed by Ayrshire Corporation, a second-generation family-owned company founded in 1946. Ayrshire has developed mix use property throughout the United States and Australia. The Meadows place development is representative of their development capabilities. Meadows incorporated on November 14, 1983, to avoid being annexed by Houston. In 1990, the city had 4,606 residents. The population in 2010 was listed as 4,660 residents. In June 2012, Meadows Place received an award from Keep Texas Beautiful for a water reuse project that culminated in a beautiful new lake in the center of the city which, in addition to recreation, is used for irrigation of most of the city's parks land and baseball complex. So dramatic was the transformation, Meadows Place was asked to make a poster presentation at the 28th annual Water ReUse Symposium in Denver, Colorado. The presentation—"No City is Too Small to Receive Benefits from Water Reuse"—met with such acclaim they were invited to share their story at an international water convention. Hundreds of people from the US, Canada, Mexico, even Sweden and Norway, have come to see how a small city with limited resources could bring such a project to fruition.

== Geography ==
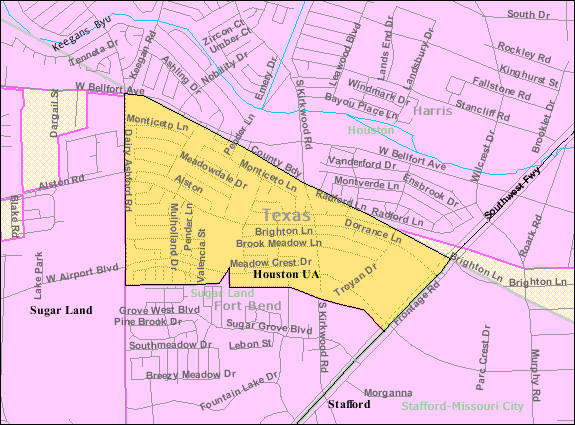
Map of Meadows Place

Meadows Place is located along the northeast border of Fort Bend County at 29°38′59″N 95°35′19″W (29.649599, –95.588747). It is bordered by the city of Sugar Land to the west, Stafford to the south, and Houston to the northeast in Harris County. Downtown Houston is 16 miles (26 km) to the northeast via Interstate 69, the Southwest Freeway.

According to the United States Census Bureau, the city has a total area of 0.9 square miles (2.3 km^{2}), all land.

The city is located between West Bellfort Avenue, U.S. Route 59/I-69, Dairy Ashford Road, and West Airport Boulevard. Meadows Place is 1 mile (1.6 km) southwest of Houston's Beltway 8.

== Demographics ==
Historical population
Census	Pop.	Note	%±
1990	4,606		—
2000	4,912		6.6%
2010	4,660		−5.1%
2020	4,767		2.3%
U.S. Decennial Census

=== Racial and ethnic composition ===
Meadows Place city, Texas – Racial and ethnic composition Note: the US Census treats Hispanic/Latino as an ethnic category. This table excludes Latinos from the racial categories and assigns them to a separate category. Hispanics/Latinos may be of any race.
Race / Ethnicity (NH = Non-Hispanic)	Pop 2000	Pop 2010	Pop 2020	% 2000	% 2010	% 2020
White alone (NH)	3,162	2,465	2,039	64.37%	52.90%	42.77%
Black or African American alone (NH)	291	423	480	5.92%	9.08%	10.07%
Native American or Alaska Native alone (NH)	9	8	7	0.18%	0.17%	0.15%
Asian alone (NH)	767	804	858	15.61%	17.25%	18.00%
Native Hawaiian or Pacific Islander alone (NH)	5	5	0	0.10%	0.11%	0.00%
Other race alone (NH)	14	17	18	0.29%	0.36%	0.38%
Mixed race or Multiracial (NH)	101	91	192	2.06%	1.95%	4.03%
Hispanic or Latino (any race)	563	847	1,173	11.46%	18.18%	24.61%
Total	4,912	4,660	4,767	100.00%	100.00%	100.00%

=== 2020 census ===
As of the 2020 census, Meadows Place had a population of 4,767. The median age was 43.5 years, 20.9% of residents were under the age of 18, and 22.8% of residents were 65 years of age or older. For every 100 females there were 86.0 males, and for every 100 females age 18 and over there were 83.2 males age 18 and over.

100.0% of residents lived in urban areas, while 0.0% lived in rural areas.

There were 1,825 households in Meadows Place, of which 30.9% had children under the age of 18 living in them. Of all households, 51.3% were married-couple households, 13.8% were households with a male householder and no spouse or partner present, and 32.2% were households with a female householder and no spouse or partner present. About 27.0% of all households were made up of individuals and 16.9% had someone living alone who was 65 years of age or older.

There were 1,962 housing units, of which 7.0% were vacant. The homeowner vacancy rate was 1.7% and the rental vacancy rate was 15.2%.

=== 2000 census ===
As of the census of 2000, there were 4,912 people, 1,598 households, and 1,358 families residing in the city. The population density was 5,247.8 inhabitants per square mile (2,026.2/km^{2}). There were 1,616 housing units at an average density of 1,726.5 per square mile (666.6/km^{2}). The racial makeup of the city was 71.82% White, 6.09% African American, 0.22% Native American, 15.72% Asian, 0.10% Pacific Islander, 3.24% from other races, and 2.81% from two or more races. Hispanic or Latino of any race were 11.46% of the population.

There were 1,598 households, out of which 43.2% had children under the age of 18 living with them, 70.9% were married couples living together, 10.8% had a female householder with no husband present, and 15.0% were non-families. 12.6% of all households were made up of individuals, and 2.9% had someone living alone who was 65 years of age or older. The average household size was 3.01 and the average family size was 3.28.

In the city, the population was spread out, with 27.9% under the age of 18, 6.8% from 18 to 24, 26.5% from 25 to 44, 29.7% from 45 to 64, and 9.2% who were 65 years of age or older. The median age was 39 years. For every 100 females, there were 90.2 males. For every 100 females age 18 and over, there were 86.4 males.

The median income for a household in the city was $73,180, and the median income for a family was $75,708. Males had a median income of $51,173 versus $35,929 for females. The per capita income for the city was $27,134. About 1.7% of families and 4.5% of the population were below the poverty line, including 5.8% of those under age 18 and 14.5% of those age 65 or over.

== Government ==
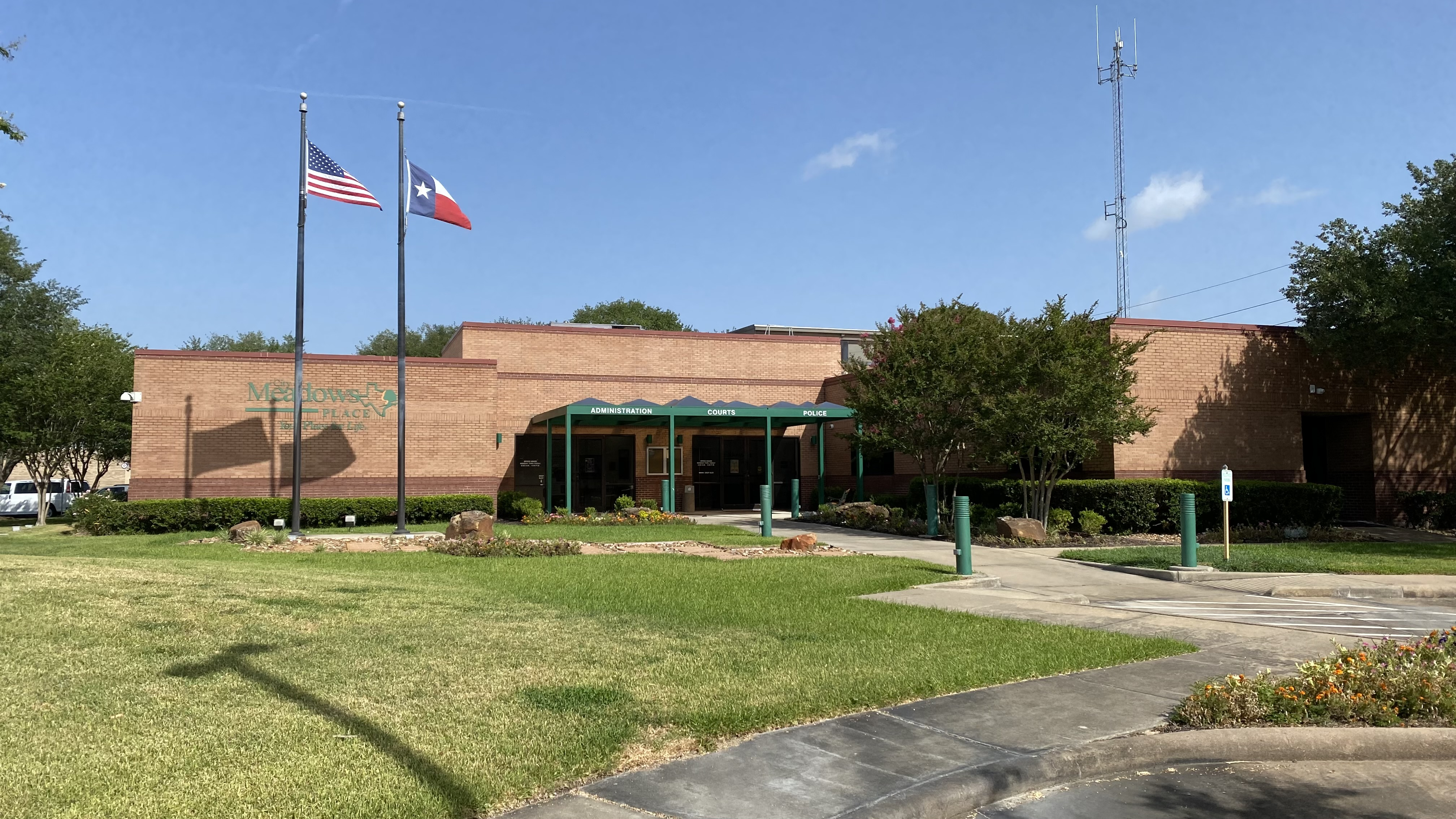
Meadows Place City Hall and Police Station

Meadows Place has a mayor-alderman form of government. The city council consists of the mayor and five aldermen.

Fort Bend County does not have a hospital district. OakBend Medical Center serves as the county's charity hospital which the county contracts with.

== Infrastructure ==
=== Water System ===
The City of Meadows Place operates its own water system consisting of three water wells around the city.

== Education ==
=== Primary and secondary schools ===
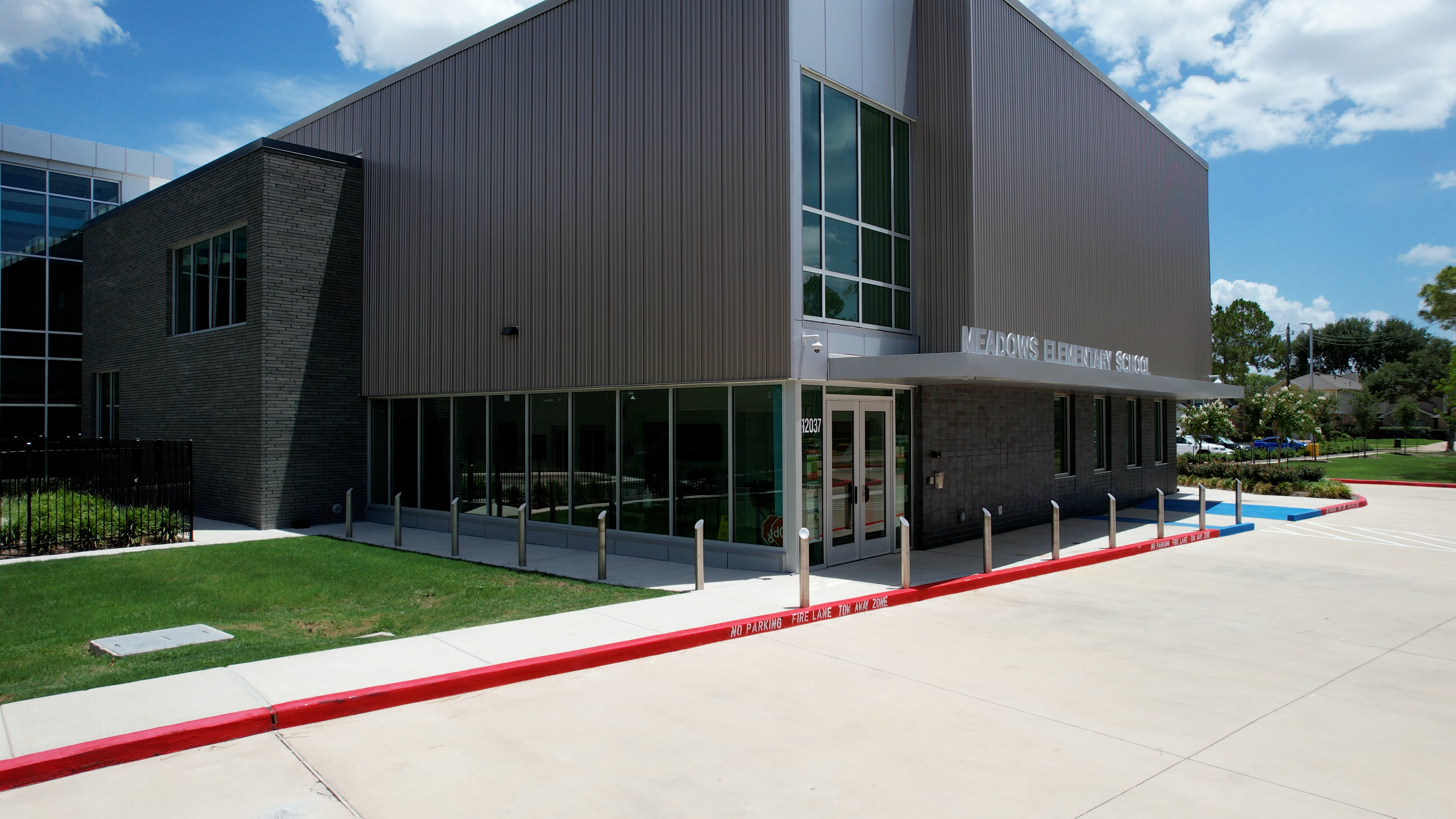
Meadows Elementary School

Meadows Place residents are within the Fort Bend Independent School District. Children attend Meadows Elementary School (located in the city of Meadows Place), Dulles Middle School (in Sugar Land), and Dulles High School (also in Sugar Land). Dulles Junior and Dulles High School were already built as Meadows Place opened. Meadows Elementary was occupied in August 1973. Dulles Junior High School reopened and was reoccupied in 1983.

In 2018 the FBISD administration proposed closing Meadows Elementary. In response parents from the community advocated for keeping the school open. An area resident quoted by KTRK-TV, stated that the members of the community believed that if Meadows Elementary was shut down, their property values would decline.

Sugar Grove Christian School, a preschool and elementary school, is in Meadows Place. It was founded in 1969, as the Sharpstown Christian School.

=== Colleges and universities ===
Community college facilities in proximity to Meadows Place are Houston Community College facilities and the Wharton County Junior College (HCC) facilities. Colleges and universities in proximity to Meadows Place include Houston Baptist University and the University of Houston Sugar Land campus.

The Texas Legislature specifies that the HCC boundary includes "the part of the Fort Bend Independent School District that is not located in the service area of the Wharton County Junior College District and that is adjacent to the Houston Community College System District." Wharton College's boundary within FBISD is defined only as the City of Sugar Land and the ETJ of Sugar Land, Meadows Place is in neither location. Meadows Place is in HCC.

== Parks and recreation ==
Meadows Place has six parks within the city: Mark McGrath Municipal Park, Jim McDonald Park, Brighton Lane Park, Meadow Glen Park, Meadow Valley Park, and Kangaroo Court Park.

The city also has a Discovery & Nature Center, that offers up-close experiences with several different species of animals. The center is open to residents and non-residents for a fee. It can also be rented for birthday parties and special occasions.

In addition, the city has a community center, community swimming pool, tennis courts, pickleball courts, baseball fields, splash pad, walking trails, and a running path. Both the community center and swimming pool are available for rental.

In 2011, the city built a lake complex in the middle of their park using Type 1 reclaimed water. This facility is used for fishing, hiking, and birdwatching year round. The lake is used as source of water for irrigation of city parks, saving the city money on subsidence fees. This project was recognized as the number two top environmental project in the State of Texas by Keep Texas Beautiful in 2012 and has had visitors from around the country.

== Gallery ==
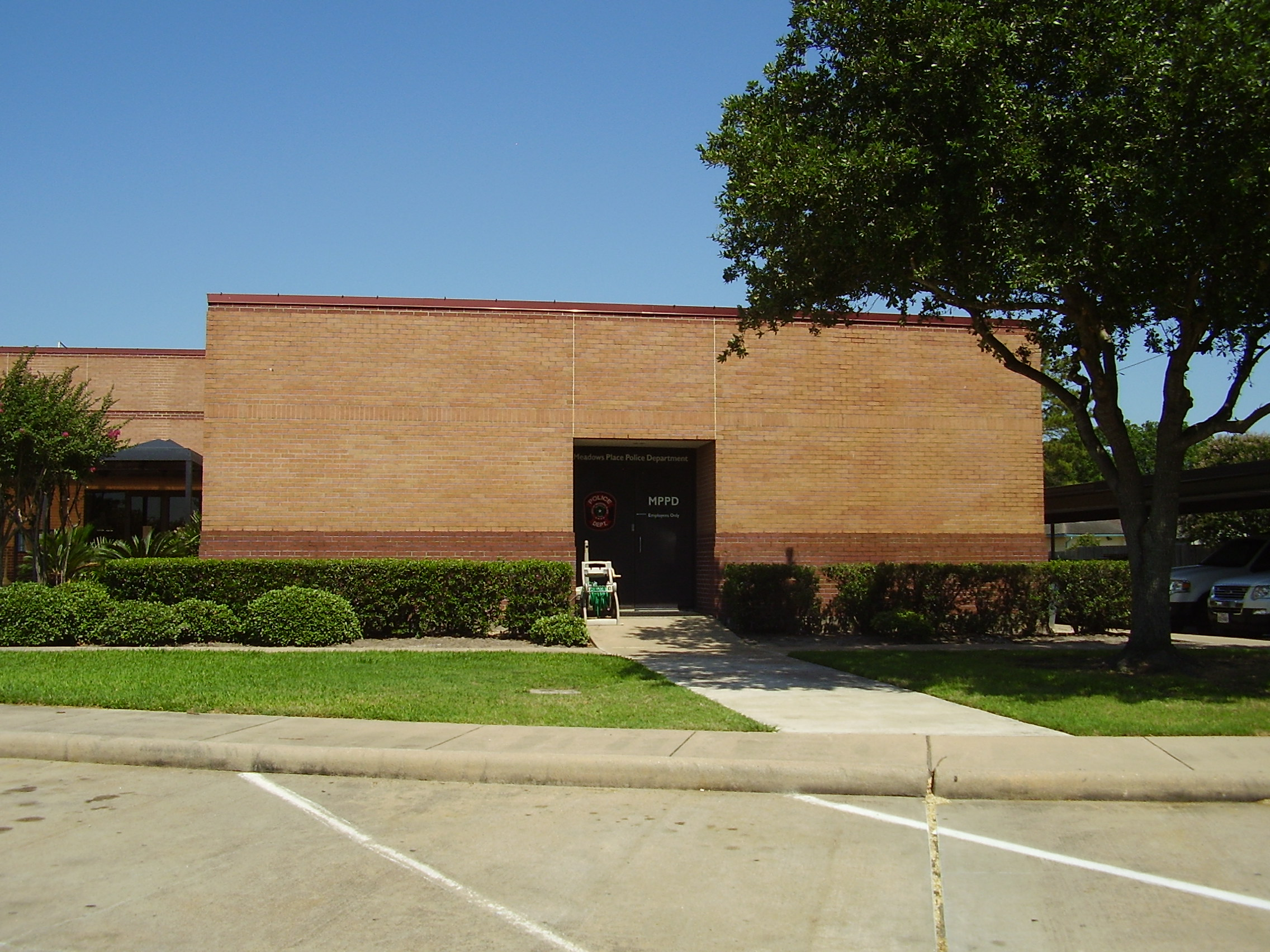
Meadows Place Police Department

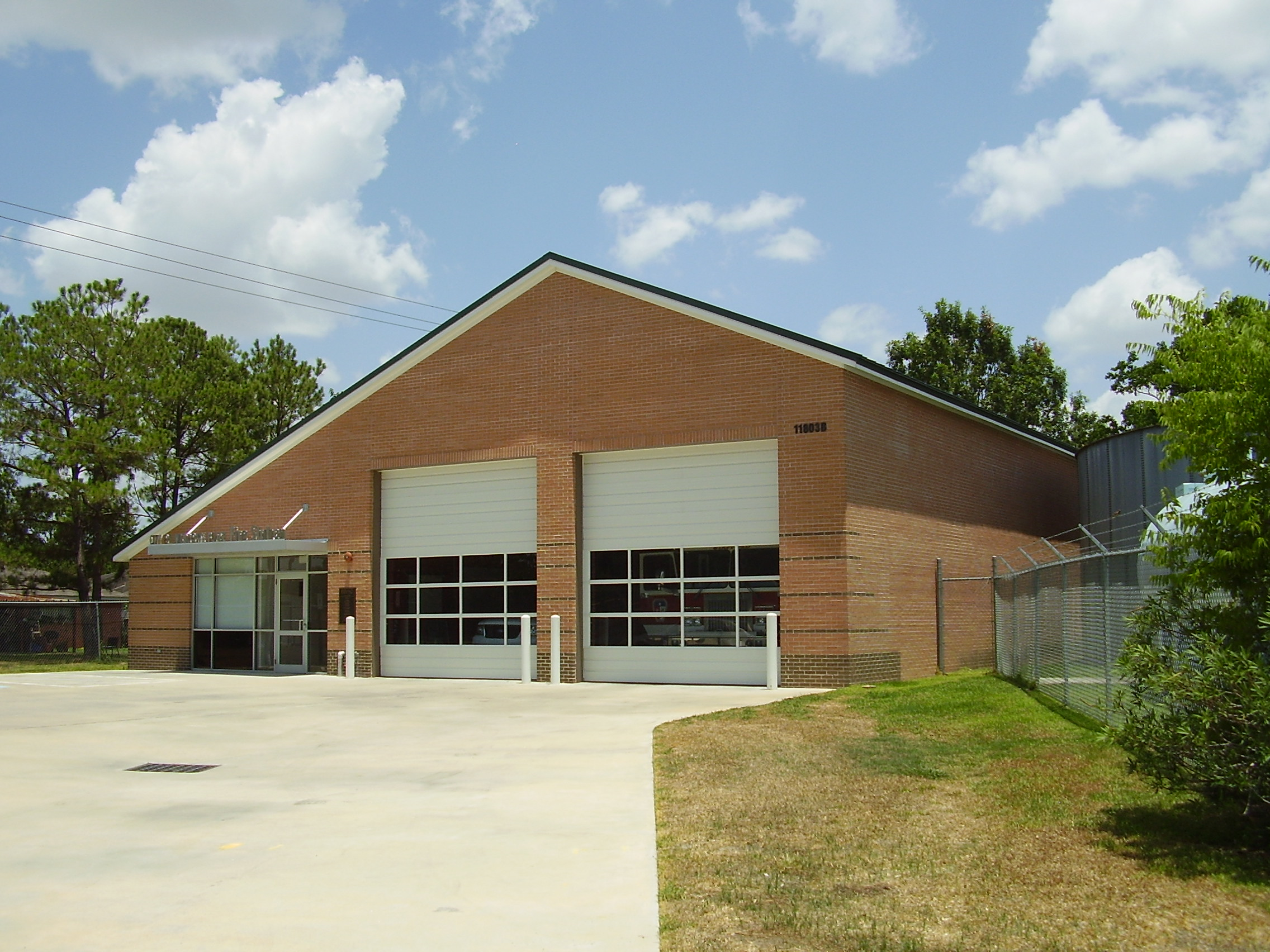
Meadows Place Fire Station

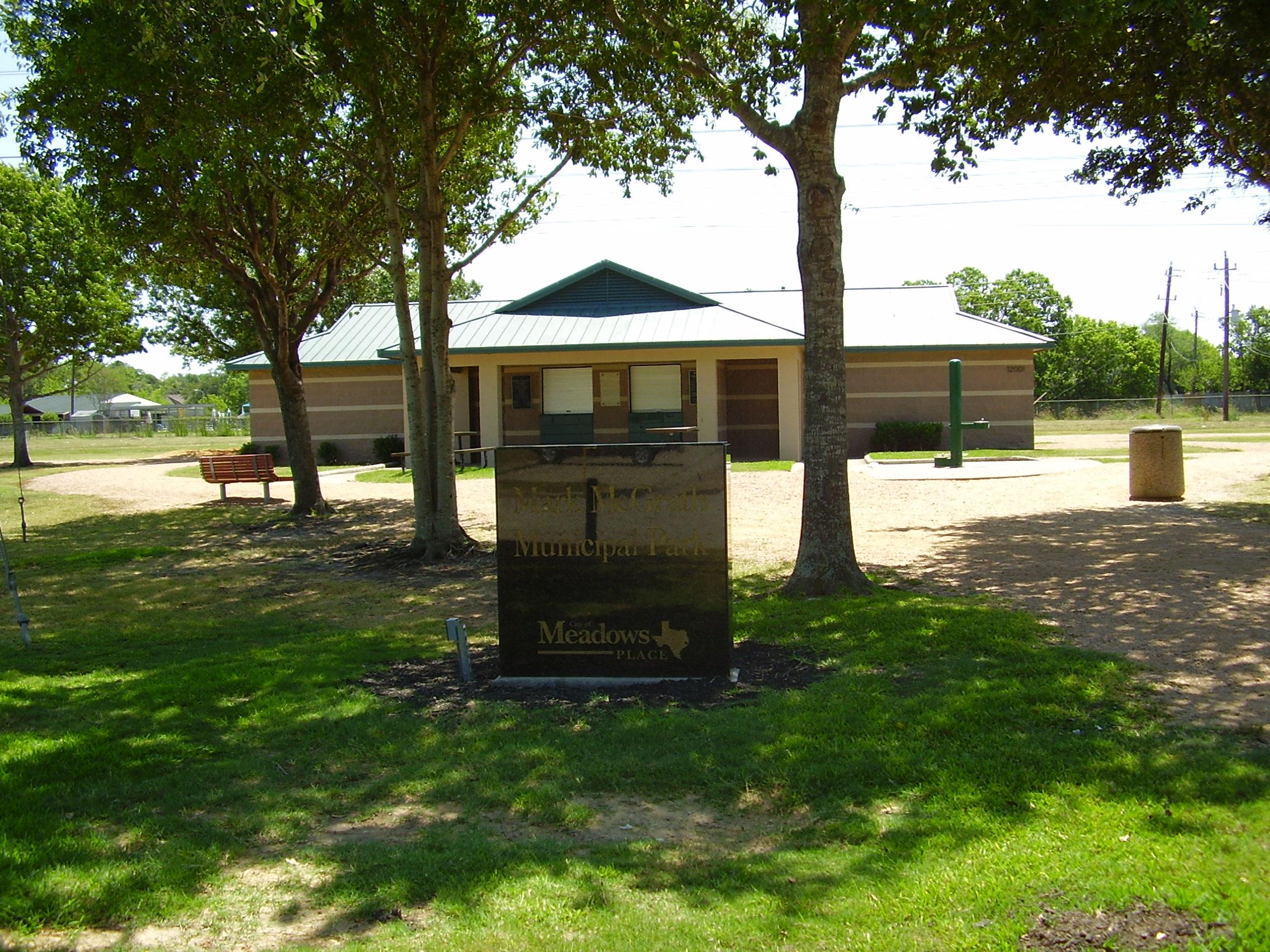
Mark McGrath Municipal Park

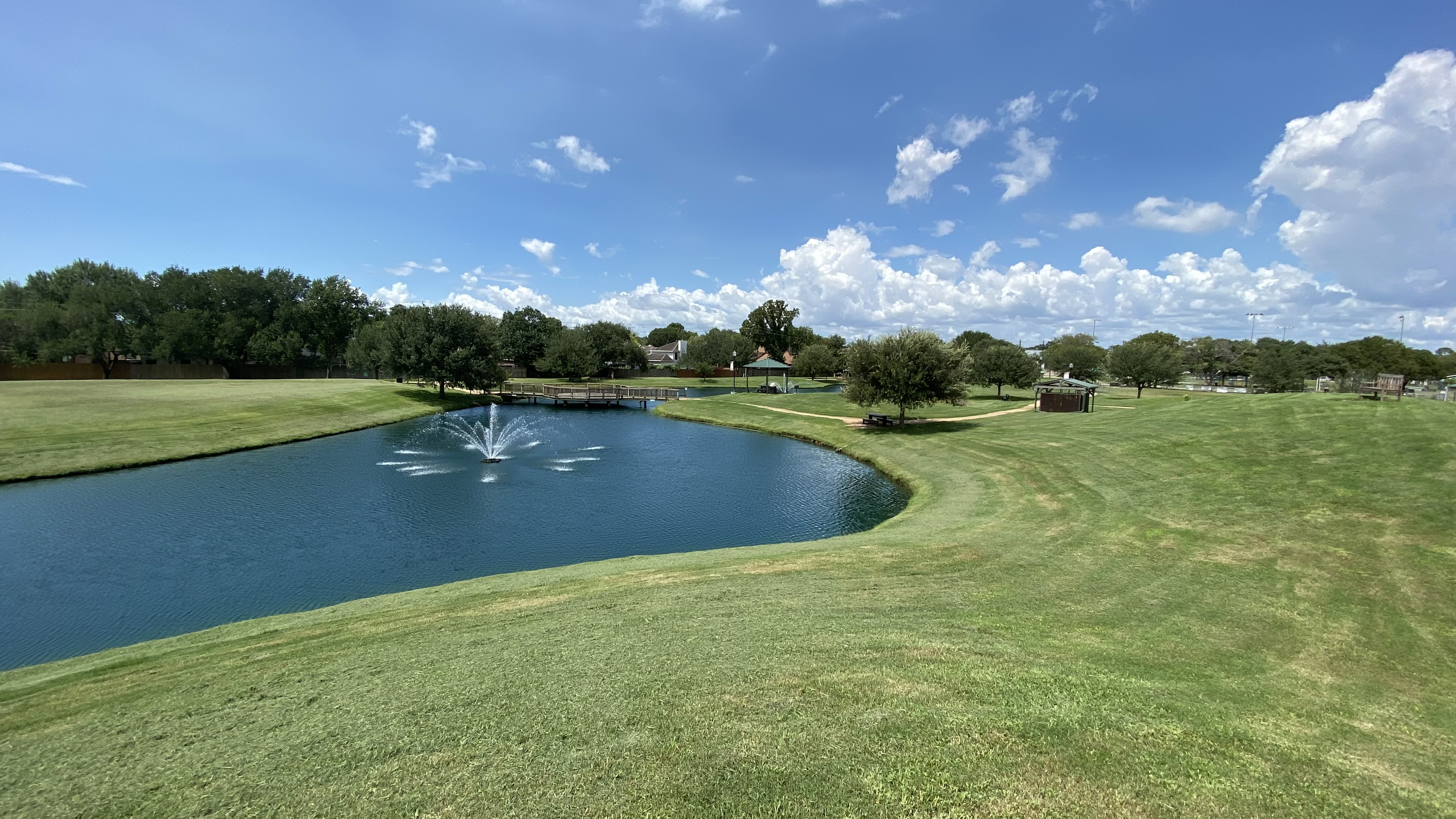
Mark McGrath Municipal Park

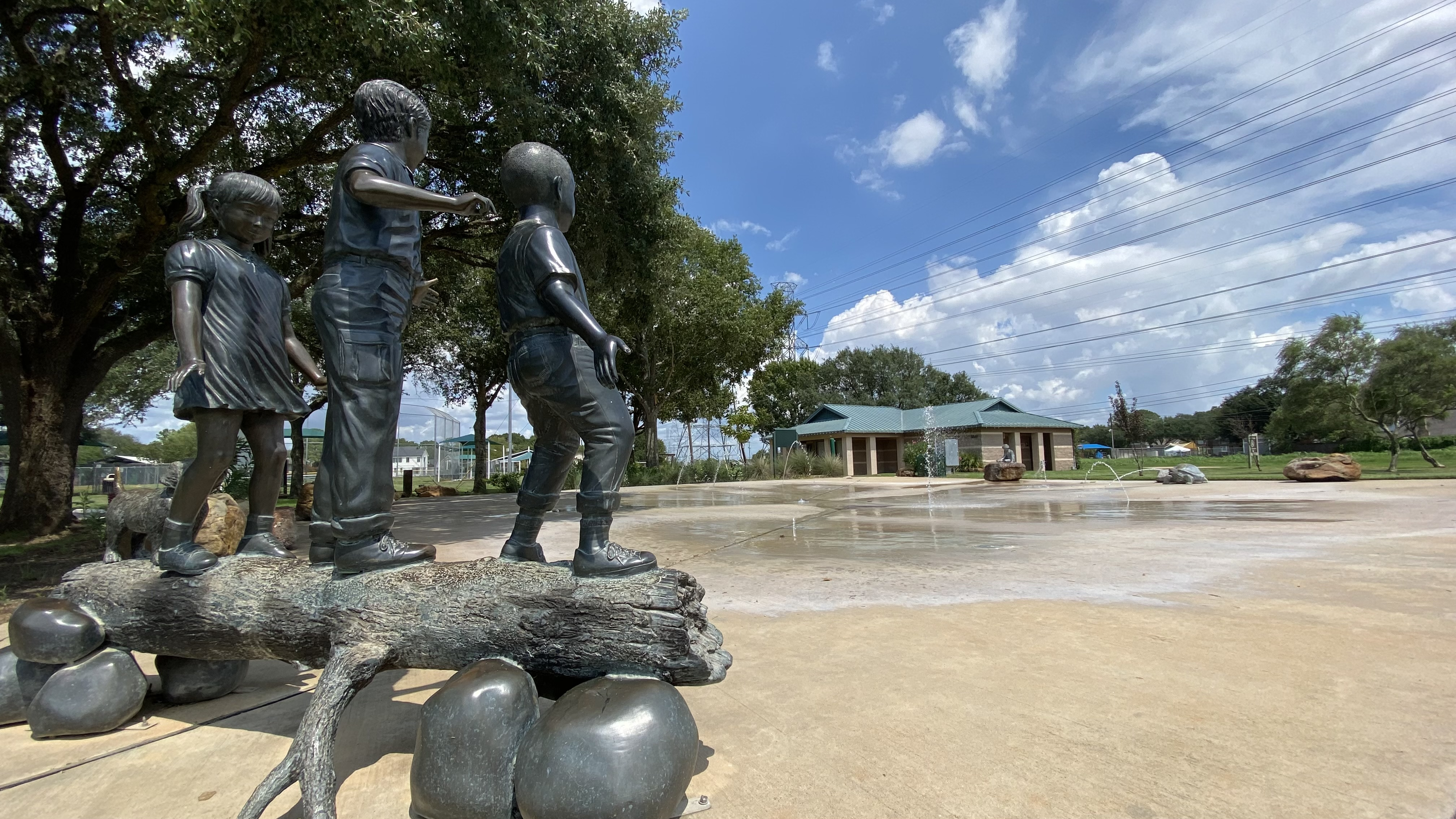
Mark McGrath Municipal Park Splash Pad

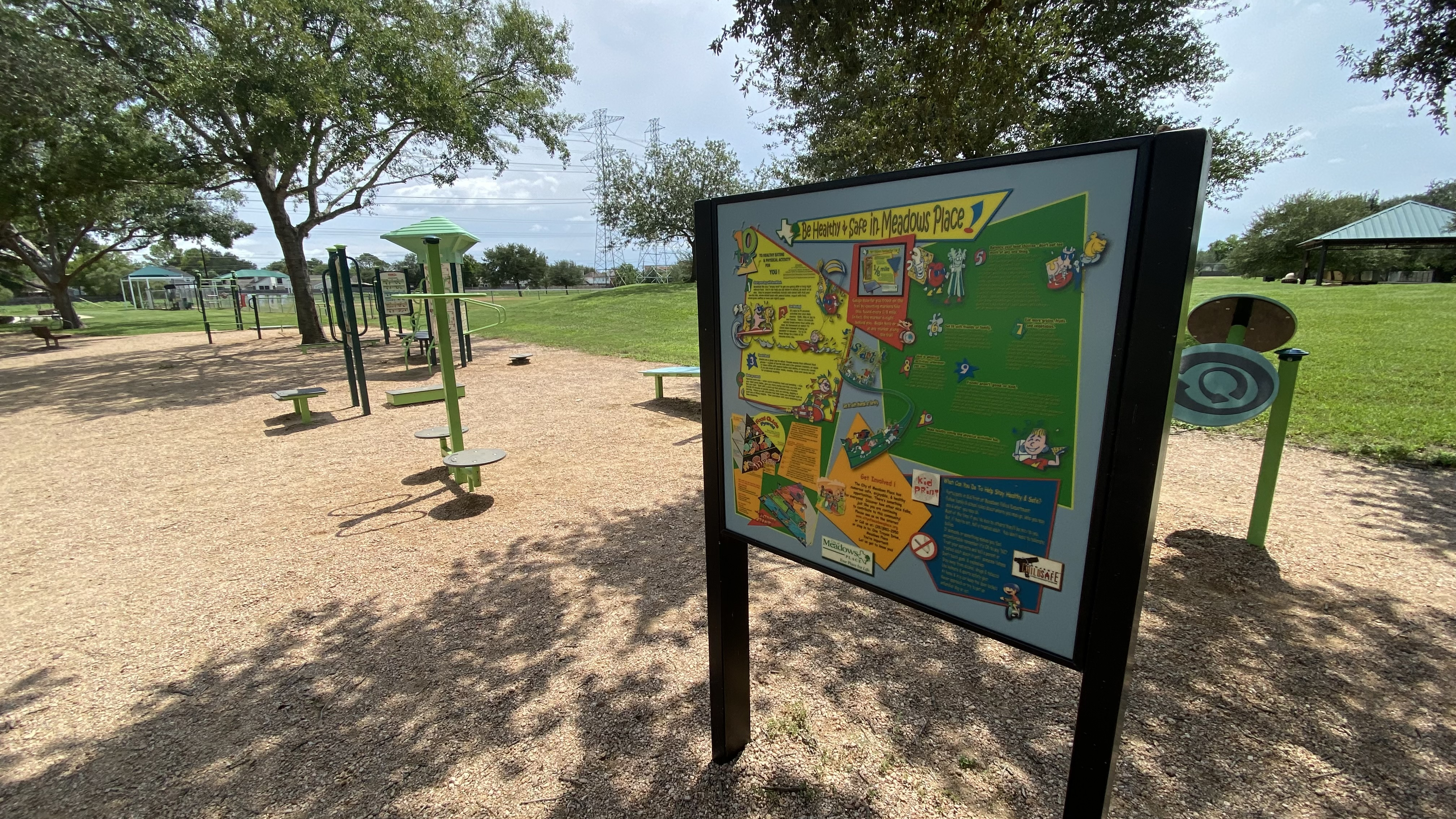
Mark McGrath Municipal Park

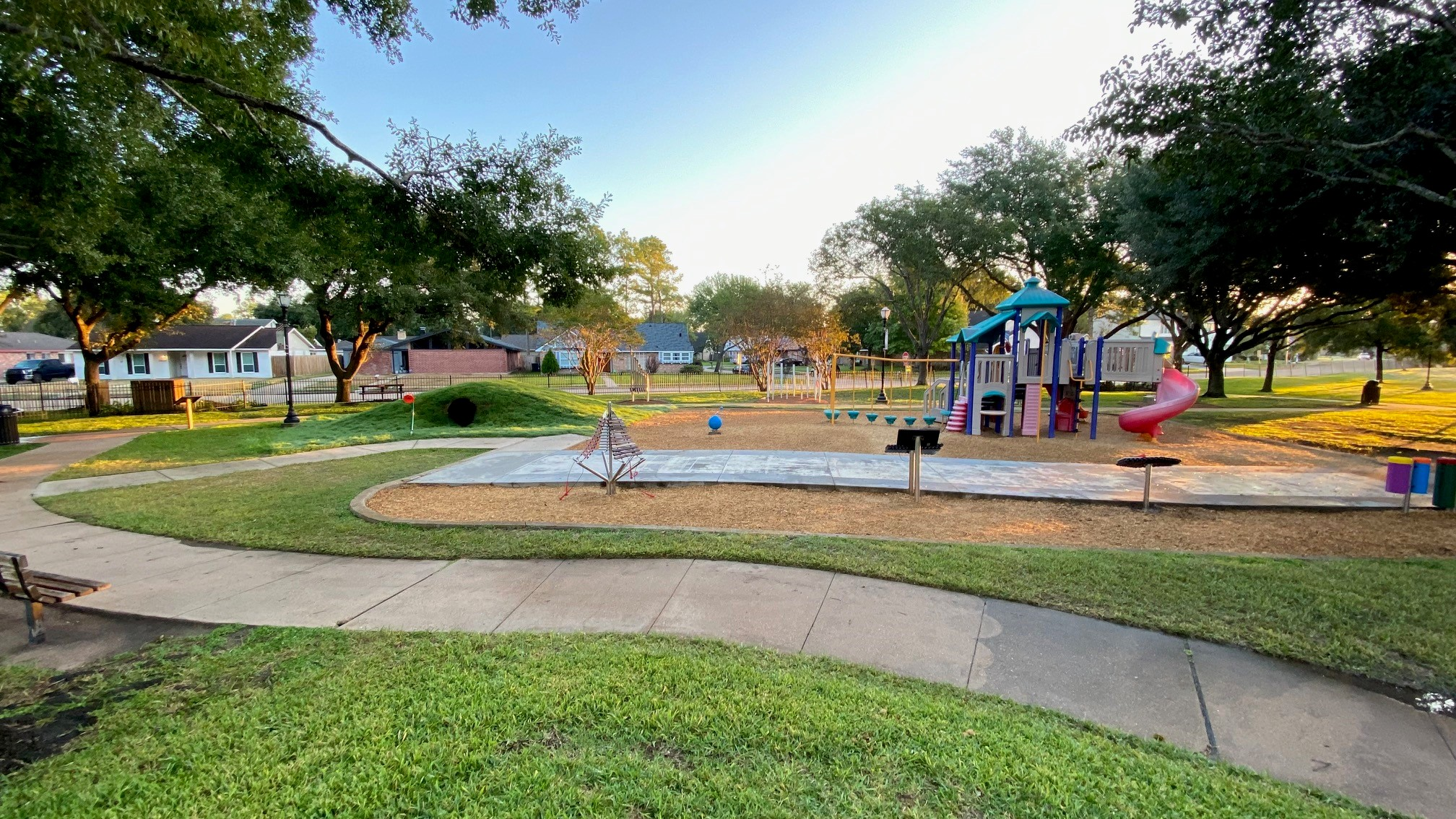
Jim McDonald Park (Includes Sensory Park

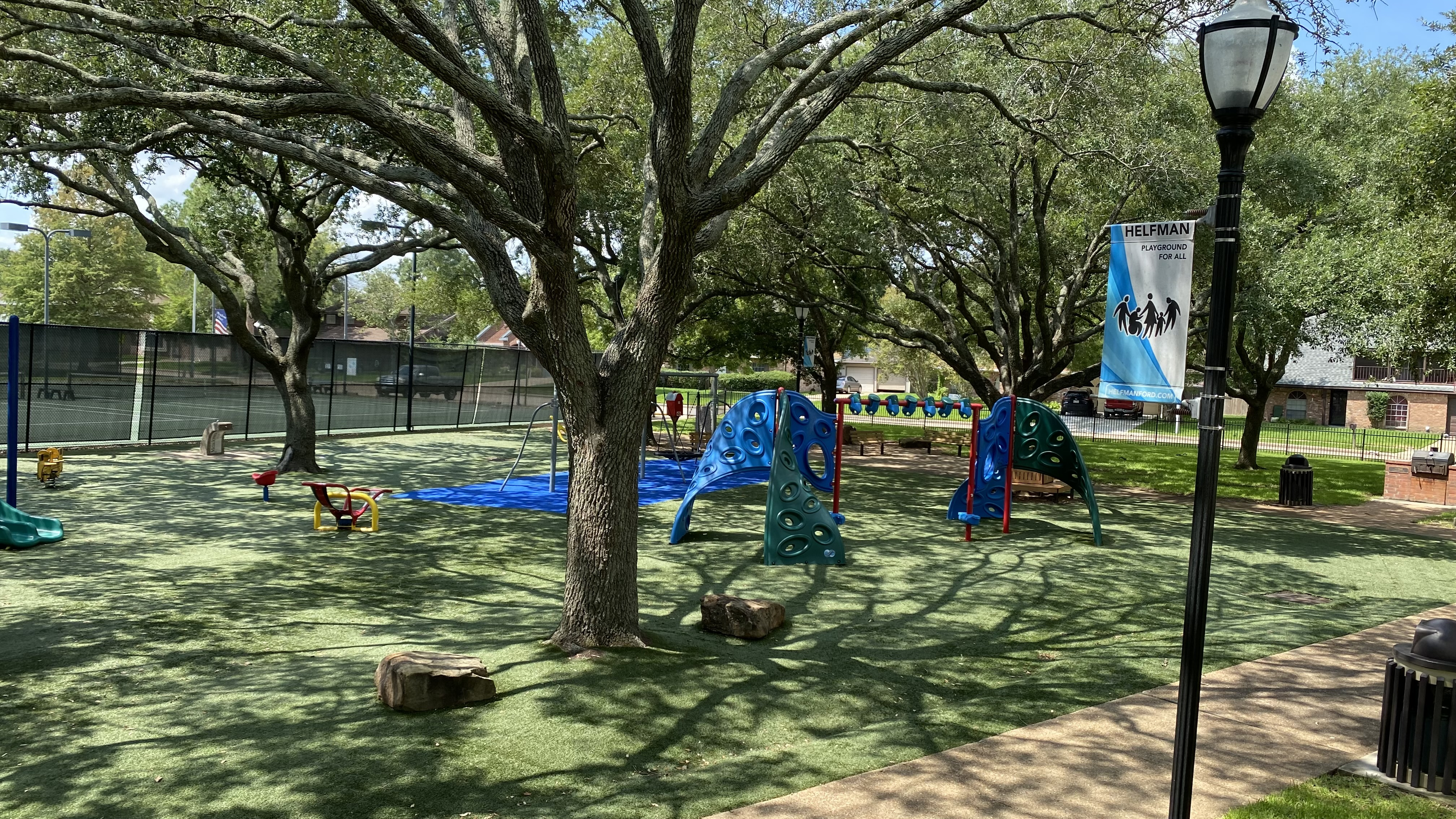
Helman Playground at Jim McDonald Park

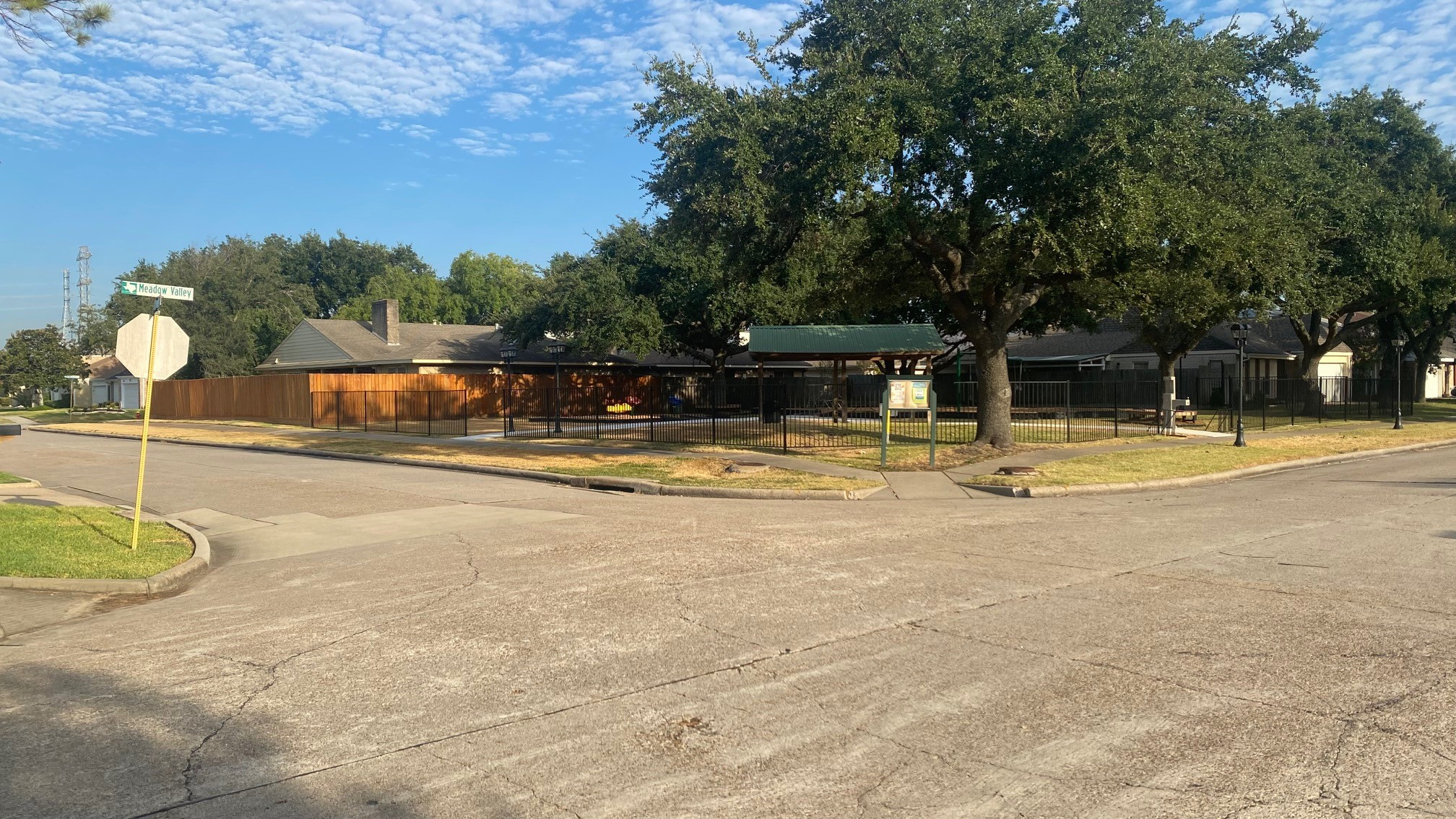
Meadow Valley Park

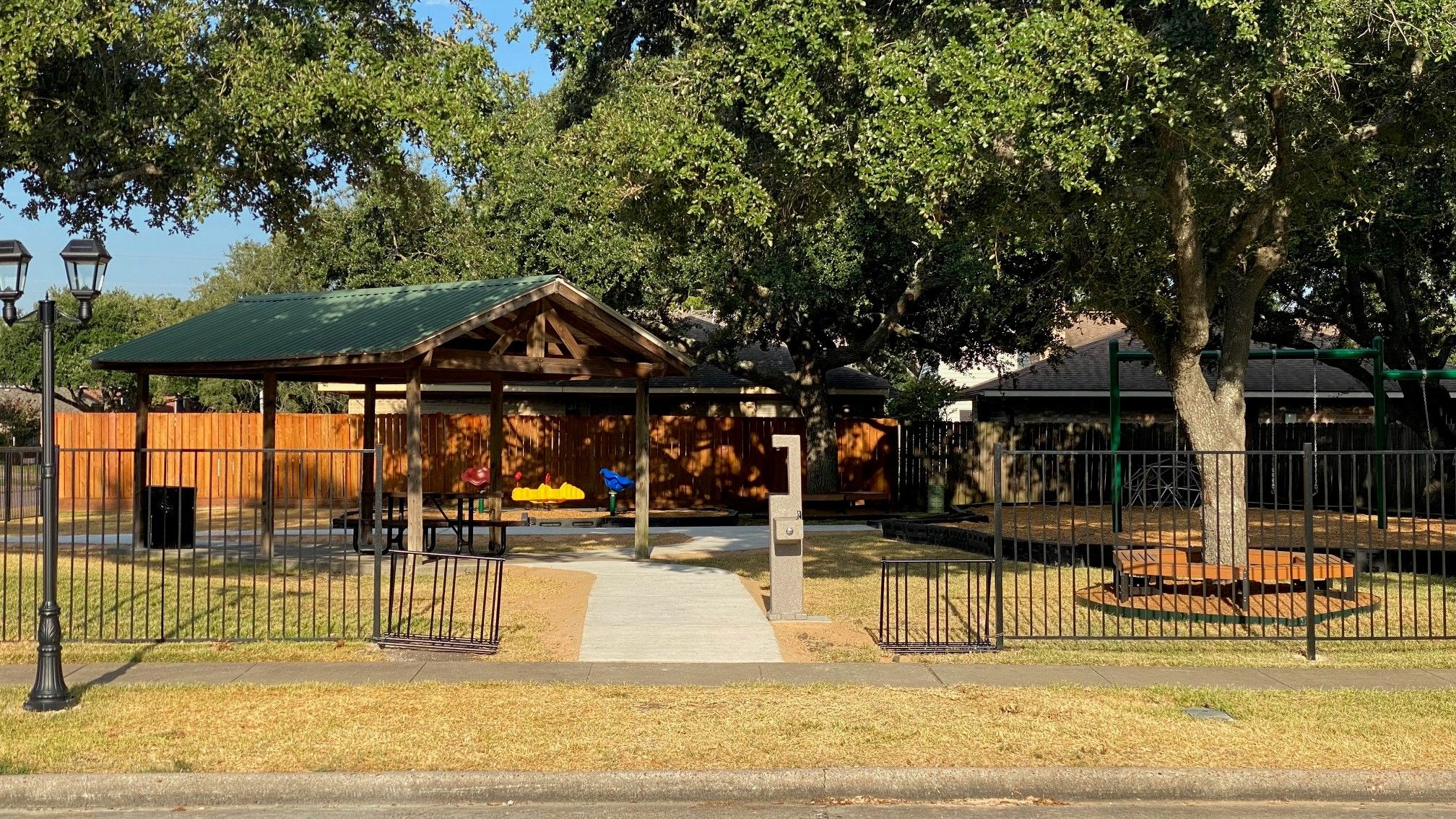
Meadow Valley Park

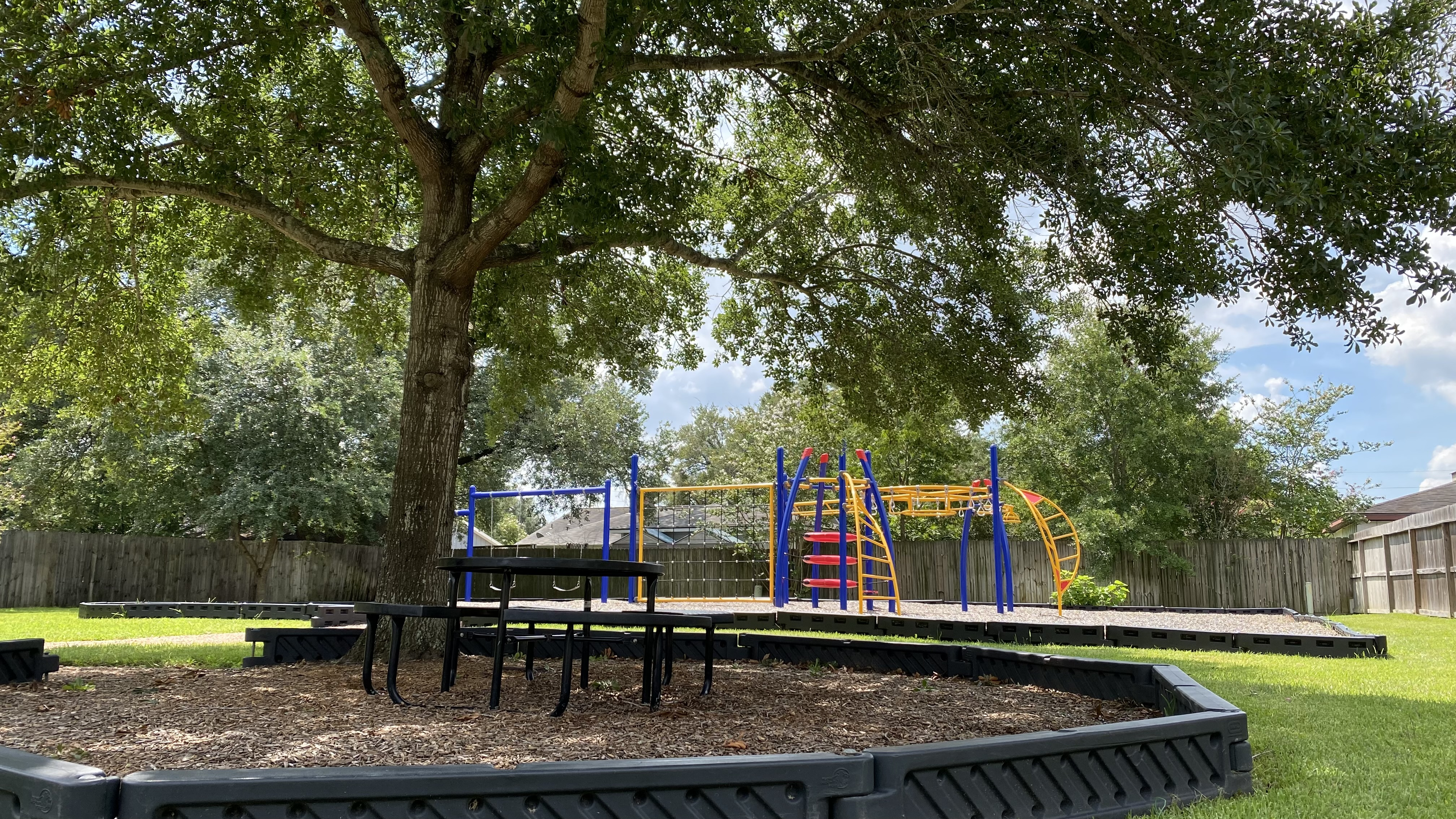
Brighton Lane Park

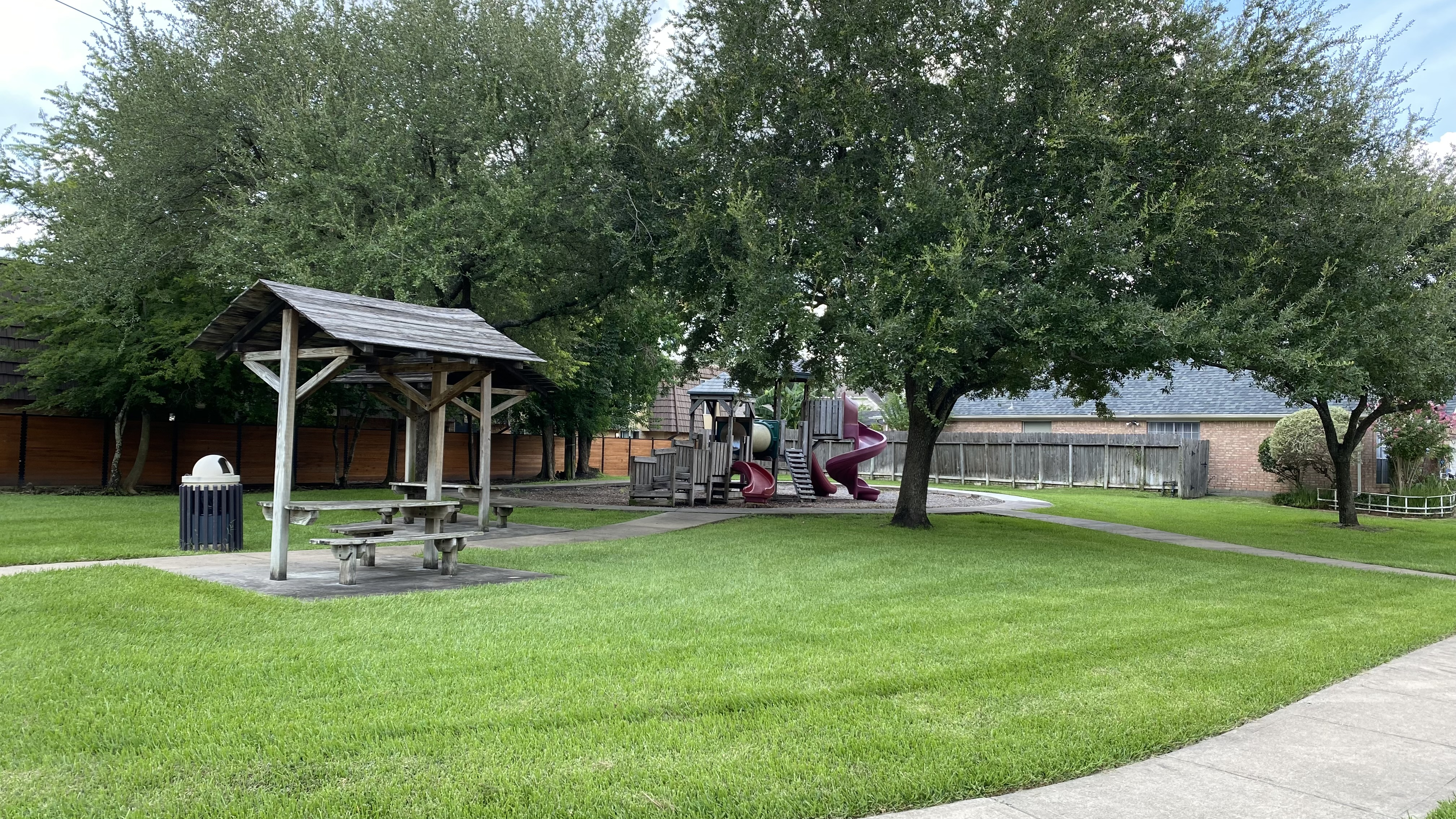
Meadow Glen Park

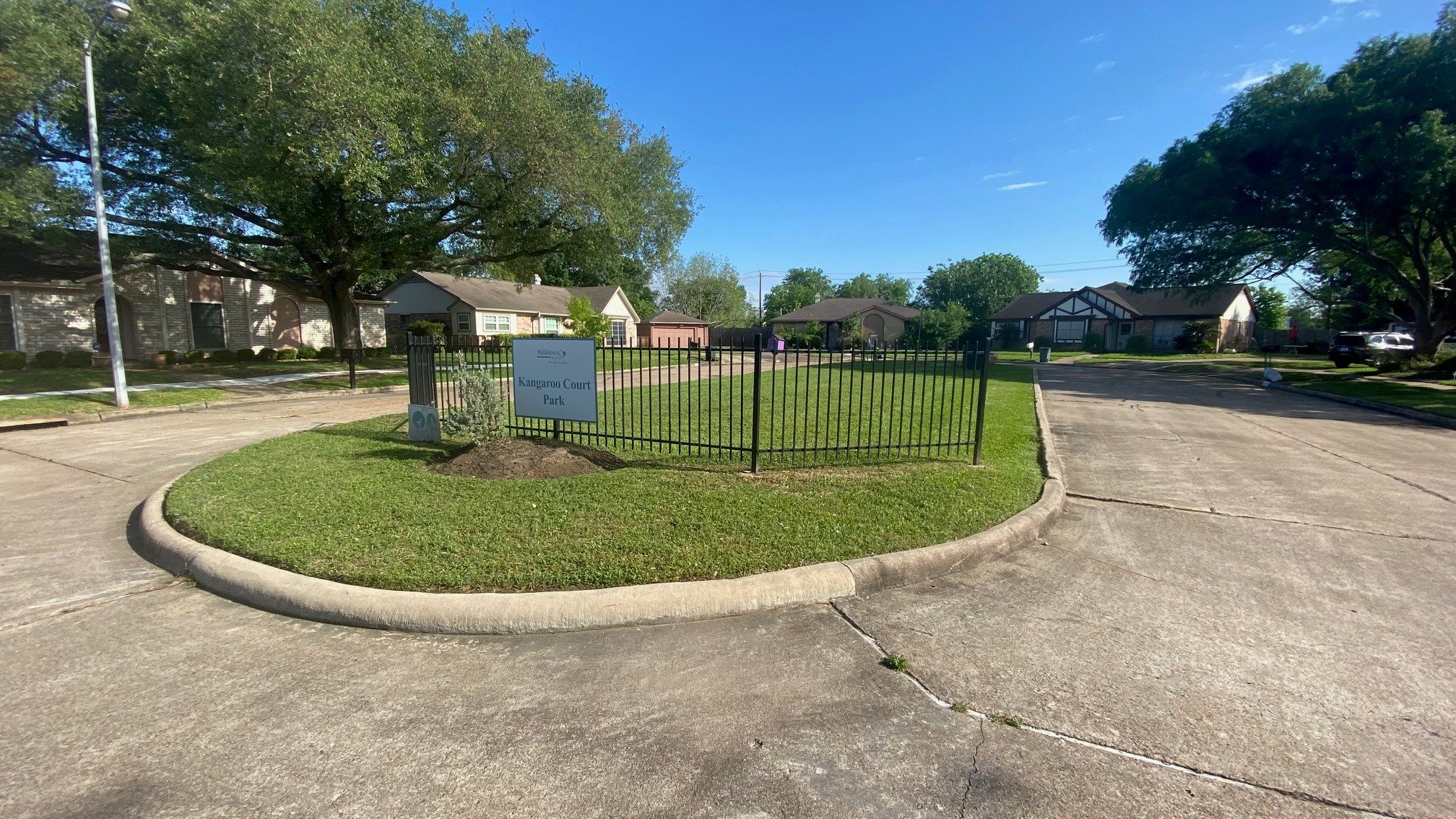
Kangaroo Court Park

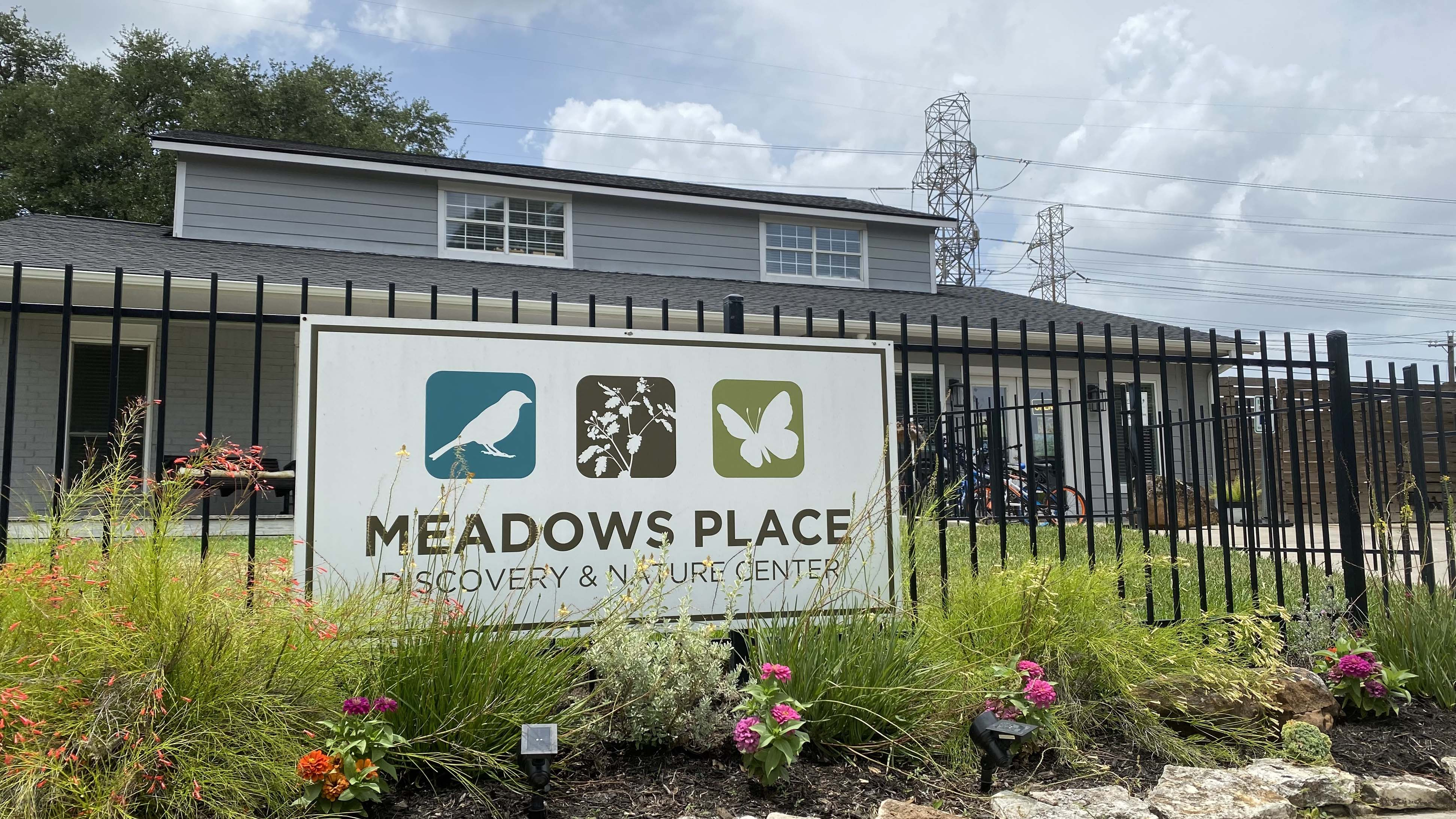
Discovery & Nature Center

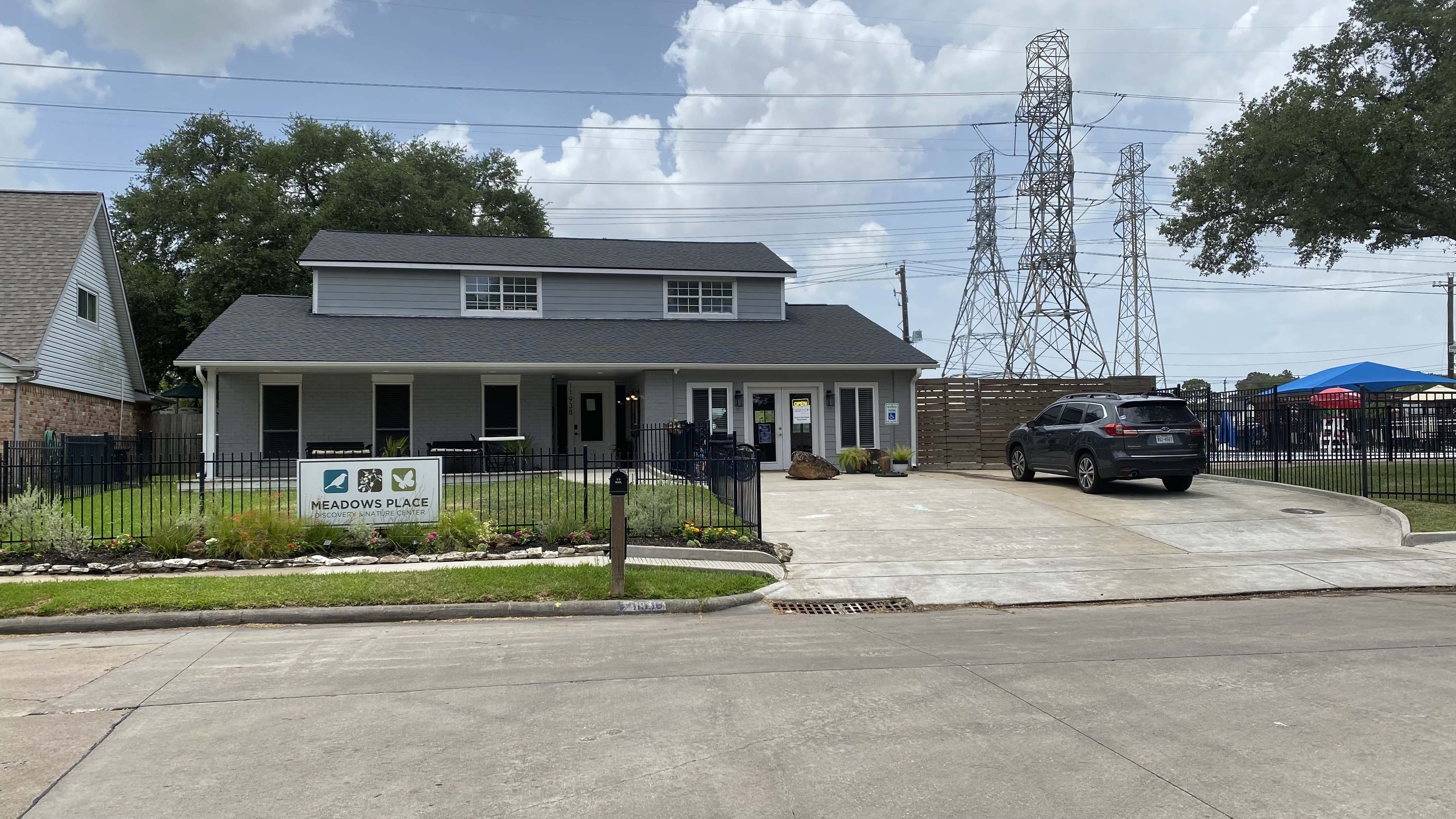
Discovery & Nature Center

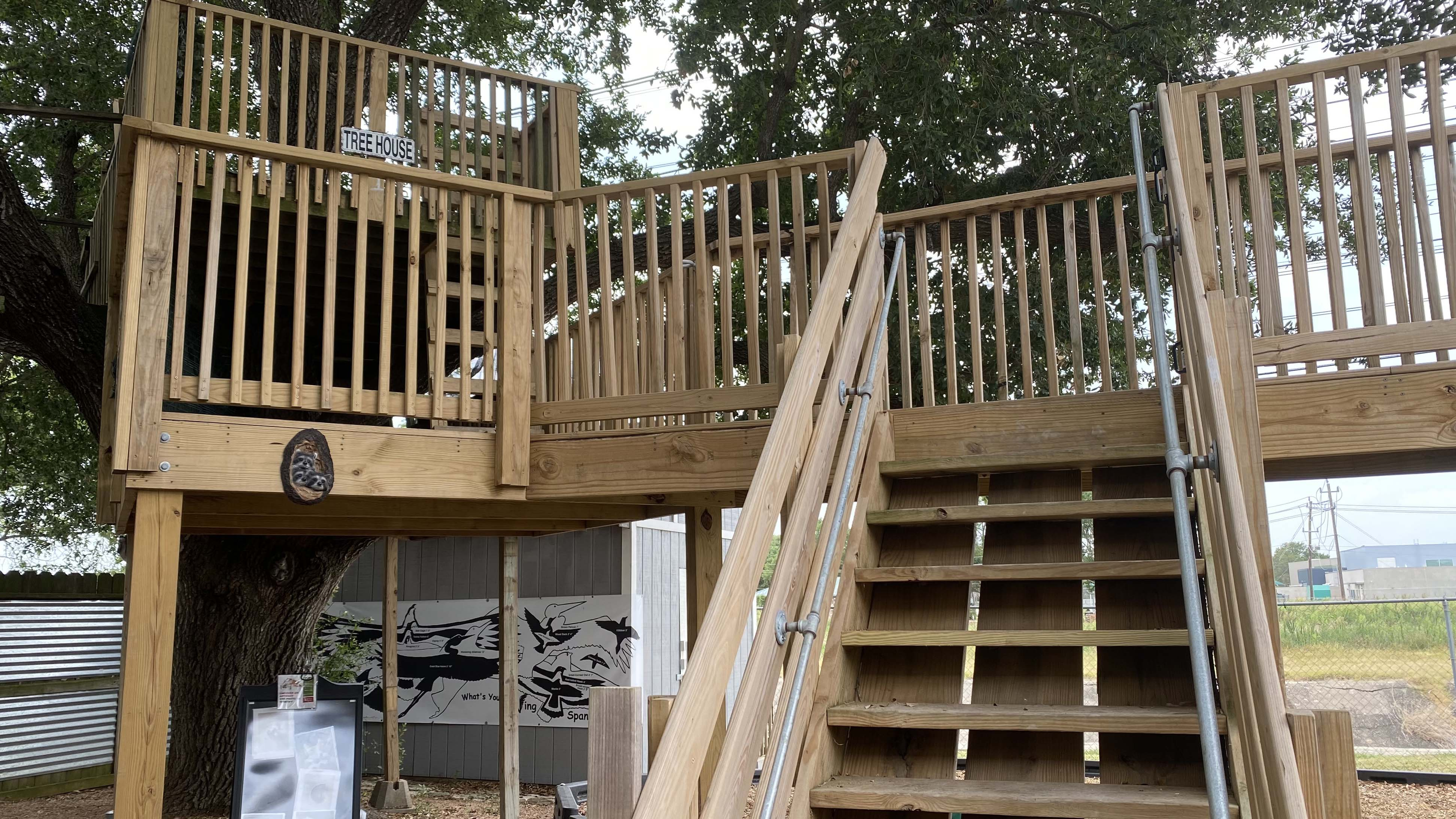
Discovery & Nature Center

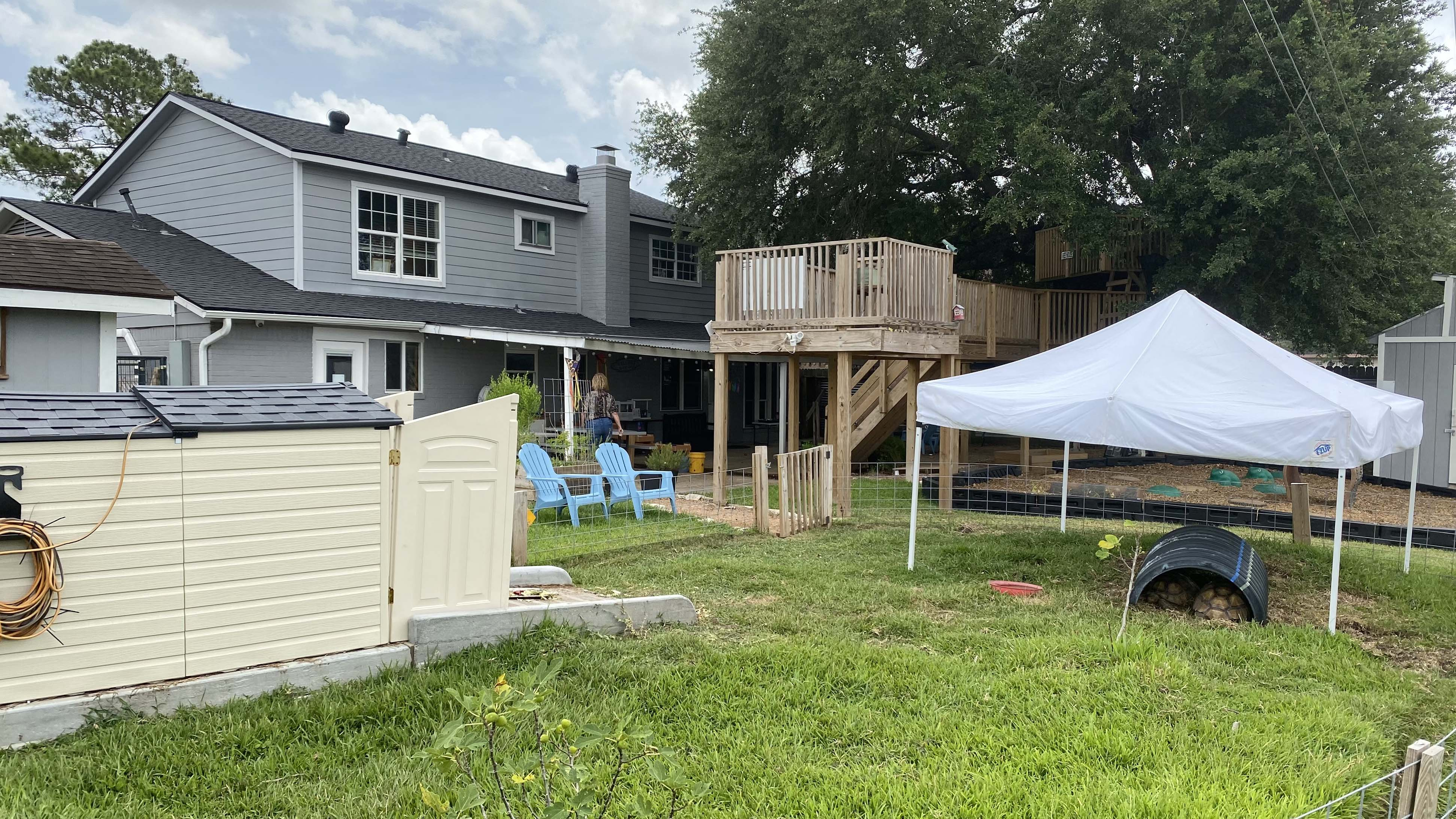
Discovery & Nature Center

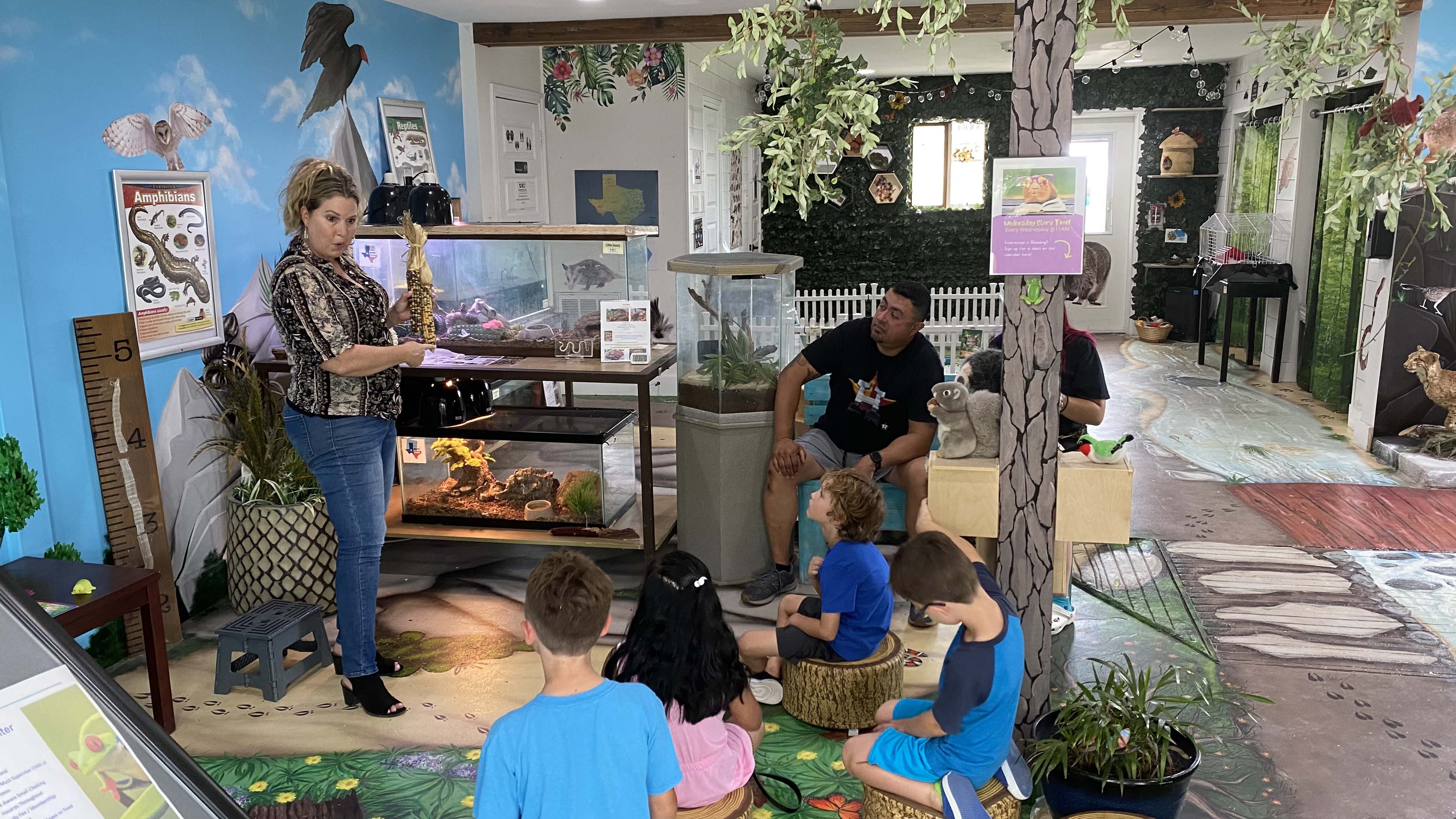
Discovery & Nature Center
