= 2013 Major League Baseball season =

2013 MLB season
- League: Major League Baseball
- Sport: Baseball
- Duration: March 31 – October 30, 2013
- Games: 162
- Teams: 30
- TV partner(s): Fox; TBS; ESPN; MLB Network

Draft
- Top draft pick: Mark Appel
- Picked by: Houston Astros

Regular season
- Season MVP: AL: Miguel Cabrera (DET); NL: Andrew McCutchen (PIT)

Postseason
- AL champions: Boston Red Sox
- AL runners-up: Detroit Tigers
- NL champions: St. Louis Cardinals
- NL runners-up: Los Angeles Dodgers

World Series
- Champions: Boston Red Sox
- Runners-up: St. Louis Cardinals
- World Series MVP: David Ortiz (BOS)

MLB seasons
- ← 2012 2014 →

Locations of AL teams for the 2013–2019 MLB seasons
West Central East
Locations of NL teams for the 2013–2016 MLB seasons
West Central East

The 2013 Major League Baseball season started on March 31 with a Sunday night game between the Texas Rangers and the Houston Astros. Opening Day for most clubs was a day later on April 1. The regular season ended on September 30, extended one day for a one-game playoff between the Tampa Bay Rays and the Texas Rangers to decide the second American League Wild Card winner.

The 2013 season was the first with the Houston Astros as a member of the American League (AL), playing in the West Division. This marked the first growth in the number of American League teams since the 1977 Major League Baseball expansion added the Seattle Mariners and Toronto Blue Jays. When the then-named Tampa Bay Devil Rays were added to the AL in 1998, the Milwaukee Brewers were reassigned to the National League (NL) the same year, keeping the AL at 14 teams. With the Astros' move to the AL, giving both leagues 15 teams, interleague play occurred throughout the entire season for the first time in MLB history.

The Major League Baseball All-Star Game's 84th edition was held on July 16 at Citi Field, home of the New York Mets, with the AL defeating the NL, 3–0. With the win, home field advantage at the World Series was awarded to the AL.

The season ended with the Boston Red Sox winning the World Series at Fenway Park for the first time since 1918, defeating the St. Louis Cardinals in six games. The Red Sox's victory recovered the city of Boston six months after the marathon bombing. This marked the last time a team clinched the World Series on their home field until 2022, where the Houston Astros won their second championship at Minute Maid Park.

== Standings ==
=== American League ===
AL East
Team	W	L	Pct.	GB	Home	Road
^{(1)} Boston Red Sox	97	65	.599	—	53‍–‍28	44‍–‍37
^{(5)} Tampa Bay Rays	92	71	.564	5½	51‍–‍30	41‍–‍41
New York Yankees	85	77	.525	12	46‍–‍35	39‍–‍42
Baltimore Orioles	85	77	.525	12	46‍–‍35	39‍–‍42
Toronto Blue Jays	74	88	.457	23	40‍–‍41	34‍–‍47

AL Central
Team	W	L	Pct.	GB	Home	Road
^{(3)} Detroit Tigers	93	69	.574	—	51‍–‍30	42‍–‍39
^{(4)} Cleveland Indians	92	70	.568	1	51‍–‍30	41‍–‍40
Kansas City Royals	86	76	.531	7	44‍–‍37	42‍–‍39
Minnesota Twins	66	96	.407	27	32‍–‍49	34‍–‍47
Chicago White Sox	63	99	.389	30	37‍–‍44	26‍–‍55

AL West
Team	W	L	Pct.	GB	Home	Road
^{(2)} Oakland Athletics	96	66	.593	—	52‍–‍29	44‍–‍37
Texas Rangers	91	72	.558	5½	46‍–‍36	45‍–‍36
Los Angeles Angels	78	84	.481	18	39‍–‍42	39‍–‍42
Seattle Mariners	71	91	.438	25	36‍–‍45	35‍–‍46
Houston Astros	51	111	.315	45	24‍–‍57	27‍–‍54

=== National League ===
NL East
Team	W	L	Pct.	GB	Home	Road
^{(2)} Atlanta Braves	96	66	.593	—	56‍–‍25	40‍–‍41
Washington Nationals	86	76	.531	10	47‍–‍34	39‍–‍42
New York Mets	74	88	.457	22	33‍–‍48	41‍–‍40
Philadelphia Phillies	73	89	.451	23	43‍–‍38	30‍–‍51
Miami Marlins	62	100	.383	34	36‍–‍45	26‍–‍55

NL Central
Team	W	L	Pct.	GB	Home	Road
^{(1)} St. Louis Cardinals	97	65	.599	—	54‍–‍27	43‍–‍38
^{(4)} Pittsburgh Pirates	94	68	.580	3	50‍–‍31	44‍–‍37
^{(5)} Cincinnati Reds	90	72	.556	7	49‍–‍31	41‍–‍41
Milwaukee Brewers	74	88	.457	23	37‍–‍44	37‍–‍44
Chicago Cubs	66	96	.407	31	31‍–‍50	35‍–‍46

NL West
Team	W	L	Pct.	GB	Home	Road
^{(3)} Los Angeles Dodgers	92	70	.568	—	47‍–‍34	45‍–‍36
Arizona Diamondbacks	81	81	.500	11	45‍–‍36	36‍–‍45
San Diego Padres	76	86	.469	16	45‍–‍36	31‍–‍50
San Francisco Giants	76	86	.469	16	42‍–‍40	34‍–‍46
Colorado Rockies	74	88	.457	18	45‍–‍36	29‍–‍52

== Postseason ==
=== Bracket ===
Wild Card Game (ALWC, NLWC)
4	Cleveland	0
5	Tampa Bay	1
4	Pittsburgh	1
5	Cincinnati	0

Division Series (ALDS, NLDS)
1	Boston	3
5	Tampa Bay	1
American League
2	Oakland	2
3	Detroit	3
1	St. Louis	3
4	Pittsburgh	2
National League
2	Atlanta	1
3	LA Dodgers	3

League Championship Series (ALCS, NLCS)
1	Boston	4
3	Detroit	2
1	St. Louis	4
3	LA Dodgers	2

World Series
AL1	Boston	4
NL1	St. Louis	2

== Rule changes ==
Several minor rule changes took effect during the 2013 season. These changes were approved by MLB owners; unless otherwise noted, they will also need the approval of the players' union.

- When visiting the pitcher's mound, managers and coaches are allowed to bring interpreters for the benefit of pitchers not fluent in English.
- Teams are allowed to have seven uniformed coaches in the dugout, up from six last season. This change came about after many teams hired second hitting coaches.
- The pickoff move in which a right-handed pitcher fakes to third base and throws to first base would be considered a balk. This rule had been approved by MLB's senior committee for the 2012 season, but the union voted against it pending further discussion. This change can be implemented for 2013 without the union's approval, but an ESPN report indicated that the owners hoped that the players would agree to the change.

== Managerial changes ==
=== Field managers ===
Team	Former manager	Interim manager	Reason for leaving	Story/Accomplishments
Philadelphia Phillies	Charlie Manuel	Ryne Sandberg	Fired	Manuel, who managed the Phillies to one of their most successful eras in recent memory, including five straight division championships, two pennants and the 2008 World Series Championship, was fired on August 16, and replaced for the remainder of the season by the Hall of Fame second baseman Ryne Sandberg. Sandberg was named the manager after signing a three-year contract on September 22.

==== Off-season ====
At the end of the 2012 season, the following teams made replacements to their managers.

Team	Former manager	Interim manager	Reason for leaving	New manager	Story/Accomplishments
Boston Red Sox	Bobby Valentine	—N/a	Fired	John Farrell	Valentine was dismissed from the Red Sox after one season on October 4, 2012. On October 21, the Red Sox officially announced Farrell as their new manager. Farrell was Boston's pitching coach from 2007 to 2010 and was manager of the Toronto Blue Jays from 2011 to 2012.
Cleveland Indians	Manny Acta	Sandy Alomar Jr.	Fired	Terry Francona	Acta was fired September 27, 2012, after three seasons with a record of 216-266 (.448). The Indians struggled throughout the second half of the 2012 season falling from playoff contention in July to the worst record in the American League. On October 6, the Indians hired Francona, who managed the Boston Red Sox from 2004 to 2011, and won World Series championships with the Red Sox in 2004 and 2007.
Colorado Rockies	Jim Tracy	—N/a	Resigned	Walt Weiss	Tracy resigned his post as manager after four seasons October 7, 2012. On November 7, 2012, the Rockies hired Walt Weiss as their new manager
Houston Astros	Brad Mills	Tony DeFrancesco	Fired	Bo Porter	On September 27, 2012, the Astros announced that the Washington Nationals third-base coach will become the manager of the Astros after the Nationals finish their postseason run.
Miami Marlins	Ozzie Guillén	—N/a	Fired	Mike Redmond	On October 23, 2012, the Marlins fired Guillén one season into a four-year $10 million contract. They finished with a 69–93 record. On November 1, 2012, the Marlins hired Mike Redmond as their new manager.
Toronto Blue Jays	John Farrell	—N/a	Traded to Red Sox	John Gibbons	On October 21, 2012, the Blue Jays officially announced that they had released Farrell from his contract in the same agreement that sent David Carpenter to the Red Sox in exchange for Mike Avilés. On November 20, 2012, Gibbons was named Blue Jays next manager.

== Scheduling changes ==
The Houston Astros' move to the American League West created two 15-team leagues each separated into three five-team divisions. With an odd number of teams in each league, interleague games were played nearly every day during the season, the only exception being when not every team had a game. For this season, each team played 20 interleague games (up from 15–18 games in 2012) in eight series. Each team played one three-game series against four teams from one division in the other league, and two two-game series (one home, one away) against the remaining team in that division (for 2013 the match-ups are AL East vs. NL West, AL Central vs. NL East, and AL West vs. NL Central, meaning the changes of the Astros and the small increase in interleague play will not affect the yearly rotation, also the Astros played all their former NL Central rivals in 2013). The remaining four games were played against a team's "natural rival" in two back-to-back two-game series from May 27–30. Teams played in one city May 27 and 28, then traveled to the other city for games on May 29 and 30. It was the first season that every team has an interleague rivalry, according to the table below, with new rivalries for the season shown in italics.

AL East	NL East	AL Central	NL Central	AL West	NL West
Red Sox	Phillies	White Sox	Cubs	Mariners	Padres
Yankees	Mets	Indians	Reds	Angels	Dodgers
Blue Jays	Braves	Tigers	Pirates	Athletics	Giants
Rays	Marlins	Twins	Brewers	Rangers	Diamondbacks
Orioles	Nationals	Royals	Cardinals	Astros	Rockies

The remaining 142 games will be played within the league. Each team will play its four division rivals 19 times (up from 15–18 in 2012) for a total of 76 games. Each team will play either 6 or 7 games against the ten teams in the two other divisions in its league, for a total of 66 games. In 2012, these season series ranged anywhere from five to ten games, creating large disparities between teams' strengths of schedule.

Aside from the natural rivalries, teams from the same division will play the same opponents for roughly the same number of games. The only variation occurs in interleague match-ups (either 3 or 4 games) and same-league interdivision match-ups (either 6 or 7 games).

== League leaders ==
=== American League ===
Hitting leaders
Stat	Player	Total
AVG	Miguel Cabrera (DET)	.348
OPS	Miguel Cabrera (DET)	1.078
HR	Chris Davis (BAL)	53
RBI	Chris Davis (BAL)	138
R	Mike Trout (LAA)	109
H	Adrián Beltré (TEX)	199
SB	Jacoby Ellsbury (BOS)	52

Pitching leaders
Stat	Player	Total
W	Max Scherzer (DET)	21
L	Lucas Harrell (HOU)	17
ERA	Aníbal Sánchez (DET)	2.57
K	Yu Darvish (TEX)	277
IP	James Shields (KC)	228.2
SV	Jim Johnson (BAL)	50
WHIP	Max Scherzer (DET)	0.970

=== National League ===
Hitting leaders
Stat	Player	Total
AVG	Michael Cuddyer (COL)	.331
OPS	Paul Goldschmidt (AZ)	.952
HR	Pedro Álvarez (PIT); Paul Goldschmidt (AZ)	36
RBI	Paul Goldschmidt (AZ)	125
R	Matt Carpenter (STL)	126
H	Matt Carpenter (STL)	199
SB	Eric Young Jr. (COL/NYM)	46

Pitching leaders
Stat	Player	Total
W	Adam Wainwright (STL); Jordan Zimmermann (WSH)	19
L	Edwin Jackson (CHC)	18
ERA	Clayton Kershaw (LAD)	1.83
K	Clayton Kershaw (LAD)	232
IP	Adam Wainwright (STL)	241.2
SV	Craig Kimbrel (ATL)	50
WHIP	Clayton Kershaw (LAD)	0.915

== Milestones ==
=== Batters ===
- Bryce Harper (WSH):
  - Became the youngest player in Major League history to hit two home runs in the first game of the season by hitting his home runs off of the Miami Marlins' Ricky Nolasco.
  - With his double in the second inning on September 15 against the Philadelphia Phillies, Harper got his 100th career extra-base hit. He becomes the fifth player in Major League history to have at least 100 extra-base hits through his age-20 season, joining Mel Ott (142), Phil Cavarretta (108), Tony Conigliaro (105) and Alex Rodriguez (104).
  - With his home run in the first inning on September 19 against the Miami Marlins, Harper became the second player in Major League history to have two 20-homer seasons before turning 21 years old, joining former Boston Red Sox outfielder Tony Conigliaro (1964–1965).
- Todd Frazier/Zack Cozart (CIN):
  - Each player hit two home runs in the Reds' win on April 5 against the Washington Nationals to become the first starting shortstop and third baseman to have a multiple-homer game in franchise history.
- Chris Davis (BAL):
  - Became just the fourth player in Major League history to start the season off with four homers in as many games.
  - With his 20th double on June 5 against the Houston Astros, Davis, in the Orioles 58th game of the season, became the fastest player in Major League history to reach 20 homers and 20 doubles in a season. He broke the record of 60 games held by Mel Ott in 1929 and Iván Rodríguez in 2000.
  - With his 28th home run of the season on June 25 against the Cleveland Indians, Davis broke the team record for most home runs by the end of June. Brady Anderson set the mark in 1996.
  - With his 30th home run of the season on June 29 against the New York Yankees, Davis became the eighth player in Major League history to have 30 homers before the end of June.
  - Became the second player in Major League history to have at least 30 home runs and 90 RBIs before the All-Star Break with his four RBI performance on July 14. Davis had 37 home runs and 93 RBIs at the break.
  - His 37th home run on July 14 against the Toronto Blue Jays tied him with Reggie Jackson for the most by an American League player before the All-Star break.
  - With his double on September 11 against the New York Yankees, Davis became the first player in Orioles' franchise history to hit 40 home runs and 40 doubles in a season.
  - Set the franchise record with his 51st home run against the Boston Red Sox on September 17. He broke the team record that was set in 1996 by Brady Anderson. He finished the season with 53 home runs.
- Albert Pujols (LAA):
  - Recorded his 1000th career extra-base hit with a double in the fifth inning against the Oakland Athletics on April 10. He became the 36th player to reach this mark and with the fifth fewest at-bats.
- Chris Davis (BAL)/John Buck (PIT)/(NYM):
  - With 19 RBI, Buck and Davis have tied a Major League record for most RBIs in a team's first ten games of a season, established by Lou Gehrig for the 1927 Yankees and tied by Manny Ramirez for the Indians in 1999.
- Aaron Hicks (MIN):
  - With his 20 strikeouts in his first ten games of his career, Hicks tied a Major League record for most strikeouts by a rookie through his first ten career games. He tied the record that was set in 2012 by Brett Jackson.
- B.J. Upton/Justin Upton (ATL):
  - Became the second pair of brothers to hit back-to-back home run in Major League history in the fifth inning against the Colorado Rockies on April 23. They join the Waner brothers, Lloyd and Paul, who did it on September 15, 1938.
- John Buck (PIT)/(NYM):
  - With his ninth home run on April 29 against the Miami Marlins, Buck tied the Major League record for most home runs by a catcher before the end of April. He tied the record set by Johnny Bench in 1971 and Charles Johnson in 2001.
- Juan Pierre (MIA):
  - Recorded his 600th stolen base by stealing third base in the first inning against the Philadelphia Phillies on May 2. He became the 18th player to reach that mark.
- Mike Trout (LAA):
  - Became the youngest player in American League history to hit for the cycle on May 21 against the Seattle Mariners.
  - Became the youngest player in Major League history to record two consecutive seasons of at least 20 home runs and 30 stolen bases. He set this record at the age of 22 years, 26 days with his stolen base against the Tampa Bay Rays on September 2.
  - Became the youngest player in Major League history to have a season with at least 100 walks, at least 70 extra-base hits and at least 30 steals after drawing his 100th walk on September 15 against the Houston Astros.
- John Mayberry Jr. (PHI):
  - Became the first player in Major League history to hit two home runs in extra innings in one game, including a walk-off grand slam on June 4 against the Miami Marlins.
- Carlos Gonzalez/Troy Tulowitzki (COL):
  - Gonzalez hit three home runs and Tulowitzki went 5–for–5 with two homers in the Rockies win over the Cincinnati Reds on June 5. It's the first time in Major League history that one player had a three-homer game while a teammate had at least five hits including two homers in the same game.
- Yasiel Puig (LAD):
  - Became the second player in modern Major League history (since 1900) to hit four home runs in his first five big-league games on June 7.
  - At the completion of June 19, Puig has played 15 games in his major league career and he has had at least two hits in 10 of those games. Among players who made their major league debut since 1900 only one other had 10 multiple-hit games in his first 15 career games: Baltimore's Curtis Goodwin in 1995. Goodwin had at least two hits in 10 of his first 11 major league games. Puig also has 27 hits and five homers in his 15-game major league career. Puig is the first player in baseball's modern era (since 1900) to have that many hits and home runs in his first 15 major league games.
  - At the completion of June 24, Puig has played 20 games in his major league career and he has notched 34 hits and seven home runs. Puig became the first player in Major League with at least that many hits and home runs in his first 20 career games.
  - For the month of June, Puig (who debuted June 3) improved his batting average to .436 (44–for–101). That is the highest average for any player in baseball's modern era (1900 to date) in the calendar month of his major-league debut (minimum: 60 at-bats). Only one other player who debuted in the majors since 1900 collected as many hits during his first calendar month in the big leagues as Puig. That was Joe DiMaggio, who went 48–for–126 (.381) in May 1936.
  - Became the first player to win the Player of the Month award in their first month of their career.
  - Won both the National League Rookie of the Month and the National League Player of the Month in the month of June, becoming the fifth player to win both awards for the same month.
- Domonic Brown (PHI):
  - With this 20th home run of the season on June 25 against the San Diego Padres, Brown became the eighth different Phillies player to reach the 20-homer mark by the end of June, but at age 25 he is the youngest player to do so for the Phillies.
- Aramis Ramírez (MIL):
  - On June 26 against the Chicago Cubs, he got his 2000th career hit with a home run in the second inning. He became the 273rd player to reach this mark.
- Anthony Rendon (WSH):
  - With his three hits on June 26 against the Arizona Diamondbacks, Rendon has 35 hits in 99 career at-bats. He has tied the Montreal/Washington franchise record for most career hits within a player's first 100 major-league at-bats. Coco Laboy, a member of the Expos' inaugural 1969 team, started his big-league career 35 for 100. In his 100th at-bat (June 27), Rendon failed to get a hit.
- Michael Cuddyer (COL):
  - Set the franchise record for the longest single-season hitting streak – 24 games – with a single in the second inning against the New York Mets on June 27. He broke the record that was set by Dante Bichette in 1995. Cuddyer's streak ended at 27 games on July 2.
- Miguel Cabrera (DET):
  - With his four hit, two home run game on June 28 against the Tampa Bay Rays, Cabrera became the first player in the modern era (since 1900) to go 4–for–4 or better with multiple homers in three games in a single season.
  - Became the first player in Major League history to have at least 30 home runs and 90 RBIs before the All-Star Break. Cabrera had 30 home runs and 95 RBIs at the break.
  - With his 100th RBI on August 6, Cabrera became the sixth player in Major League history to reach triple digits in RBIs in ten (or more) successive seasons, joining Jimmie Foxx (13, 1929–41), Lou Gehrig (13, 1926–38), Alex Rodriguez (13, 1998–2010), Al Simmons (11, 1924–34) and Albert Pujols (10, 2001–10).
- David Ortiz (BOS):
  - Tied Harold Baines on July 9 against the Seattle Mariners for most hits by a designated hitter in a career with 1688. He set the new record the following night with a double against the Mariners.
  - Recorded his 2000th career hit with a double in the sixth inning on September 4 against the Detroit Tigers. He became the 275th player to reach this mark.
- Manny Machado (BAL):
  - Became the youngest player in Major League history to collect at least 125 hits before the All-Star break by collecting three hits against the Texas Rangers on July 10. He broke the record that was set in 1962 by Tommy Davis of the Los Angeles Dodgers, who was 23 when he had 126 hits at the break.
  - With his 50th double against the Toronto Blue Jays on September 14, Machado became the second-youngest player to reach 50 doubles in one season. Machado reached that milestone 70 days past his 21st birthday. In 1996, Alex Rodriguez hit his 50th double of the season 43 days after he turned 21 years old.
- Brandon Barnes (HOU)/Brad Miller (SEA):
  - On July 19 the Mariners' Miller homered twice, while the Astros' Barnes went 5–for–5 and hit for the cycle. It was the first time in Major League history that one rookie hit two home runs and another hit for the cycle in the same game.
- Jason Giambi (CLE):
  - Became the oldest player in Major League history to hit a walk-off home run against the Chicago White Sox on July 28. Giambi, 202 days past his 42nd birthday, is 45 days older than Hank Aaron was when he hit his 754th career home run.
  - Recorded his 2000th career hit with a single in the ninth inning on September 8 against the New York Mets. Giambi became the oldest player (age 42) at the time of his admission into the 2000-hit club. He became the 276th player to reach this mark.
- Alfonso Soriano (NYY)/(CHC):
  - After recording seven RBI against the Los Angeles Angels of Anaheim on August 14, he became the third player to record at least six RBI in two consecutive games, joining Rusty Greer (1997 Rangers) and Geoff Jenkins (2001 Brewers). Soriano had six RBI the previous game.
  - Recorded his 400th career home run against the Toronto Blue Jays on August 27. He became the 51st player to reach this mark.
  - With his multi-homer game on September 10 against the Baltimore Orioles, Soriano became the second player in Major League history to have at least three multi-homer games for two different teams in the same season. The other player to accomplish this was Mark McGwire in 1997.
- Ichiro Suzuki (NYY):
  - With a single in the first inning against the Toronto Blue Jays on August 21, Suzuki collected his 4000th career hit between the Major Leagues and Japan. He has 1278 hits in nine seasons in Japan. Pete Rose with 4256 hits and Ty Cobb with 4191 are the only two players that have reached the number solely in the major leagues.
- Shane Victorino (BOS):
  - Became the first player in Red Sox history to go 3–for–3 or better with at least two homers, four runs scored and seven RBI in a game against the Baltimore Orioles on August 28.
- Robinson Canó (NYY):
  - Set the Major League record for most double-and-homer games as a second baseman for one team with his 47th such game on August 31 against the Baltimore Orioles. He broke the record that was held by Bobby Doerr of the Boston Red Sox.
- Todd Helton (COL):
  - Recorded his 2500th career hit with a double in the seventh inning against the Cincinnati Reds on September 1. He became the 96th player to reach this mark.
- Matt Adams (STL):
  - Became the first player in Major League history to hit two home runs in the 14th inning or later in one game on September 4 against the Cincinnati Reds.
- Billy Hamilton (CIN):
  - With his stolen base on September 7 against the Los Angeles Dodgers, Hamilton, who had not yet come to the plate in a Major League game, was the first player in the modern era (since 1900) to record a stolen base in each of his first four MLB contests.
  - Recorded four stolen bases in his first career start on September 18 against the Houston Astros. He became the first player in the live-ball era (since 1920) to have at least four stolen bases in his first career start.
- Mark Trumbo (LAA):
  - Went 5–for–5 with four extra-base hits and five runs scored on September 10 against the Toronto Blue Jays. Trumbo became the ninth player (first in franchise history) in modern Major League history to go 5–for–5 or better with that many extra-base hits and runs scored in one game.
- Mike Carp (BOS):
  - With his pinch-hit grand slam in the 10th inning against the Tampa Bay Rays on September 11, Carp became the first in Red Sox' history to hit a pinch-hit home run with the bases loaded in extra innings.
- Alex Rodriguez (NYY):
  - Hit his Major League record 24th grand-slam home run in the seventh inning against the San Francisco Giants on September 20. He broke the tie that he had with Lou Gehrig.
- Raúl Ibañez (SEA):
  - By hitting his 29th home run on September 21 against the Los Angeles Angels of Anaheim, he tied the Major League record for homers in a season by a player age 40 or older. Ibanez, who celebrated his 41st birthday on June 2, matched the mark set by Ted Williams, who set the record in 1960 when he turned 42.

=== Pitchers ===
==== No-hitters ====
- Homer Bailey (CIN):
  - Threw the 16th no-hitter in Reds history by defeating the San Francisco Giants 3–0 on July 2. This was Bailey's second career no-hitter. Bailey walked one batter, Gregor Blanco in the seventh inning to lose his perfect game bid, while throwing 109 pitches. Bailey became the first pitcher since fellow Texan Nolan Ryan in 1974 and 1975 to throw two no-hitters without another big league pitcher accomplishing the feat between his.
- Tim Lincecum (SF):
  - No-hit the San Diego Padres on July 13 by a 9–0 score at Petco Park, making it the first no-hitter ever pitched in that stadium. Lincecum struck out 13 batters and threw 148 pitches. Lincecum was the losing pitcher in Homer Bailey's no-hitter on July 2 and becomes the first pitcher to throw a no-hitter and be on the losing end of a no-hitter during the same season since Juan Marichal in 1963. The 13 strikeouts are the second-most by a Giant in pitching a no-hitter, after the 14 in Matt Cain's perfect game in 2012. This was Lincecum's first career no-hitter.
- Henderson Álvarez (MIA):
  - No-hit the Detroit Tigers on the last game of the regular season (September 29) as the Marlins won 1–0. The Marlins won the game in the bottom of the ninth inning on a wild pitch by Tigers' reliever Luke Putkonen.

==== Other accomplishments ====
- Texas Rangers:
  - Became the first team since 1900 to allow no runs and register 15 or more strikeouts in consecutive games. They accomplished this feat against the Houston Astros on April 2 and 3.
- Washington Nationals:
  - Became the 13th team since 1900 to start the season with two consecutive shutouts by blanking the Miami Marlins on April 1 and 3.
- Joe Nathan (TEX):
  - Recorded his 300th career save by closing out a 5–4 victory against the Tampa Bay Rays on April 8. He became the 24th player to reach this mark.
- Adam Wainwright (STL):
  - Became the first pitcher in modern Major League history (since 1900) to throw a shutout with at least a dozen strikeouts and no walks allowed, while also collecting three or more hits as a batter. He did this against the Milwaukee Brewers on April 13.
  - Became the first pitcher in modern Major League history (since 1900) to accumulate over 30 strikeouts before issuing his first walk of the season. He struck out 35 batters before walking Bryce Harper of the Washington Nationals on April 23.
- Matt Harvey (NYM):
  - Became the first pitcher in modern Major League history (since 1900) to win each of his first three starts of a season, with at least 25 strikeouts and six or fewer hits allowed over those three games.
  - Became the first pitcher in modern Major League history (since 1900) to win his first four starts while allowing no more than ten hits in those four starts combined.
- Roy Halladay (PHI):
  - Recorded his 200th career victory by defeating the Miami Marlins on April 14. He became the 112th player to reach this mark.
- A. J. Burnett (PIT):
  - Record his 2000th career strikeout by striking out Carlos Beltrán of the St. Louis Cardinals in the second inning on April 17. He became the 68th player to reach this mark.
- Aníbal Sánchez (DET):
  - Set the Tigers franchise record and interleague record for most strikeouts in a game by striking out 17 Atlanta Braves on April 26. He broke the team record of 16 that was held by Mickey Lolich on May 23, 1969, and June 9, 1969. He broke the interleague record of 16 that was held by Pedro Martínez in 1999 and Curt Schilling in 1997.
- Tim Hudson (ATL):
  - Recorded his 200th career victory by defeating the Washington Nationals on April 30. He became the 113th player to reach this mark.
- Alex Cobb (TB):
  - On May 10 against the San Diego Padres, Cobb struck out 13 in 4 2/3 becoming the first pitcher in Major League history to amass that many strikeouts in a game in which he pitched fewer than five innings.
- Matt Harvey (NYM)/Shelby Miller (STL)/Jon Lester (BOS)/Chris Sale (CWS):
  - Sale, of the Chicago White Sox, allowed only one runner to reach base on May 12. This makes it the fourth time in the last six days that a pitcher did not allow a run or more than one baserunner while throwing at least nine innings. The Cardinals Miller and Red Sox Lester each did that in their shutouts on May 10 and the Mets Harvey had a start like that on May 7. This is the first month in the modern era (1900 to date) in which four pitchers had starts of nine or more shutout innings with no more than one batter reaching base via hit, walk or hit by pitch.
- Max Scherzer (DET):
  - Became the second pitcher in Major League history to be undefeated with 100+ strikeouts in his first 12 starts of the season with his victory on June 6 against the Tampa Bay Rays. Scherzer, who was 8–0 with 100 strikeouts joined Roger Clemens, who was 11–0 with 104 strikeouts in 1986 for the Boston Red Sox.
  - Became the first starting pitcher in Major League history to begin a season 10–0 with no complete games thrown at that point. He recorded his tenth win on June 17 against the Baltimore Orioles.
  - With his victory on August 24 against the New York Mets Scherzer raised his record to 19–1. This matched the Major League record best won-lost record in a pitcher's first 20 decisions of a season that is held by Rube Marquard of the 1912 New York Giants and Roger Clemens of the 2001 New York Yankees.
- Andy Pettitte (NYY):
  - Recorded his 250th career victory by defeating the Seattle Mariners on June 8. He became the 47th player to reach this mark.
  - Became the all-time franchise leader in strikeouts when he fanned Justin Morneau of the Minnesota Twins on July 1 in the fifth inning. It was his 1958th strikeout as a member of the Yankees. He broke the record that was held by Whitey Ford.
  - With his 10th victory of the season against the Toronto Blue Jays on August 28, it was 14th time in his career that Pettitte recorded double-digit wins for the Yankees. That's the most such seasons in Yankees history, one more than Whitey Ford.
  - Finished the season 11–11 and retires as the pitcher in Major League history who pitched in the most seasons without ever having a losing record in any season.
- Ryan Dempster (BOS):
  - Recorded his 2000th career strikeout by striking out Alberto Callaspo of the Los Angeles Angels of Anaheim in the sixth inning on June 9. He became the 69th player to reach this mark.
- Bartolo Colón (OAK):
  - With his victory against the Seattle Mariners on June 21, Colon became the first pitcher in Major League history to win each of first six starts made in their 40s.
- Francisco Rodríguez (BAL)/(MIL):
  - Recorded his 300th career save by closing out a 2–0 victory against the Atlanta Braves on June 22. He became the 25th player to reach this mark.
- CC Sabathia (NYY):
  - Recorded his 200th career victory by defeating the Minnesota Twins on July 3. He became the 114th player to reach this mark.
  - With his 10th victory of the season against the Los Angeles Angels of Anaheim on August 13, Sabathia reached double figures in wins in each of his first 13 seasons in the major leagues. Only four other pitchers who began their career in the modern era (since 1900) won ten or more games in each of their first 13 seasons: Don Sutton (17 from 1966 to 1982), Eddie Plank (16 from 1901 to 1916), Tom Seaver (15 from 1967 to 1981) and Carl Hubbell (15 from 1928 to 1942).
- Grant Balfour (OAK):
  - Set a franchise record for most consecutive saves by closing out the game against the Pittsburgh Pirates on July 8. His 41st straight broke the team record held by Dennis Eckersley. Balfour set the team record the next night by closing out a 2–1 victory against the Pirates. Balfour's team record of consecutive saves ended at 44 after he blew the save against the Houston Astros on July 23.
- Stephen Strasburg (WSH):
  - Became the second pitcher in the modern era (since 1900) to have a game with recording at least 12 strikeouts while allowing two or fewer hits and zero walks in a loss to the Pittsburgh Pirates on July 24. The other pitcher was James Shields last season for the Tampa Bay Rays against the Baltimore Orioles.
- Yu Darvish (TEX):
  - Making his 50th start on August 1 against the Arizona Diamondbacks, Darvish struck out 14 batters giving him 407 career strikeouts. This is the second-highest total for any pitcher since 1900 in his first 50 major-league starts. Dwight Gooden holds the modern-day record with 418 strikeouts.
  - Set the team record for most strikeouts in a month for August with 64. He broke the team record that was held by Jim Bibby that set the mark with 60 in July 1973.
- Andrew Albers (MIN):
  - Became the first pitcher in Twins history to go at least eight scoreless innings pitched in their Major League debut. Albers went 8 1/3 against the Kansas City Royals on August 6 striking out two, walking one and allowing four hits.
- Dan Haren (WSH):
  - With his victory against the Philadelphia Phillies on August 9, Haren became the 13th pitcher to have a victory against all 30 Major League teams.
- Craig Kimbrel (ATL):
  - With his 40th save on August 21 against the New York Mets, Kimbrel became the first pitcher to have 40 or more saves in three consecutive seasons, starting as a rookie.
- Jose Fernandez (MIA):
  - Set the franchise rookie record for most strikeouts in a season by recording his 167th strikeout in the first inning against the Atlanta Braves on August 30. Chris Johnson was the victim. He broke the rookie record that was set by Scott Olsen in 2006. Fernandez finished the season with 187 strikeouts.
  - Became the first pitcher in modern Major League history to have two games in his rookie season in which he pitched at least seven innings, allowed no runs and no more than one hit and struck out at least nine batters after his performance on September 6 against the Washington Nationals.
- Jarrod Parker (OAK):
  - Set the franchise record for most consecutive starts without a loss. His streak of 19 games ended when Parker lost to the Los Angeles Angels of Anaheim on September 16.
- Matt Cain (SF):
  - With his strike out of Andrew Brown of the New York Mets in the second inning on September 18, Cain reached 150 strike outs for his eighth consecutive season. This ties him with Juan Marichal (1962–1969) and Gaylord Perry (1964–1971) for the longest such streak in the Giants' franchise history.
- Detroit Tigers:
  - For the first time in franchise history, the Tigers had five pitchers to record at least 13 wins in a season after Doug Fister won his 13th game against the Seattle Mariners on September 19. Joining Fister with at least 13 wins were Max Scherzer, Aníbal Sánchez, Justin Verlander and Rick Porcello.
- Greg Holland (KC):
  - Tied the franchise record for saves in a season by closing out a 6–5 victory against the Seattle Mariners on September 23. Holland's 45th save tied the record set by Dan Quisenberry in 1983 and by Jeff Montgomery in 1993. Holland broke the team record on September 26 with his save against the Chicago White Sox. Holland finished the season with 47 saves.

=== Miscellaneous ===
- Houston Astros:
  - Became the first team in Major League history to strikeout at least 13 times in each of four consecutive games of one season. Houston's batters totaled 13 strikeouts on Opening Night (March 31 against the Texas Rangers), followed by 15 (April 2 vs. Rangers), 15 (April 3 vs. Rangers) and 13 (April 5 vs. Oakland Athletics) in the next three games.
  - With their 14 team strikeouts against the Oakland Athletics on April 7, they increased their season total to 74. This is the most for any major league team through its first six games of a season in the modern era (since 1900).
  - With their loss on May 14 to the Detroit Tigers, Houston's record fell to 10–30. That's the Astros' worst mark through 40 games in team history. Their previous low was 13 wins through 40 games in 1967 and 1975.
  - With Brett Wallace strikeout in the fourth inning on August 1 against the Baltimore Orioles, the Astros reached 1000 strikeouts for the season. Houston batters reached this mark in their 107th game breaking the Major League record that was held by the 2010 Arizona Diamondbacks. The Diamondbacks took 109 games to reach 1000 strikeouts that season.
  - Set the American League all-time record for strikeouts in a season when Trevor Crowe struck out to end the fifth inning against the Los Angeles Angels of Anaheim on September 14. They broke the record that was set the Oakland Athletics last year.
  - Set the Major League all-time record for strike outs with 1,535, breaking the record that was set by the 2010 Arizona Diamondbacks.
  - Lost the last 15 games of the season, becoming the team with the most consecutive losses to end a season since the 1899 Cleveland Spiders.
- New York Yankees:
  - With their victory against the Toronto Blue Jays on May 17, they became the first team in American League history to begin a season 17–0 in games in which they scored the first run.
- Chicago Cubs:
  - With a grand slam from pitcher Travis Wood on May 30, Cubs pitchers have driven in 19 runs in May, the most for any National League team in any calendar month since RBI became an official statistic in 1920.
- Chicago White Sox/Seattle Mariners:
  - On June 5 the White Sox and Mariners labored through 13 scoreless innings before both teams exploded for five runs each in the 14th inning in a game that ended in a 7–5 win for Chicago in 16 innings. This was the first time in Major League history that both teams scored at least five runs in a game that was scoreless through nine innings.
- New York Mets/Miami Marlins, Texas Rangers/Toronto Blue Jays:
  - The two games combined to be a total of 38 innings, and nearly 12 hours long, both on June 8. Texas and Toronto played 18 innings while Miami and the Mets played twenty. These games are the longest pair of games in ninety-seven years. Eventually, Toronto and Miami went home finally with victories.
- Bruce Bochy (SF):
  - Became the 21st manager in Major League history to reach 1500 career wins with the Giants victory over the Cincinnati Reds on July 23.
- July 27:
  - There were four 1–0 games on this date: three in the American League (Rays over the Yankees, Royals over the White Sox, Indians over the Rangers) and one in the National League (Cubs over the Giants). In Major League history the only other day on which there were four 1–0 games was September 2, 2001, when the winning teams were the Yankees (vs. Boston), Mariners (vs. Baltimore), Astros (vs. Milwaukee) and Padres (vs. Arizona).
- Texas Rangers:
  - Became the second team in Major League history to win each game of a three-game series with a walk-off home run. The Rangers accomplished this feat against the Los Angeles Angels of Anaheim on July 29–31. Geovany Soto hit a two-run home run on July 29, Leonys Martín hit a three-run home run on July 30 and Adrián Beltré hit a solo home run on July 31 to accomplish the feat. The only other time that this happened was when the Arizona Diamondbacks beat the Montreal Expos in 1999 as Jay Bell, Luis Gonzalez and Matt Williams provided the walk-off home runs.
- Ron Washington (TEX):
  - Became the Rangers winningest manager in franchise history when the Rangers defeated the Oakland Athletics on August 4. This victory gave Washington his 582nd victory which broke the team record that was held by Bobby Valentine.
- Arizona Diamondbacks/Philadelphia Phillies:
  - In an 18 inning game on August 24–25, the teams drew a combined 28 walks, setting a National League record. The Diamondbacks' 18 walks tied the National League mark. The game lasted seven hours and six minutes, the longest in franchise history for both clubs. The 18 innings also tied the longest game by innings in Arizona Diamondbacks history. The Diamondbacks also tied a major league record set in 1927 for most runs scored in the 18th inning, by scoring five runs against the Phillies.
- Pittsburgh Pirates:
  - With their victory on September 3 against the Milwaukee Brewers, the Pirates won their 81st game of the season, ensuring they will not finish with a losing record for the first time since it went 96–66 in 1992. The Pirates finished the season with 94 wins.
- Boston Red Sox:
  - With seven players hitting home runs on September 4 against the Detroit Tigers, the Red Sox tied the American League record for most players with home runs in one game.
- Baltimore Orioles:
  - With their 114th errorless game of the season on September 18 against the Boston Red Sox, the Orioles broke the Major League record that was held by the 2008 Houston Astros. They finished with 119 errorless games.
- Detroit Tigers:
  - Set the Major League record for single-season strikeouts and tied the Major League record for most 200-strikeout pitchers in a season on September 28 against the Miami Marlins. The Tigers finished with 1,428 strikeouts (broke the record that was set by the 2003 Chicago Cubs) and with three pitchers of at least 200 strike outs joining the 1967 Minnesota Twins and 1969 Houston Astros.

== Awards and honors ==
=== Regular season ===
Baseball Writers' Association of America Awards
BBWAA Award	National League	American League
Rookie of the Year	José Fernández (MIA)	Wil Myers (TB)
Cy Young Award	Clayton Kershaw (LAD)	Max Scherzer (DET)
Manager of the Year	Clint Hurdle (PIT)	Terry Francona (CLE)
Most Valuable Player	Andrew McCutchen (PIT)	Miguel Cabrera (DET)
Gold Glove Awards
Position	National League	American League
Pitcher	Adam Wainwright (STL)	R. A. Dickey (TOR)
Catcher	Yadier Molina (STL)	Salvador Pérez (KC)
1st Base	Paul Goldschmidt (AZ)	Eric Hosmer (KC)
2nd Base	Brandon Phillips (CIN)	Dustin Pedroia (BOS)
3rd Base	Nolan Arenado (COL)	Manny Machado (BAL)
Shortstop	Andrelton Simmons (ATL)	J. J. Hardy (BAL)
Left field	Carlos González (COL)	Alex Gordon (KC)
Center field	Carlos Gómez (MIL)	Adam Jones (BAL)
Right field	Gerardo Parra (AZ)	Shane Victorino (BOS)
Silver Slugger Awards
Pitcher/Designated Hitter	Zack Greinke (LAD)	David Ortiz (BOS)
Catcher	Yadier Molina (STL)	Joe Mauer (MIN)
1st Base	Paul Goldschmidt (AZ)	Chris Davis (BAL)
2nd Base	Matt Carpenter (STL)	Robinson Canó (NYY)
3rd Base	Pedro Álvarez (PIT)	Miguel Cabrera (DET)
Shortstop	Ian Desmond (WSH)	J. J. Hardy (BAL)
Outfield	Jay Bruce (CIN)	Torii Hunter (DET)
Outfield	Michael Cuddyer (COL)	Adam Jones (BAL)
Outfield	Andrew McCutchen (PIT)	Mike Trout (LAA)

=== Other awards ===
- The Sporting News Player of the Year Award: Miguel Cabrera (DET)
- Comeback Players of the Year: Mariano Rivera (NYY, American); Francisco Liriano (PIT, National)
- Edgar Martínez Award (Best designated hitter): David Ortiz (BOS)
- Hank Aaron Award: Miguel Cabrera (DET, American); Paul Goldschmidt (AZ, National)
- Roberto Clemente Award (Humanitarian): Carlos Beltrán (STL)
- Delivery Man of the Year (Best reliever): Craig Kimbrel (ATL)
- Warren Spahn Award (Best left-handed pitcher): Clayton Kershaw (LAD)

Fielding Bible Awards
Position	Player
Pitcher	R. A. Dickey (TOR)
Catcher	Yadier Molina (STL)
1st Base	Paul Goldschmidt (AZ)
2nd Base	Dustin Pedroia (BOS)
3rd Base	Manny Machado (BAL)
Shortstop	Andrelton Simmons (ATL)
Left Field	Alex Gordon (KC)
Center Field	Carlos Gómez (MIL)
Right Field	Gerardo Parra (AZ)

=== Monthly Awards ===
==== Player of the Month ====
Month	American League	National League
April	Chris Davis	Justin Upton
May	Miguel Cabrera	Domonic Brown
June	Jason Kipnis	Yasiel Puig
July	Adrián Beltré	Jayson Werth
August	Miguel Cabrera	Martín Prado
September	Josh Donaldson	Hunter Pence

==== Pitcher of the Month ====
Month	American League	National League
April	Clay Buchholz	Matt Harvey
May	Jason Vargas	Patrick Corbin
June	Bartolo Colón	Adam Wainwright
July	Chris Archer	Clayton Kershaw
August	Iván Nova	Zack Greinke
September	Ubaldo Jiménez	Kris Medlen

==== Rookie of the Month ====
Month	American League	National League
April	Justin Grimm	Evan Gattis
May	Nate Freiman	Evan Gattis
June	José Iglesias	Yasiel Puig
July	Chris Archer	José Fernández
August	Martín Pérez	José Fernández
September	Wil Myers	Gerrit Cole

== Home field attendance and payroll ==
Team name	Wins	%±	Home attendance	%±	Per game	Est. payroll	%±
Los Angeles Dodgers	92	7.0%	3,743,527	12.6%	46,216	$254,161,000	43.6%
St. Louis Cardinals	97	10.2%	3,369,769	3.3%	41,602	$112,583,000	0.5%
San Francisco Giants	76	−19.1%	3,369,106	−0.2%	41,087	$139,845,667	18.9%
New York Yankees	85	−10.5%	3,279,589	−7.4%	40,489	$246,534,750	24.5%
Texas Rangers	91	−2.2%	3,178,273	−8.1%	38,759	$139,261,200	12.2%
Detroit Tigers	93	5.7%	3,083,397	1.8%	38,067	$154,407,000	17.5%
Los Angeles Angels of Anaheim	78	−12.4%	3,019,505	−1.4%	37,278	$116,532,500	−17.4%
Philadelphia Phillies	73	−9.9%	3,012,403	−15.5%	37,190	$150,860,000	−12.0%
Boston Red Sox	97	40.6%	2,833,333	−6.9%	34,979	$175,395,500	58.9%
Colorado Rockies	74	15.6%	2,793,828	6.2%	34,492	$73,768,000	−2.3%
Washington Nationals	86	−12.2%	2,652,422	11.9%	32,746	$112,493,250	21.8%
Chicago Cubs	66	8.2%	2,642,682	−8.3%	32,626	$67,874,166	−21.2%
Atlanta Braves	96	2.1%	2,548,679	5.3%	31,465	$95,618,750	10.9%
Toronto Blue Jays	74	1.4%	2,536,562	20.8%	31,316	$124,517,800	51.2%
Milwaukee Brewers	74	−10.8%	2,531,105	−10.6%	31,248	$86,945,000	−9.2%
Cincinnati Reds	90	−7.2%	2,492,101	6.2%	31,151	$106,255,535	32.3%
Minnesota Twins	66	0.0%	2,477,644	−10.8%	30,588	$63,042,500	−36.4%
Baltimore Orioles	85	−8.6%	2,357,561	12.1%	29,106	$100,832,000	29.4%
Pittsburgh Pirates	94	19.0%	2,256,862	7.9%	27,862	$99,230,000	41.6%
San Diego Padres	76	0.0%	2,166,691	2.0%	26,749	$65,988,600	18.9%
New York Mets	74	0.0%	2,135,657	−4.8%	26,366	$69,425,860	−24.2%
Arizona Diamondbacks	81	0.0%	2,134,895	−2.0%	26,357	$80,060,500	19.4%
Oakland Athletics	96	2.1%	1,809,302	7.8%	22,337	$69,440,000	13.5%
Chicago White Sox	63	−25.9%	1,768,413	−10.0%	21,832	$81,401,900	−31.1%
Seattle Mariners	71	−5.3%	1,761,546	2.3%	21,747	$78,887,000	0.8%
Kansas City Royals	86	19.4%	1,750,754	0.6%	21,614	$87,426,250	41.6%
Houston Astros	51	−7.3%	1,651,883	2.7%	20,394	$14,672,300	−61.0%
Miami Marlins	62	−10.1%	1,586,322	−28.5%	19,584	$24,761,900	−77.0%
Cleveland Indians	92	35.3%	1,572,926	−1.9%	19,419	$87,342,433	10.7%
Tampa Bay Rays	92	2.2%	1,510,300	−3.2%	18,646	$71,163,500	12.3%

== Uniforms ==
=== Wholesale changes ===
All 30 teams are wearing new batting practice caps. The new caps provided by the New Era Cap Company are of the 59Fifty style instead of the 39Fifty used in seasons past. In addition to batting practice and spring training games, Major League Baseball has also allowed the use of the new caps during regular season play.

The Houston Astros unveiled a new/old identity at a fan event November 2, 2012, at Minute Maid Park, as the team reverted to the orange and navy colors used from their inception in 1962 through 1993. There are four uniforms and three hats. Houston will wear white uniforms with orange piping at home, and gray ones with blue piping on the road. There's an orange alternate jersey with blue piping that can be worn at home or on the road, as well as a blue jersey to be worn for Sunday games.

On November 14, the New York Mets introduced two new blue alternate jerseys. The home alternate features the "Mets" script, player numerals and names in orange outlined in white, while the road alternate features the "NEW YORK" script, player numerals and names in gray outlined in orange. The team also introduced a new alternate cap with a blue crown and an orange brim, with an orange "NY" logo outlined in white.

On November 19, the St. Louis Cardinals introduced an alternate uniform to be worn for Saturday home games. The uniform is off-white and the jersey features the "St. Louis" script on the front. This is the first time in 80 years the city name appears in the team's uniforms.

On December 14, the Pittsburgh Pirates introduced an alternate uniform to be worn for Sunday home games. It is the same uniform that the team wore from mid-1970 through 1976 and was worn during their championship season of 1971. The hat that goes with this uniform is mustard gold with a black bill.

On January 24, 2013, the Chicago White Sox announced they will be wearing 1983 throwback uniforms on Sunday home games to celebrate the 30th anniversary of their 1983 division title. The uniforms replaced the 1972 red pinstriped throwbacks from last season.

On January 24, the Milwaukee Brewers promoted their special edition 'gold-out' uniforms to alternate status. The uniforms were first used on September 10, 2011, against the Phillies, but did not wear them the previous season. The Brewers have also worn a Latin Nights version of the gold uniform (with 'Cerveceros' wordmark) the last two seasons, and would wear them again on June 8 against the Phillies. They also wore a fan-designed uniform for two spring training games, featuring an updated version of the Beer Barrel Man logo in the current colors, and classic typeface design, designed by Ben Peters of Richfield, Minnesota.

=== Throwbacks ===
As part of the franchise's 20th anniversary, the Colorado Rockies wore their original grey away uniforms at Coors Field on April 16 against the Mets. The uniforms, complete with the inaugural season patch, team name and purple piping, were the uniforms the Rockies used in their inaugural 1993 season. Though it was a home game, they wore the grey throwbacks to correspond to the franchise's first game at Shea Stadium. The Mets wore corresponding throwback white pinstripe uniforms with an underscore below the word 'Mets'.

The Detroit Tigers donned Detroit Stars throwbacks for Negro leagues tribute night against the Atlanta Braves on April 27. The Braves wore Atlanta Black Crackers throwbacks.

The Brewers wore the 1913 American Association throwbacks on May 5 against the Cardinals, who wore corresponding throwbacks.

The San Diego Padres wore their orange, gold and brown home throwbacks from the 1984 season against the Washington Nationals on May 17. On June 14, they wore their 1998 navy alternates against the Arizona Diamondbacks. On July 12, they wore throwbacks of the 1948 Padres of the Pacific Coast League against the Giants.

The Minnesota Twins wore the 1948 St. Paul Saints uniforms on May 30 against the Brewers. Even though the game was held at Target Field, the Twins wore the road grey versions of the throwbacks, while the Brewers will wore the home whites.

Four teams – the Pirates, the Reds, the Nationals and the Braves – wore Negro leagues throwbacks on June 1. The Pirates wore the Homestead Grays uniforms, while the Reds wore the Cincinnati Tigers uniforms. The Nationals and Braves wore Negro leagues throwbacks that day as well, the Nationals wearing Grays uniforms, and the Braves donning Black Crackers uniforms. (The Grays called Pittsburgh and Washington home.) On July 20, the Brewers wore the Negro league Milwaukee Bears uniforms against the Marlins, who wore the uniforms of the International League Marlins. The Nationals again represented the Grays on August 24 against the Royals, who wore Kansas City Monarchs uniforms.

The Seattle Mariners wore the 1909 Seattle Turks uniforms for their interleague matchup with the Chicago Cubs on June 29. The Cubs wore their 1909 throwbacks, as well.

The Kansas City Royals wore their 1985 powder blue pullover uniforms on June 9 against the Astros.

The Tampa Bay Rays wore their faux-back 1970s uniforms on July 6 against the White Sox, who wore the previous season's Sunday home throwback jerseys from the 1972 season.

The Cleveland Indians wore the 1902 Cleveland Bronchos uniforms on July 13, in a non-televised game against the Royals. Despite the game taking place at Progressive Field, the Indians wore the road version of the Bronchos uniforms (navy jersey, cap, and pants, with black socks).

The White Sox, in celebration of their 1983 AL West champion team, donned 1983-replica jerseys during each Sunday home game, as well as other select occasions.

The Angels and Athletics wore 1969 throwbacks on July 27. The Angels then wore a hybridized version of their 1980s throwbacks (with buttons, belts and California patch on the left sleeve) on August 16, and then their 1961–65 throwbacks the following day against the Astros. The 1961–65 throwbacks were worn again on September 5 against the Rays to pay tribute to Bobby Knoop's induction to the Angels Hall of Fame.

The Philadelphia Phillies wore their 1991 home pinstripe throwbacks on August 23 against the Diamondbacks, who wore their 1999 black alternate throwbacks. The Diamondbacks also wore the said throwback uniforms on August 31 against the Giants.

=== Other uniforms ===
The San Francisco Giants wore special uniforms to commemorate their 2012 World Series win on April 7. Similar to their commemoration of their 2010 World Series championship, the jerseys, instead of bearing the familiar "GIANTS" across the chest, displayed the interlocking "SF" logo on the front of the jersey's left side in gold. The Giants also wore caps with the "SF" logo also in gold.

On April 20 and 21, the Boston Red Sox wore home uniforms with "BOSTON" on the front of the jerseys instead of the familiar "RED SOX" to honor the victims of the Boston Marathon bombing.

Cinco de Mayo saw two teams don Hispanic-flavored uniforms. The Giants wore their cream home uniforms with 'Gigantes' in front against the Dodgers, while the Houston Astros wore their current home uniforms with 'Los Astros' in front against the Detroit Tigers. The Cincinnati Reds wore red jerseys with 'Los Rojos' in front for their May 11 game against Milwaukee. The Giants again wore the 'Gigantes' uniforms against the Diamondbacks on September 7. On the same day, the Seattle Mariners wore a modified version of their white uniforms against the Rays, featuring 'Marineros' in front.

The Pittsburgh Pirates wore desert camouflage uniforms for their games against the Astros May 17 and 18.

All teams wore uniforms with camouflaged logos, names and numerals on May 27, Memorial Day in the United States.

The Milwaukee Brewers wore special batting practice uniforms against the Braves on June 23 for Polish Heritage Day. The uniform is white with red striping, featuring "Piwowarzy" in front. They also wore red fielding caps.

The Toronto Blue Jays wore red jerseys against the Detroit Tigers on July 1, Canada Day in Canada.

The Arizona Diamondbacks wore special black uniforms during their homestand from July 5–14 to commemorate the 19 firefighters who perished in the Yarnell Hill Fire. The style was similar to their alternate black uniforms, except the front read 'Arizona' in brick red, and had black and sand trim.

All teams wore special caps with an American (or Canadian) flag on July 4. The Reds, whose game was rained out that day, wore the caps on July 5 against Seattle.

The New York Mets wore a special orange 'Los Mets' jersey on July 24 against Atlanta.

The Tigers wore a Hispanic-flavored home uniform against the White Sox on August 3 as part of the 'Fiesta Tigres' promotion. The uniform is similar in style to the 1960 script uniforms, but read 'Tigres' in front.

The Washington Nationals wore US Navy caps on September 17 during pre-game before the first game of a doubleheader against Atlanta to commemorate the victims of the Washington Navy Yard shooting. The first game was a makeup game for the one scheduled for September 16 which was postponed due to the shooting.

=== Patches ===
==== Anniversaries and special events ====
The following teams wore commemorative patches for special occasions:

Team	Special occasion
Colorado Rockies	20th Anniversary of the franchise
New York Mets	Host city of the 2013 MLB All-Star Game
San Francisco Giants	To commemorate their 2012 World Series championship
All 30 Teams	To commemorate December 14, 2012 Sandy Hook Elementary School shooting (Opening Day series only)
All 30 Teams	Breast cancer awareness ribbons (May 12 – Mother's Day).
All 30 Teams	Prostate cancer awareness ribbons (June 16 – Father's Day).

==== Memorials ====
- The Baltimore Orioles wore a patch honoring former manager Earl Weaver, who died on January 19. The circular patch is in orange with a black-and-white border, with Weaver's No. 4 in black surrounding his name and Hall of Fame designation.
- The St. Louis Cardinals wore a patch honoring former player Stan Musial, who died on January 19. The patch features Musial's No. 6 in red with navy trim, along with his signature and a red and navy border. Three versions of the patch will be used: a white one for home uniforms, a grey one for away uniforms, and a cream one for their new alternate uniforms. These will be worn on the left sleeve. During a three-game interleague series against the Los Angeles Angels of Anaheim from July 2–4, at the urging of former Cardinal Albert Pujols, the Angels wore the Musial patch on their batting practice uniforms.
- To honor the victims of the Boston Marathon bombing, the Boston Red Sox sported black armbands on the right sleeve of their road uniforms; and wore a navy-blue circular patch with a white border saying "B Strong" (with the red B in the classic font featured on the Red Sox's caps) on their home and alternate uniforms. The Cleveland Indians also wore the black armbands during the Red Sox's visit to Progressive Field on April 16, the Kansas City Royals wore the "B Strong" patch on April 20–21 (the first two games at Fenway Park after the bombing), and the San Francisco Giants wore the "B Strong" patch during the Red Sox's visit to AT&T Park on August 19.
- The Los Angeles Angels of Anaheim wore navy circular patches on the left chest of their uniforms to honor team doctor Lewis Yocum, who died on May 28. The patch features Yocum's nickname 'LEW'. In addition, Seattle Mariners players Félix Hernández, Raúl Ibañez and Kendrys Morales wore the patch during a game against the Angels on June 20.
- The Houston Astros wore a black HFD patch (during their brief 3-game homestand against the Orioles from June 4–6) to honor the four Houston Firefighters who lost their lives in the Southwest Inn fire.
- The Arizona Diamondbacks wore black armbands on their right sleeve beginning July 1 against the New York Mets to honor the 19 firefighters killed in the Yarnell Hill Fire in Prescott, Arizona. They also wore a white patch with the No. 19 in black on the left chest of a special black uniform, which would be worn during their homestand of July 5–14. For the rest of the season, the black version of the patch will be sewn on the right sleeve of the uniforms.
- The Miami Marlins wore a circular patch on the right sleeve of the throwback International League Marlins uniforms on July 20 against the Brewers to honor Satchel Paige, who played for the IL Marlins from 1956 to 1959. The patch is blue with Paige's No. 29 in orange with white trim.
- The Seattle Mariners wore a black circular patch on the right sleeve to honor former owner Hiroshi Yamauchi, who died on September 19. The patch features Yamauchi's initials 'HY' inside the black circle.
- All Major League umpires wore 'WB' patches to honor umpire Wally Bell, who died on October 14.

== Television ==
=== National ===
This was the seventh and final year of the current TV contracts with ESPN, Fox Sports and TBS, before the new eight-year TV contracts begin in 2014. ESPN aired games on Sundays, most Mondays, and Wednesdays, in addition to a four-game Opening Day schedule. ESPN also aired the Home Run Derby during All-Star week. TBS carried Sunday afternoon games, along with two League Wild Card Games, League Division Series, and National League Championship Series. Fox aired games on Saturday afternoons and select Saturday nights, and also aired the All-Star Game, American League Championship Series, and World Series. MLB Network had a Thursday game of the week and several simulcasted games from local channels during the season.

=== Local ===
The Houston Astros switched from Fox Sports Houston to Comcast SportsNet Houston starting this season.

On March 1, 2013, Fox Sports South and SportSouth announced they have picked up 45 more Atlanta Braves games, ending the team's contract with WPCH-TV. This will be the first season in 40 years without locally produced Braves games on over-the-air TV.

This is the final season of Los Angeles Dodgers games on Prime Ticket and KCAL-TV. They will move to a new channel called SportsNet LA in 2014.

Cleveland Indians owner Larry Dolan sold SportsTime Ohio to Fox Sports Networks on December 28, 2012, and it was rebranded as Fox SportsTime Ohio on April 1, 2013.

== Retirements ==
- Mariano Rivera of the New York Yankees announced on March 9 that he would be retiring at the conclusion of the season.
- Édgar Rentería announced his retirement on March 22.
- Carlos Lee announced his retirement on June 21.
- Jim Thome announced his retirement on July 2.
- Derek Lowe announced his retirement on July 18.
- Vladimir Guerrero, who last played in 2011, officially announced his retirement on September 14.
- Todd Helton announced on September 14 that he will retire at the end of season.
- Mark Kotsay announced on September 16 that he will retire at the end of the season.
- Andy Pettitte announced on September 20 that he will retire at the end of the season.
- Mark DeRosa announced his retirement on November 12.
- Chris Carpenter announced that he will retire after the season. He made it official on November 20.
- Chad Durbin announced his retirement on November 25.
- Ted Lilly announced his retirement on November 27.
- Roy Halladay announced his retirement on December 9.
- Mark Prior, who last played in the majors in 2006, announced his retirement on December 10.
- Jerry Hairston Jr. announced his retirement on December 11, joining the Sports LA broadcasting team.
- Jeff Suppan announced his retirement on January 2, 2014.
- Aubrey Huff announced his retirement on January 4, 2014.
- Ryan Theriot announced his retirement on January 6, 2014.
- Dallas Braden announced his retirement on January 14, 2014.
- Rod Barajas announced his retirement on January 14, 2014.
- Lance Berkman announced his retirement on January 29, 2014.
- Michael Young announced his retirement on January 30, 2014.
- Matt Diaz announced his retirement on February 4, 2014.
- Ryan Spilborghs announced his retirement on February 7, 2014. He played in Japan the previous year and his last season in the major leagues was 2011.
- Dan Wheeler announced his retirement on February 7, 2014.
- Joel Zumaya announced his retirement on February 7, 2014.
- Roy Oswalt announced his retirement on February 11, 2014.
- Jake Westbrook announced his retirement on February 14, 2014.
- Carl Pavano announced his retirement on February 26, 2014.
- Guillermo Mota announced his retirement on February 28, 2014.
- Rick Ankiel announced his retirement on March 5, 2014.
- Liván Hernández, who last played in the majors in 2012, officially announced his retirement on March 13, 2014.
- Bill Bray announced his retirement via Twitter on March 16, 2014.

== Retired numbers ==
- Chipper Jones of the Atlanta Braves had his No. 10 retired by the team on June 28 against the Arizona Diamondbacks. He was the 11th player to have his number retired by the Braves.
- Mariano Rivera of the New York Yankees had his No. 42 retired by the team in a special ceremony at Yankee Stadium on September 22. Rivera was the last player to wear the number after its universal retirement in MLB in honor of Jackie Robinson.

== See also ==
- 2013 Korea Professional Baseball season
- 2013 Nippon Professional Baseball season
