= Transportation in Sugar Land, Texas =

Transportation in Sugar Land, Texas includes multiple highways,public transportation, and an airport. It has been a possible candidate for expansion of Houston's METRORail system by means of a planned commuter rail. Since many of Sugar Land's residents work in Houston, thus creating routine rush hour traffic along the city's main thoroughfare, Interstate 69/U.S. Highway 59, there has been large support in the area for such a project (However, the city is not within Metro's service area).

== Major thoroughfares ==

- Interstate 69/U.S. Highway 59, the major freeway running diagonally through the city, has undergone a major widening project in recent years to accommodate Sugar Land's daily commuters. The finished portion of the freeway east of State Highway 6 has eight main lanes with two diamond lanes and six continuous frontage road lanes. Interstate 69/U.S. Highway 59 has been widened to just west of State Highway 6 out to State Highway 99.
- U.S. Highway 90A, a major highway running through Sugar Land from west to east and traverses through a historic area of the city, known as "Old Sugar Land". U.S. Highway 90A is being widened to an eight-lane highway with a 30-foot median between State Highway 99 and Interstate 69/U.S. Highway 59.
- State Highway 6 is a major highway running from north to southeast Sugar Land and traverses through the 10,000 acre (40 km^{2}) master-planned community of First Colony. Construction is about to start on a bridge over University Blvd and U.S. Highway 90A from First Colony Blvd to north of the railroad track at U.S. Highway 90A. When completed, it will have six main lanes and frontage roads.
- Grand Parkway/State Highway 99 is a new highway that opened in 1994 with frontage roads. The main toll lanes opened in 2014. It traverses through the New Territory and River Park master-planned communities in Sugar Land's extraterritorial jurisdiction (ETJ), west of Sugar Land's current city limits. Construction will start soon south of its current terminus at Interstate 69/U.S. Highway 59. It will eventually passes through the master-planned community of Greatwood and other communities such as Canyon Gate at the Brazos and Tara Colony, which are in Sugar Land's extraterritorial jurisdiction (ETJ), southwest of the city limits.
- Farm to Market Road 1876, widely known as Eldridge Road, is a north–south state highway in north Sugar Land. It traverses through many established areas and acts as the western border of the Sugar Land Business Park. Going north leads into the city of Houston and Harris County.
- Farm to Market Road 2759, or Crabb River Road and Thompsons Road, is a rural state highway serving the far southwestern portion of Sugar Land's extraterritorial jurisdiction. The highway starts at the terminus of State Highway 99 at Interstate 69/U.S. Highway 59 and traverses by the master-planned community of Greatwood and other communities such as Canyon Gate at the Brazos, Tara Colony, Royal Lake Estates, and eventually to the town of Thompsons.
- University Boulevard, formerly referred to as State Highway 6 Bypass south of U.S. Highway 90A and Burney Road Bypass north of U.S. Highway 90A, is a proposed major north–south to southeast arterial. It will eventually traverse through the master-planned communities of Sugar Mill, First Crossing, Telfair (formerly known as TX DOT Tract 4 & 5), Avalon, and Riverstone. A portion is completed from south of Interstate 69/U.S. Highway 59 to the Commonwealth Blvd intersection, just west of the Avalon master-planned community. Another completed section is east of State Highway 6 as it traverses through the First Crossing master-planned commercial development and dead ends just before U.S. Highway 90A. Portions also are open to traffic in the Riverstone subdivision.

== Public Transport ==
=== Buses ===
Bus service in Sugar Land is provided by Fort Bend Transit. There are three routes to Downtown Houston, the Texas Medical Center, and the Greenway Plaza. Bus routes use Interstate 69 to get into downtown.

=== Microtransit ===
Via Transportation provides microtransit services throughout the city. The program was launched in march 2025 as a way to expand public transport in the city. Currently, vans operate Monday to Saturday every week. There are plans to expand microtransit service to more of the surrounding area.

== Airport ==
Sugar Land Regional Airport (formerly Sugar Land Municipal Airport) was purchased from a private interest in 1990 by the city of Sugar Land. Sugar Land Regional is the fourth largest airport within the Houston–Sugar Land–Baytown Metropolitan Area. The airport handles approximately 350 aircraft operations per day.

The airport today mostly serves the area's general aviation (GA) aircraft. A new 20,000 square foot (1,900 m^{2}) Terminal and a 60-acre (243,000 m^{2}) GA complex were completed in Spring 2006. Sugar Land Regional briefly handled commercial passenger service during the mid-1990s via a now-defunct Texas carrier known as Conquest Airlines. For scheduled commercial service, Sugar Landers rely on Houston's two commercial airports, George Bush Intercontinental Airport (IAH), 45 miles northeast, and William P. Hobby Airport (HOU), 30 miles east.

The city of Houston maintains a park that occupies 750 acres (3 km^{2}) of land directly north of the Sugar Land Regional Airport and Sugar Land homeowners have built houses directly south of the airport, both factors that block airport expansion.
