= Southwest Inn fire =

2013 fire in Houston, Texas

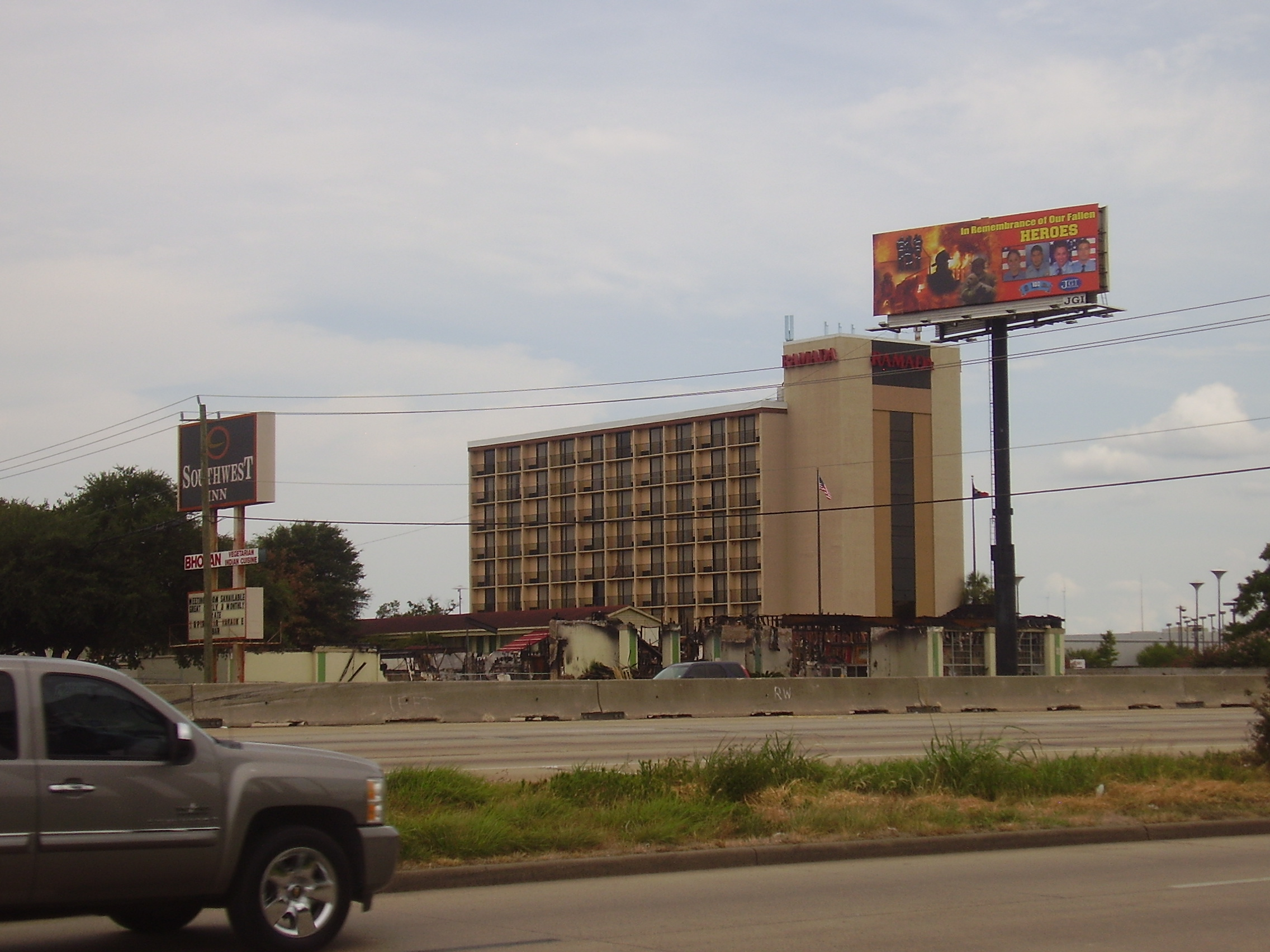
- Southwest Inn after the fire
- Date: May 31, 2013
- Venue: Southwest Inn
- Location: Houston, Texas; 29.711046°N 95.503516°W
- Type: Fire
- Deaths: 5 firefighters
- Injuries: 12 firefighters

The Southwest Inn fire in Houston, Texas on May 31, 2013 was a fire in an Indian restaurant that spread to an adjoining hotel. The fire claimed the biggest casualty loss for the Houston Fire Department since its inception. Four firefighters were killed and 13 others were injured that day while fighting the five-alarm fire at the Southwest Inn located in Southwest Houston. On March 7, 2017, Captain Bill Dowling, who lost both his legs battling the fire in 2013, died of complications (pneumonia or cellulitis) from his line-of-duty injuries.

== Southwest Inn ==
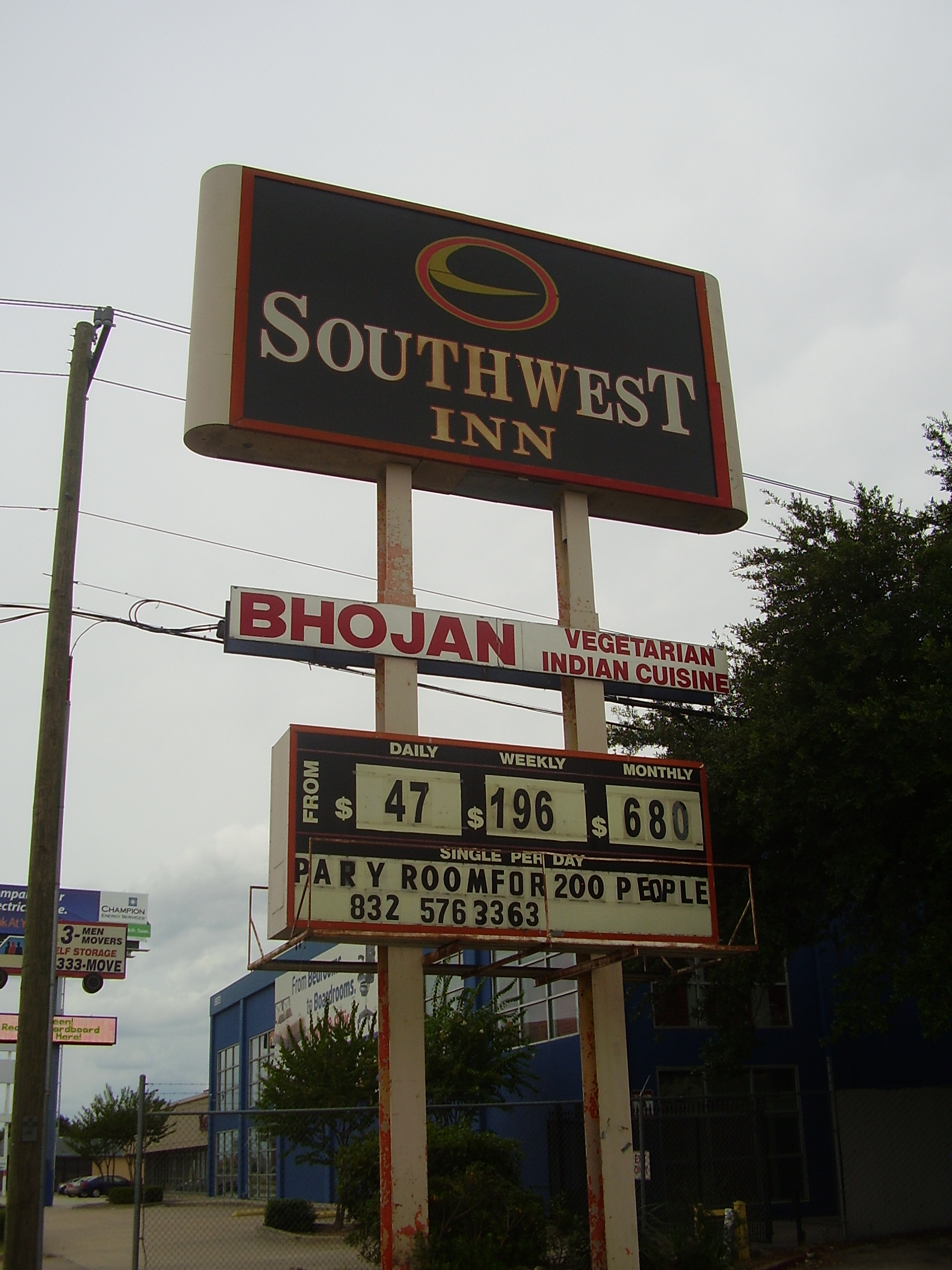
The hotel's sign

The Southwest Inn was located in the Greater Sharpstown district of Southwest Houston, along a portion of Interstate 69 "Southwest Freeway". The hotel was previously called the Roadrunner Inn. It was owned by Criterium Systems, Incorporated, a company in California. An Indian resurant called "Bhojan" was attached to the hotel. The restaurant described itself as a Gujarati-style thali vegetarian restaurant. The hotel could hold up to 100 guests. Some people used the hotel as a rooming house and stayed there for months at a time.

Since 2009, according to fire inspection records, the hotel had received citations for issues in the overall fire alarm system: broken smoke detectors in several rooms, issues with fire suppression systems, expired permits, and obstructed exits. In 2011 HFD's database stated that the hotel was "in compliance" with regulations. In 2012 additional citations appeared on the HFD database. City of Houston inspectors had also cited the restaurant for violations. The restaurant's most recent citation was in March 2013 for failure to clean grease traps. On May 8, 2013, the final inspection of the hotel property stated there was "no action required."

== Fire ==
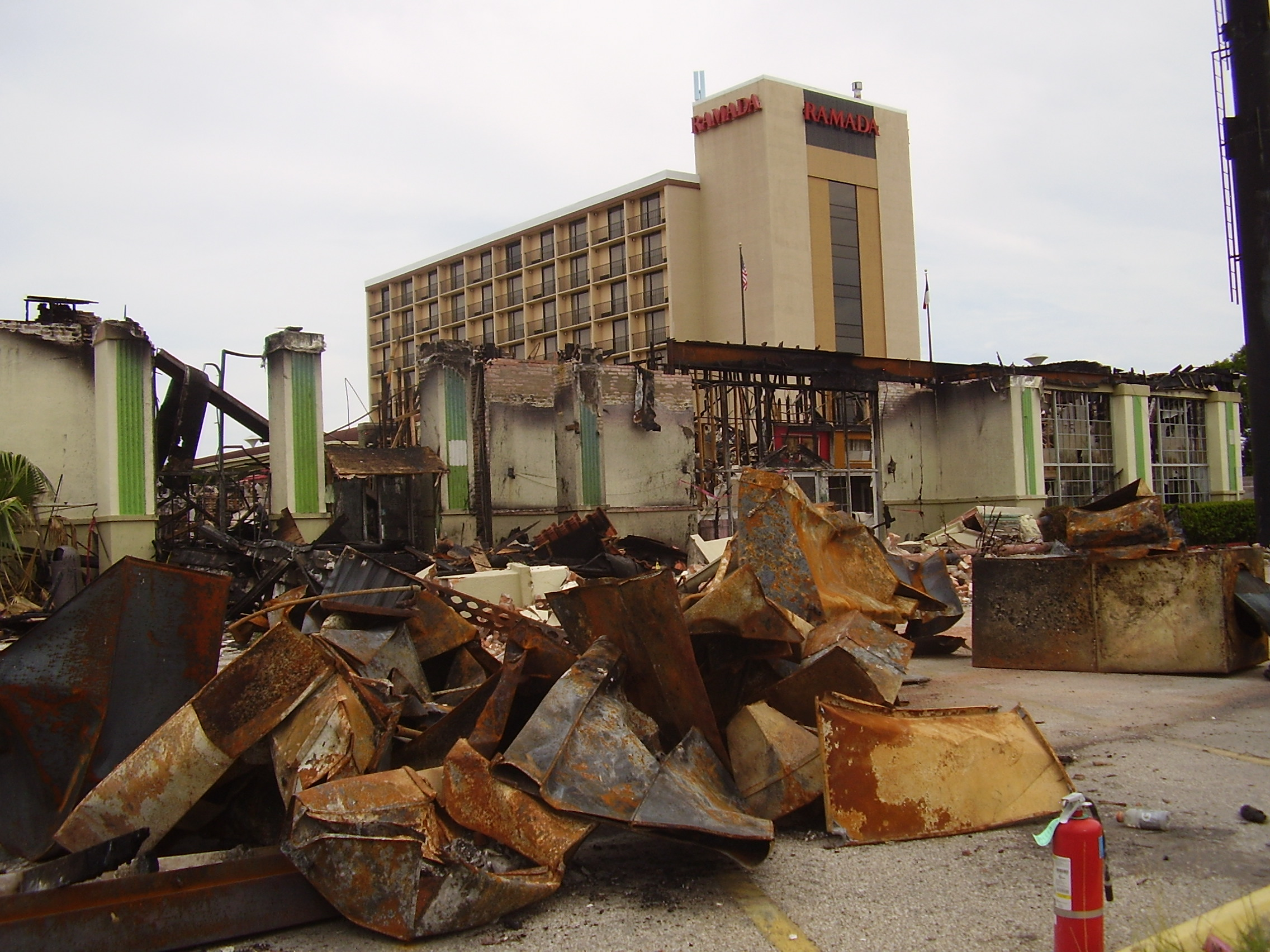
Remains of the hotel

The fire was first reported at 12:09 PM CST on May 31, 2013 in the Bhojan Indian restaurant, during its lunch service. At the time of the fire, 45 guests were registered at the hotel. The front desk clerk and another hotel employee began knocking on doors and windows in the hotel, alerting customers that there was a fire and they needed to evacuate. Twenty HFD vehicles arrived at the scene with lights flashing, including fire trucks and ambulances. The four fatalities occurred twelve minutes after the arrival of the first engine, when the roof collapsed.

The hotel's roof had collapsed in the course of the fire. Firefighters, believing that people were trapped inside, entered the building. Two of the deceased were from Station 51 and two were from Station 68. The fire also caused injuries to 14 additional firefighters; one fell into a coma and another required leg amputation.

The four firefighters who died in 2013 were Robert Bebee, Robert Garner, Matthew Renaud, and Anne Sullivan.

== Aftermath ==
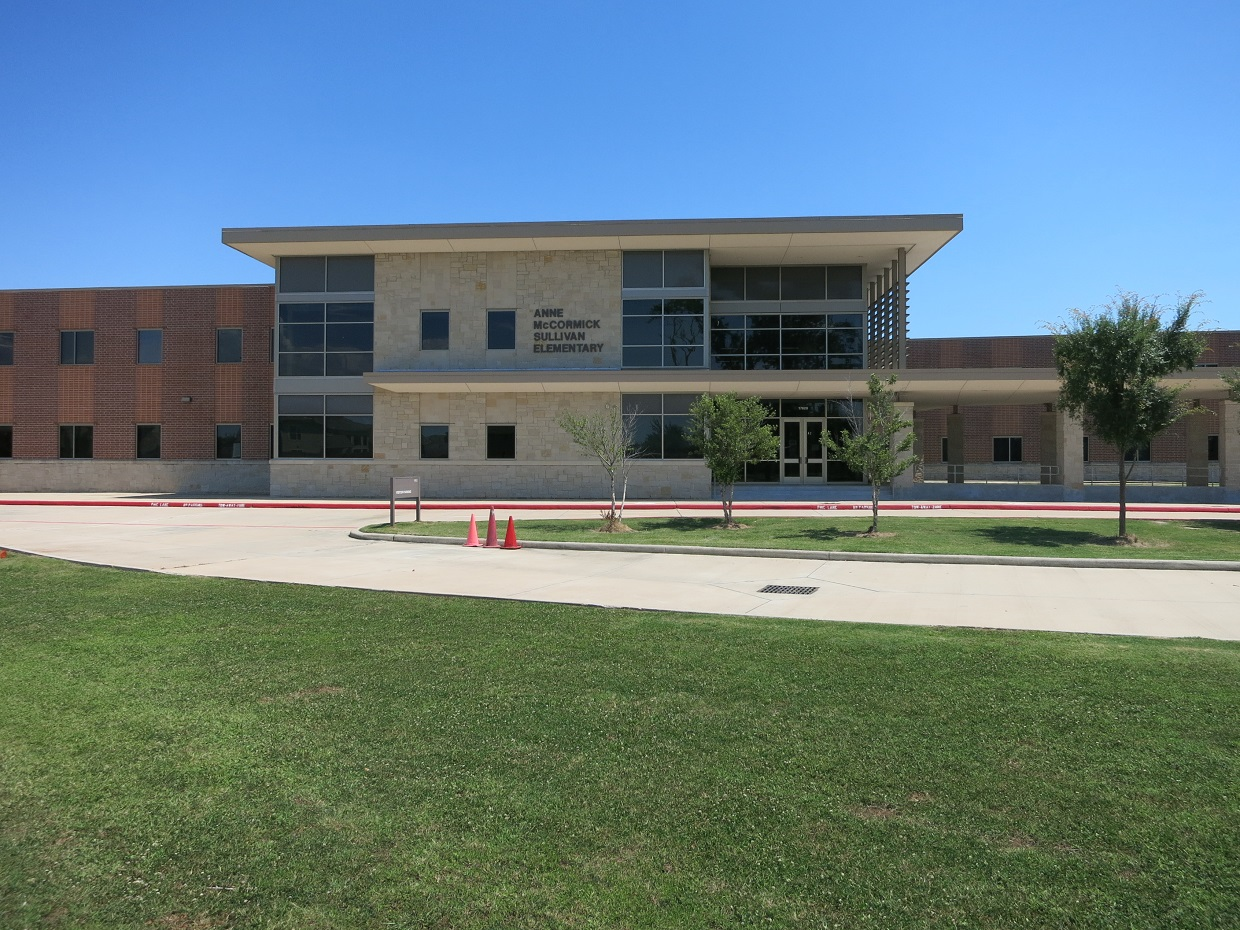
Anne McCormick Sullivan Elementary School in Riverstone, Texas was named after a firefighter who died in the Southwest Inn fire

The four bodies were taken via ambulances to the Harris County Institute of Forensic Science. Once autopsies were completed, they were taken to local funeral homes. The fire was investigated by the HFD, with assistance from the Bureau of Alcohol, Tobacco, Firearms and Explosives (ATF). A total of 50 investigators from city, state, and federal agencies helped.

The long-term patrons at the Southwest Inn were displaced by the fire. The area Plainfield Inn donated rentals of twenty rooms for their short-term recovery stays.

The memorial services for the deceased were scheduled to be held at Reliant Stadium on Wednesday June 5, 2013. Captain William "Iron Bill" Dowling, who had lost both legs in the roof collapse, died on March 7, 2017, from complications related to his injuries from the fire. A memorial service was held on March 15, 2017.

In June 2015 the National Institute for Occupational Safety and Health (NIOSH) released their final report and found eight contributing factors to the death of the firefighters, including:

- Fire burning unreported for three hours
- Delayed notification to the fire department
- Building construction
- Wind impacted fire
- Scene size-up
- Personnel accountability
- Fire ground communications
- Lack of fire sprinkler system

Anne McCormick Sullivan Elementary School, in the Riverstone community and in unincorporated Fort Bend County, was named after one of the firefighters. It is a part of the Fort Bend Independent School District.

In 2018 a lawyer accused Motorola of being responsible for mistakes in the radio network and that they contributed to the deaths. Families of the four firefighters immediately killed filed a lawsuit against Motorola. In 2019 the wife of Dowling filed a lawsuit against Motorola.
