= Riverstone, Texas =

Planned community in Texas, US

Riverstone
- Master-Planned Community
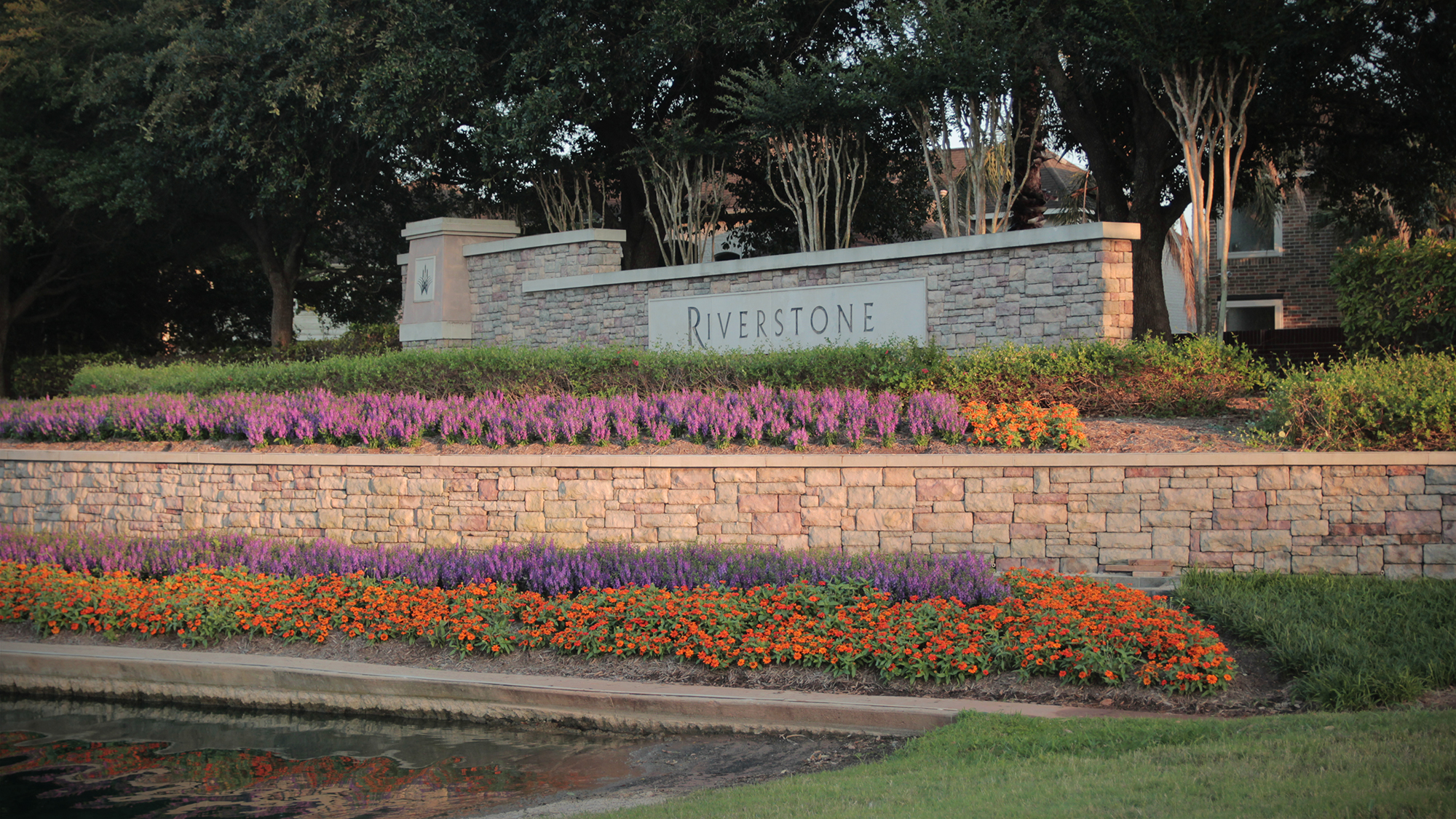
- Riverstone entry sign at University Boulevard's terminus at Texas State Highway 6

- Coordinates: 29.54847°N 95.58381°W
- Country: United States
- State: Texas
- County: Fort Bend County
- City: Sugar Land and Missouri City
- Construction started: 2001
- Founder: Johnson Development Corporation
- Neighborhoods: List: Avalon at Riverstone; The Villas; Prestwick; Olive Hill; Alden Springs; Marble Bend; Whisper Rock; Pecan Ridge; Auburn Manor; Silver Grove; Waterside; Vintage Trail; Majestic Pointe; Sanders Glen; Ivy Bend; Edgewood; Sweetbriar; Orchard; Lost Creek; Millwood; Shadow Glenn; Senova; Kensington; Hartford Landing; Crescent View Estates; Meridian Park; The Island; The Enclave; Auburn Heights; Ivory Ridge; Scenic Bend; Amber Creek; Riverstone North; Crossing Cove; The Retreat; Arista at Riverstone; Stella at Riverstone; Grand Living at Riverstone; Providence; The Crossing; Brookside; Nandina; The Pointe; Waters Cove; The Reserve; The Terrace; The Grove; Creekstone Village; Stonebrook; Pebble Creek; The Club at Riverstone; The Village at Riverstone; Avalon at Riverstone (Hagerson Road)

Area
  - Total: 3,700 acres (1,500 ha)

Population
  - Total: >18,000
  - Density: 3,113.51/sq mi (1,202.13/km^{2})
- ZIP Code: 77459 and 77479

Riverstone is a 3,700-acre (15 km^{2}) upscale master-planned residential community in Fort Bend County, Texas, United States. Approximately 18,000 residents ultimately will live in 6,000 homes. The development is largely located in unincorporated areas that are in extraterritorial jurisdictions (ETJ) of Sugar Land and Missouri City, with portions being in Missouri City proper and strips of land being in Sugar Land proper.

441 houses were sold in Riverstone in 2016. As of 2017, John Burns Real Estate Consulting, a company headquartered in Irvine, California, ranked Riverstone as No. 20 on its list of highest-selling Greater Houston subdivisions, and Robert Charles Lesser & Co. (RCLCO) ranked Riverstone as No. 18 on its top-selling list. John Burns ranked Riverstone among its top 25 in 2018.

== History ==
Riverstone's began development in 2001, with development continuing until the present. It was created by the Johnson Development Corporation. Riverstone's neighborhoods were developed by a series of housing companies such as Taylor Morrison and Meritage Homes.

== Geography ==
The community is mostly located in unincorporated areas, primarily within the extraterritorial jurisdictions of the cities of Sugar Land and Missouri City. A portion is in Missouri City itself. Much of the early development (some 500 homes) was in the Missouri City ETJ portion, but about 60% of the total land area and most of the future homes will be in Sugar Land ETJ.

Riverstone stretches from State Highway 6 on the northeast to the Brazos River on the southwest. It is bounded on the north by the Bridgewater neighborhood of The Commonwealth master-planned community in Sugar Land, the Lakes of Austin Park, and Heritage Colony neighborhoods of First Colony in Sugar Land and Missouri City respectively, and Sugar Land's Maranatha Farms. To the east are First Colony's Colony Lakes neighborhood and the Sienna Village neighborhoods of Sienna, both in Missouri City, and Sugar Land's Pecan Manor is adjacent to part of the south boundary.

Riverstone falls into ZIP codes 77459 and 77479, respectively served by the Missouri City and Sugar Land post offices. Some of the Missouri City properties fall into the latter ZIP code, thus having Sugar Land mailing addresses.

The primary thoroughfares are University Boulevard, which connects the community with the Southwest Freeway (U.S 59/I-69) through the Avalon and Brazos Landing communities in the west and State Highway 6 in the east, LJ Parkway, which connects it to The Commonwealth and First Colony in the north and Sienna in the south, and Riverstone Boulevard in the northeast, which connects it to First Colony in the west and Highway 6 in the east. Oilfield Road is also located in the southeast, which links it with some of the Colony Lakes neighborhoods of First Colony.

== Economy ==
The area of Riverstone that borders Highway 6 and around the intersection of University Boulevard and LJ Parkway are dominated by large-scale commercial developments. The intersection around University Boulevard and LJ Parkway is home to the Stella at Riverstone, a large commercial development with strip malls, restaurants, a 100,000 square foot Kroger, and other developments. Additionally, there are two strip malls adjacent to the Villas neighborhood and in the Avalon at Riverstone development. An office district is located in the northeast off of Riverstone Boulevard.

== Parks and recreation ==
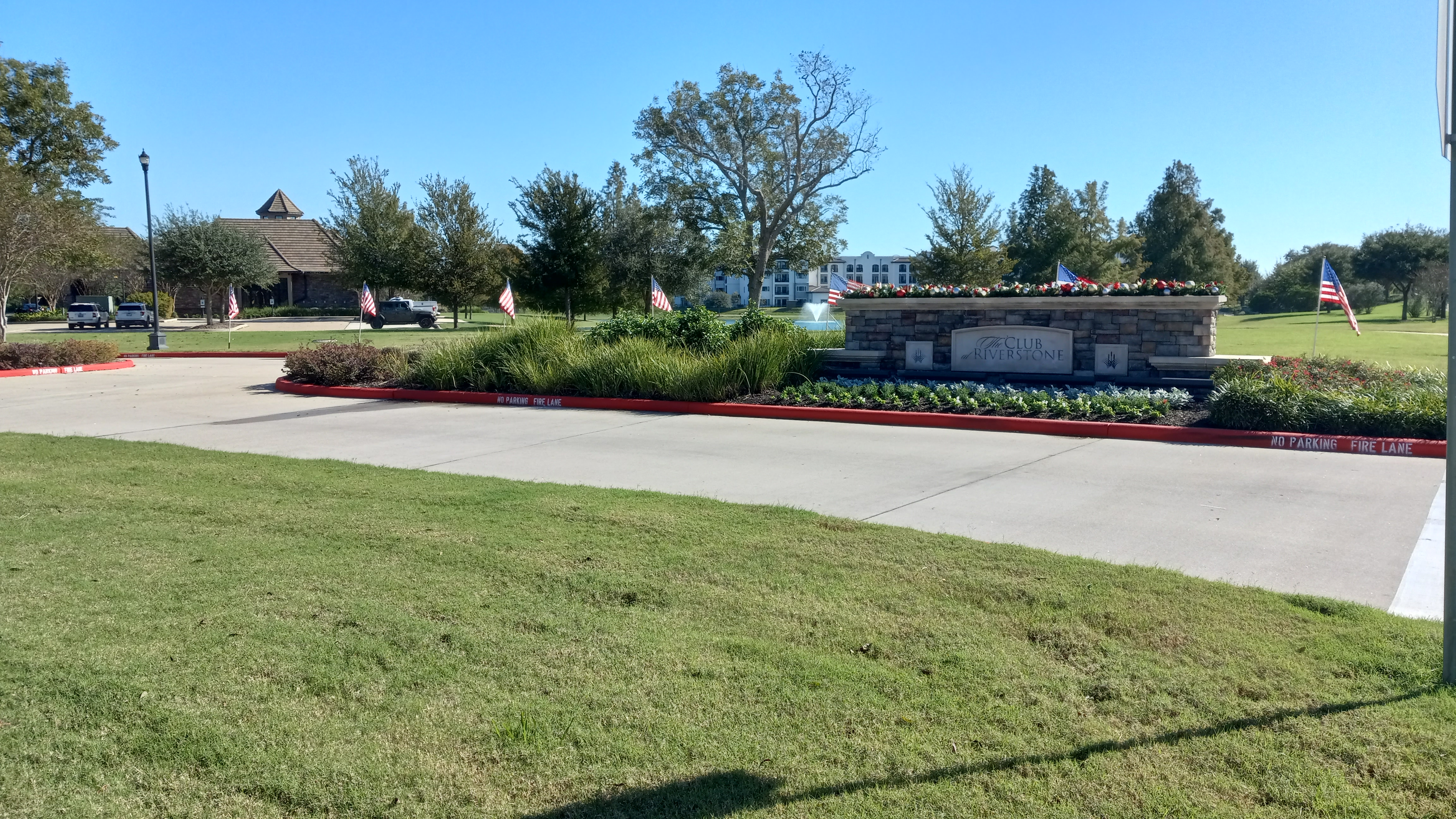
The Club at Riverstone

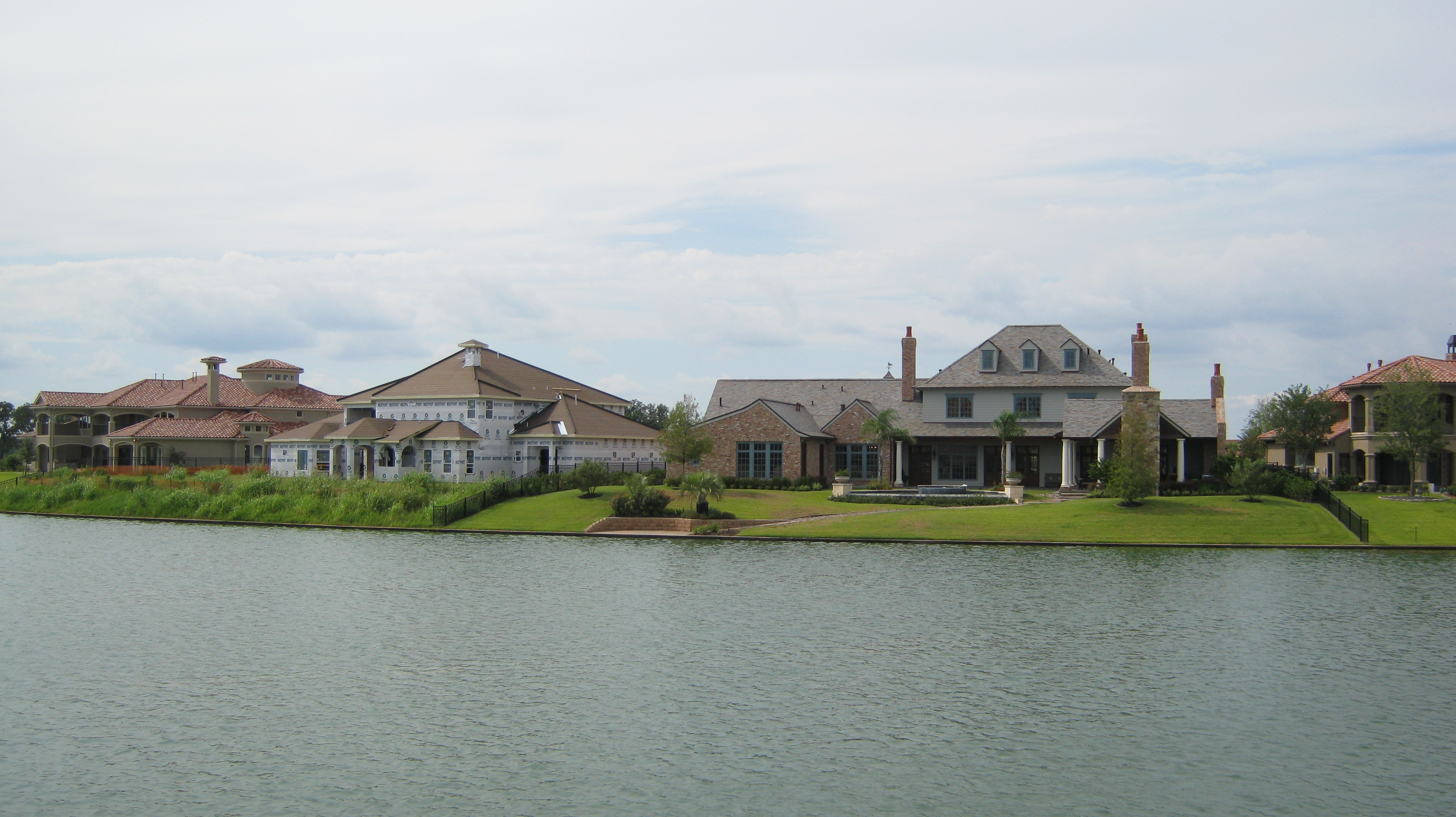
Riverstone is well known for its artificial lakes, with many higher end neighborhoods (such as the Crescent Lakes, pictured here while under construction in February 2010) featuring properties lined up on their banks.

Riverstone is well known for its numerous artificial lakes, which dot its neighborhoods and cityscape. The community has well over 200 acres (0.81 km^{2}) of lakes and contains numerous waterfront homes. Parks are spread throughout Riverstone, with many having facilities such as playgrounds. Additionally, there is a 3.5-acre (0.014 km^{2}) dog park. In total, there are 500 acres (2.0 km^{2}) of recreational space, walking trails, parks, and open spaces. The major recreational center at Riverstone is the Club at Riverstone, which contains a 8,000-square-foot (0.00074 km^{2}) clubhouse that contains a fitness center and a meeting room, eight tennis courts, a water park (which serves as the community's third pool complex), and playground. Parks are planned on much of the remaining south boundary (beyond the levees protecting against high water along the Brazos River).

== Education ==
=== Primary and secondary schools ===
Riverstone is located entirely within the Fort Bend Independent School District (FBISD). Until 2016, Riverstone had no on site schools, with the community being zoned to areas outside the community. Early plans called for the construction of three elementary schools and an additional middle school.

Anne McCormick Sullivan Elementary School opened in Riverstone in August 2016, making it Riverstone's first school. Its namesake was a firefighter who died in the Southwest Inn fire in 2013. Regarding elementary schools, other sections are zoned to Austin Parkway (First Colony, Sugar Land), Commonwealth (The Commonwealth, Sugar Land), and Settlers Way (Fist Colony, Sugar Land) elementary schools. Previously Schiff Elementary School in Sienna Plantation served the Stonebrook subdivision. Sonal Bhuchar Elementary School opened in 2023 as Riverstone's second consecutive on site school.

First Colony Middle School in First Colony and Fort Settlement Middle School in Avalon serve Riverstone, with the former serving the east and the latter the west. Previously Baines Middle School in Sienna served the Stonebrook subdivision.

Elkins High School in Missouri City serves all of Riverstone. Previously Clements High School in First Colony served some sections of Riverstone.

In 2014 FBISD proposed rezoning portions of the community to First Colony Middle School from Fort Settlement Middle School, prompting some area parents to protest the plan.

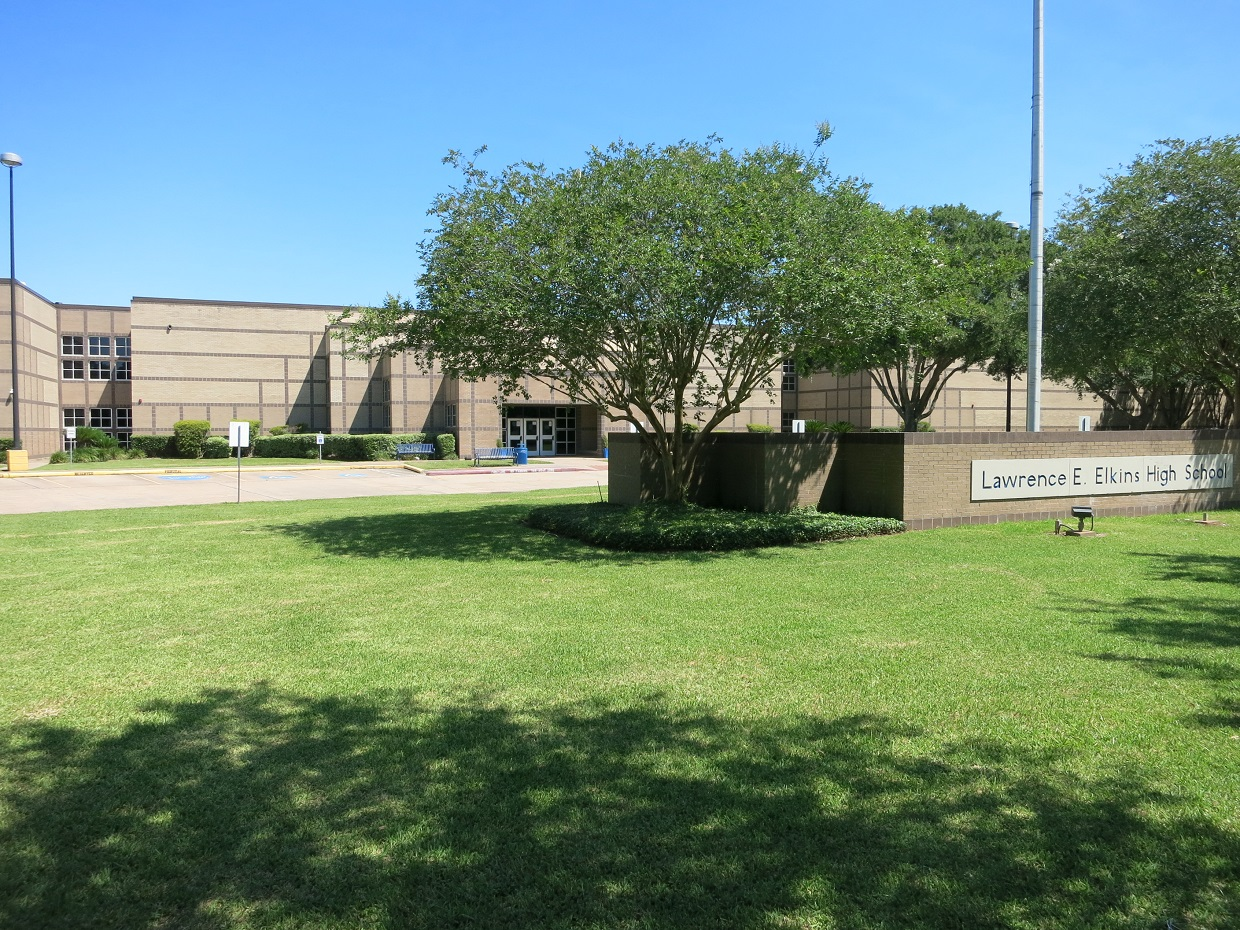
Elkins High School

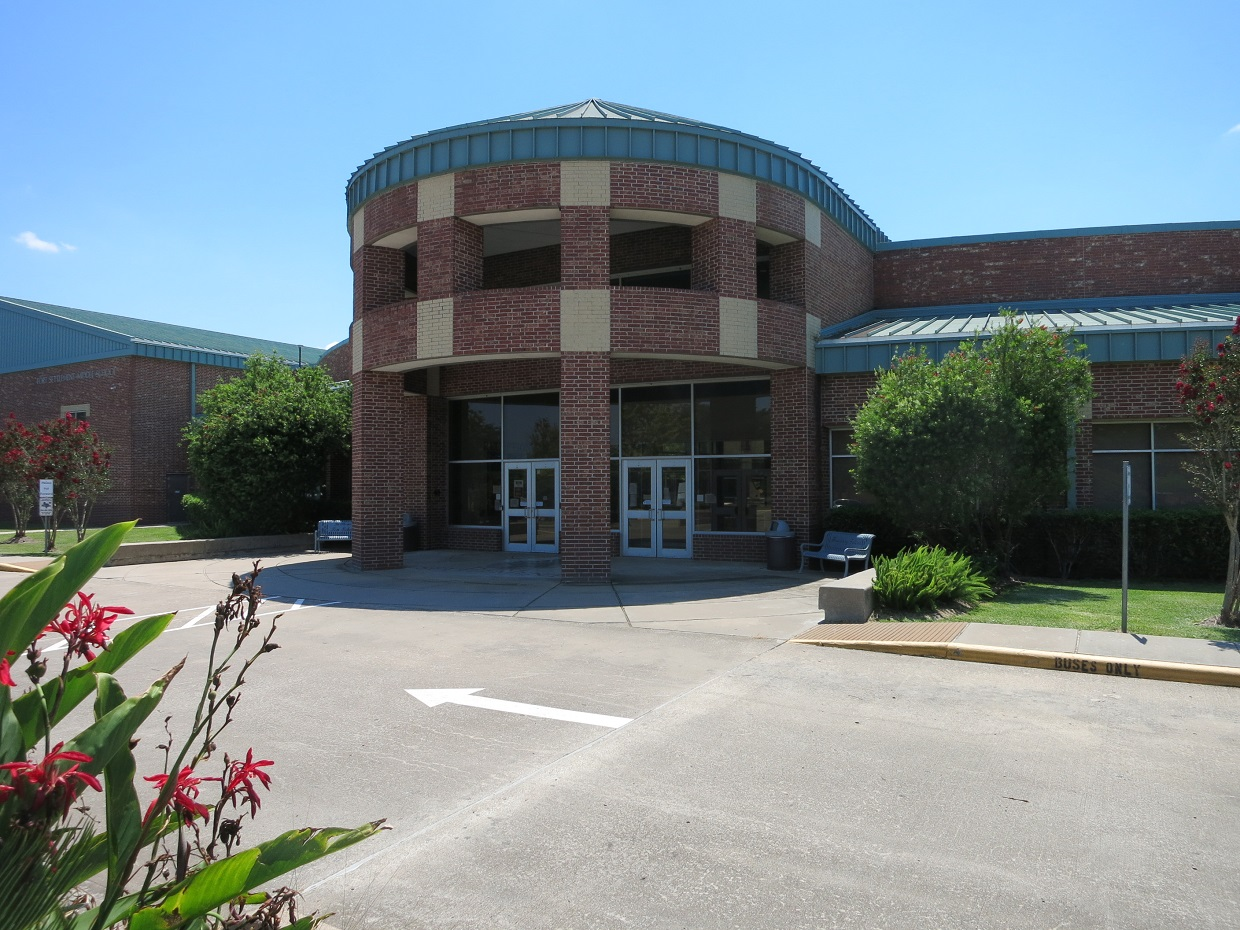
Fort Settlement Middle School

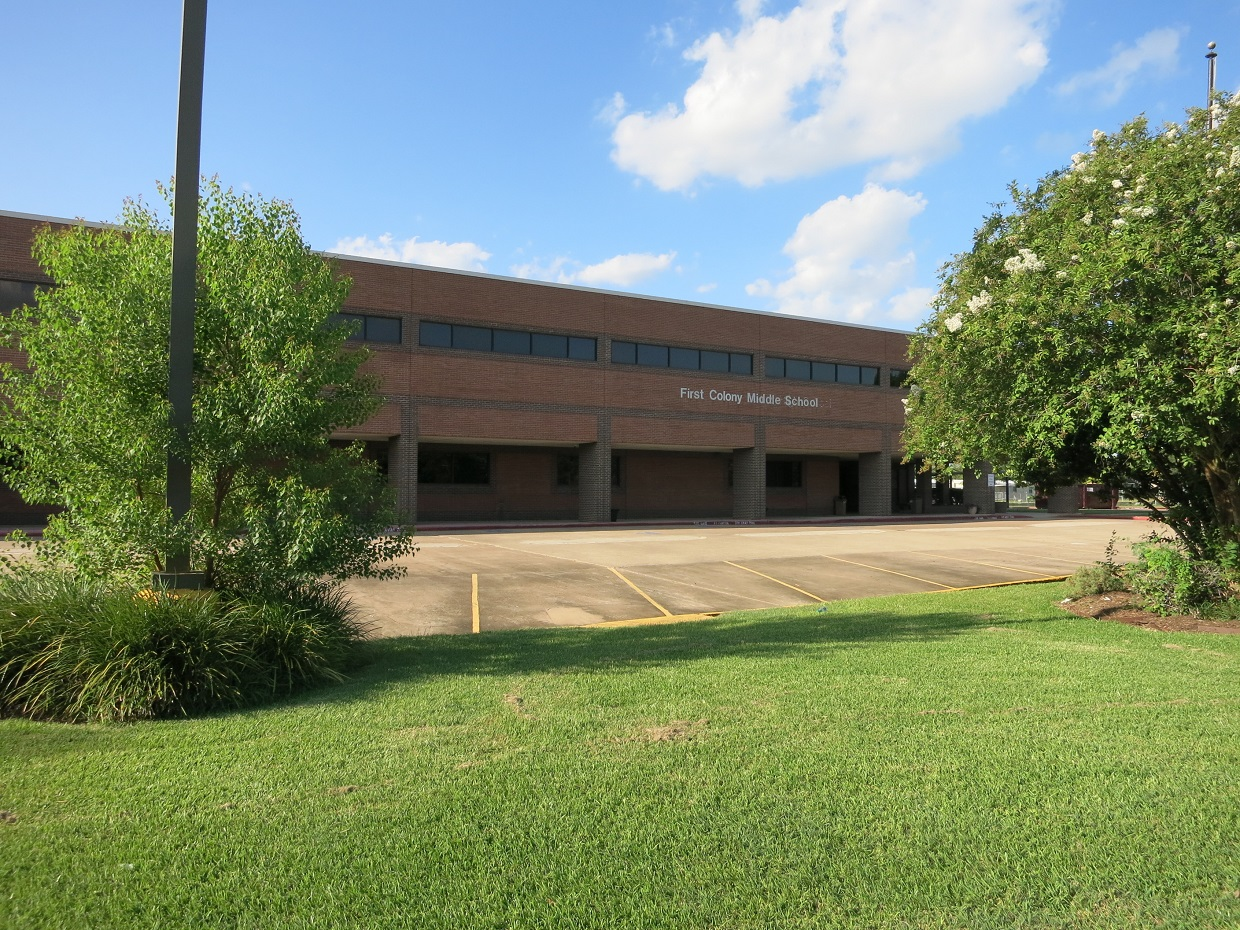
First Colony Middle School

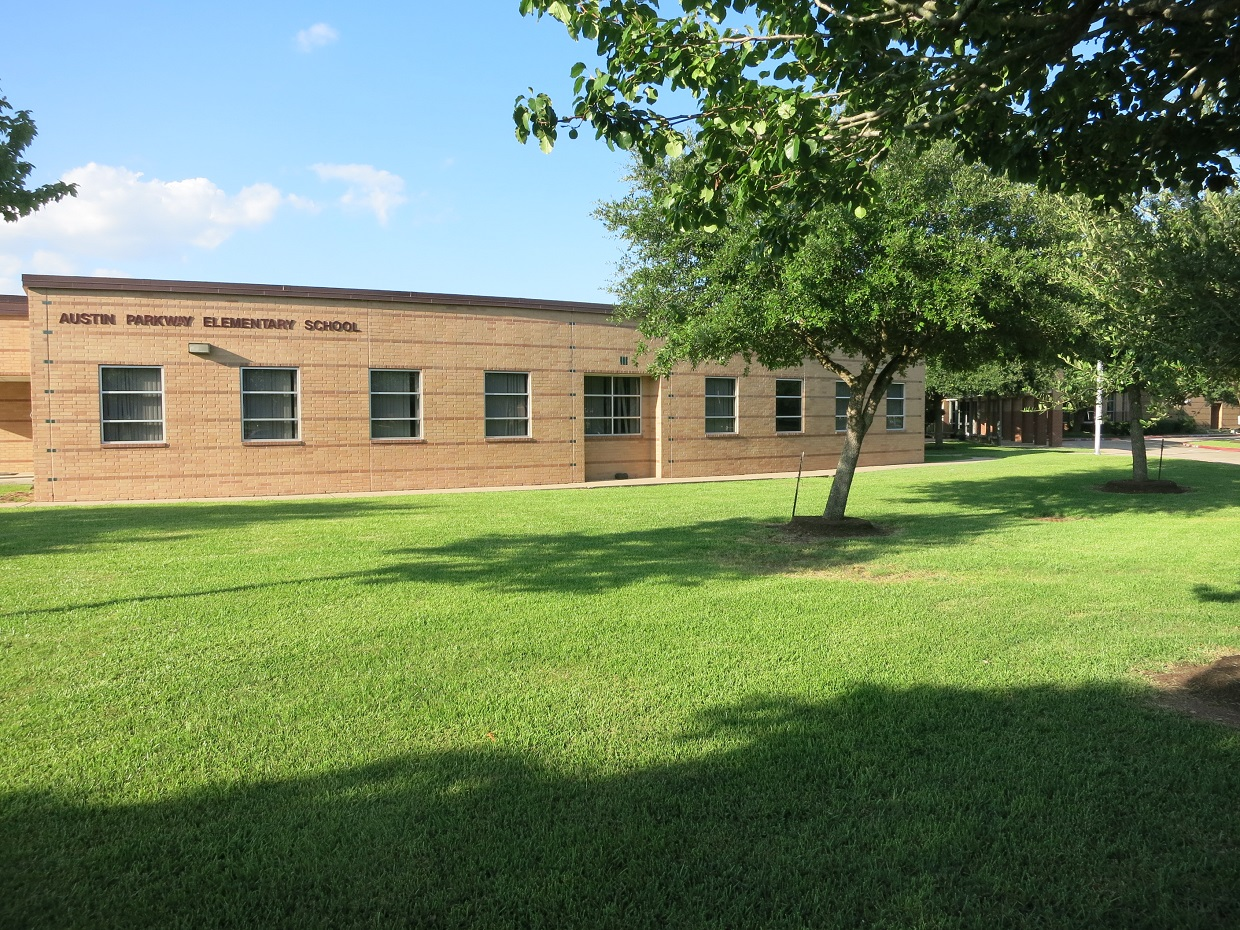
Austin Parkway Elementary School

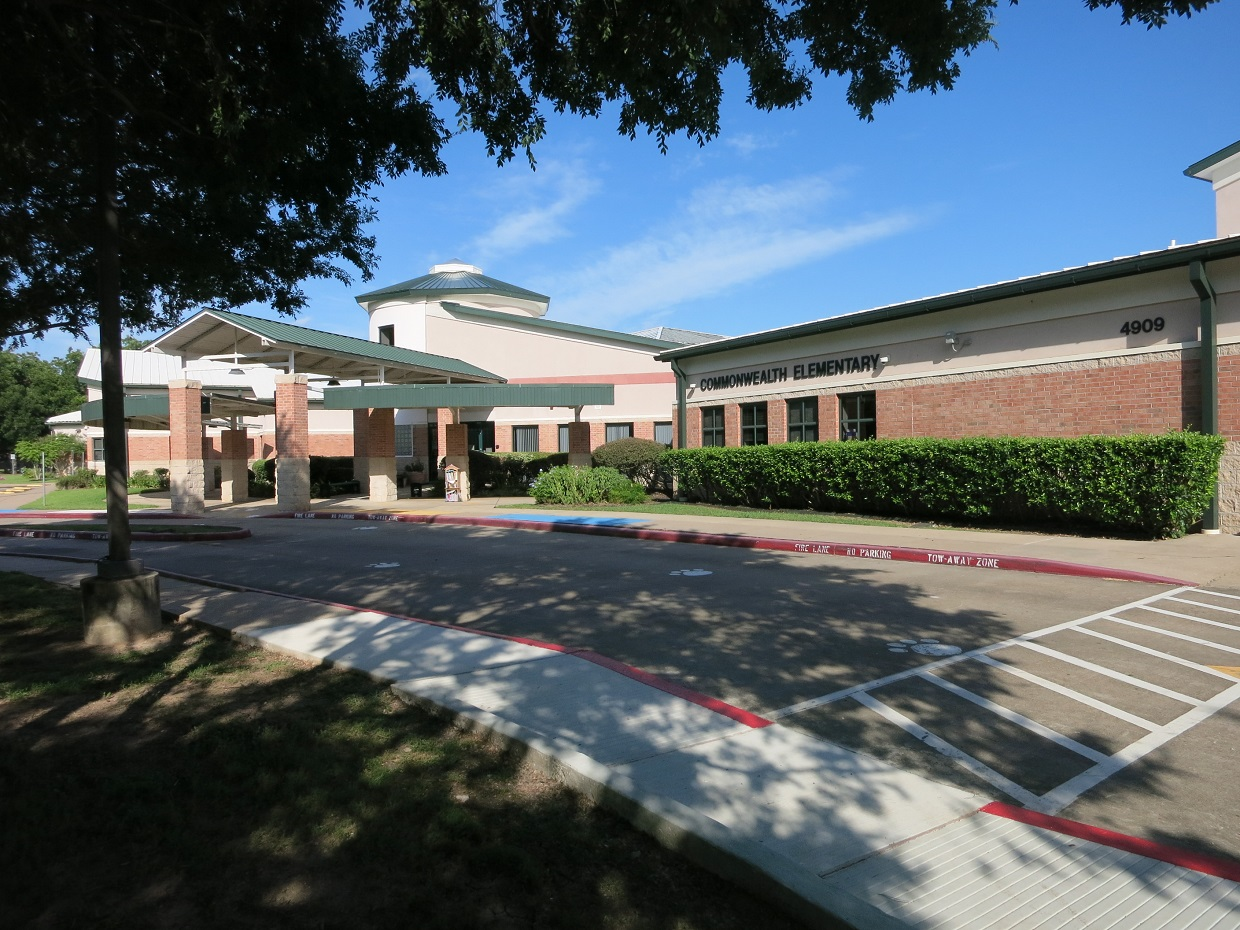
Commonwealth Elementary School

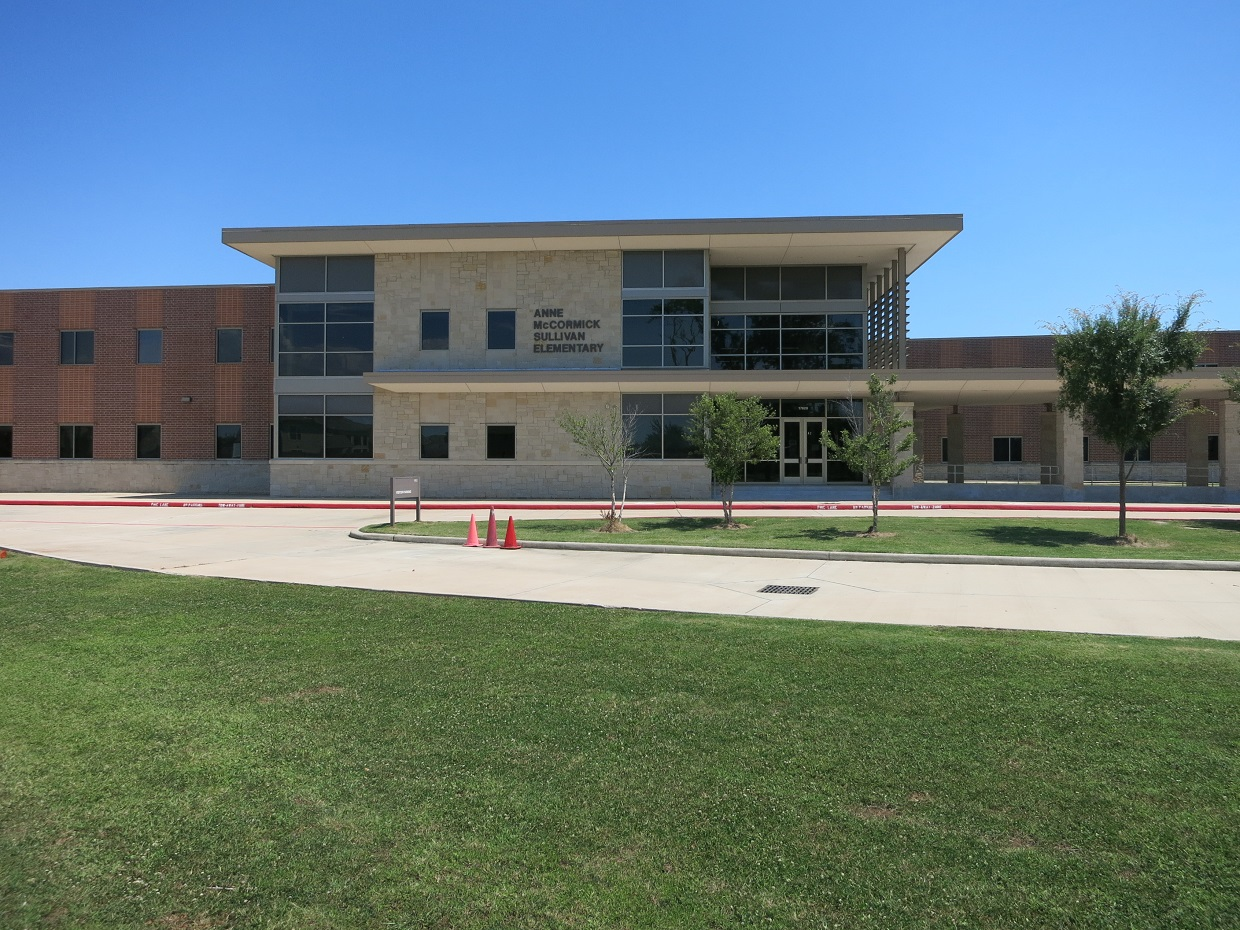
Anne Sullivan Elementary School

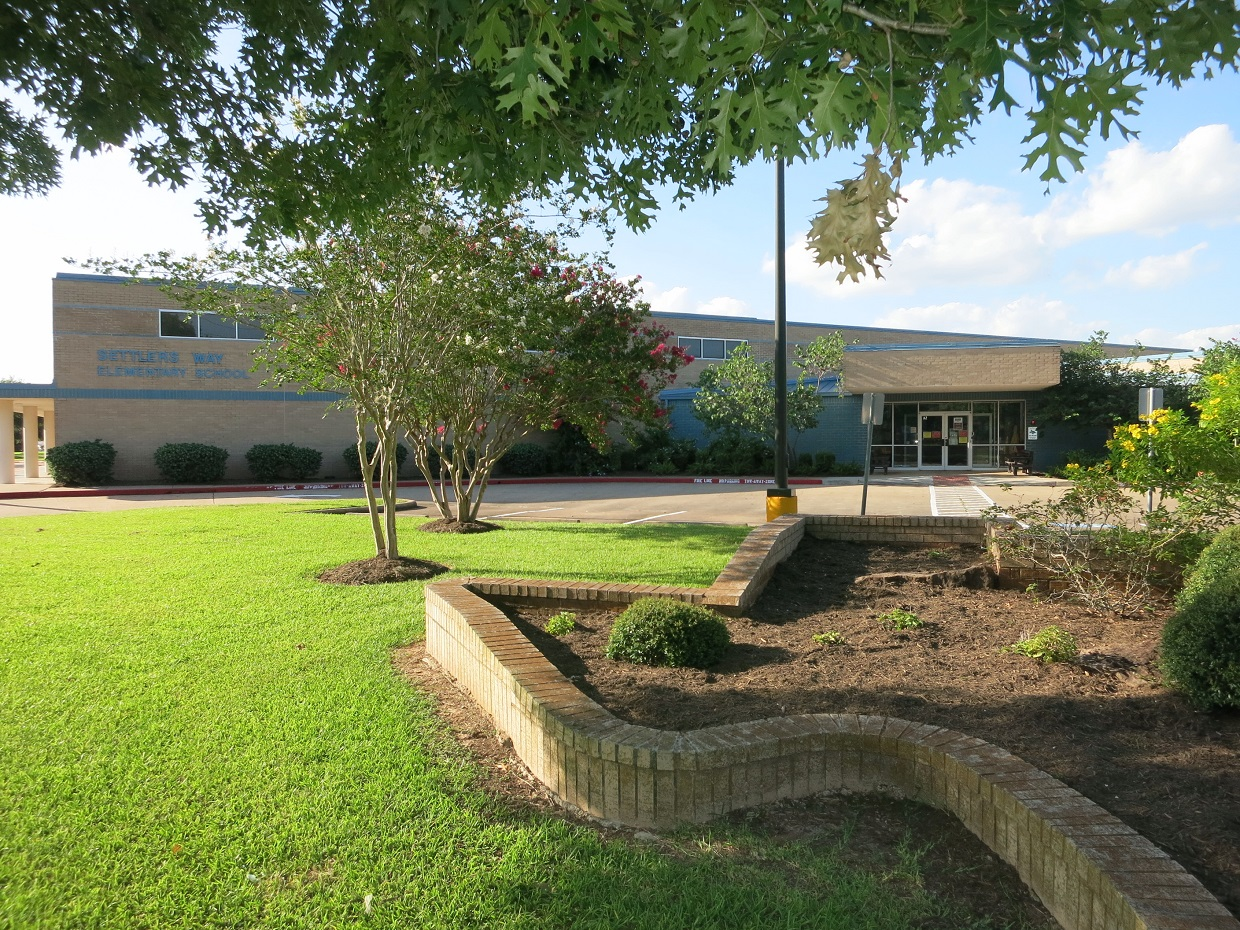
Settlers Way Elementary School

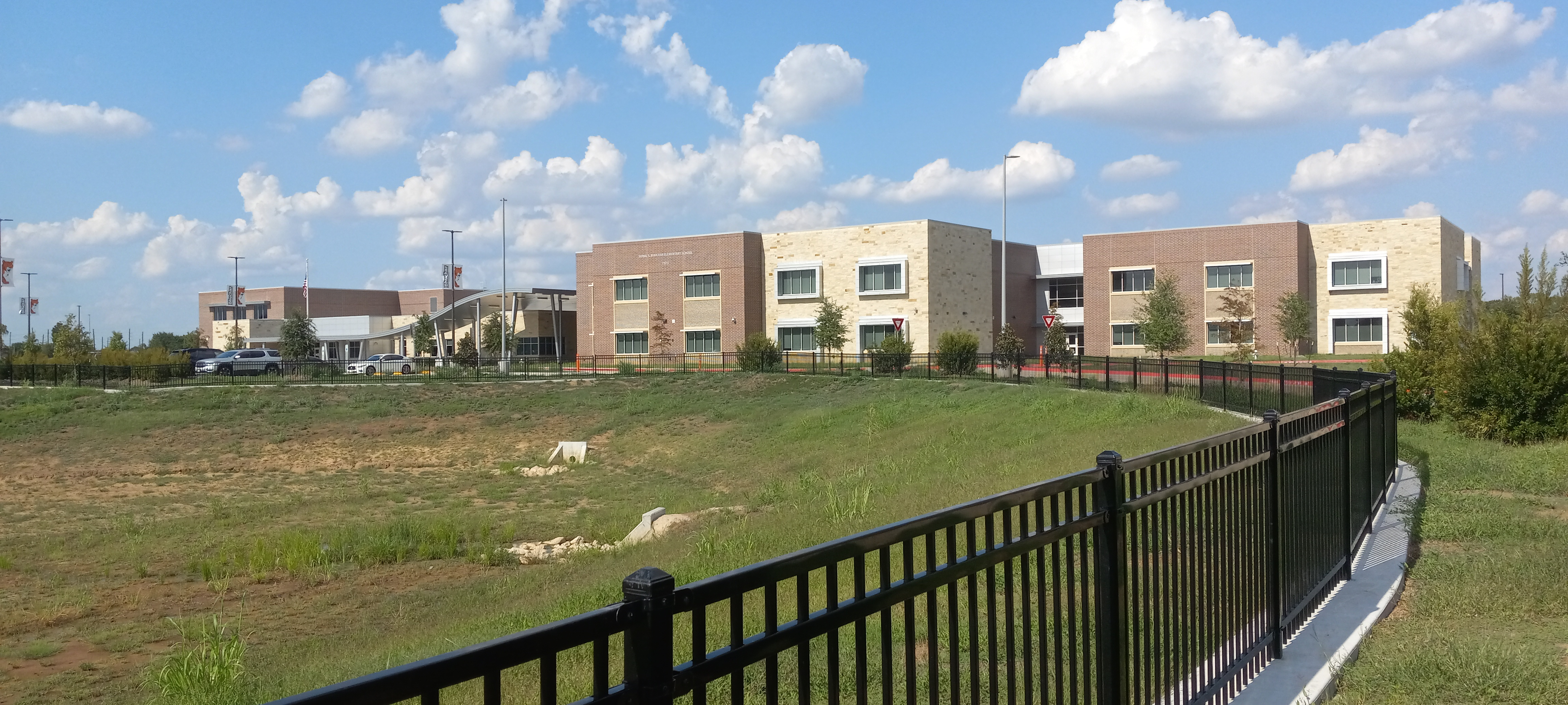
Sonal Buchar Elementary School

=== Colleges and universities ===
The designated community college for areas in Sugar Land proper and the Sugar Land extraterritorial jurisdiction is Wharton County Junior College.

The Texas Legislature specifies that the Houston Community College (HCC) boundary includes "the part of the Fort Bend Independent School District that is not located in the service area of the Wharton County Junior College District and that is adjacent to the Houston Community College System District." Wharton College's boundary within FBISD is defined only as the City of Sugar Land and the ETJ of Sugar Land, and part of Riverstone is in Missouri City proper and Missouri City ETJ. The Missouri City/Missouri City ETJ parts of Riverstone are in HCC.
