= Lamar Consolidated Independent School District =

School district in Texas, United States

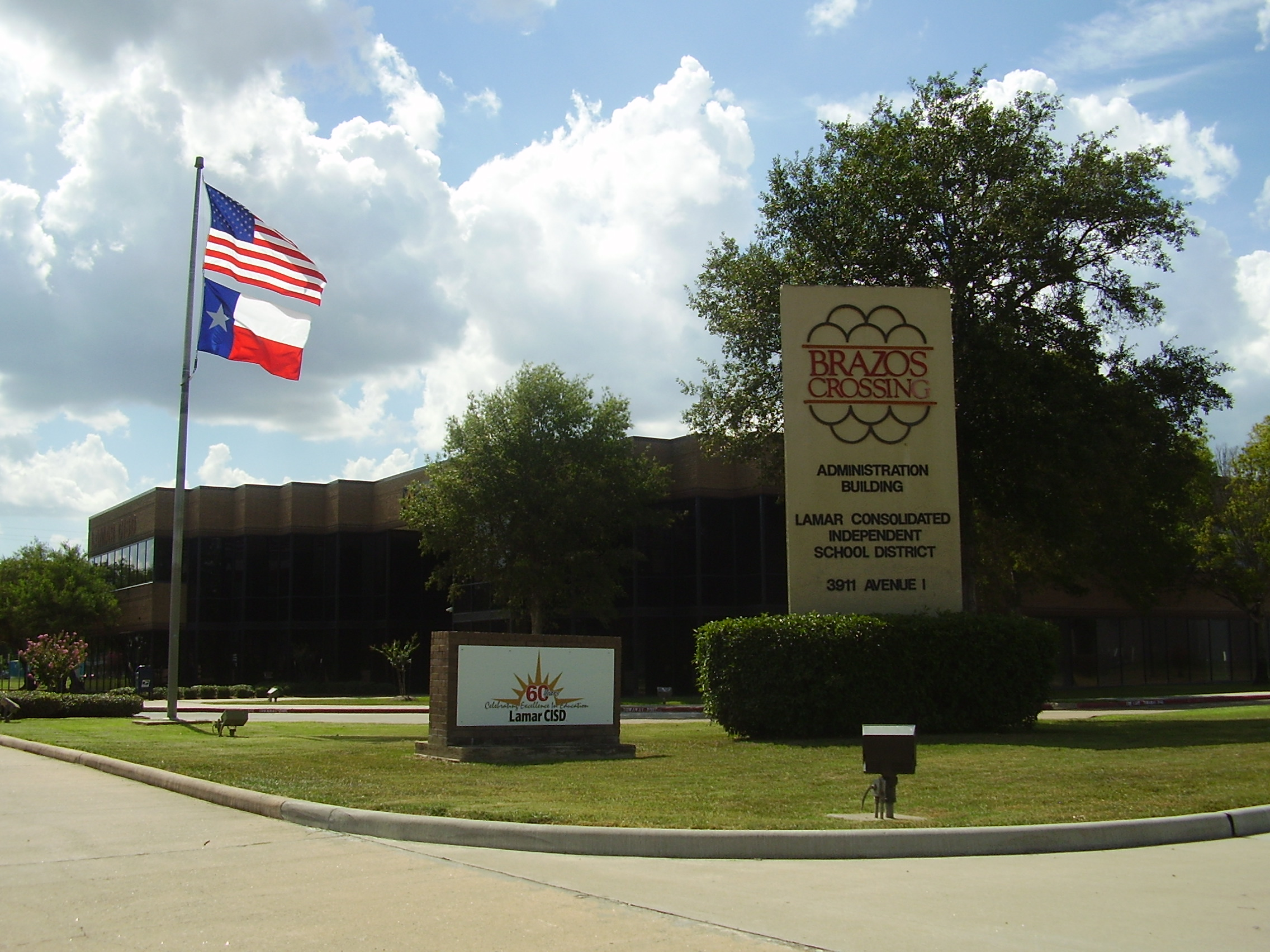
- Brazos Crossing, the district headquarters

Address
- 3911 Avenue I Rosenberg, Fort Bend County, Texas, 77471; United States
- Coordinates: 29.5578°N 95.7863°W

District information
- Motto: A proud tradition, a bright future
- Superintendent: Dr. Roosevelt Nivens (2021 - current)
- School board: James Steenbergen (Pres), Kathryn Kaminski (VP), Kay Danziger (Secr), Joe Hubenak, Dr. Tyson Harrell, Melisa Roberts, Mandi Bronsell
- NCES District ID: 4826580

Students and staff
- Students: 44,512 (2023–2024)
- Teachers: 2,353.06 (on an FTE basis) (2023–2024)
- Staff: 2,449.72 (on an FTE basis) (2023–2024)
- Student–teacher ratio: 18.92 (2023–2024)

Other information
- Website: www.lcisd.org

Lamar Consolidated Independent School District, also Lamar Consolidated ISD, Lamar CISD or LCISD, is a public school district in the U.S. state of Texas within the Houston–Sugar Land–Metropolitan Area.

Lamar CISD includes almost 43 percent of Fort Bend County, covering the cities of Richmond, Rosenberg, Kendleton, Simonton, Thompsons, Weston Lakes, a very small portion of Sugar Land, most of Fulshear, most of the village of Pleak, the census-designated place of Cumings, a portion of the Pecan Grove CDP, the community of Lakemont, the unincorporated areas of Booth, Crabb, Foster, and Powell Point, and most of the unincorporated rural areas (including areas in Sugar Land's extraterritorial jurisdiction (ETJ) in central Fort Bend County.

Lamar CISD enrolls over 44,000 students and is the fastest-growing district in Fort Bend County. In 2013 it received the highest possible academic rating (Met Standard) from the Texas Education Agency.

Dr. Roosevelt Nivens began his tenure as superintendent on June 1, 2021.

The 6th Junior and High School opened in the fall of 2021 with the completion of Dr. Thomas E Randle High School and Harry Wright Junior High School.

The 7th Secondary Complex opened in the fall of 2025, adding Gene Tomas High School, Ella Banks Junior High School, and Bielstein Middle School. Alice Deanne Fagert Elementary School is also on the secondary complex.

== History ==
In 1947 LCISD was first defined in the Fort Bend County public records. It was a consolidation of Richmond ISD, Rosenberg ISD and Beasley ISD along with a number of rural "Common School Districts". The names of the Common School Districts were: Rice Farm, Thompsons, Booth, Simonton, Fulshear, Foster, Brandt, George, Cottonwood & Pleak. Beginning in 1985, LCISD began serving middle and high school students from the Kendleton Independent School District (KISD)'s boundaries. KISD and its one school, Powell Point Elementary, were merged into Lamar CISD on July 1, 2010. KISD ceased operations on that date and LCISD began serving elementary students from the former KISD. Kendleton ISD was originally one Common School District, also called Kendleton. In 2009, Lamar CISD was named an H.E.B. Excellence in Education School District.

Dr. Thomas Randle served as the district superintendent from 2001 until his retirement in 2021. During his tenure, LCISD grew from approximately 16,000 students to 34,000 students.

There were 36,345 students in 2020, and 44,385 students in 2024.

== List of schools ==
High schools (grades 9-12)
Name	Established	Location	Mascot	Track	Additional information
Lamar Consolidated High School	1949	Rosenburg	Mustangs	Blue	
John and Randolph Foster High School	2001	Richmond ETJ	Falcons	Gold	
George Ranch High School	2010	Richmond ETJ	Longhorns	Maroon	
Fulshear High School	2016	Fulshear	Chargers	Purple	
Randle High School	2021	Richmond ETJ	Lions	Silver	
B. F. Terry High School	1982	Rosenburg	Rangers	Red	
Tomas High School	2025	Richmond ETJ	Gators	Green	

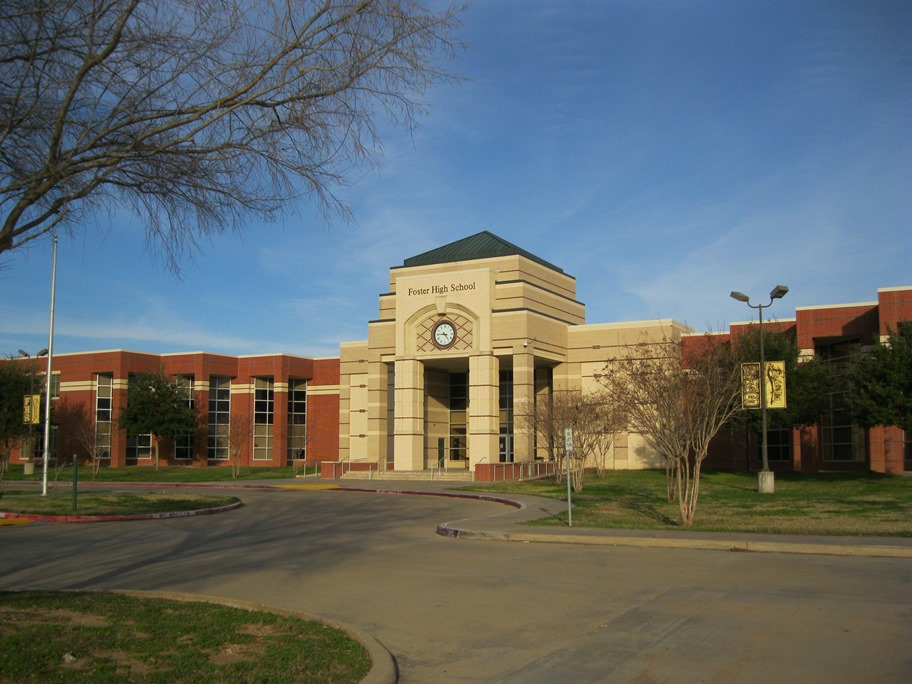
John and Randolph Foster High School

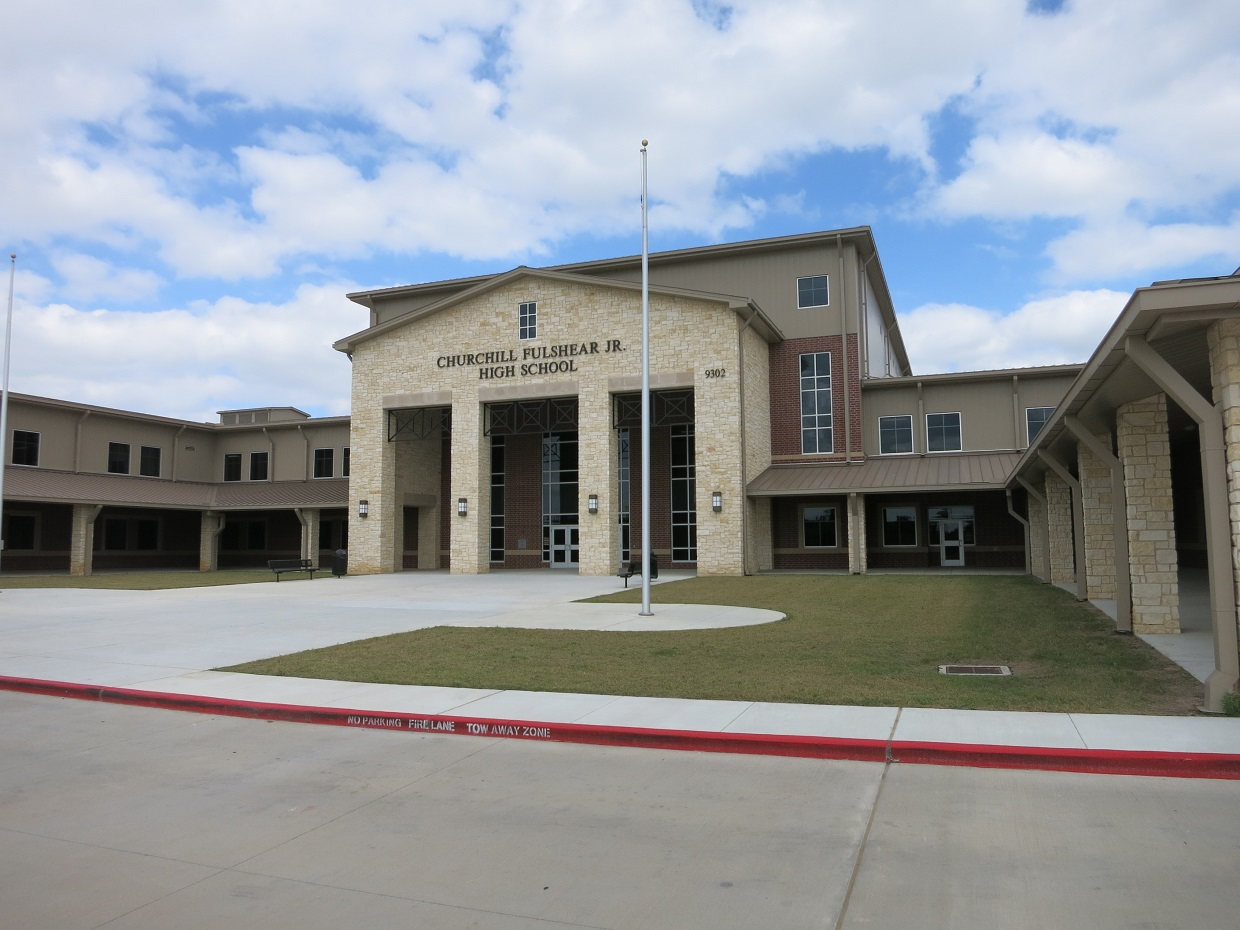
Churchill Fulshear High School

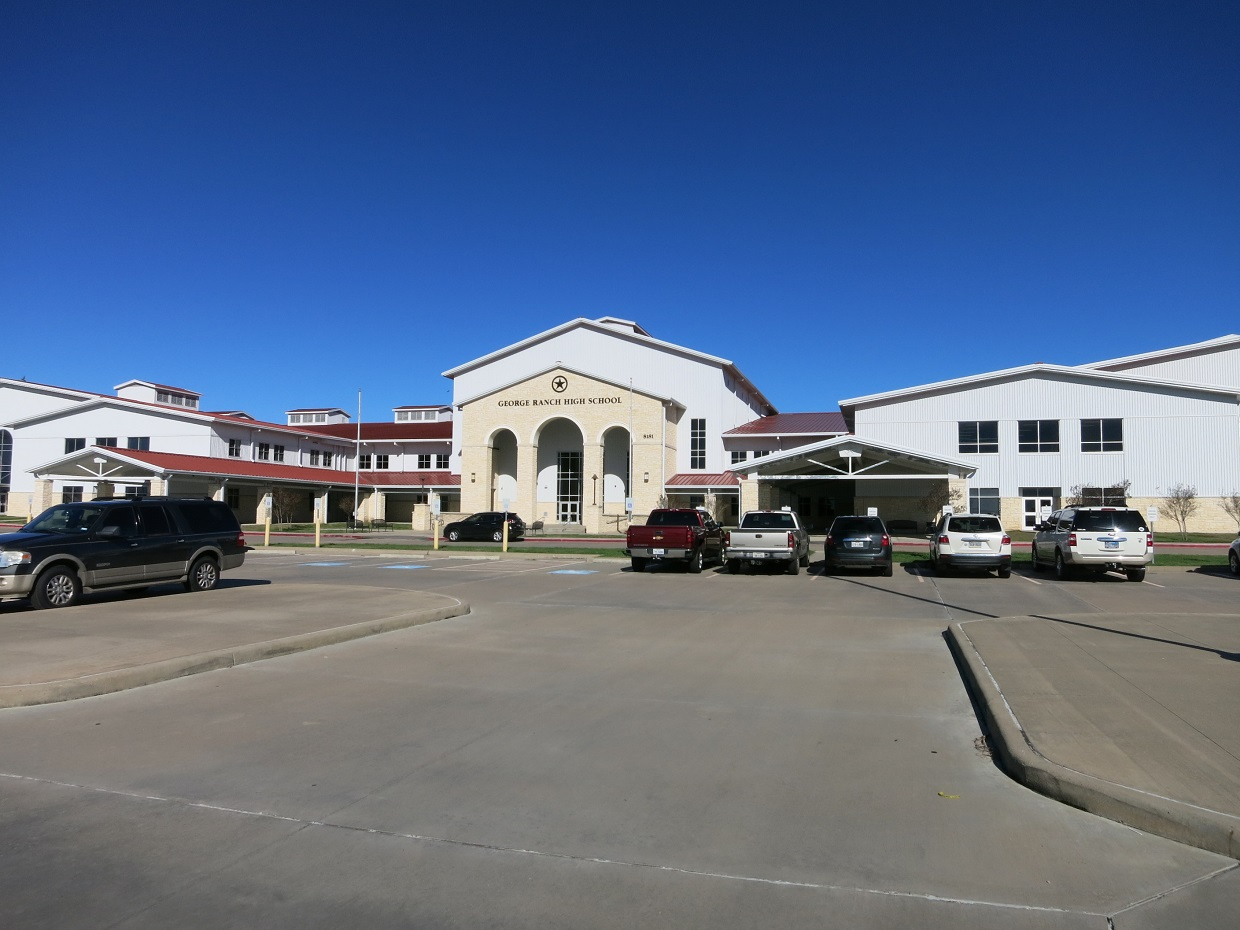
George Ranch High School

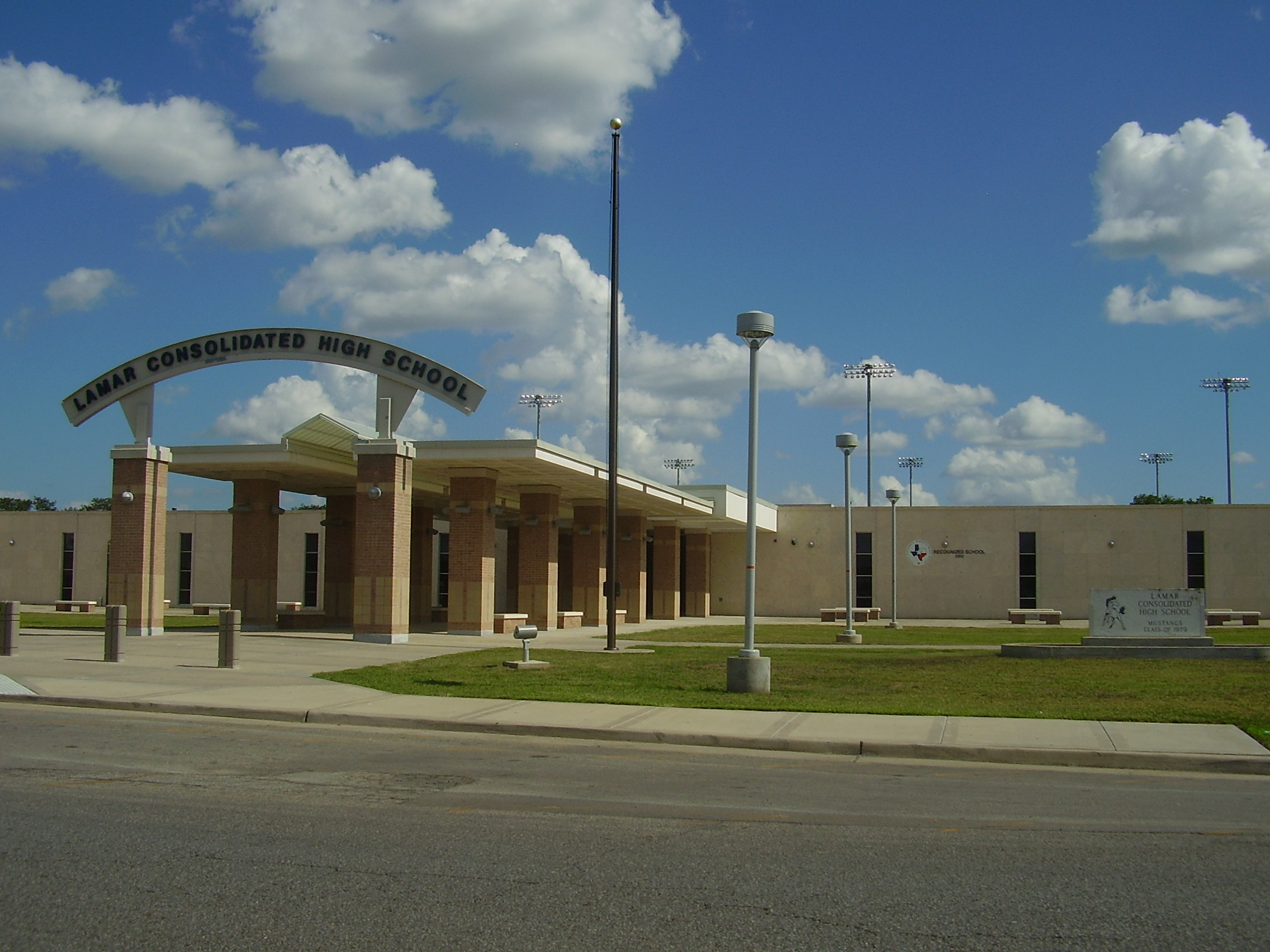
Lamar Consolidated High School

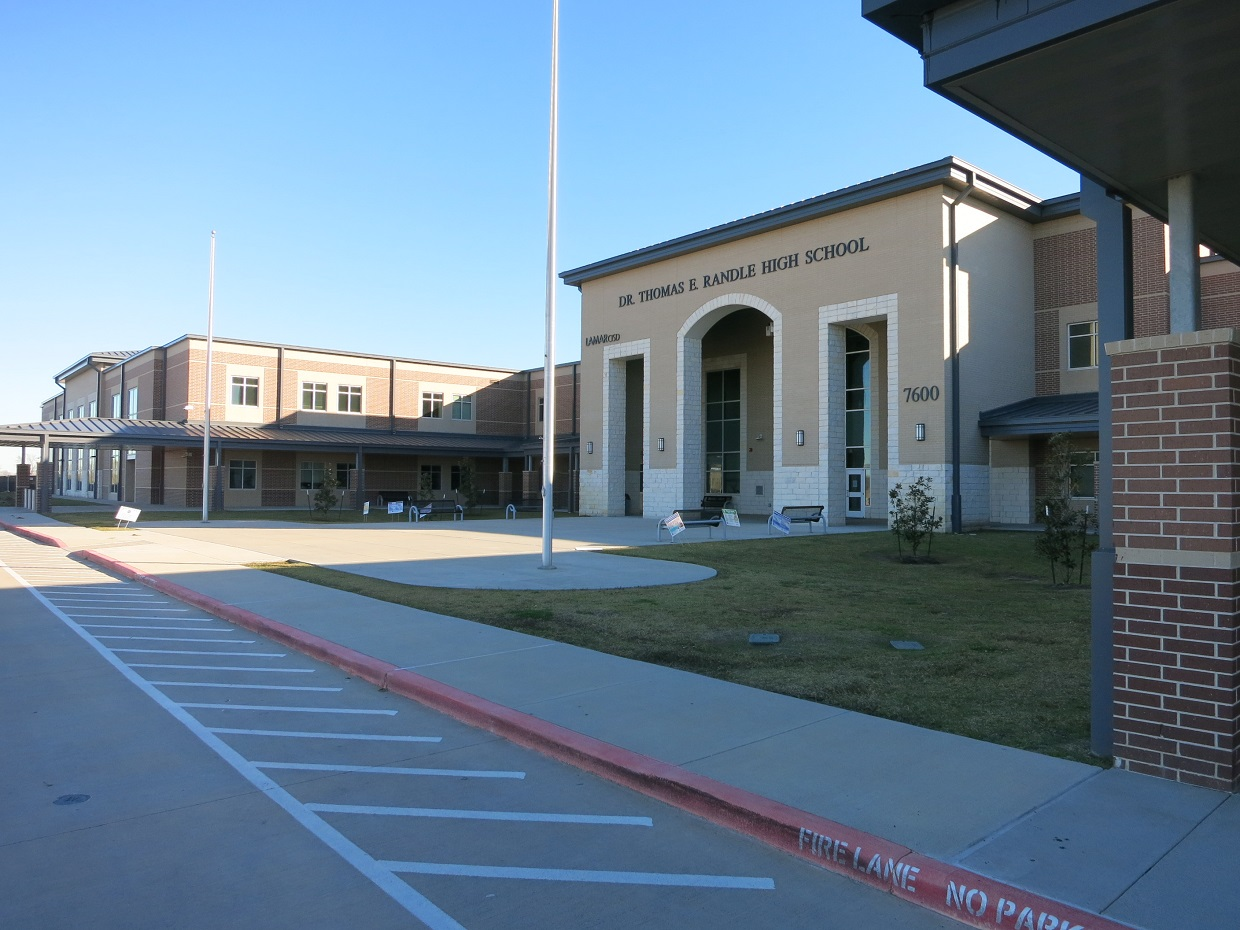
Randle High School

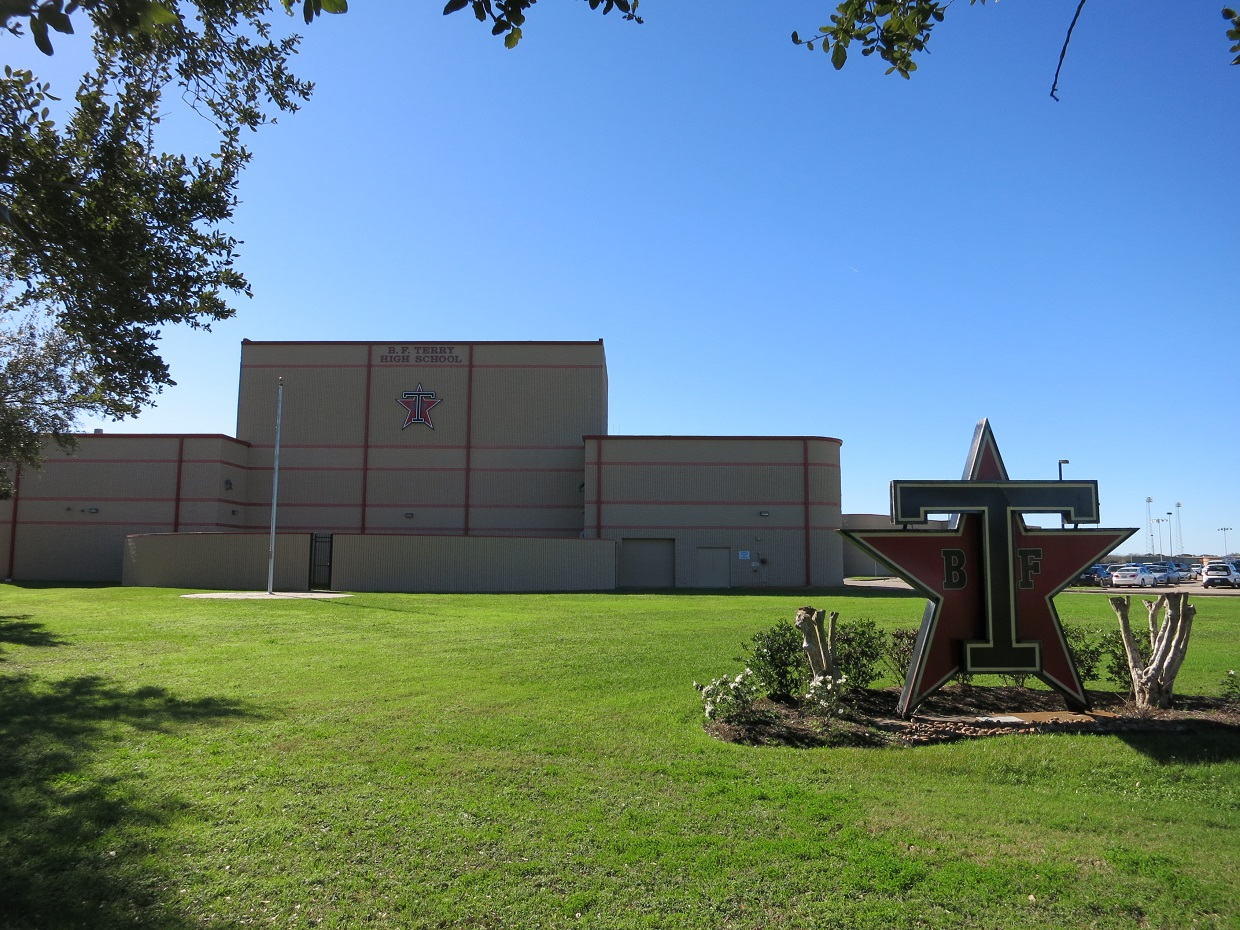
B. F. Terry High School

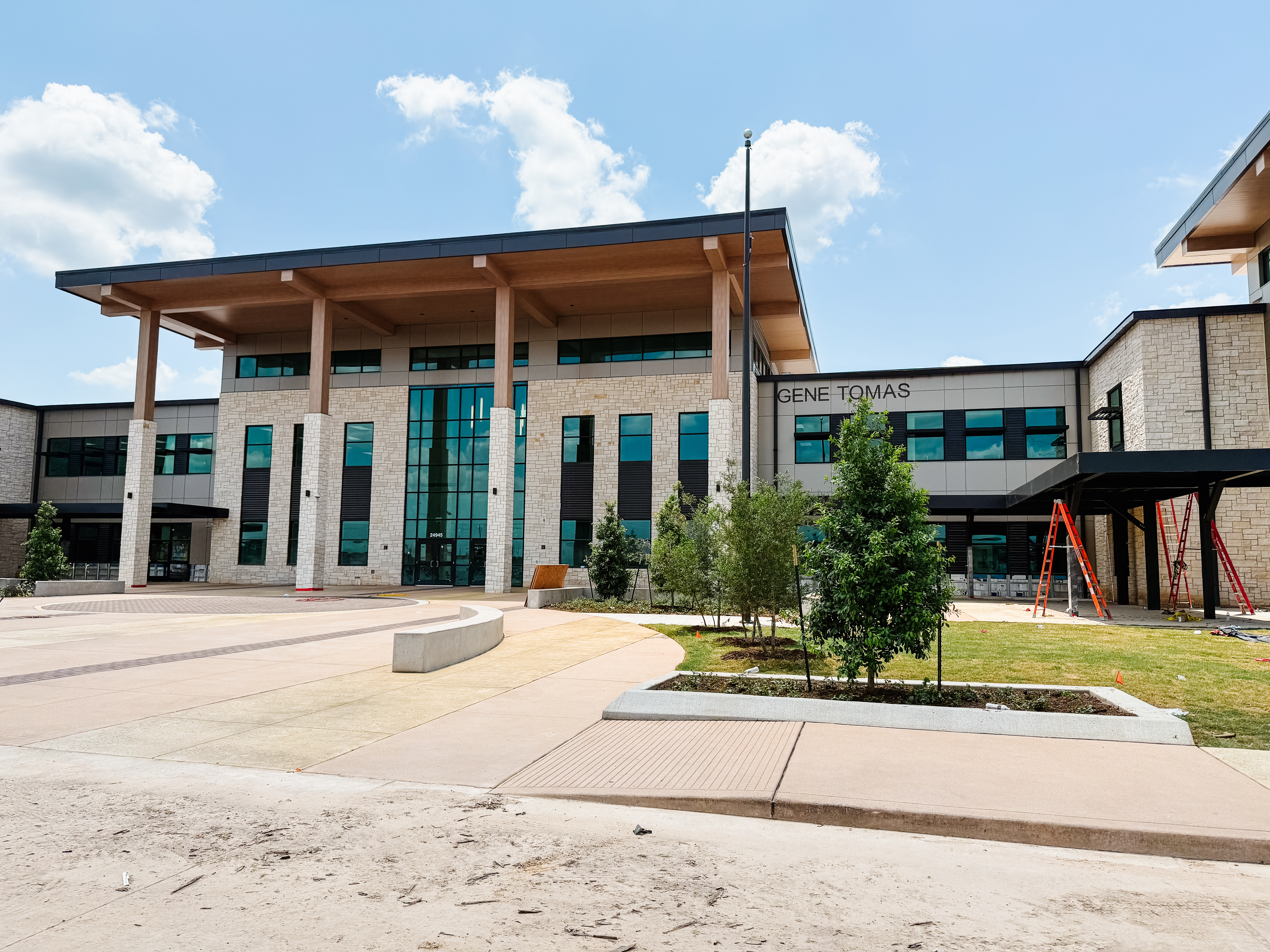
Gene Tomas High School

Junior high schools (grades 7-8)
Name	Established	Location	Mascot	Track	Additional information
Ella Banks Junior High School	2025	Richmond ETJ	Gators	Green	
Andrew Briscoe Junior High School	2001	Richmond ETJ	Falcons	Gold	
George Junior High School	1973	Rosenburg	Rangers	Red	
Mirabeau B. Lamar Junior High School	1957	Rosenburg	Mustangs	Blue	
Dean Leaman Junior High School	2016	Fulshear	Chargers	Purple	
Antoinette Davis Reading Junior High School	2010	Richmond ETJ	Longhorns	Maroon	
Harry Wright Junior High School	2021	Richmond ETJ	Lions	Silver	

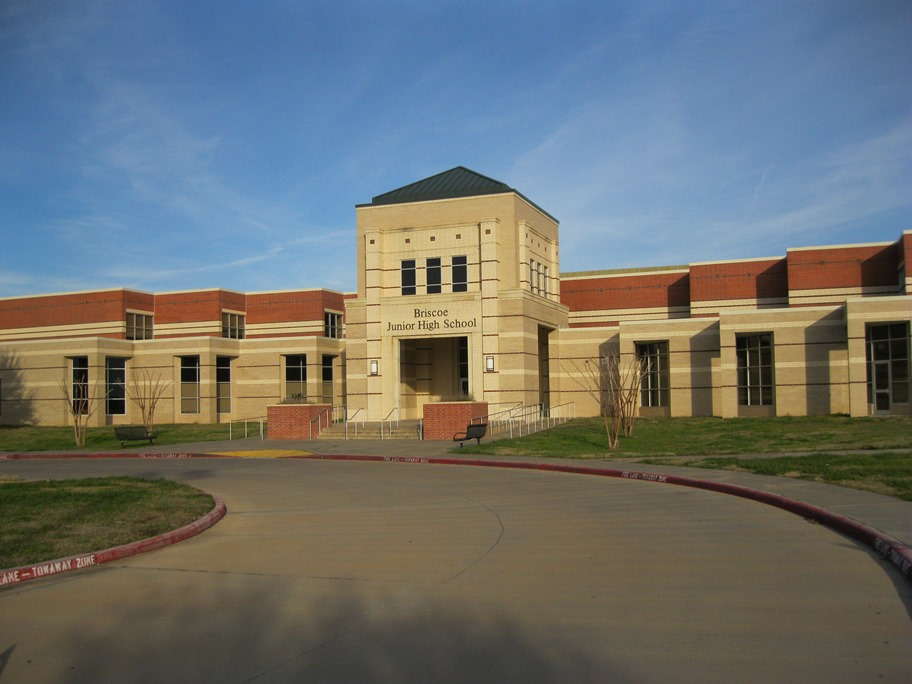
Briscoe Junior High School

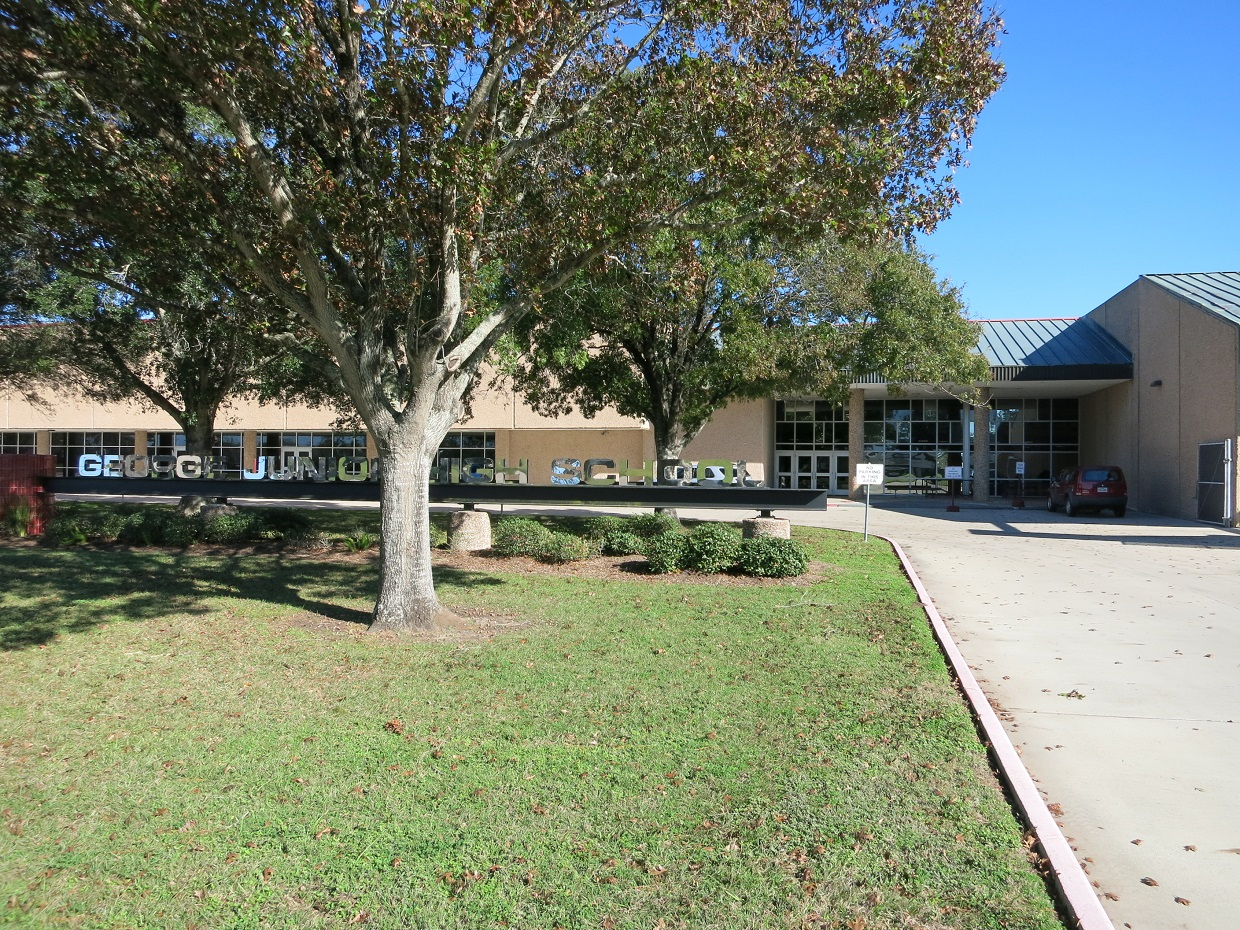
George Junior High School

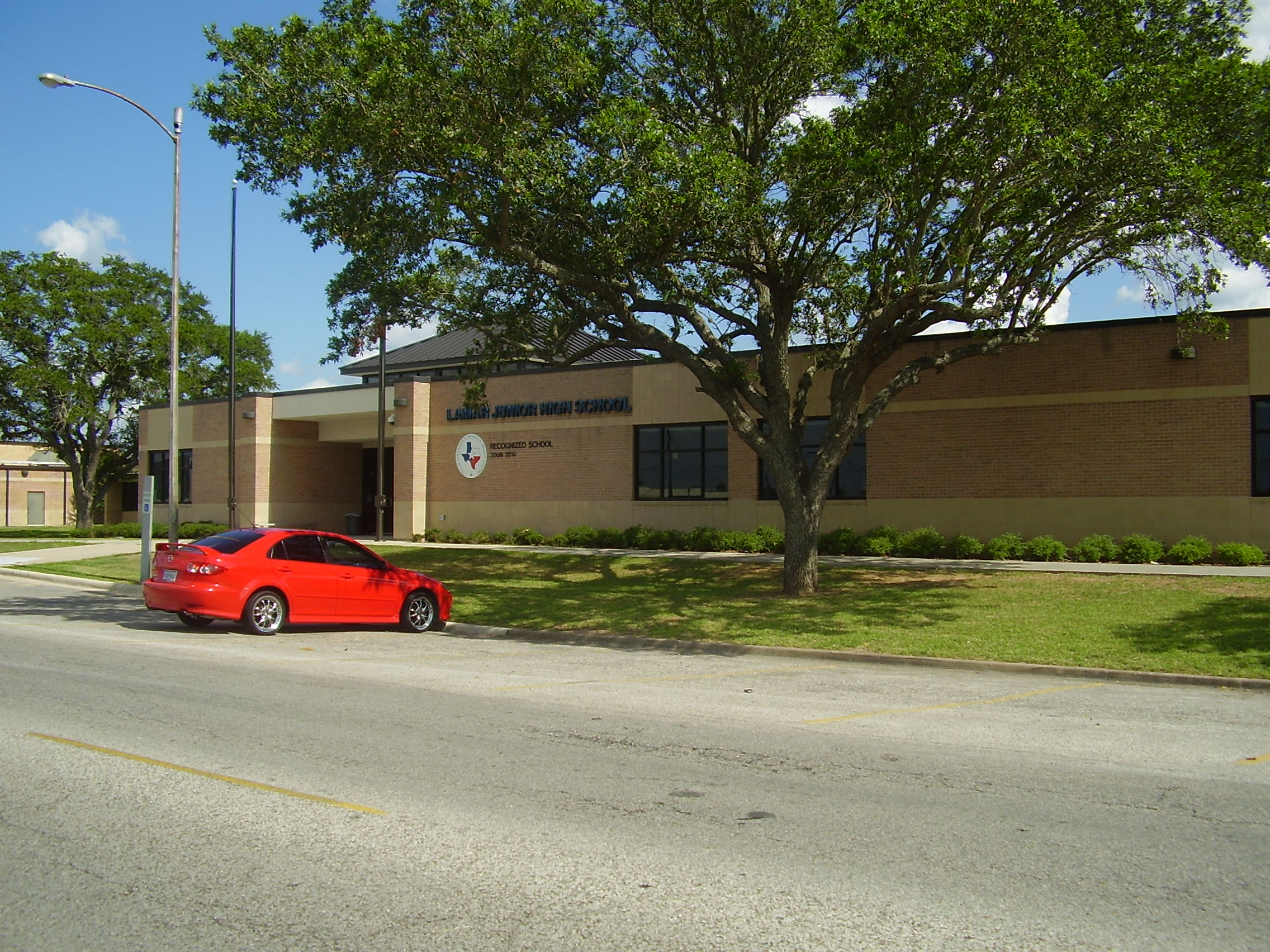
Lamar Junior High School

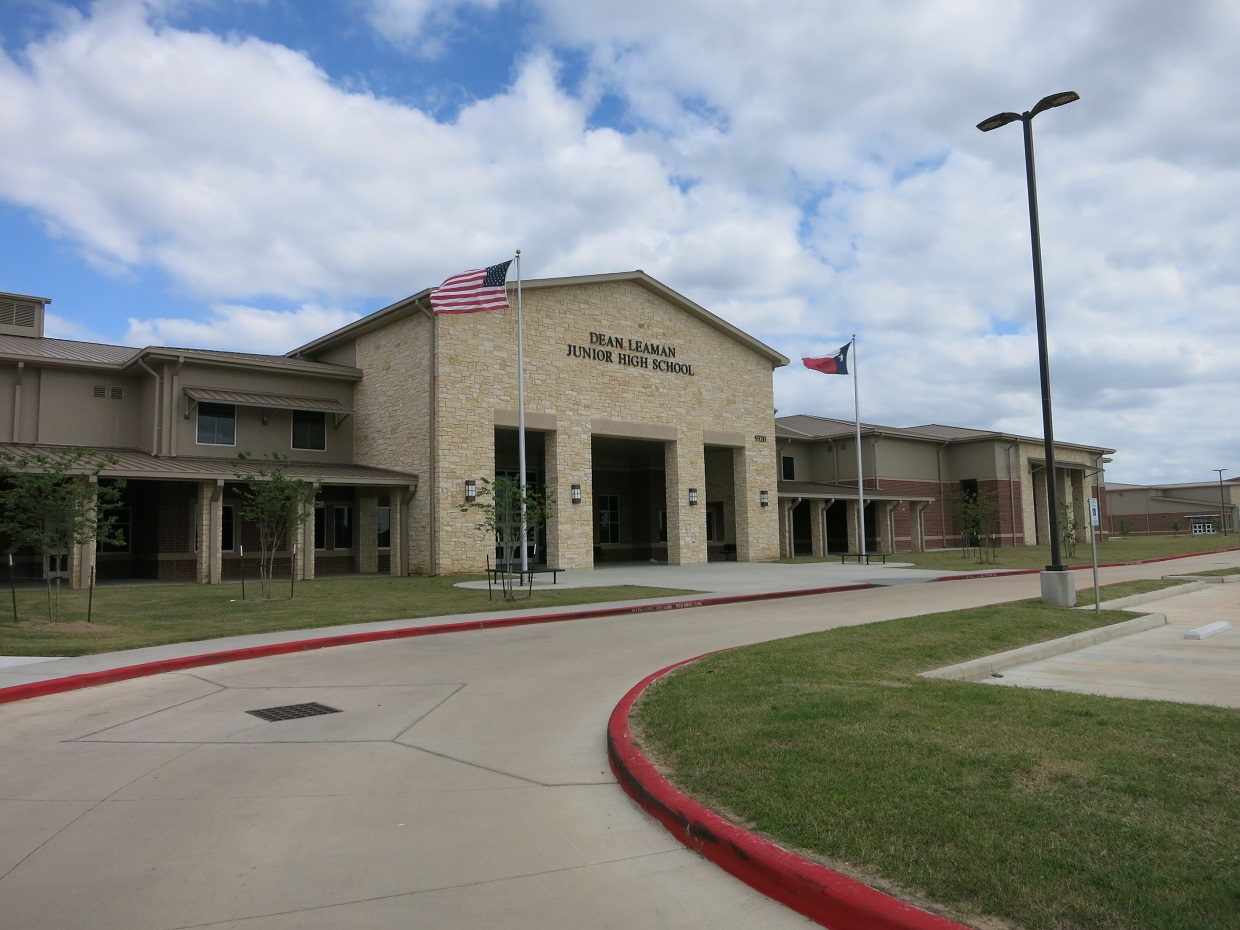
Dean Leaman Junior High School

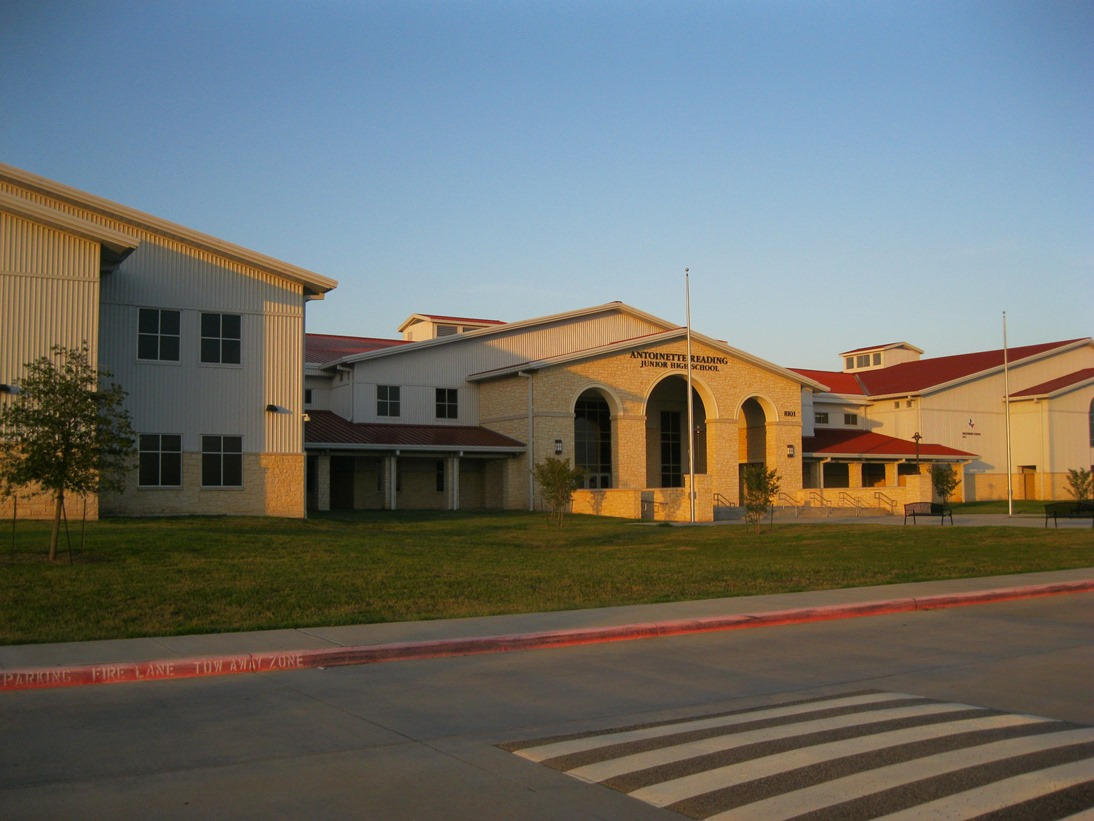
Antoinette Reading Junior High School

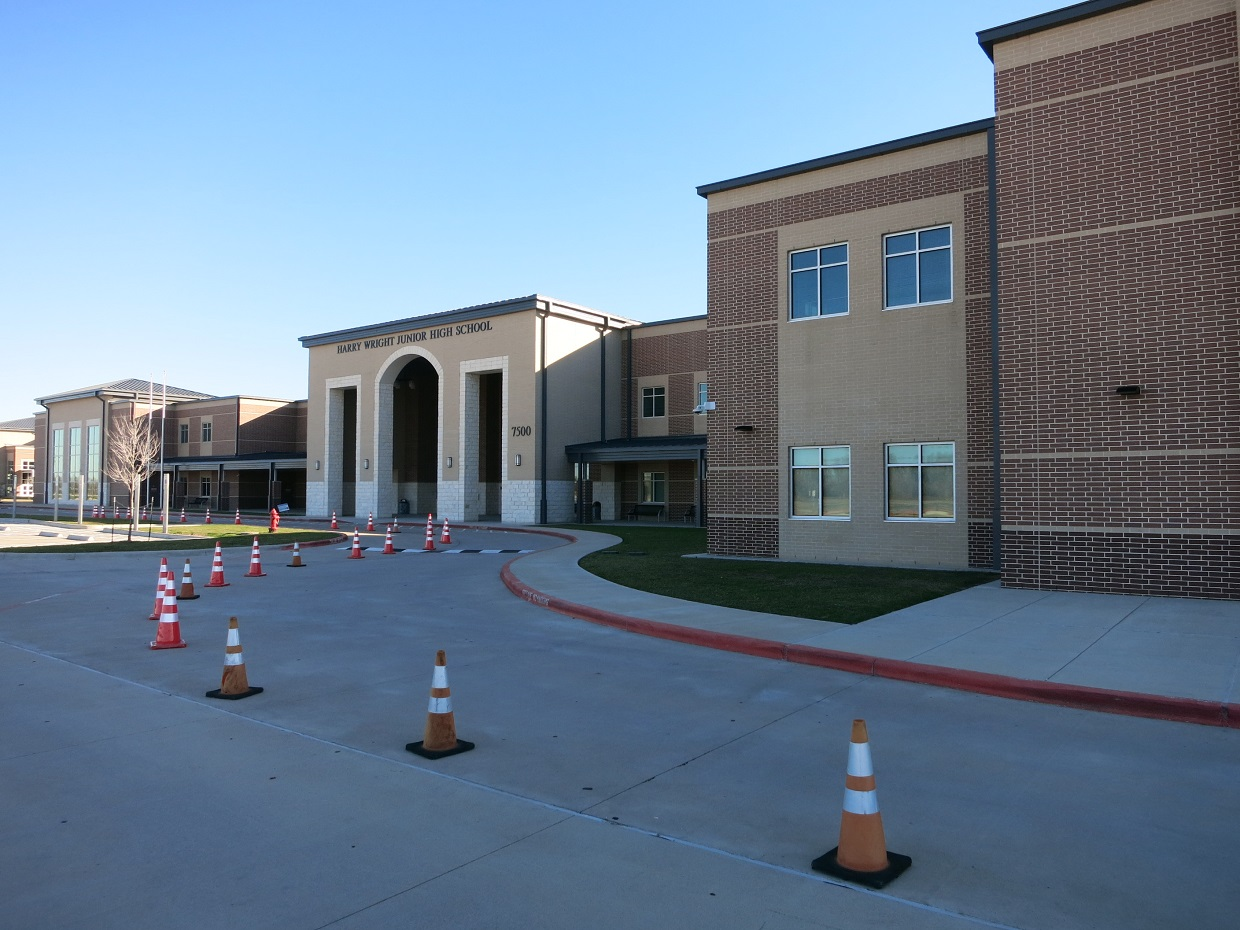
Harry Wright Junior High School

Middle schools (grade 6)
Name	Established	Location	Mascot	Track	Additional information
Sandy Bielstein Middle School	2025	Richmond ETJ	Gators	Green	
Jose Antonio Navarro Middle School	1987	Rosenburg	Rangers	Red	
James W. Roberts Middle School	2019	Fulshear	Chargers	Purple	
Mary "Polly" Moore Jones Ryon Middle School	2014	Richmond ETJ	Longhorns	Maroon	
James Steenbergen Middle School	2024	Richmond ETJ	Lions	Silver	
Henry Wertheimer Middle School	2008	Richmond ETJ	Falcons	Gold	
Jane Johnson Wessendorff Middle School	1997	Rosenburg	Mustangs	Blue	

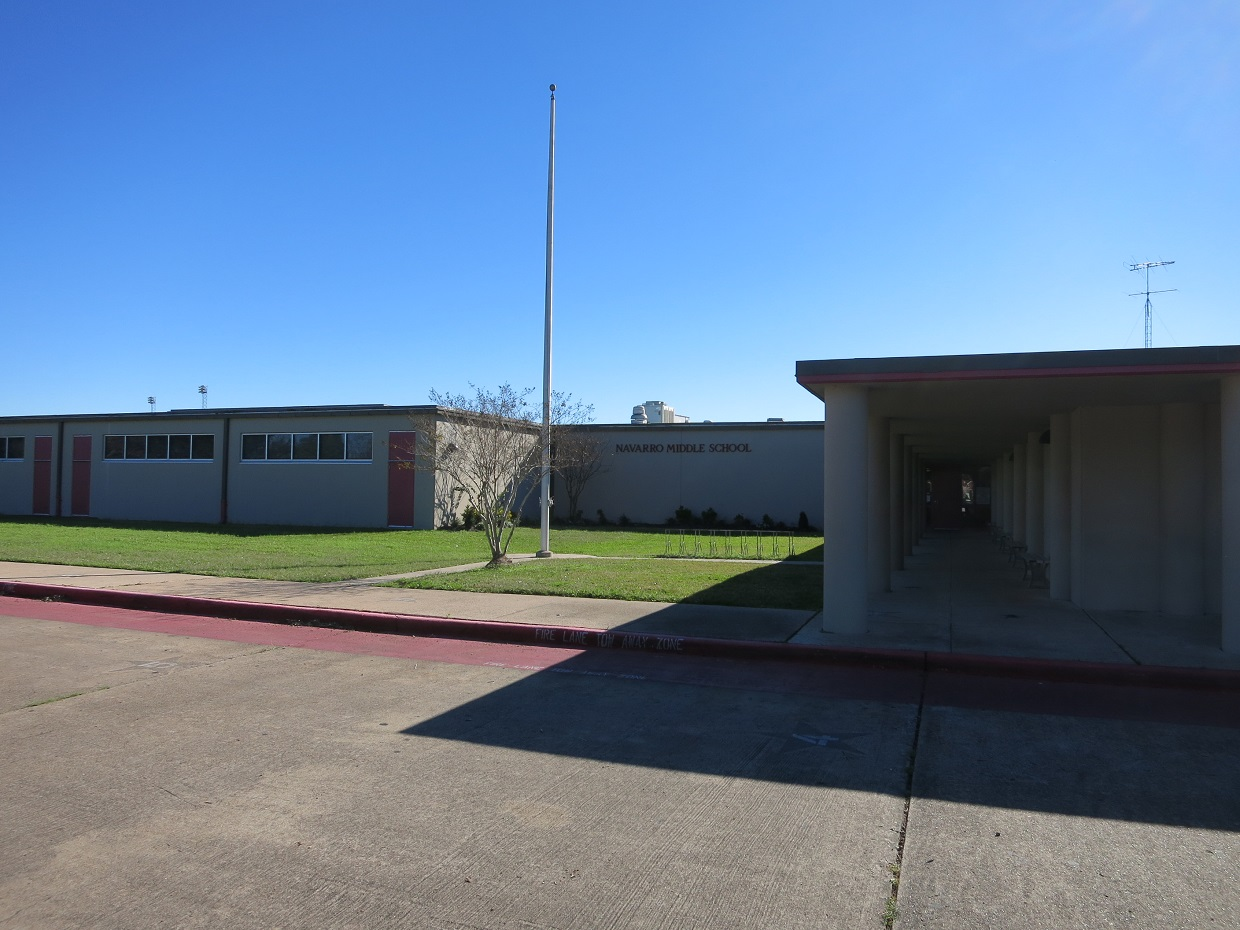
Navarro Middle School

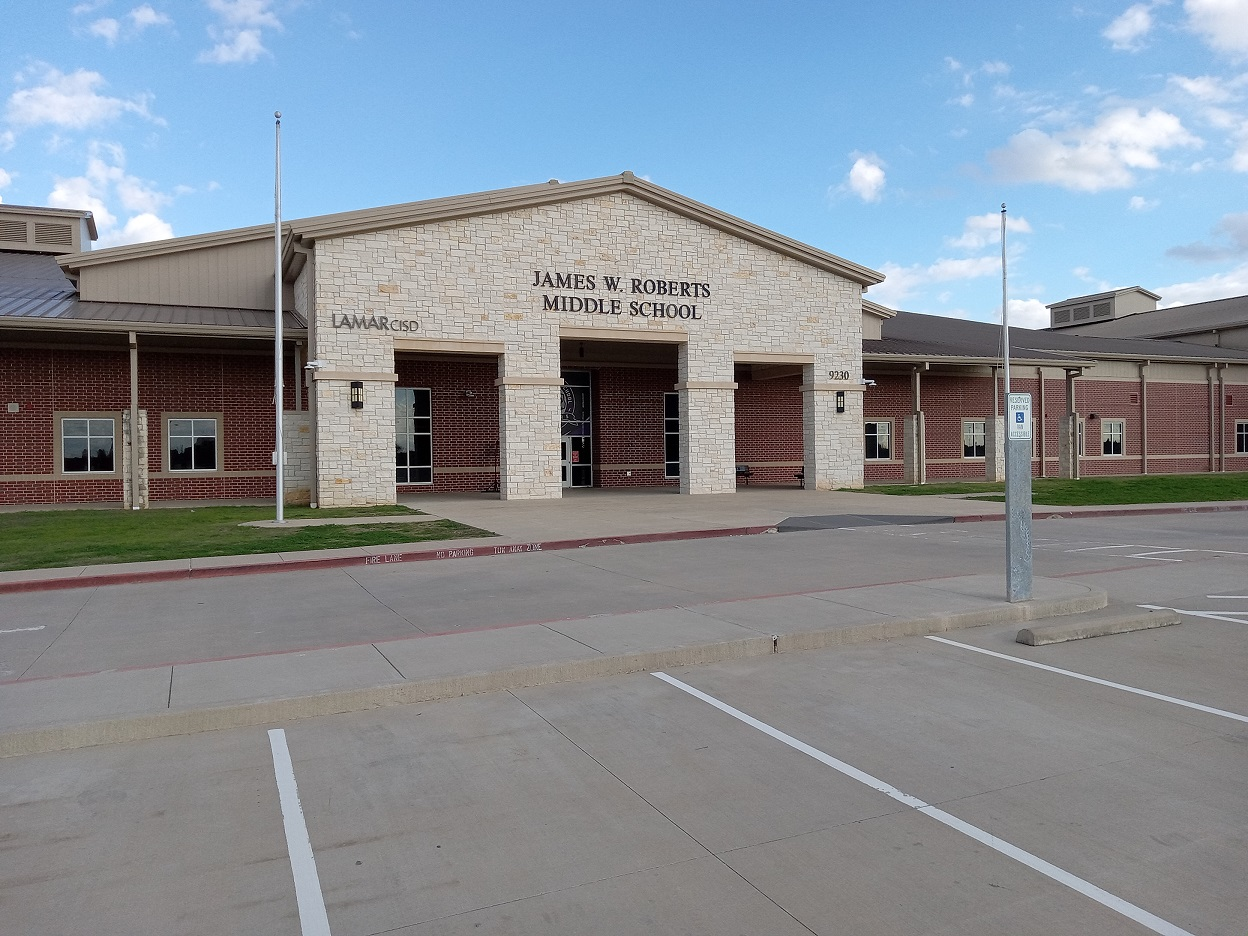
James W. Roberts Middle School

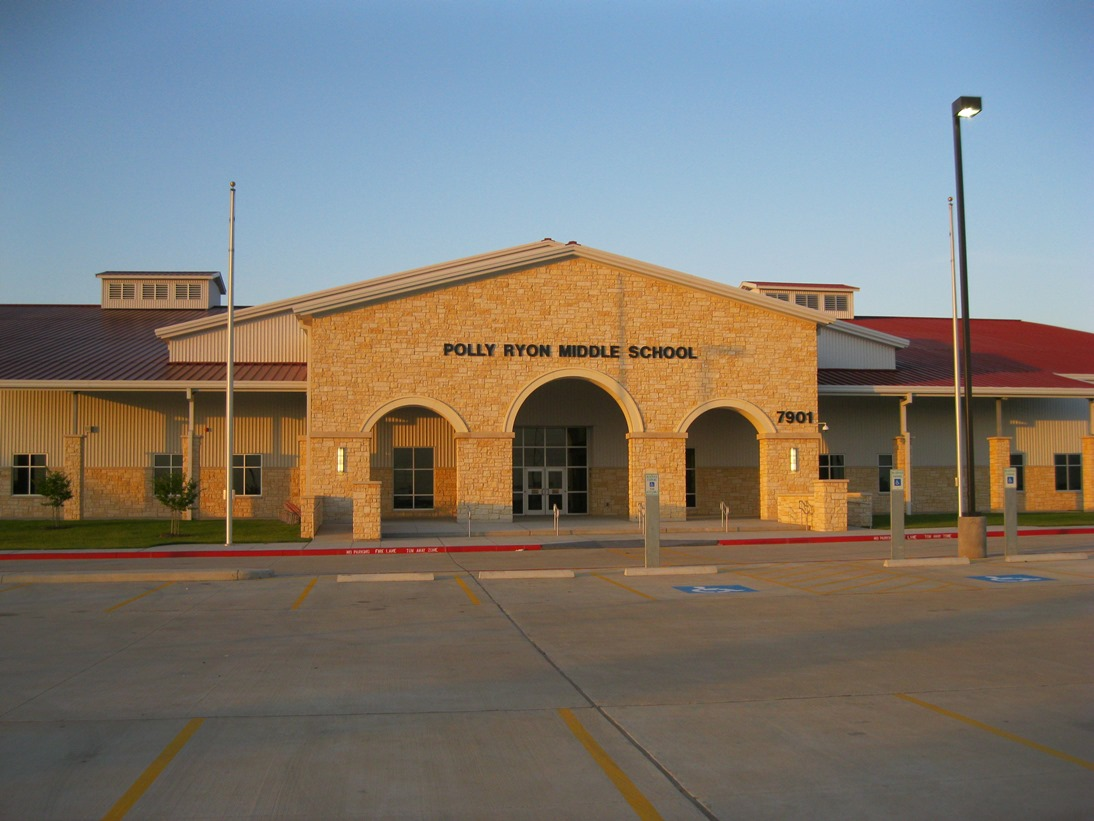
Polly Ryon Middle School

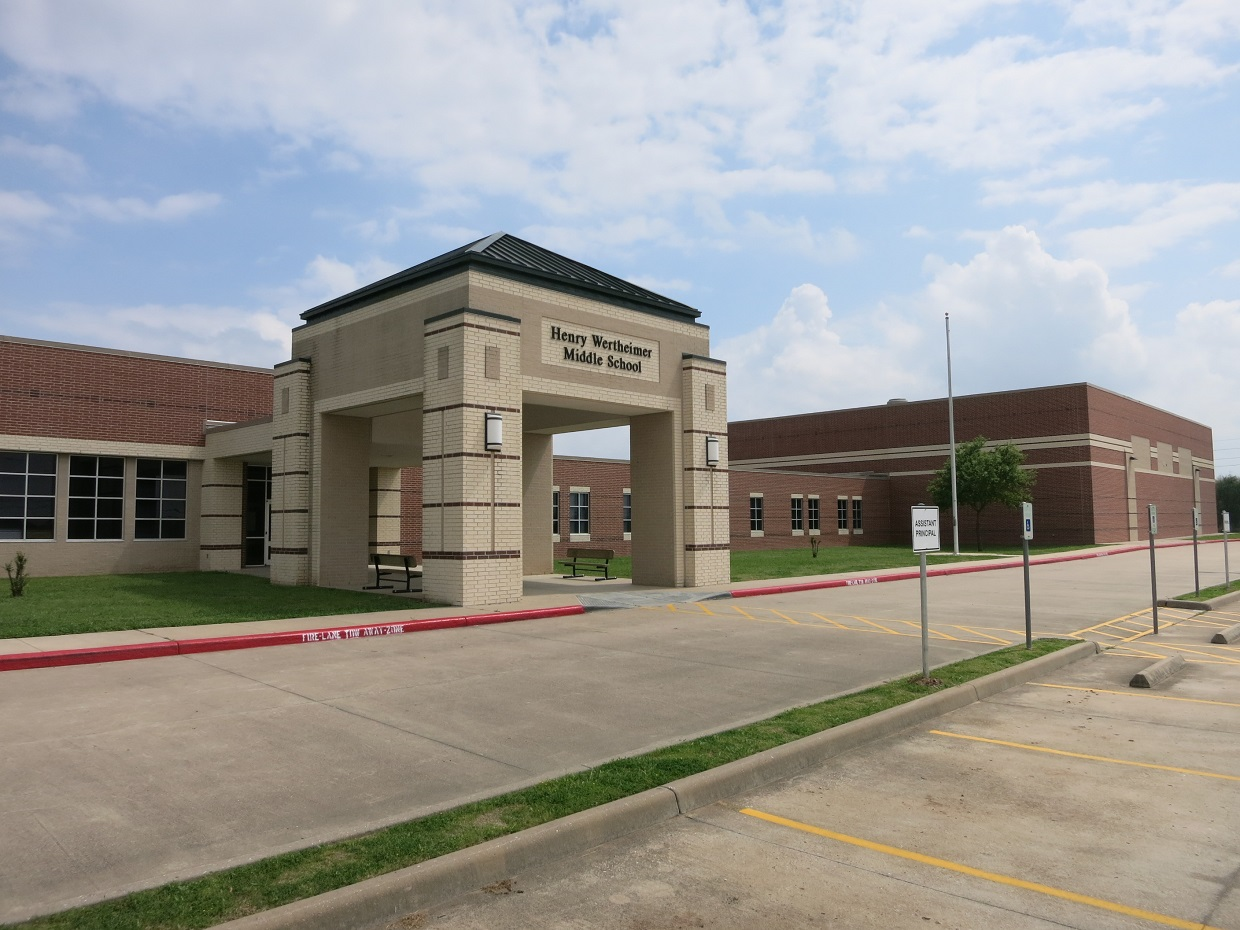
Henry Wertheimer Middle School

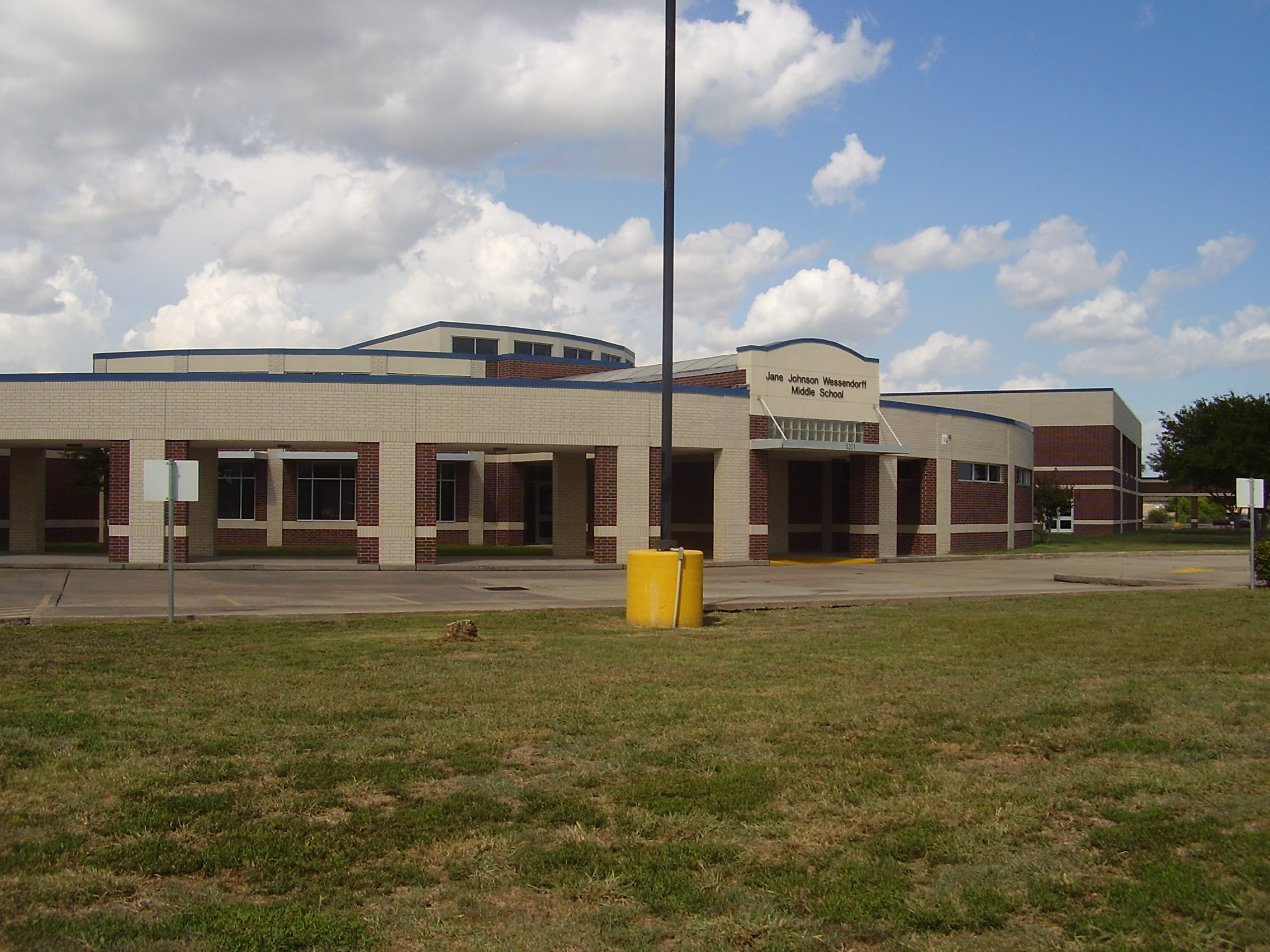
Wessendorff Middle School

=== Elementary schools ===
- Judge James C. Adolphus Elementary (unincorporated area)
- John M. Arredondo Elementary (unincorporated area)
- Stephen F. Austin Elementary School (unincorporated area, Pecan Grove)
  - 2006 National Blue Ribbon School
- Becerra Elementary School
- Carl Briscoe Bentley Elementary School (Fulshear)
- James Bowie Elementary School (Rosenberg)
- Bess Campbell Elementary School (Sugar Land, Greatwood)
- Don Carter Elementary School (Richmond)
- Judge Thomas R. Culver III Elementary School (Rosenberg)
- Susanna Dickinson Elementary School (Sugar Land, Greatwood)
- Alice Deanne Sbrusch Fagert Elementary School (unincorporated area, Richmond postal address)
- Samuel Miles Frost Elementary School (unincorporated area, Pecan Grove)
- Adriane Mathews Gray Elementary School (Richmond)
- Haygood Elementary ( Fulshear)
- Joe A. Hubenak Elementary (unincorporated area)
  - Hubenak opened in 2009 and has a capacity of 740. The cost was $19.8 million. By 2015 Hubenak had more than 1,200 students, prompting the district to open another elementary school.
- John Huggins Elementary School (Fulshear)
- Irma Dru Hutchison Elementary School (Richmond)
- A.W. Jackson Elementary School (Rosenberg)
  - 2018 National Blue Ribbon School
- Kathleen Joerger Lindsey Elementary School (Katy)
- Jane Long Elementary School (Richmond)
- Willie Melton Sr. Elementary School (Brookshire)
- Hillman F. McNeill Elementary School (Richmond)
- Fletcher Morgan Jr. Elementary School (Fulshear)
- Meyer Elementary School (Rosenberg)
- Maxine Phelan Elementary School (Richmond)
- T.L. Pink Elementary School (Richmond)
- Viola Gilmore Randle Elementary School (Fulshear)
- Taylor Ray Elementary School (Rosenberg)
- Deaf Smith Elementary School (Richmond)
- Cora Thomas Elementary (unincorporated area)
  - Thomas opened in 2009 and has a capacity of 740. The cost was $18.4 million. Students previously going to Meyer and Williams elementaries were moved to Thomas.
- Tamarron Elementary School (Katy)
- William B. Travis Elementary School (Rosenberg)
- Manford Williams Elementary School (Richmond)
- William Velasquez Elementary School (unincorporated area)
  - 2012 National Blue Ribbon School

Early Childhood

- Juan Seguin Early Childhood Center (Richmond)
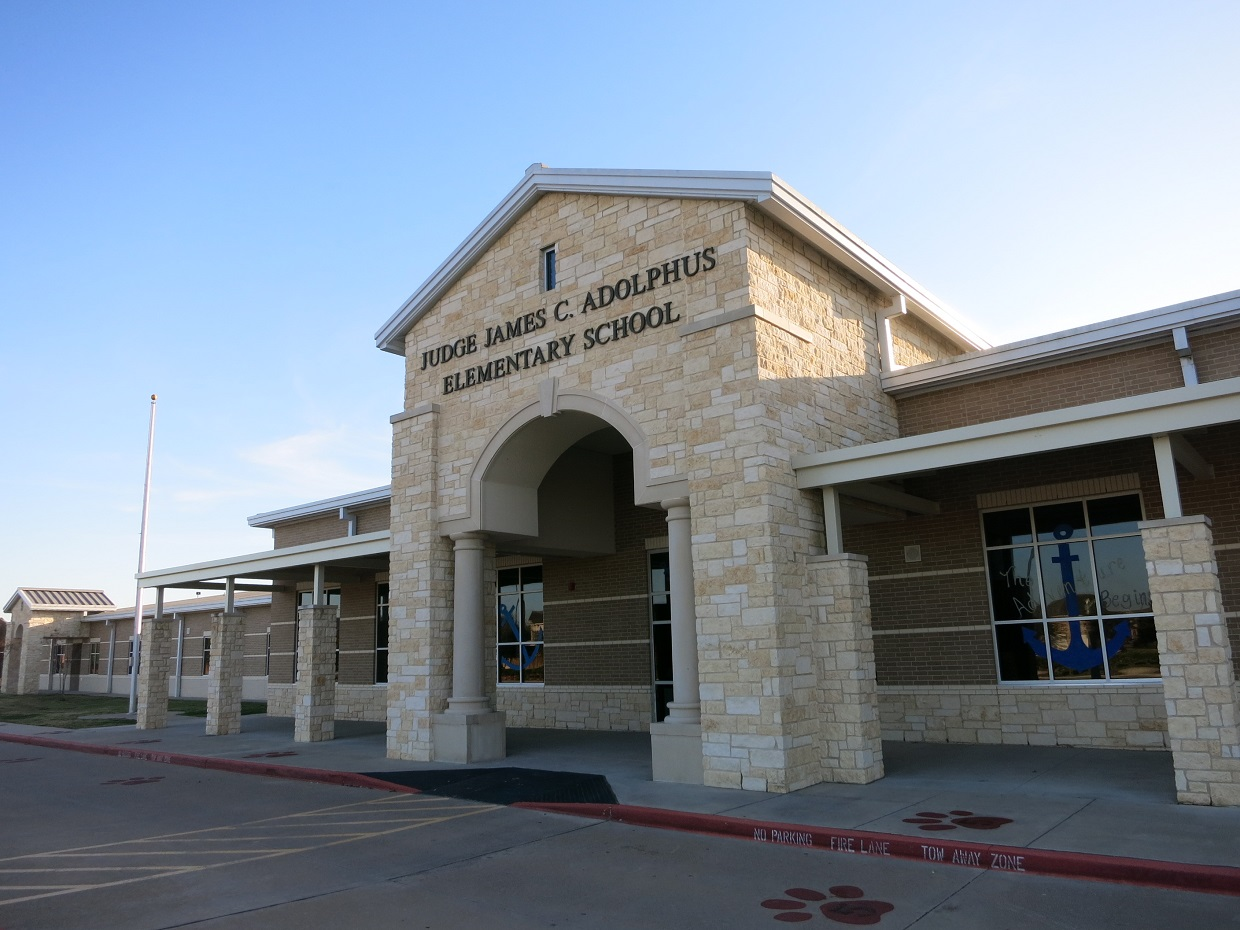
Judge James C. Adolphus Elementary School

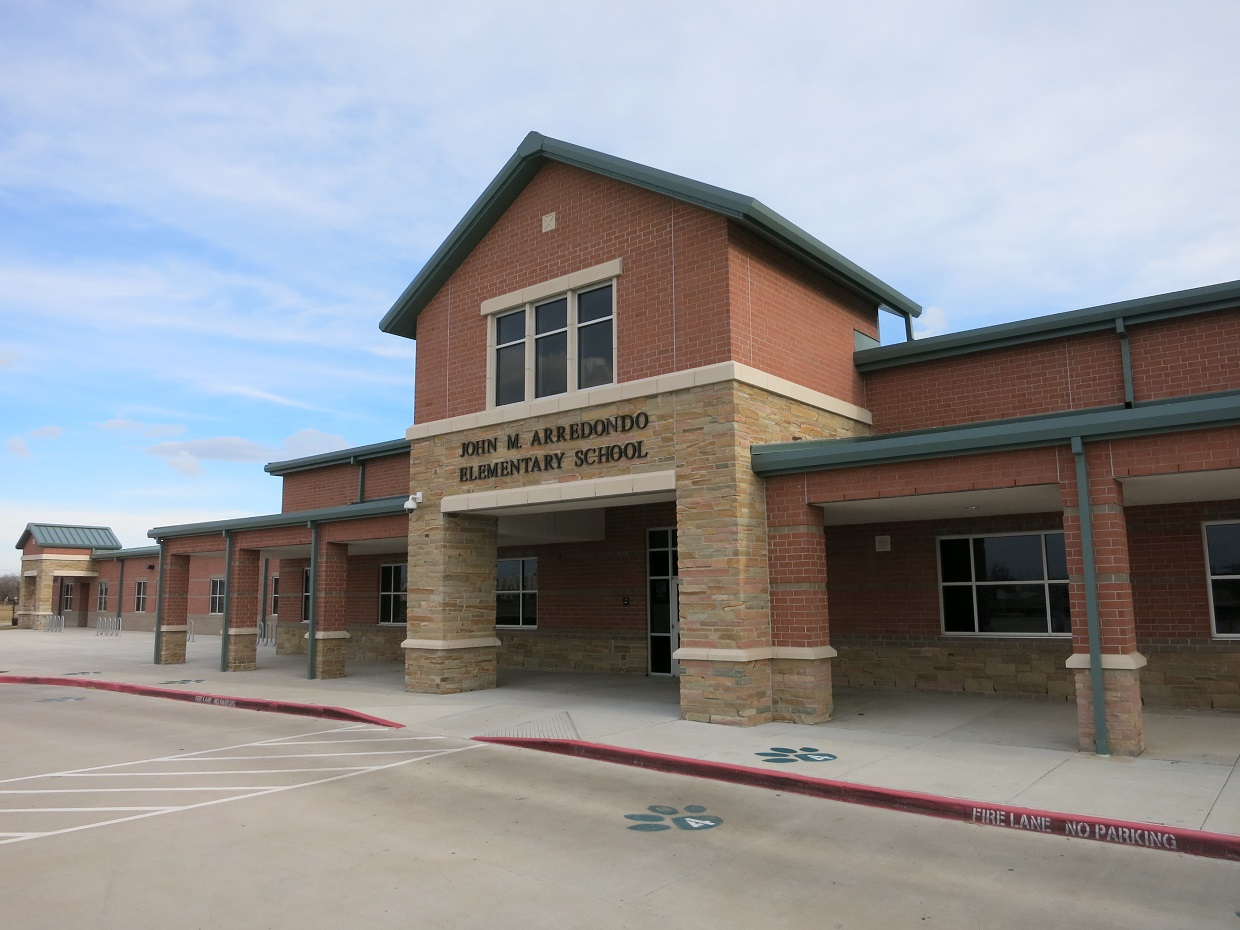
John M. Arredondo Elementary School

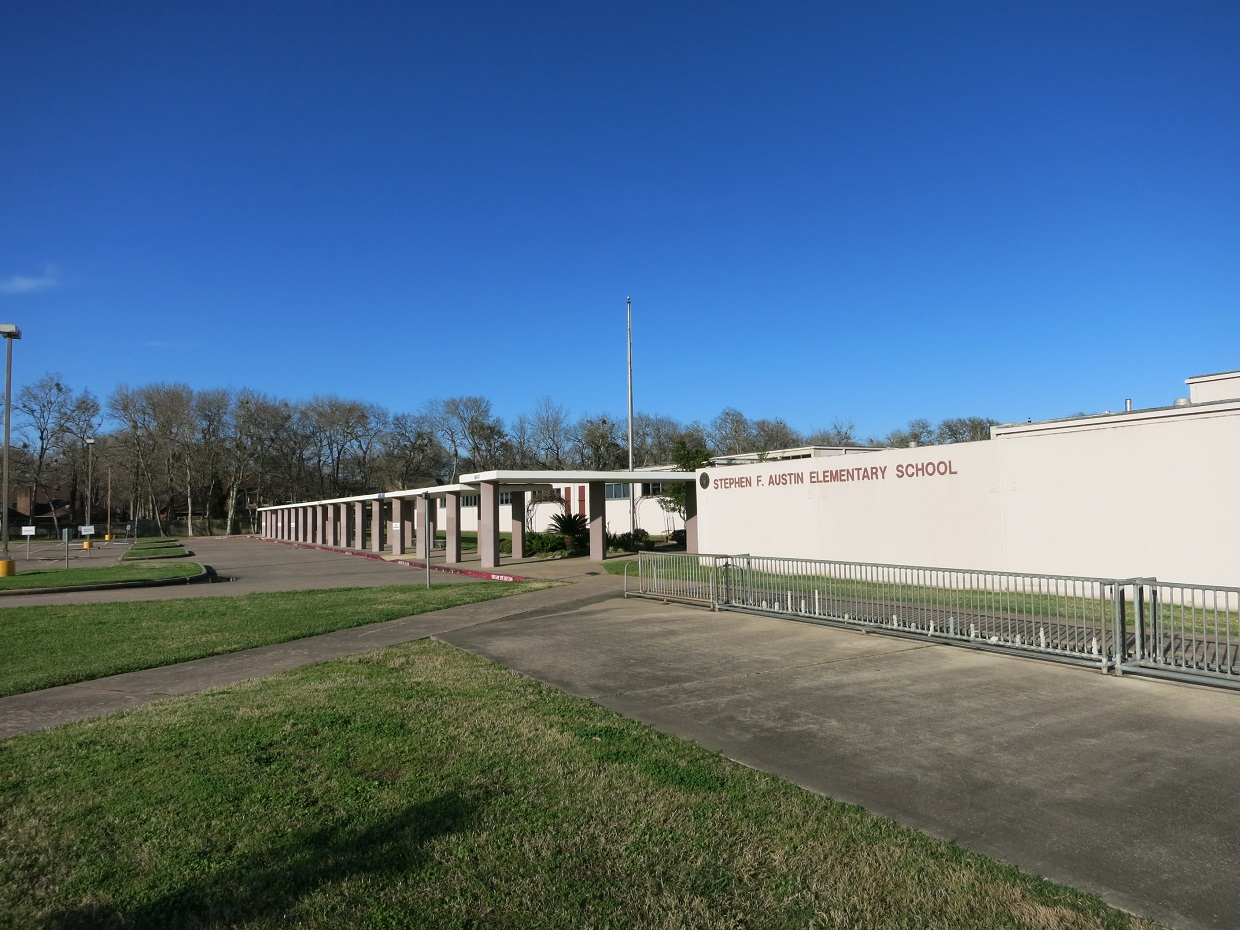
Stephen F. Austin Elementary School

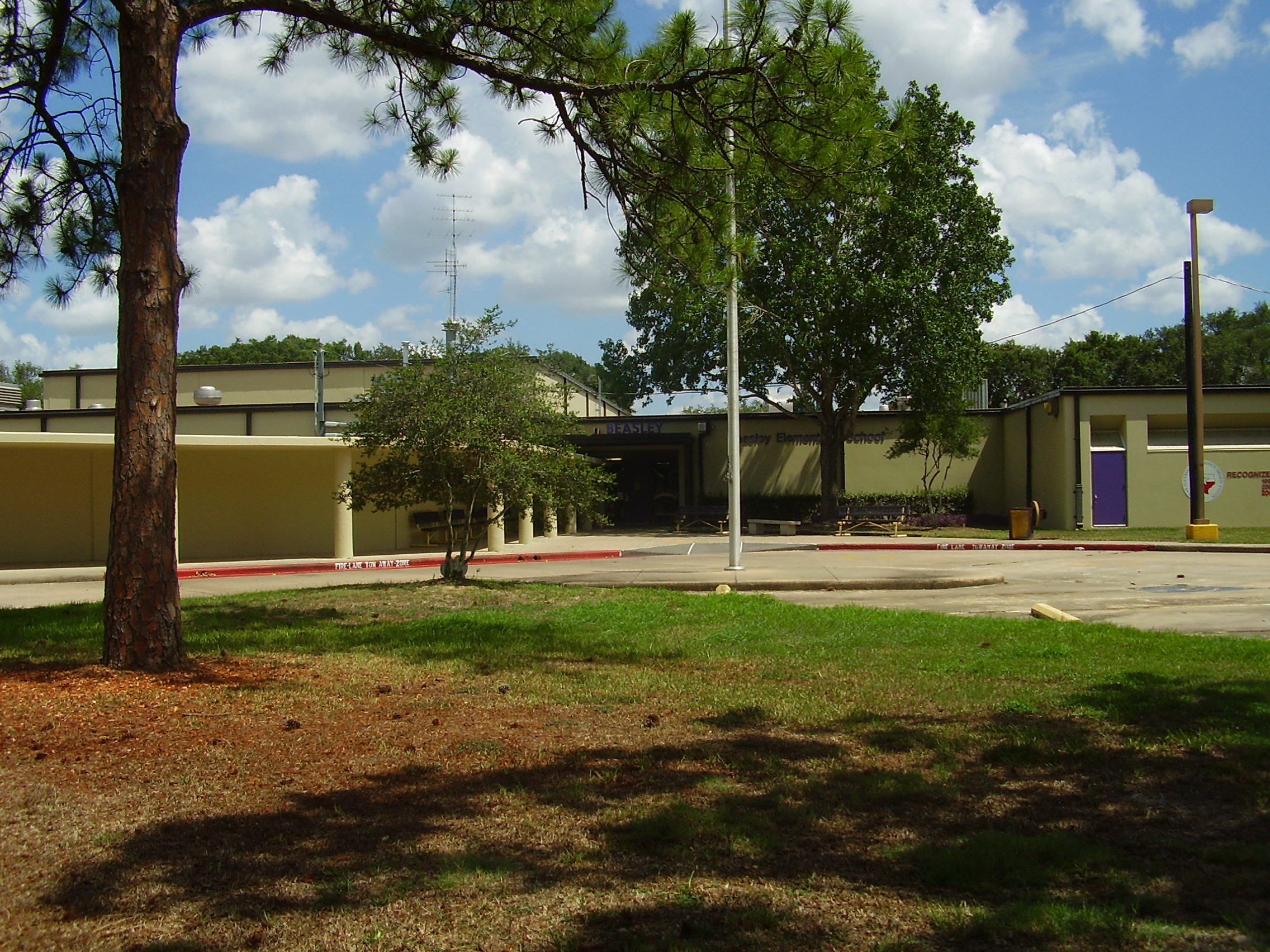
Beasley Elementary School

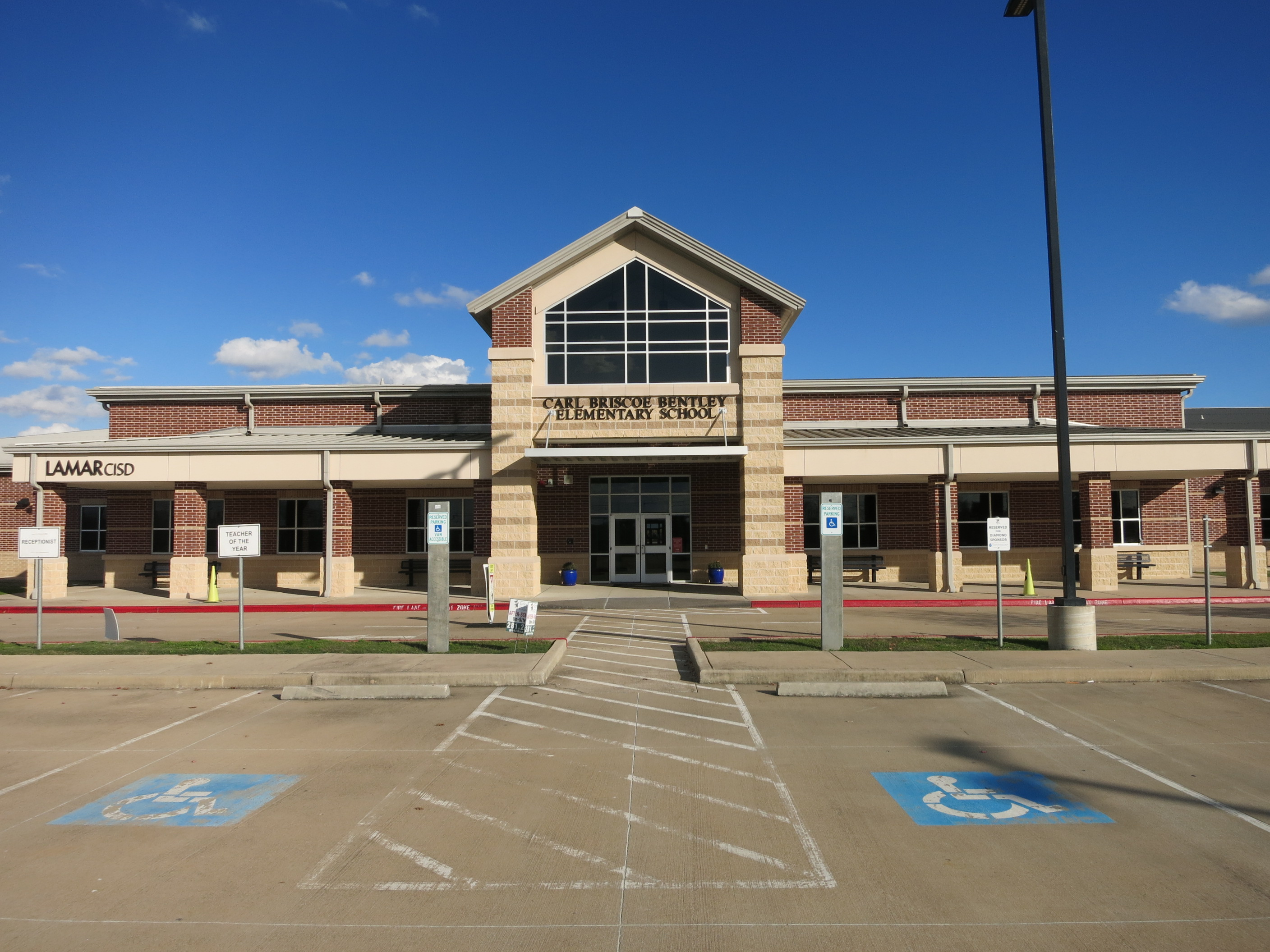
Carl Briscoe Bentley Elementary School

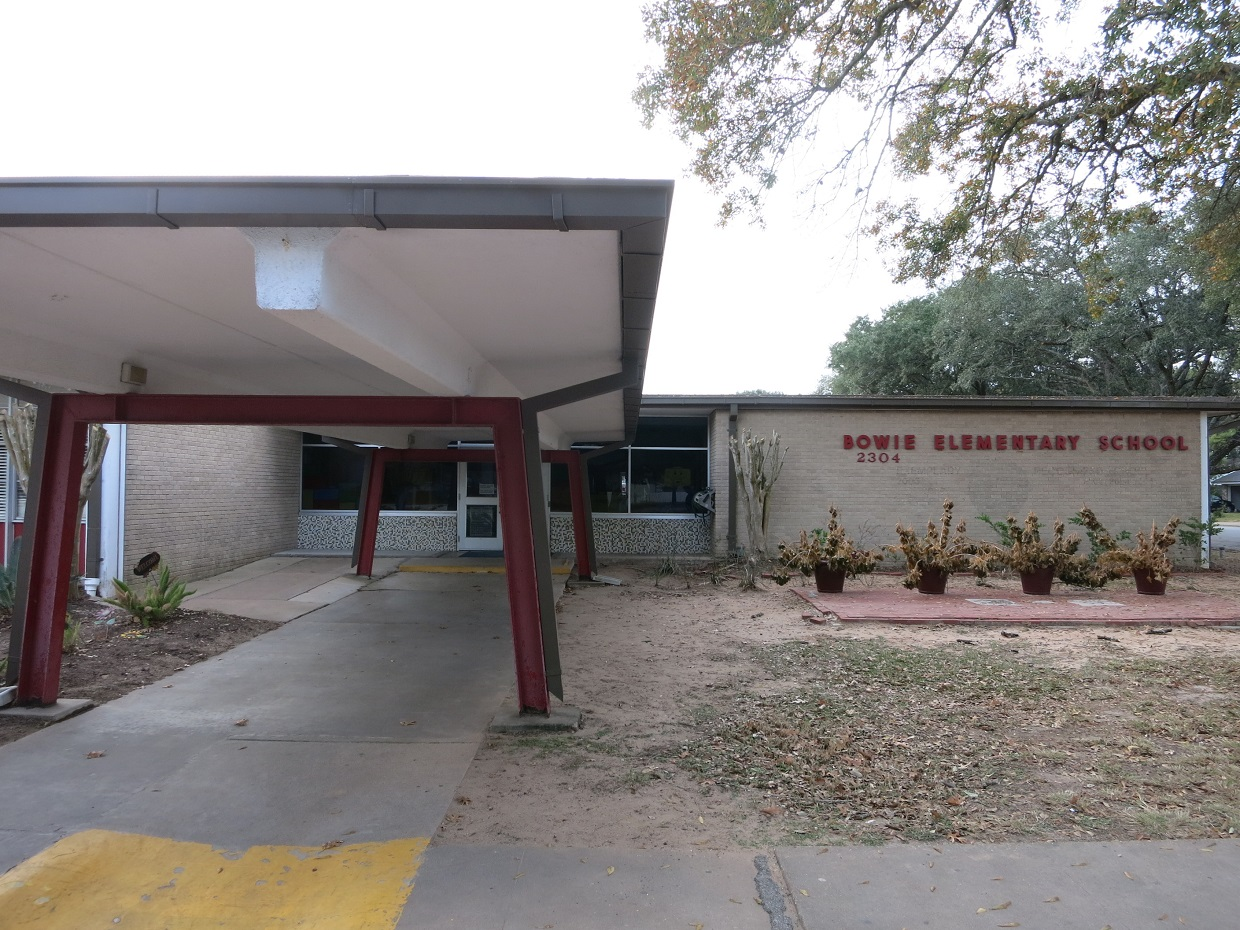
Bowie Elementary School

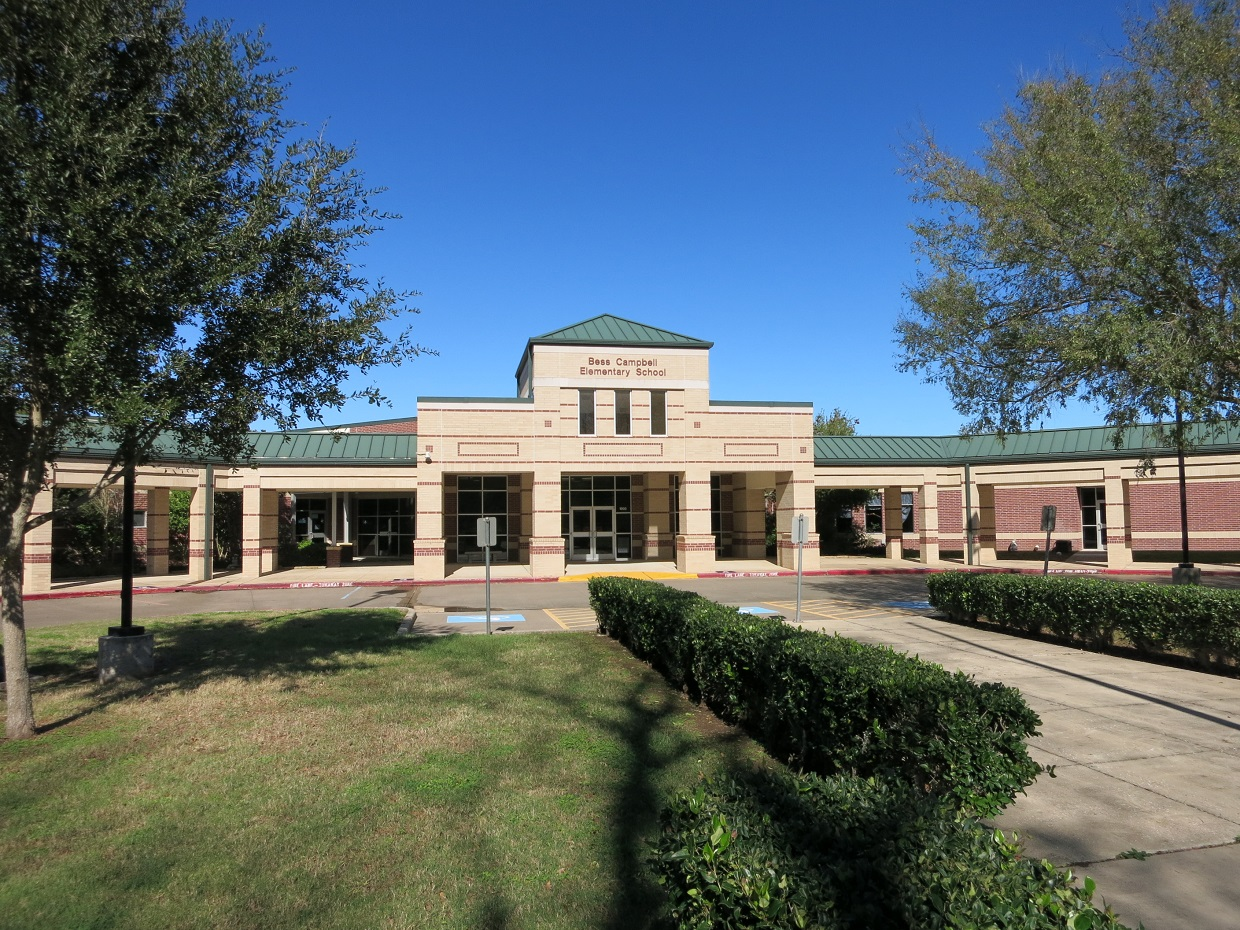
Bess Campbell Elementary School

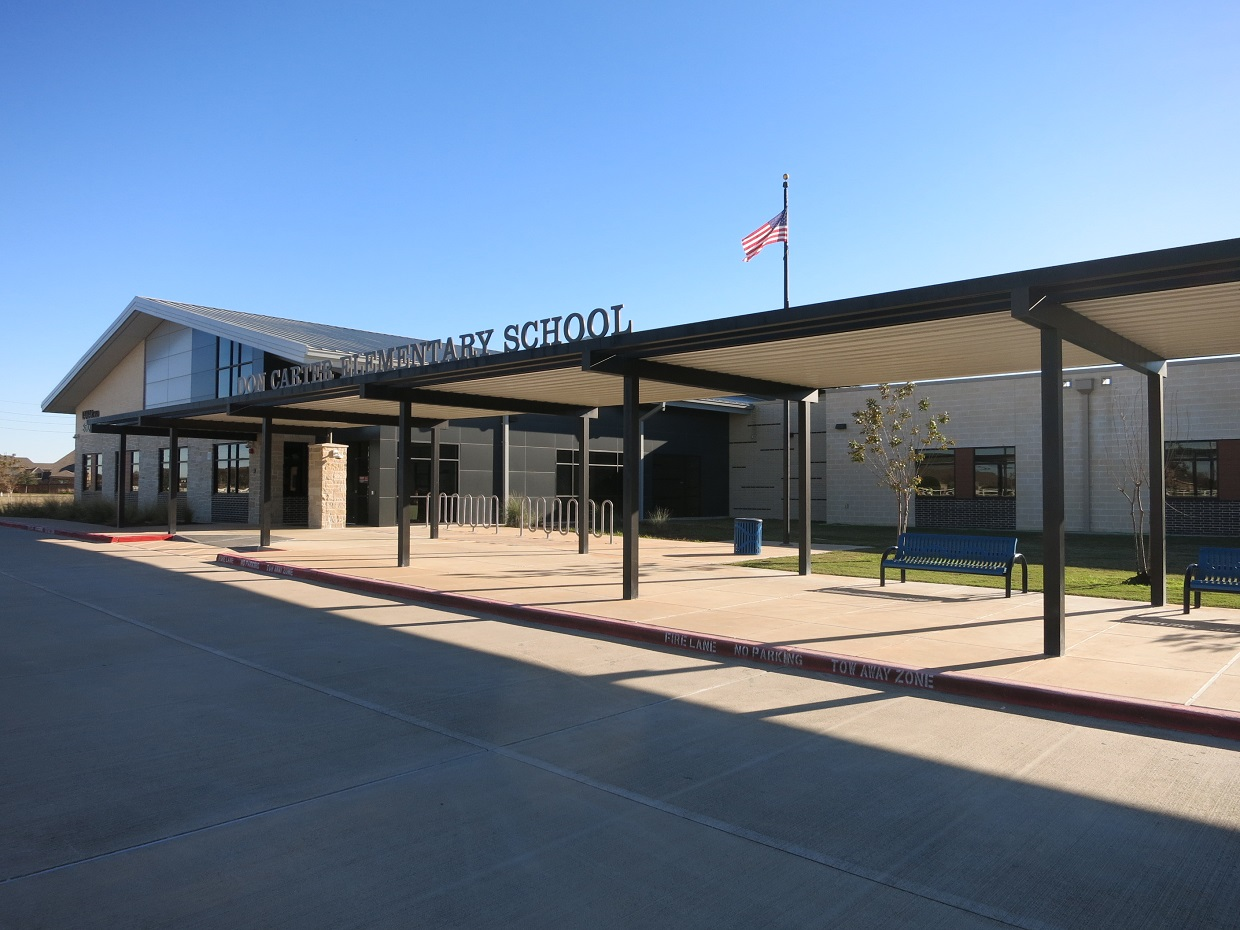
Don Carter Elementary School

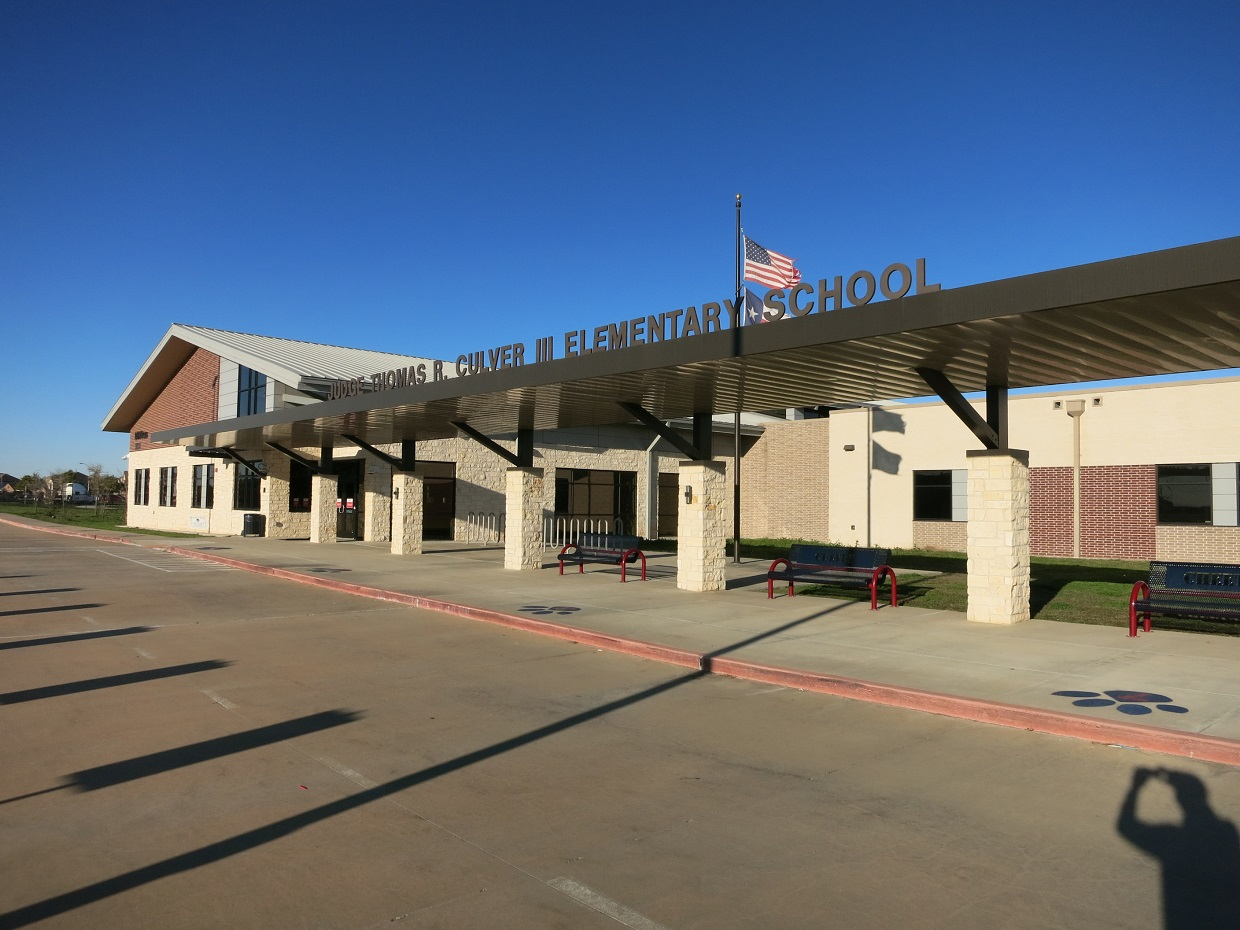
Judge Thomas R. Culver Elementary School

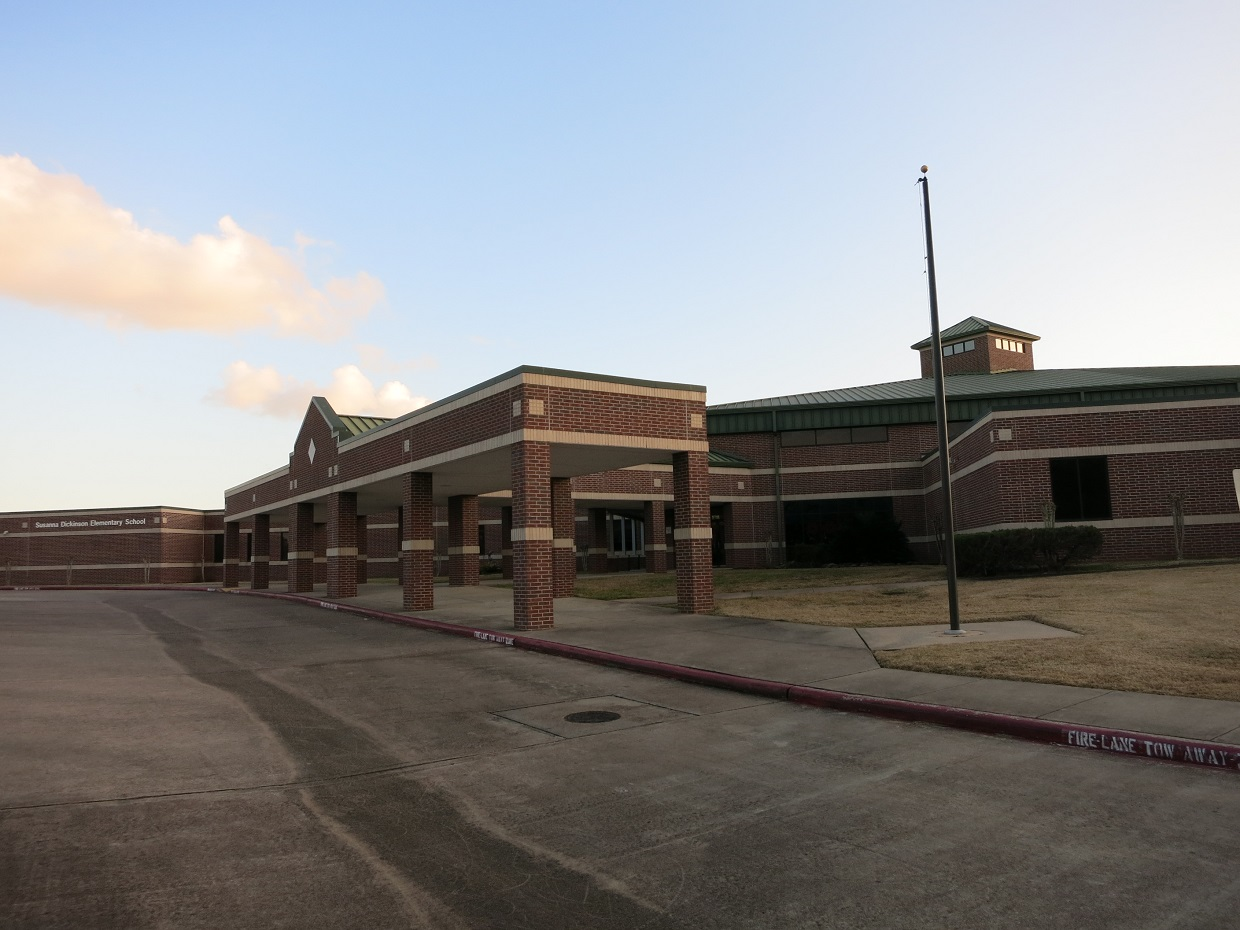
Susanna Dickinson Elementary School

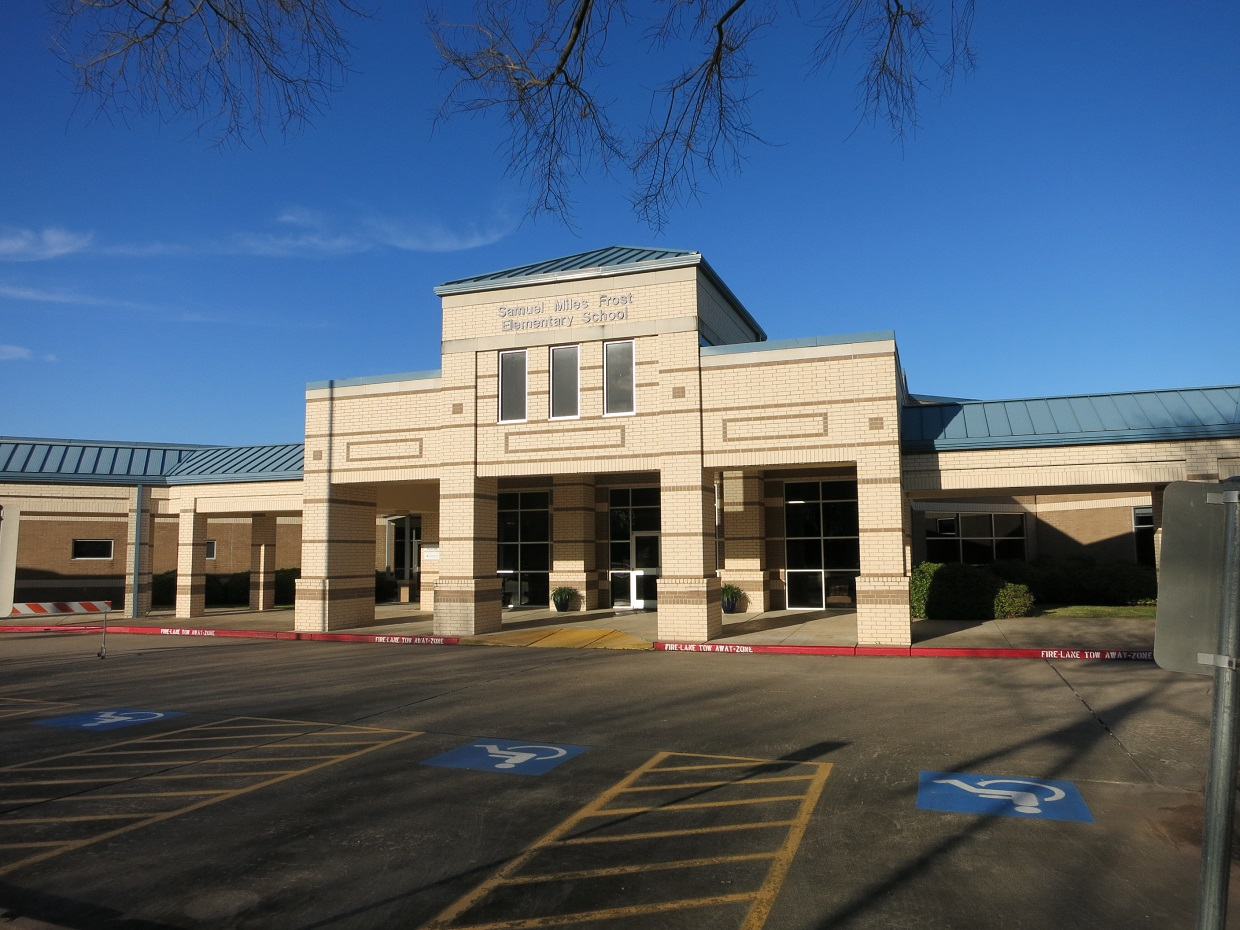
Samuel Miles Frost Elementary School

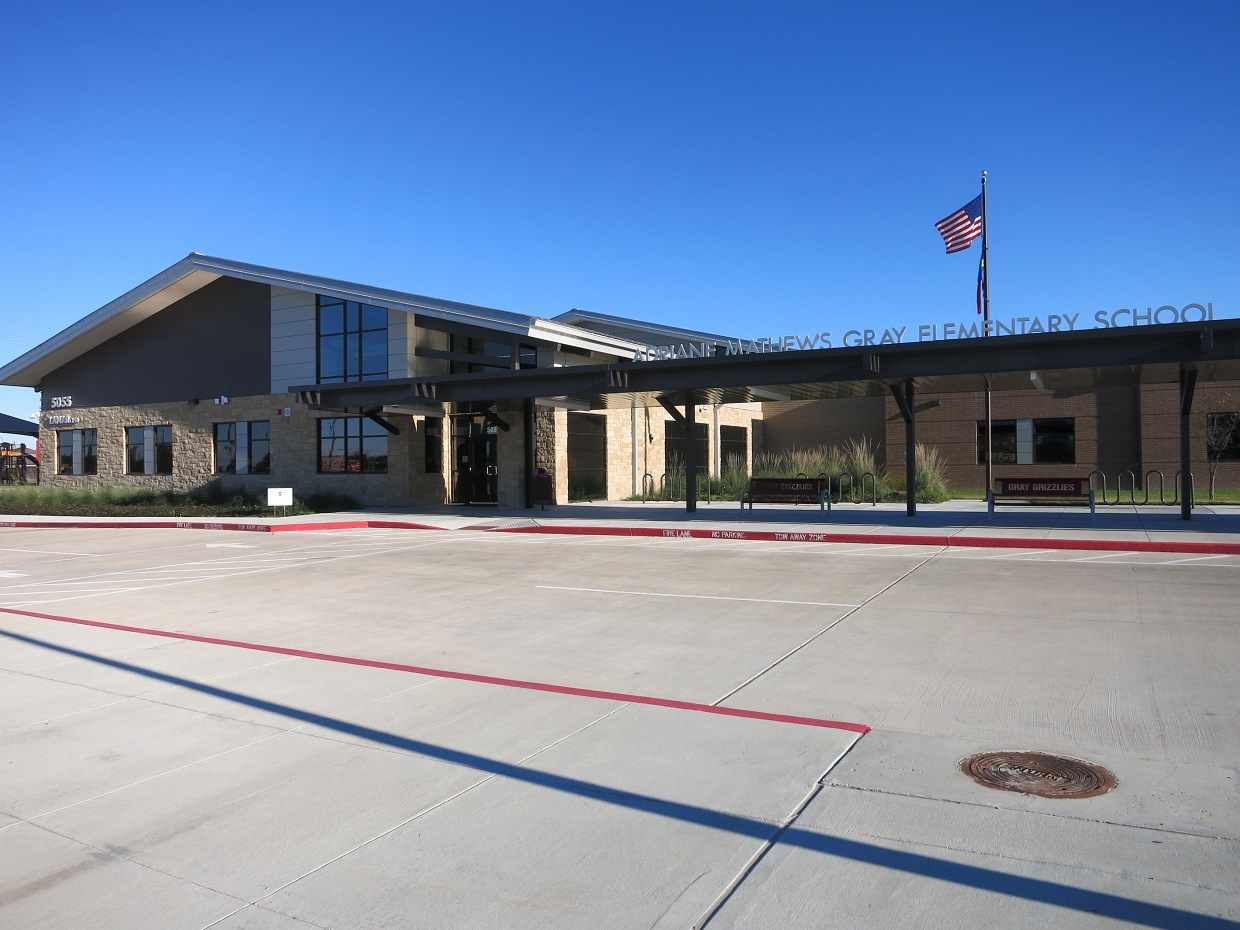
Adriane Mathews Gray Elementary School

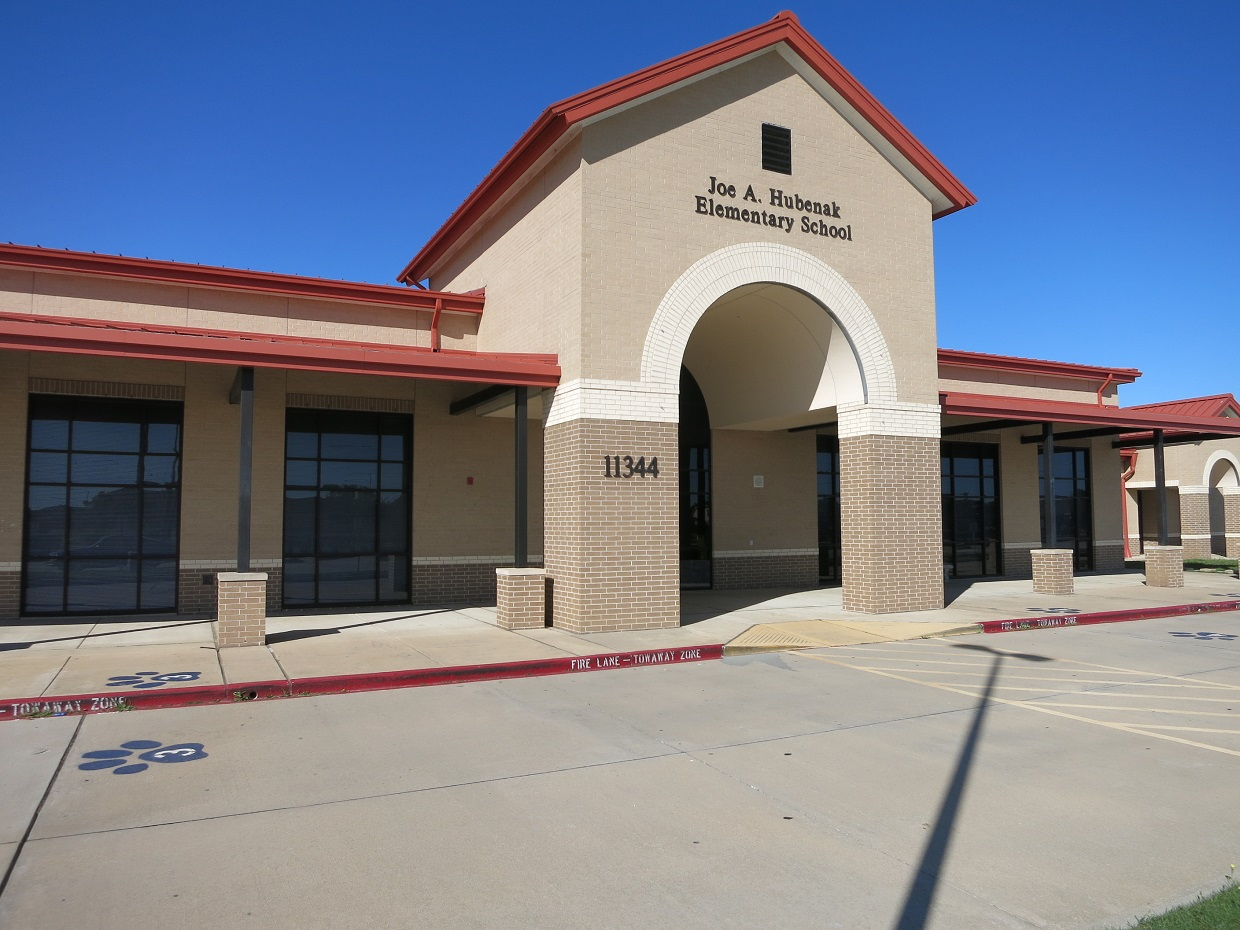
Joe A. Hubenak Elementary School

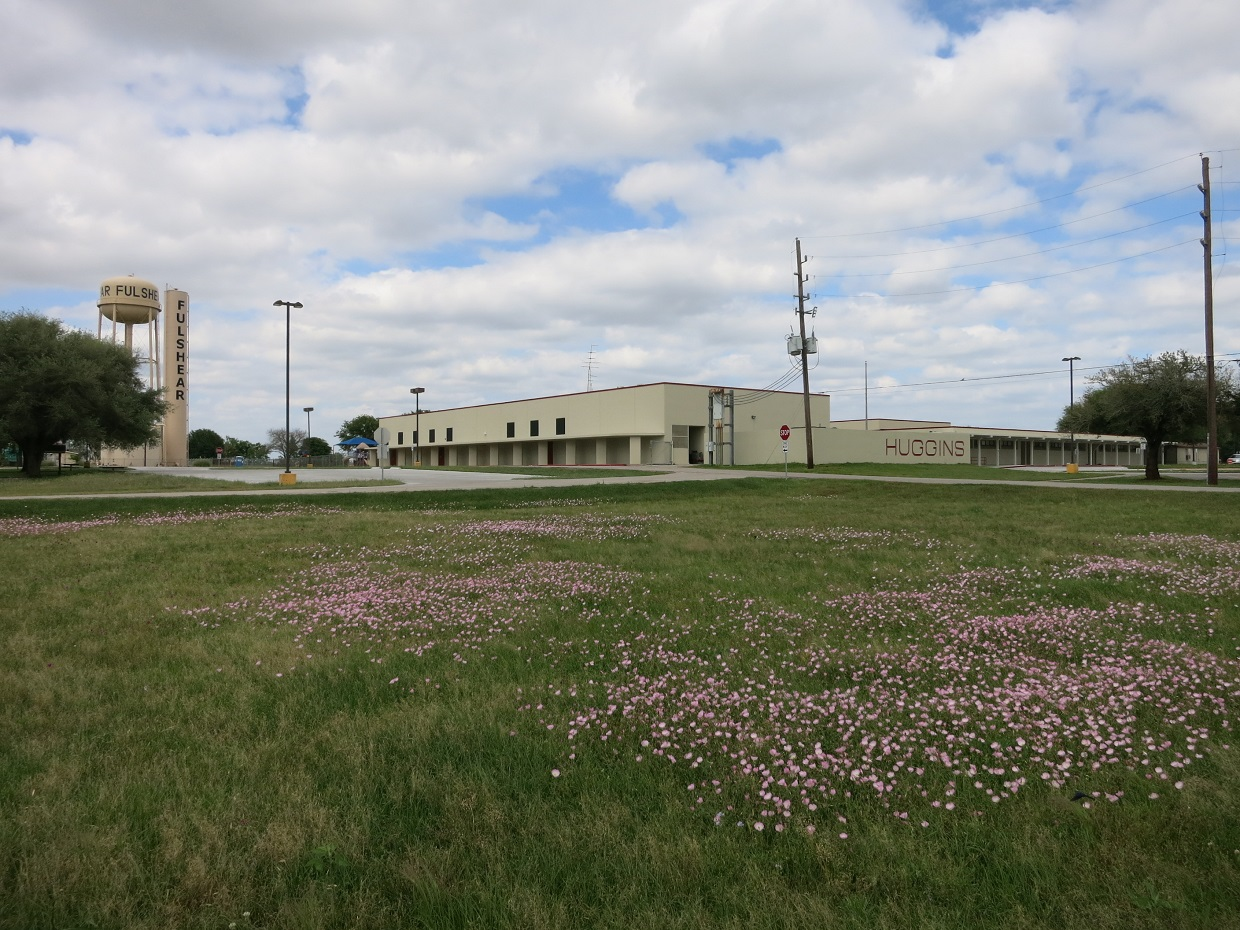
Huggins Elementary School

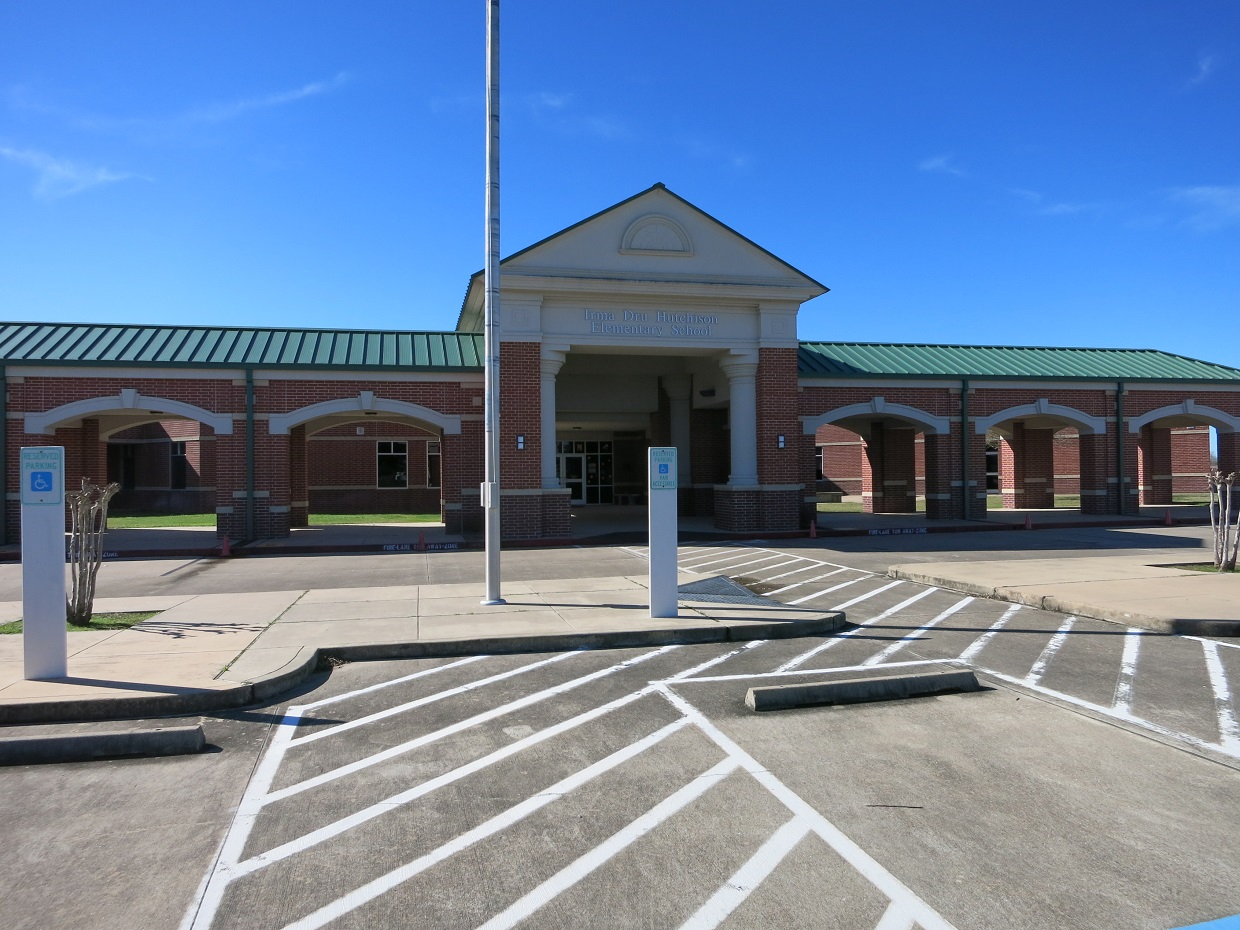
Irma Dru Hutchison Elementary School

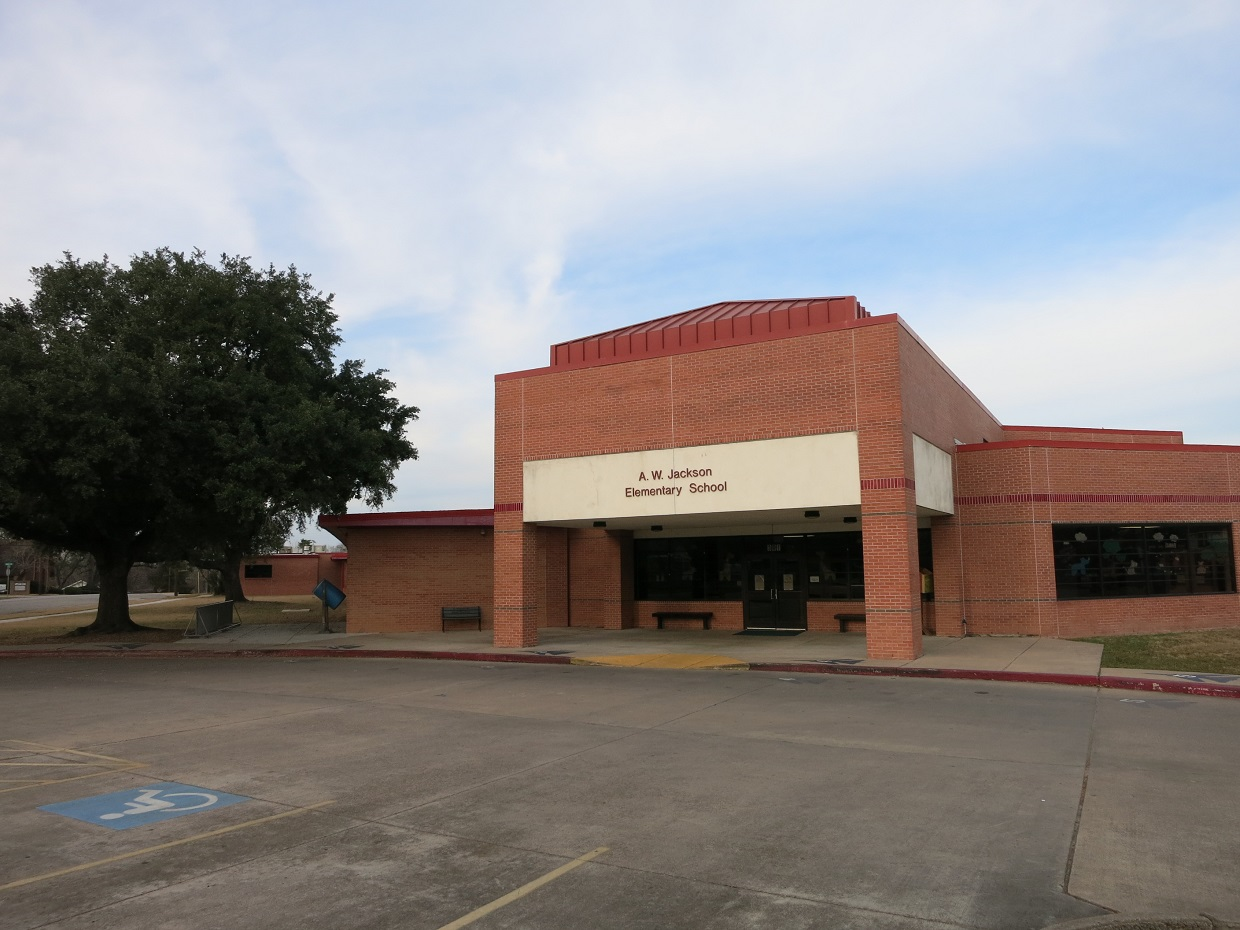
A. W. Jackson Elementary School

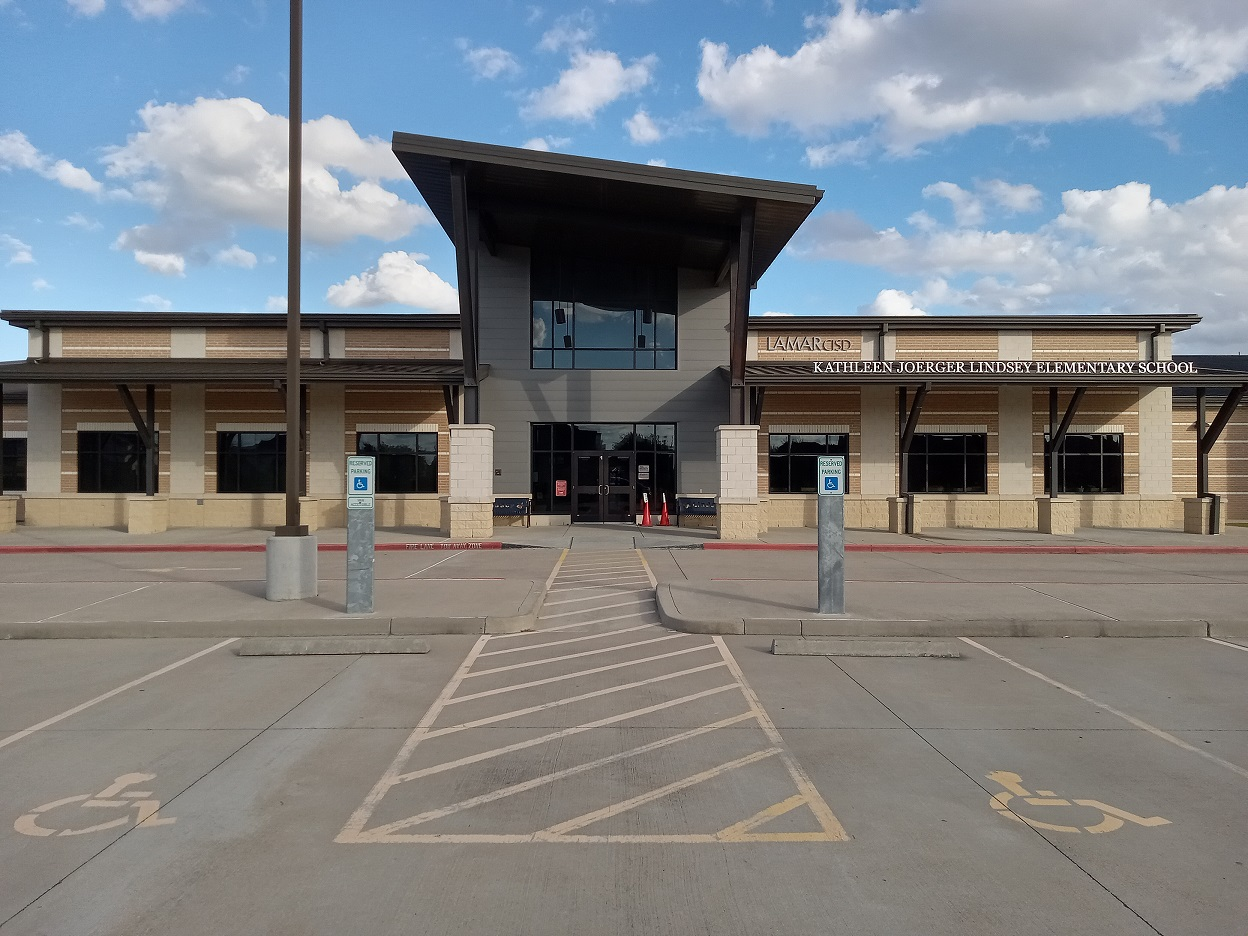
Kathleen Joerger Lindsey Elementary School

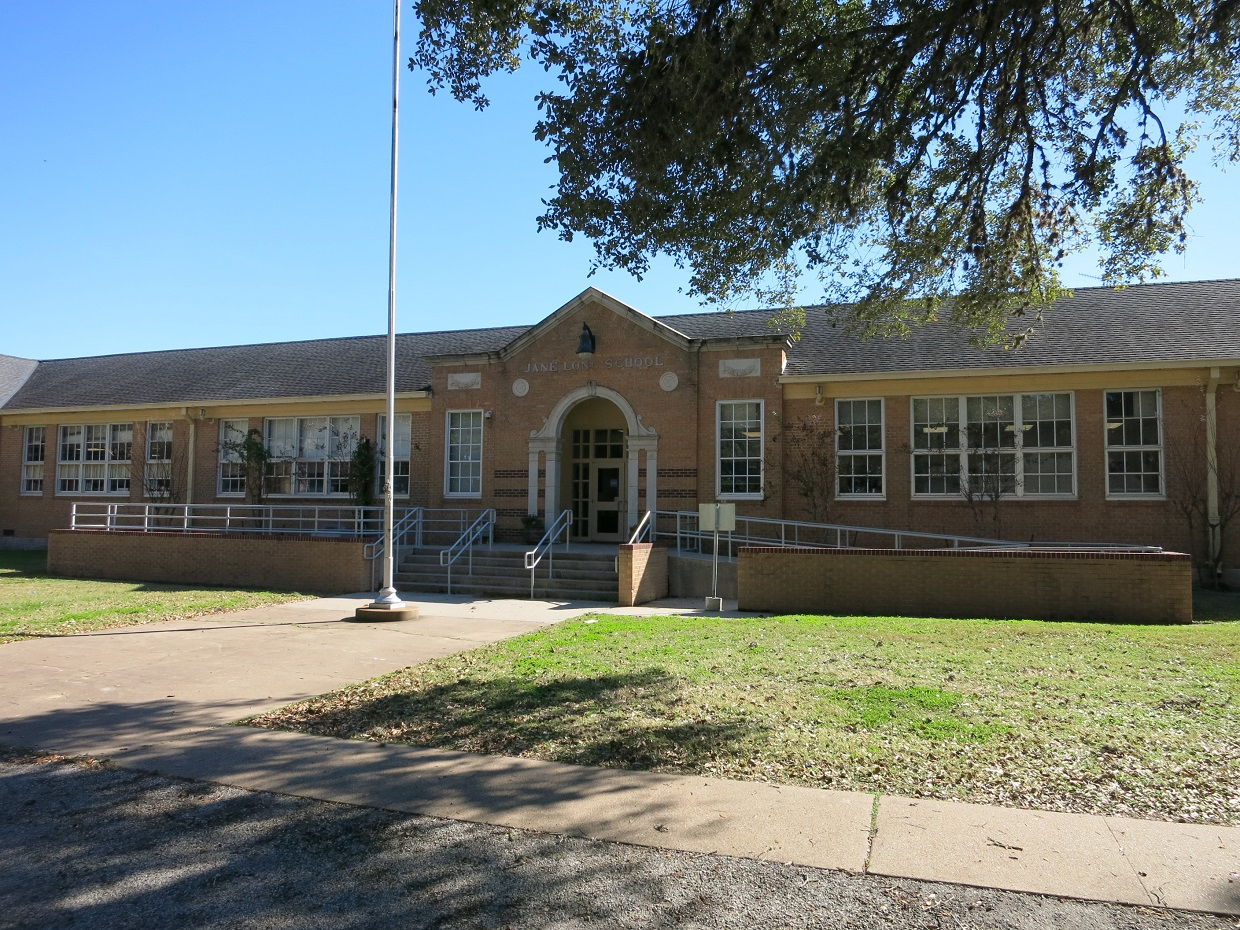
Jane Long Elementary School

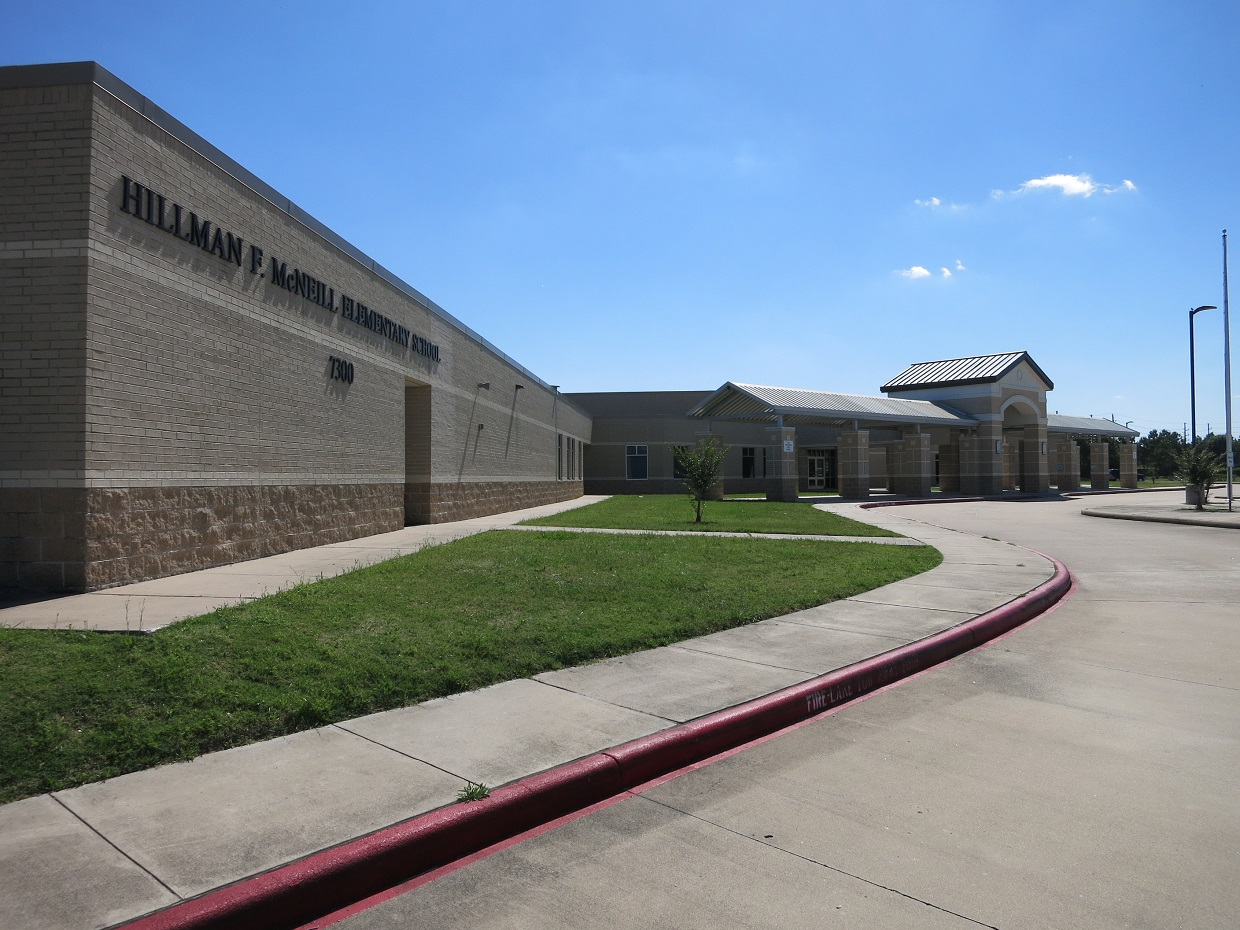
Hillman F. McNeill Elementary School

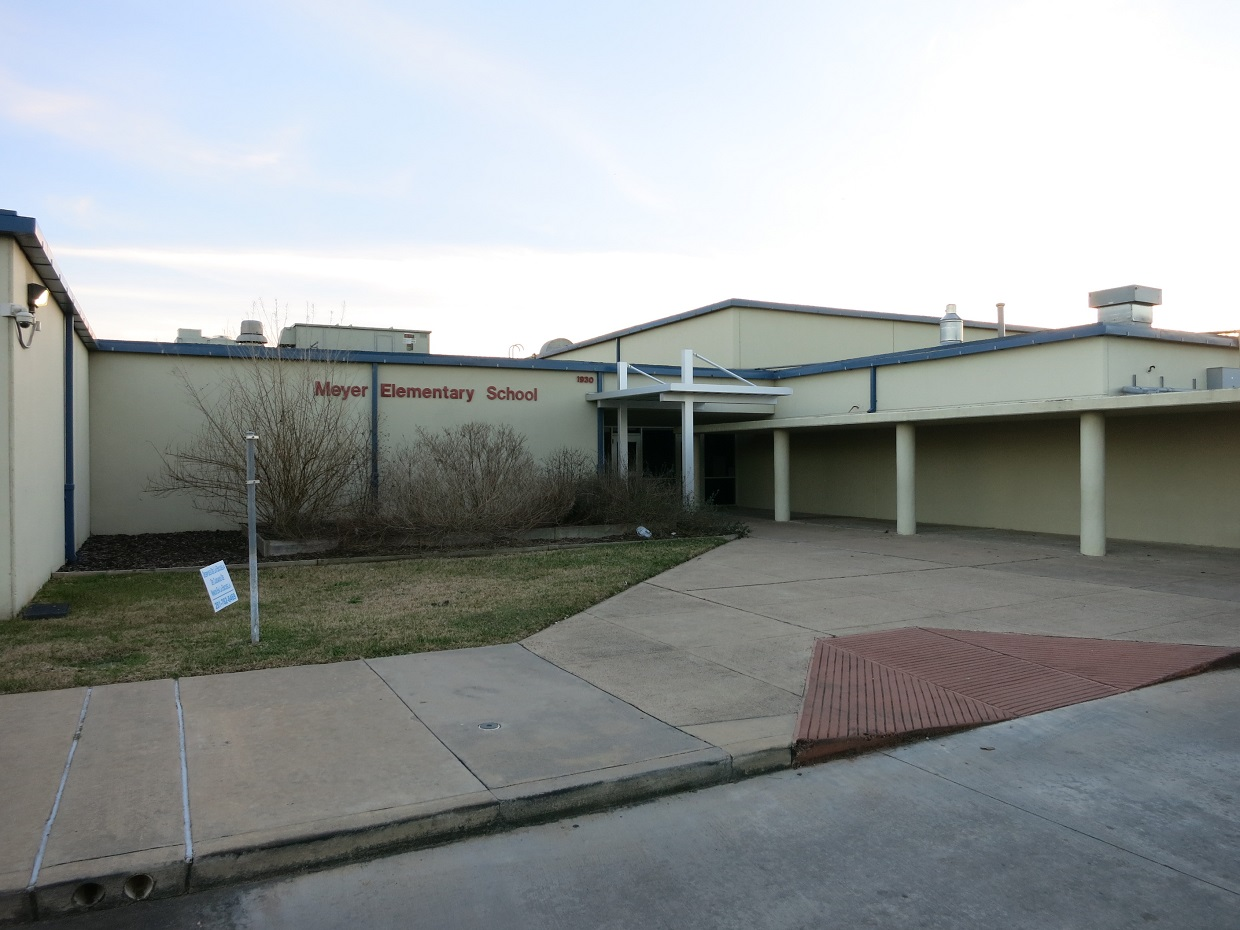
Meyer Elementary School

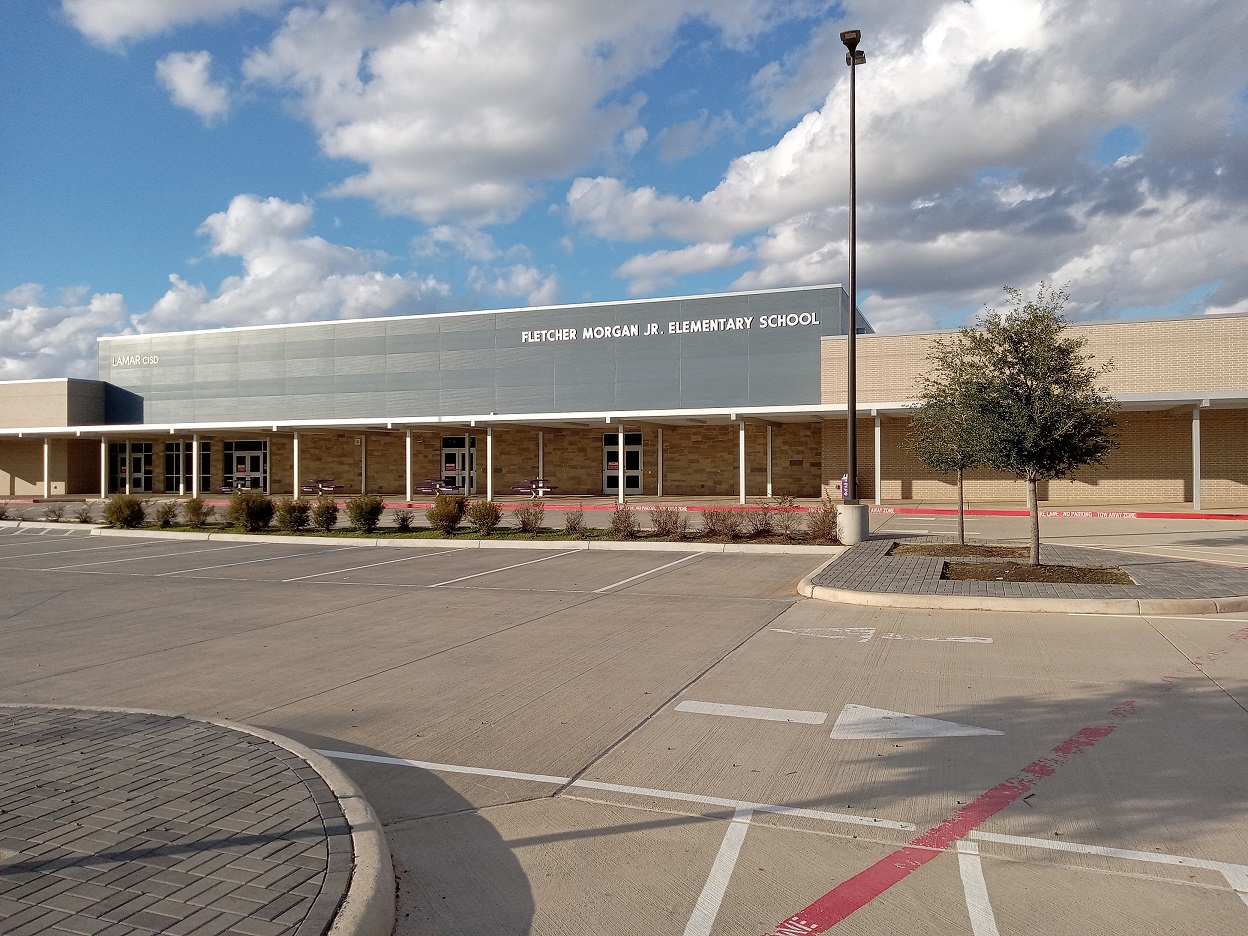
Fletcher Morgan Jr. Elementary School

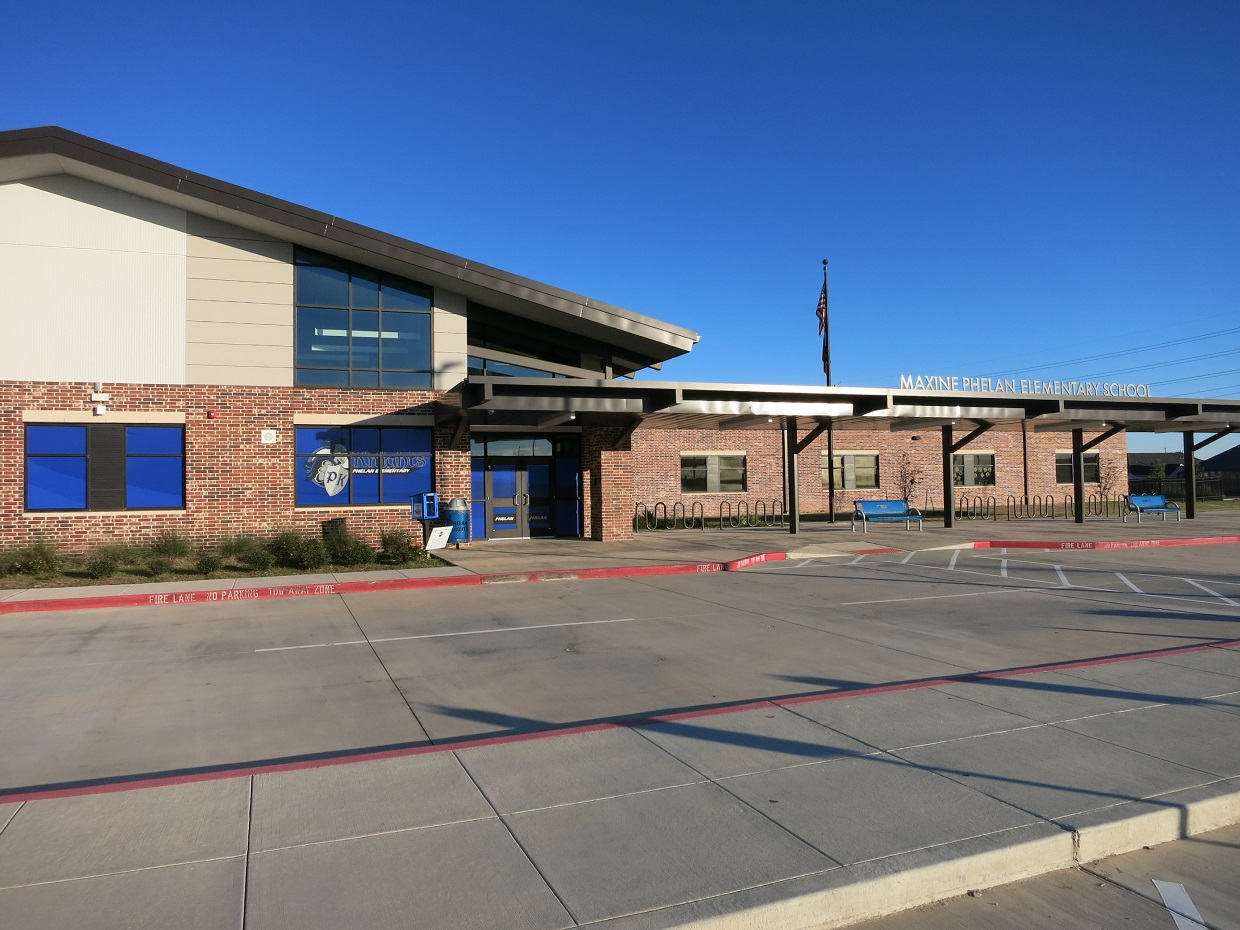
Maxine Phelan Elementary School

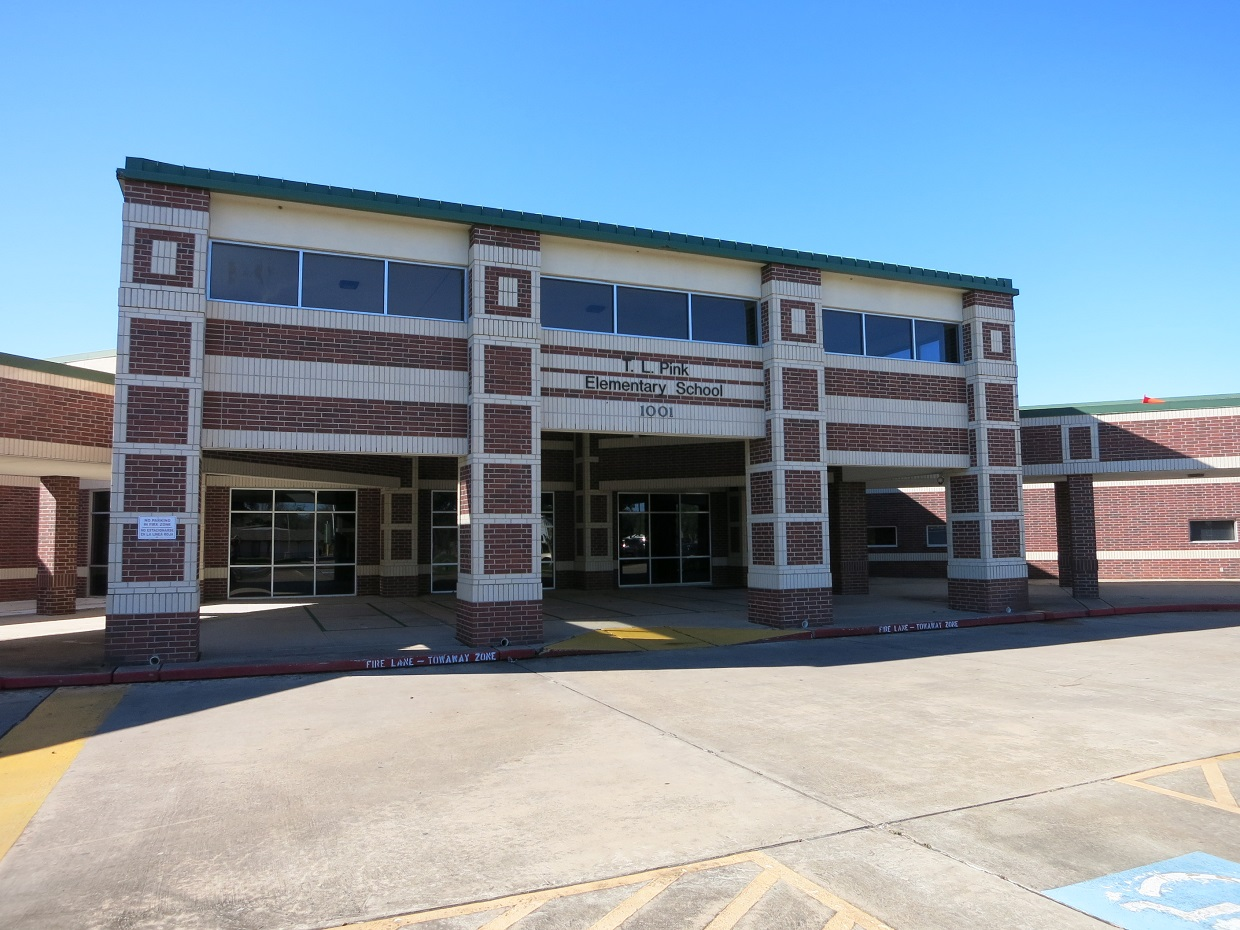
T. L. Pink Elementary School

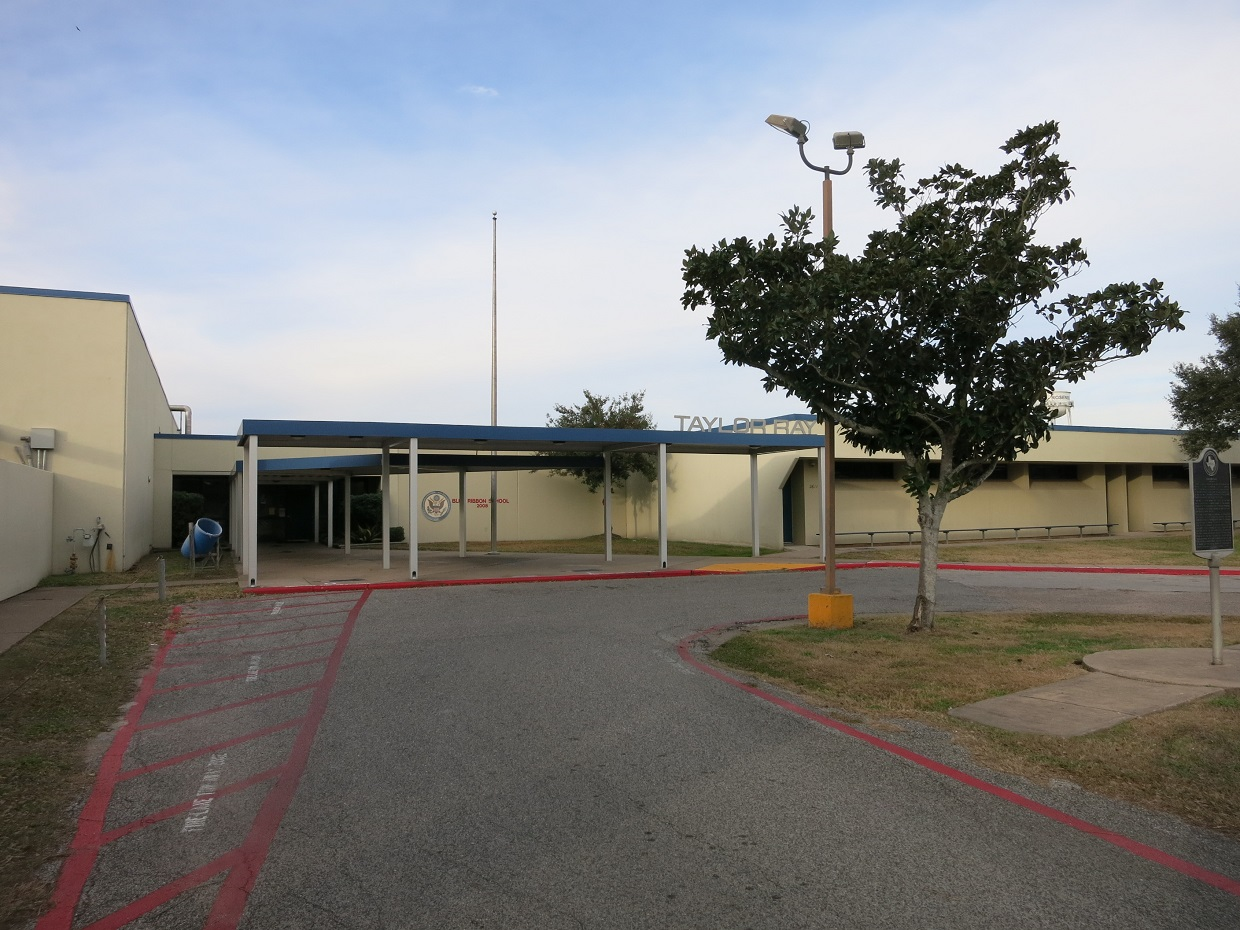
Taylor Ray Elementary School

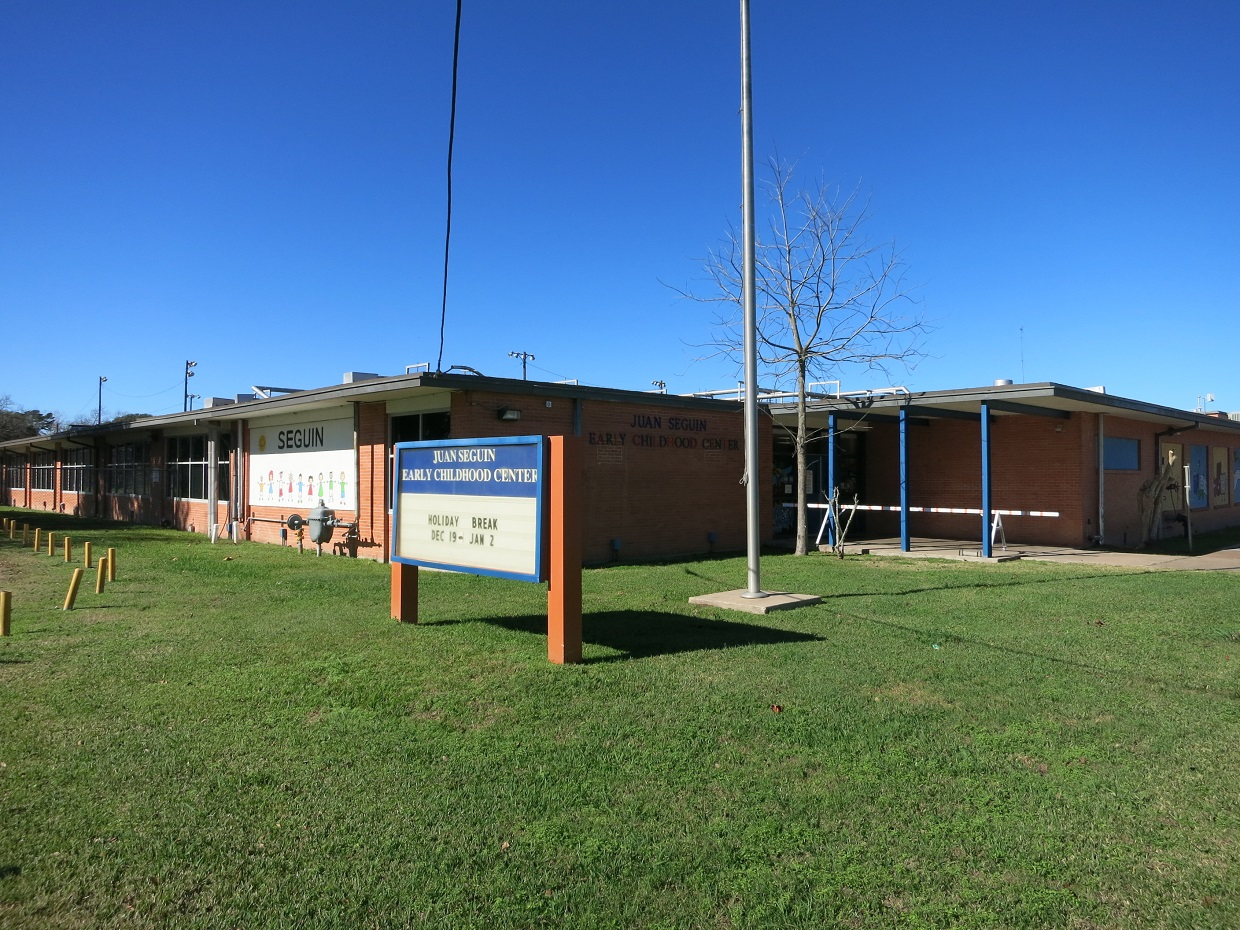
Juan Seguin Early Childhood Center

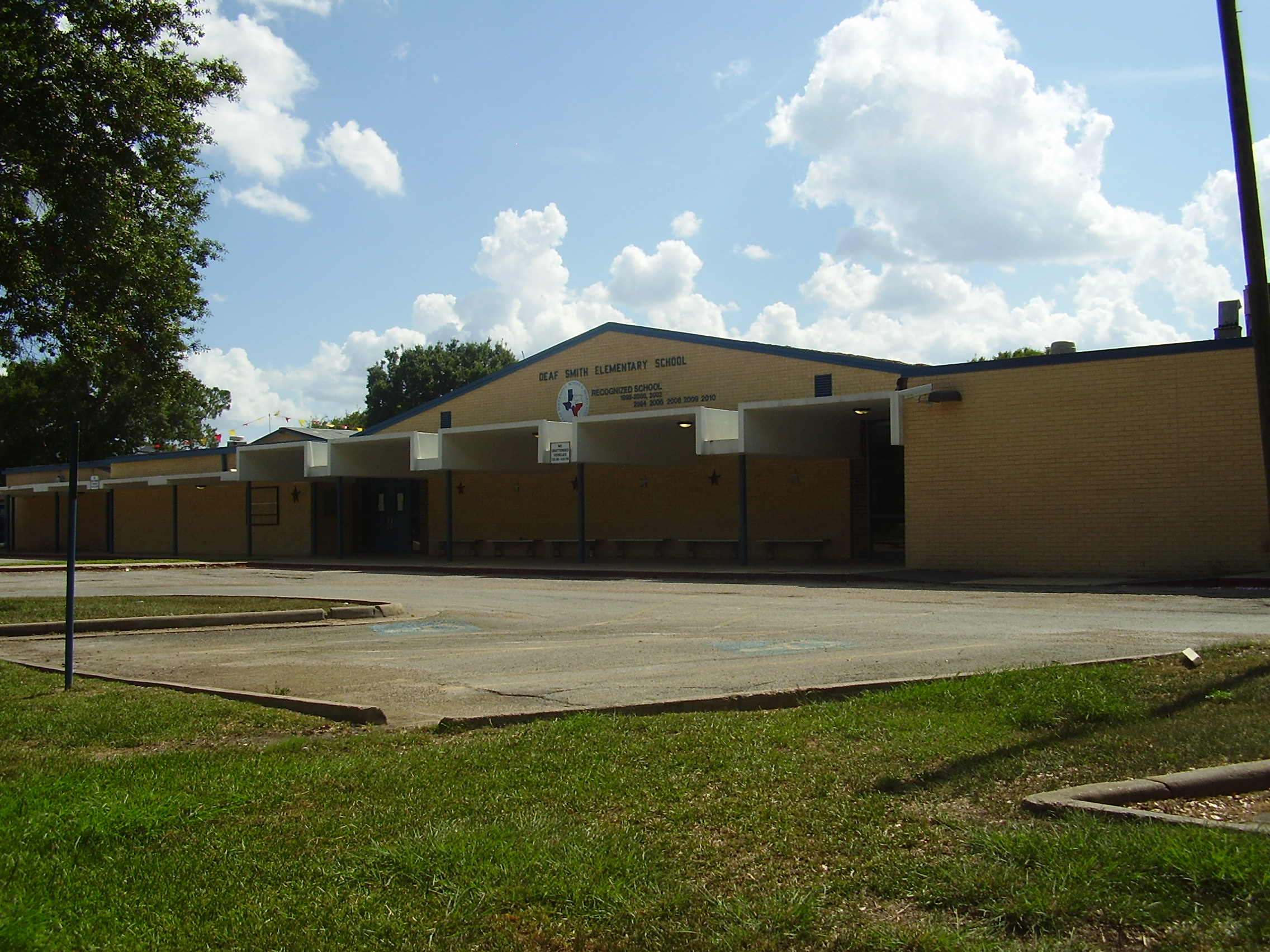
Deaf Smith Elementary School

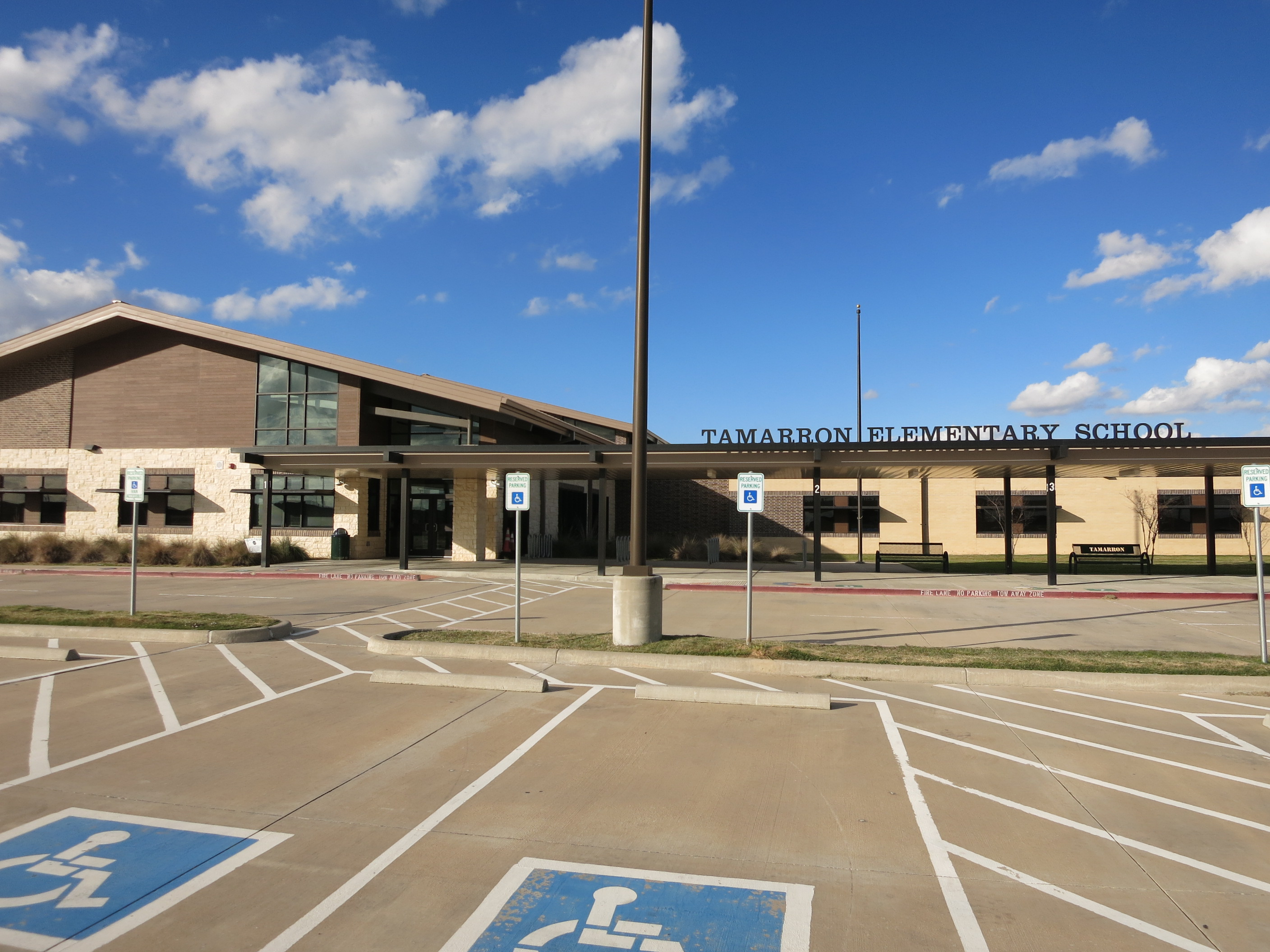
Tamarron Elementary School

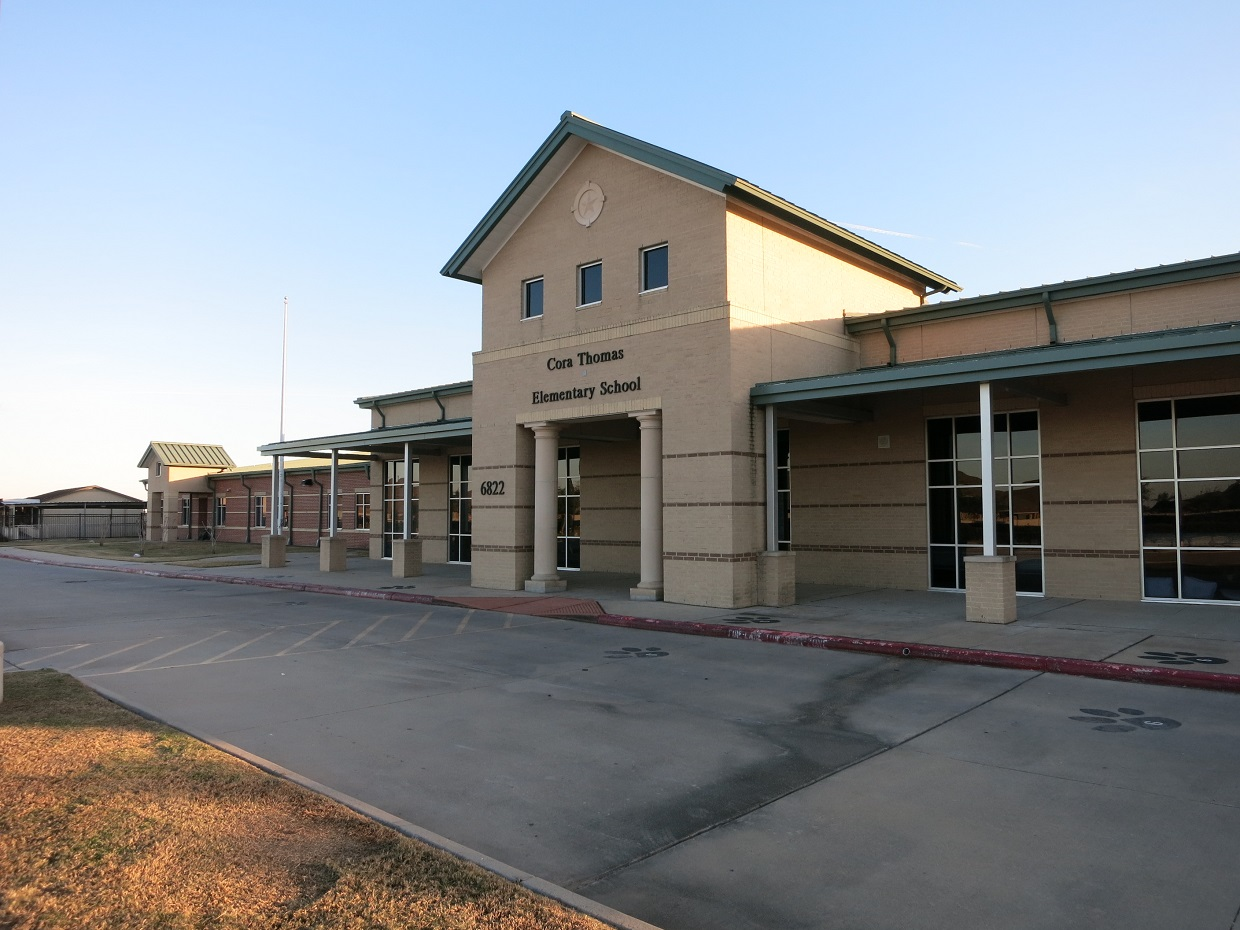
Cora Thomas Elementary School

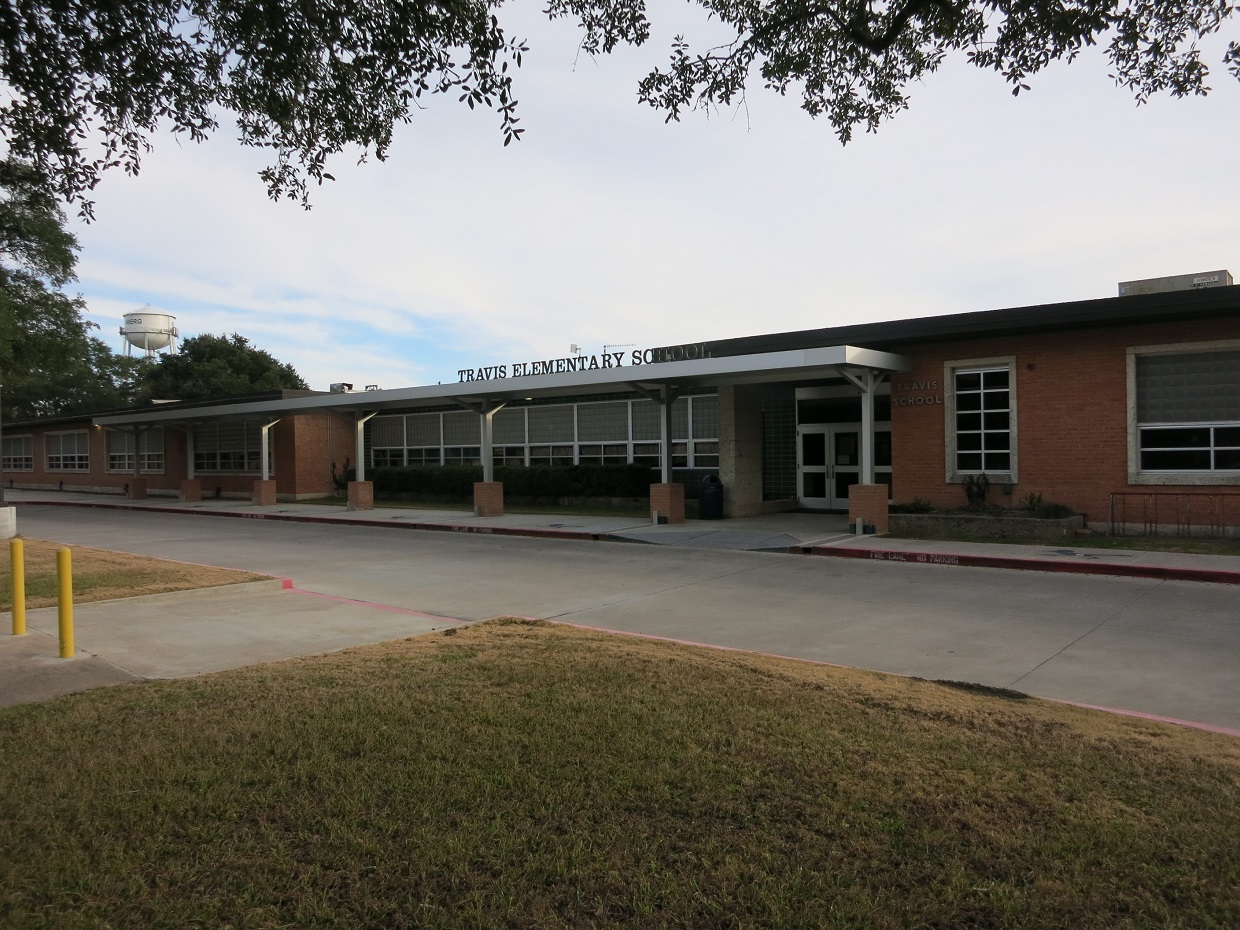
Travis Elementary School

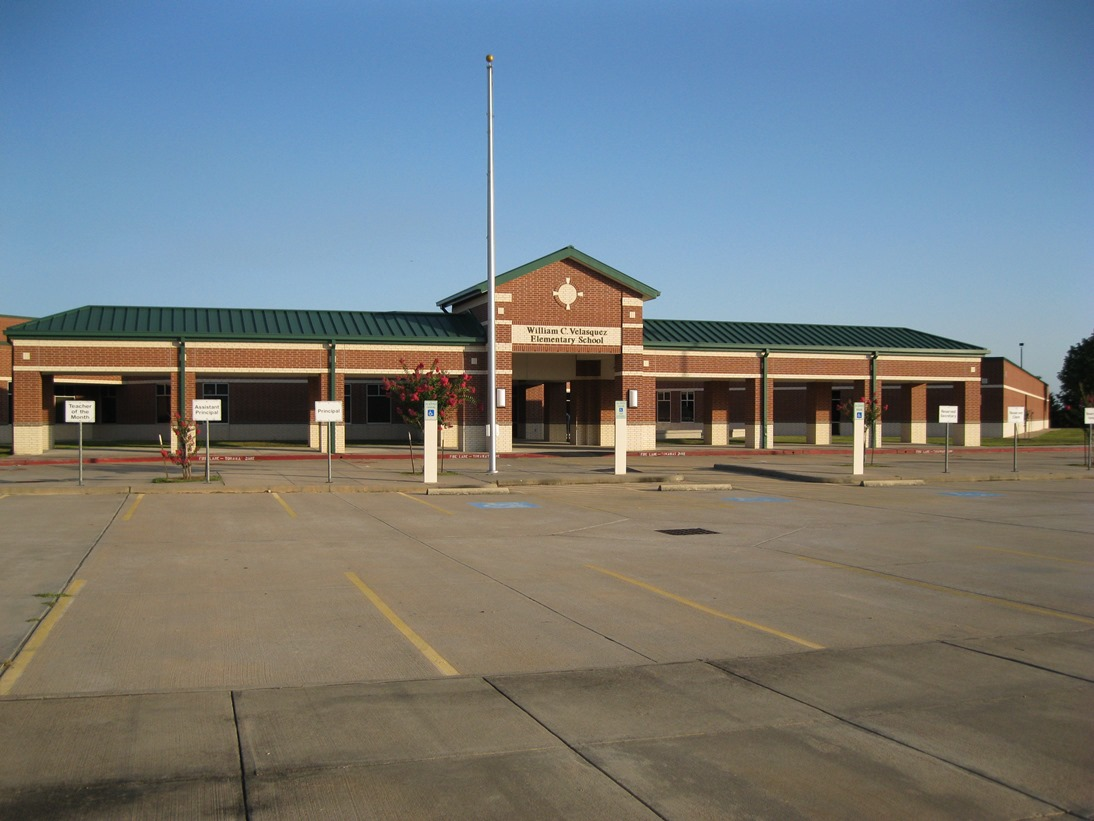
William C. Velasquez Elementary School

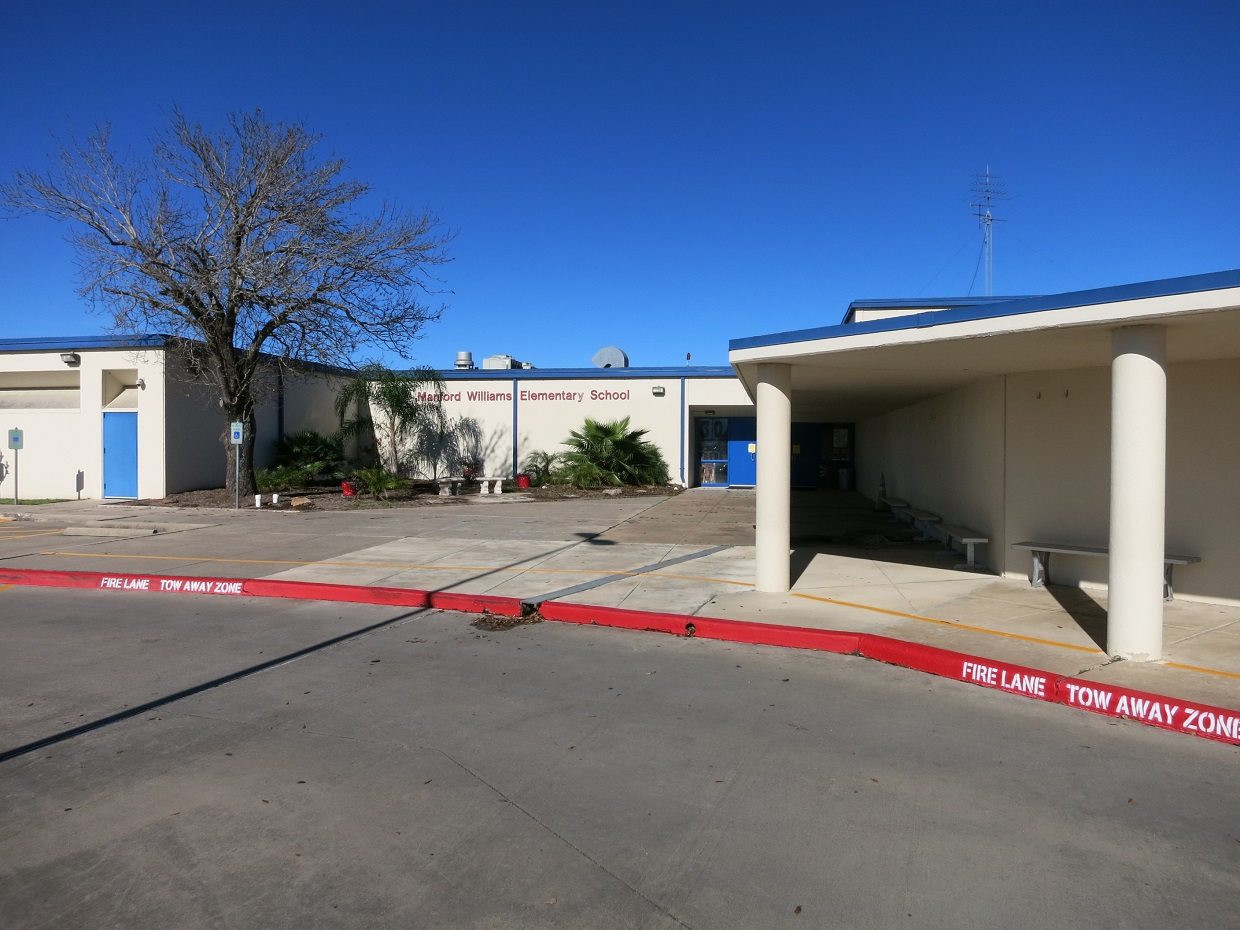
Manford Williams Elementary School

=== Alternative schools ===
In 2017 Beasley Elementary had about 450 students. Beasley Elementary opened in 1902, with eight students. The parent teacher organization opened in 1918. The school became a part of LCISD in 1947. A new building opened in 1985. In 2026 LCISD converted the school into Bright Futures Academy at Beasley Elementary, a district-wide special school for autistic students.
