= Powell Point, Texas =

- Unincorporated community
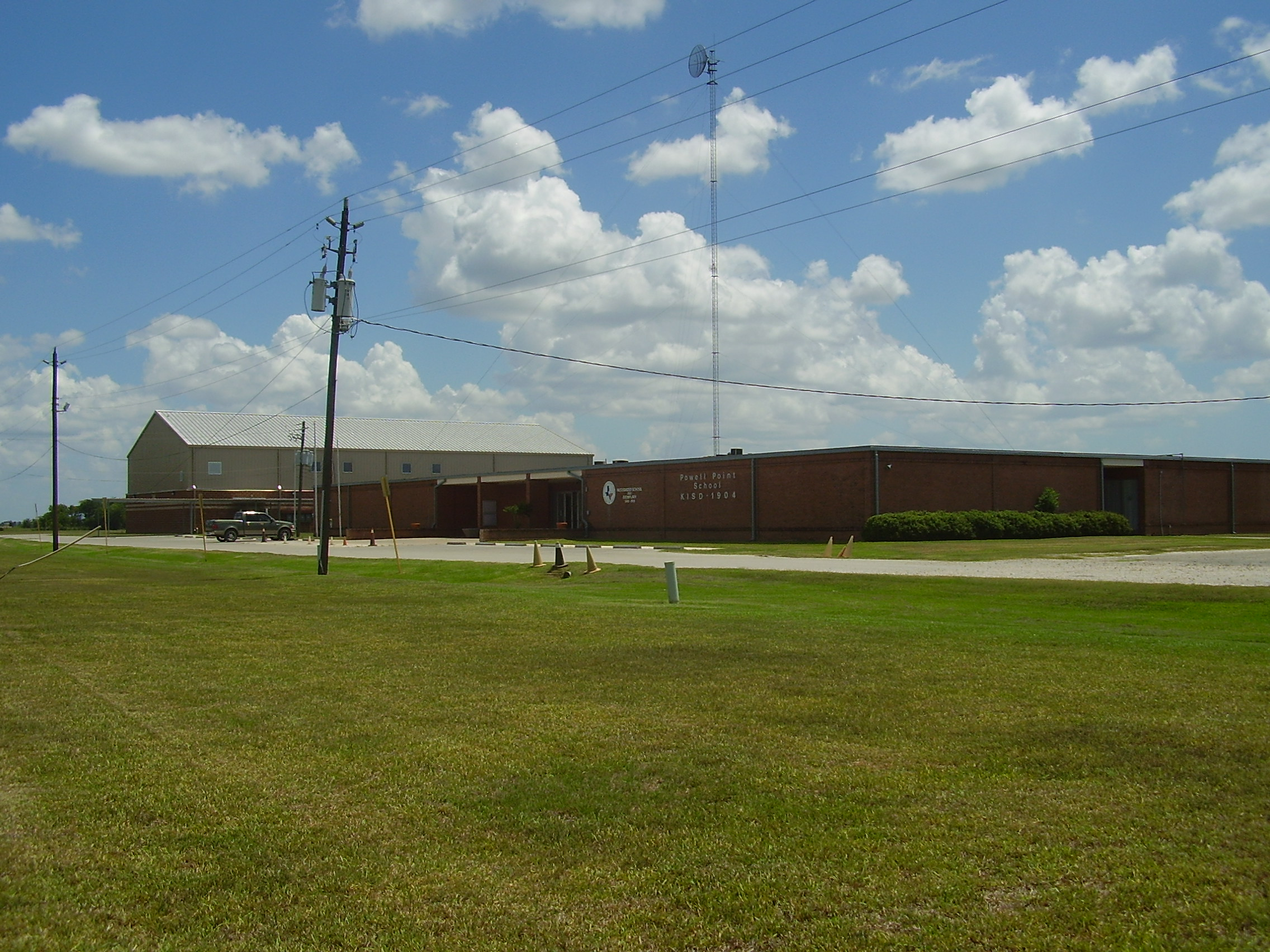
- Powell Point Elementary School

- Location within Texas Location within the United States
- Coordinates: 29°28′46″N 96°1′22″W
- Country: United States
- State: Texas
- County: Fort Bend
- Elevation: 108 ft (33 m)
- Time zone: UTC-6 (Central (CST))
  - Summer (DST): UTC-5 (CDT)
- Area code: 979
- GNIS feature ID: 1344461

Powell Point is an unincorporated community in Fort Bend County, Texas, United States. The community is located within the Greater Houston metropolitan area.

== History ==
County highway maps from the 1930s showed the Powell Point settlement as comprising a church and a few homes. Maps of the area from the early 1990s indicated the location of a church and a cemetery.

== Geography ==
Powell Point is located on Farm to Market Road 2919, 2 mi (3.2 km) northwest of Kendleton in western Fort Bend County.

== Education ==
The Powell Point School was transferred from Kendleton to a neighboring black settlement in the 1890s. The school got its name from its position on the Elizabeth Powell land grant. It was listed on county maps in the 1930s and early 1990s, even though it joined the Kendleton ISD.

Today, Powell Point is served by the Lamar Consolidated Independent School District (LCISD). Students are zoned to Beasley Elementary School in Beasley, and Navarro Middle School, George Junior High, and B.F. Terry High School in Rosenberg. The designated community college for LCISD is Wharton County Junior College.

Previously, Kendleton Independent School District (KISD) operated Powell Point Elementary School in the community and served elementary school residents. Beginning in 1985 LCISD served secondary school students in the KISD territory.
