= Jimmie Lee Solomon =

American lawyer and baseball executive (1956–2020)

- Born: March 11, 1956; Thompsons, Texas, U.S.
- Died: October 8, 2020 (aged 64); Houston, Texas, U.S.
- Education: Dartmouth College; Harvard Law School
- Occupations: Executive vice president of baseball operations (2005–2010); Executive vice president for baseball development (2010–2012)
- Organization: Major League Baseball
- Website: Jimmie Lee Solomon

Jimmie Lee Solomon (March 11, 1956 – October 8, 2020) was an American lawyer and baseball executive. He served as the executive vice president of baseball operations in Major League Baseball (MLB) from 2005 to 2010, before going on to serve as the executive vice president for baseball development from 2010 to 2012. He announced plans in September 2020 to head a subdivision of a private equity firm that would invest in start-up tech firms connected to sports, but died several weeks later.

== Early life and education ==
Solomon was born and raised in Thompsons, Texas, a small town located about 35 miles southwest of Houston with a population of 246 people, according to the 2010 Census. He was one of six children born to Jimmie Lee Solomon Sr., a farmer, and his wife Josephine, who worked at K-Mart in Houston. His grandfather, Jeremiah, was his earliest and most influential role model, as he was college educated and continually encouraged the young Jimmie Lee to excel academically.

Solomon was a graduate of Lamar Consolidated High School in Rosenberg, Texas, held a J.D. degree from Harvard Law School and earned a Bachelor of Arts at Dartmouth College. He played for the Dartmouth football team and established the university's record for the sixty-meter dash.

== Career ==
Solomon became MLB's Director of Minor League Operations in 1991. He subsequently was promoted to executive director of Minor League Operations and then to senior VP of Baseball Operations. He oversaw major, minor and international baseball operations; the MLB scouting bureau, the Arizona Fall League, and numerous special projects, including the launching of the MLB Youth Academy at Compton College, California.

The All-Star Futures Game was conceived by Solomon. Looking for an event to showcase the minor leagues and round out the All-Star week festivities, Solomon looked at the National Basketball Association rookie game and the National Football League's rookie flag football game and thought of the idea. Since 1999, the Futures Game has become a big event for teams' player development departments, a coveted resume filler for players and programming for ESPN2. Rosters for the Futures Game are selected by Baseball America magazine, in conjunction with MLB and the 30 clubs. Every organization is represented, with no more than two players from any organization. In 2003, Solomon was included in Sports Illustrated's list of the 101 Most Influential Minorities in Sports.

Solomon was named executive vice president of Baseball Operations on June 1, 2005. Commissioner Bud Selig made the announcement in a press release. As executive VP, Solomon was responsible for such additional areas as on-field discipline, security, and management of facilities. On August 7, 2007, Solomon was in attendance during the game in which Barry Bonds broke the all-time home run record previously held by Hank Aaron in place of Selig.

In June 2010, Solomon became MLB's executive vice president for baseball development, putting him in control of academies in the United States and Puerto Rico run by MLB, minor league operations and the Civil Rights Game held annually.

Solomon resigned from his role with Major League Baseball on June 12. Former Yankees and Dodgers manager Joe Torre was appointed as his successor in the executive vice president of Baseball Operations position.

== Later life ==
Solomon announced that he would become president of Playrs, a branch of the private equity firm Turn2 Equity Partners, in late September 2020. The group included other MLB individuals such as manager Dusty Baker, as well as general managers Jim Duquette and Bobby Evans. However, he died several weeks later at his home in Houston, on October 8, 2020. He was 64; the cause of death is not known.

== Sources ==
- Official website of Jimmie Lee Solomon
- Baseball America
- Dartmouth College
- Ivy League Sports
- PBS – Baseball Blues

Preceded by Sandy Alderson	Major League Baseball Executive Vice President for Baseball Operations; 2005–2010	Succeeded by Joe Torre
