= Lamar Consolidated High School =

Public school in Texas, United States

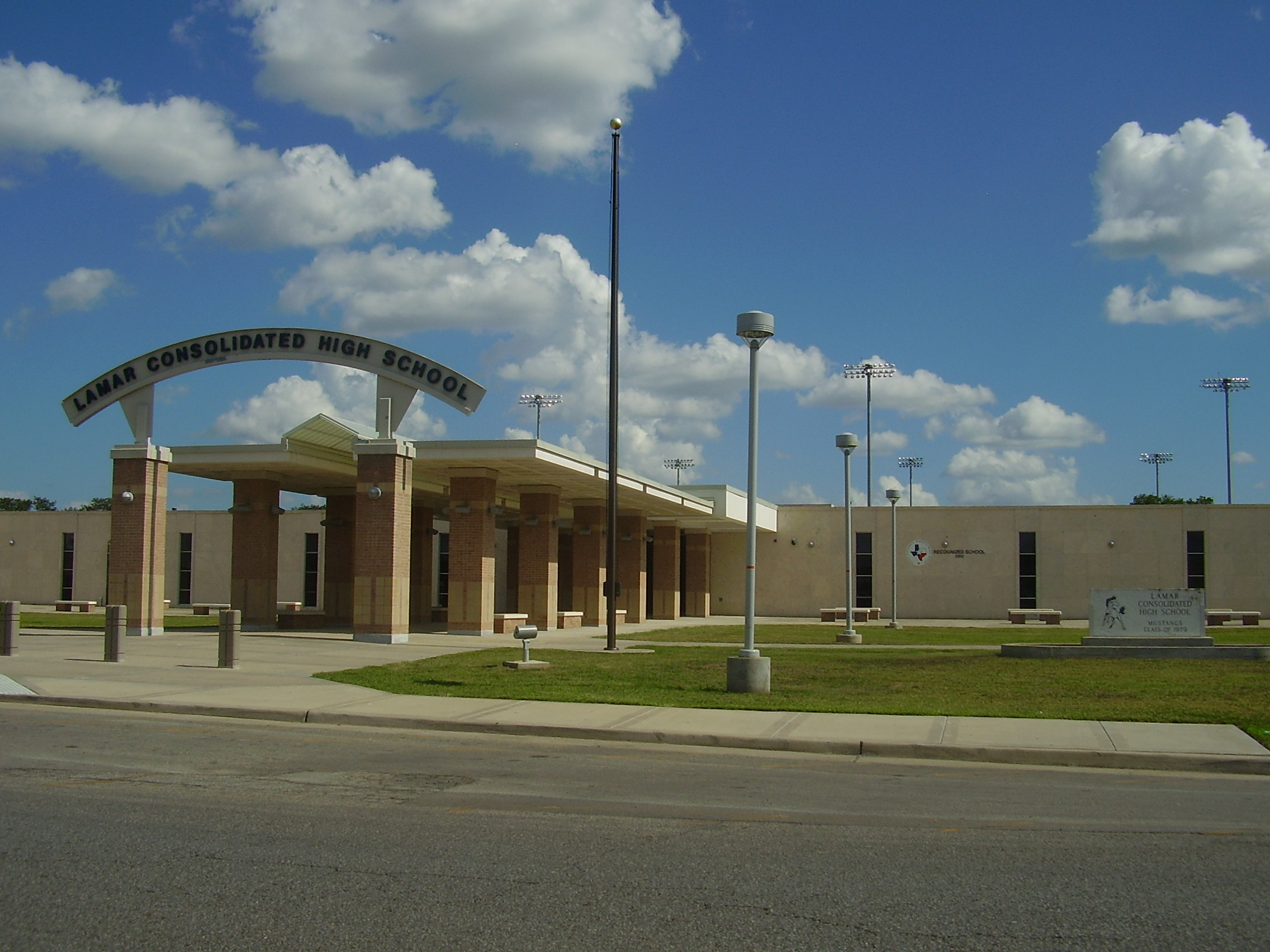
- Lamar Consolidated High School

Location
- 4606 Mustang Avenue; Rosenberg, Texas 77471; United States; 29°33′38″N 95°46′46″W

Information
- School type: Public high school Regular school
- Motto: Mustang Pride
- Established: 1949
- School district: Lamar Consolidated Independent School District
- NCES District ID: 4826580
- NCES School ID: 482658002988
- Principal: Sierra King
- Teaching staff: 92.06 (FTE)
- Grades: 9–12
- Enrollment: 1,738 (2023–2024)
  - Grade 9: 444
  - Grade 10: 464
  - Grade 11: 455
  - Grade 12: 375
- Student to teacher ratio: 18.88 (2023–2024)
- Campus size: 5A
- Campus type: Suburban
- Colors: Blue and Gray
- Mascot: Mustangs
- Website: lamarchs.lcisd.org

Lamar Consolidated High School is a grades 9–12 school located in Rosenberg, Texas, United States. The school, which serves the City of Richmond, parts of Rosenberg, and unincorporated areas of Fort Bend County, is a part of the Lamar Consolidated Independent School District (LCISD). All areas served by LCHS are within the Houston metropolitan area.

In 2005–06, this school was rated "Acceptable" by the Texas Education Agency.

== Facts ==
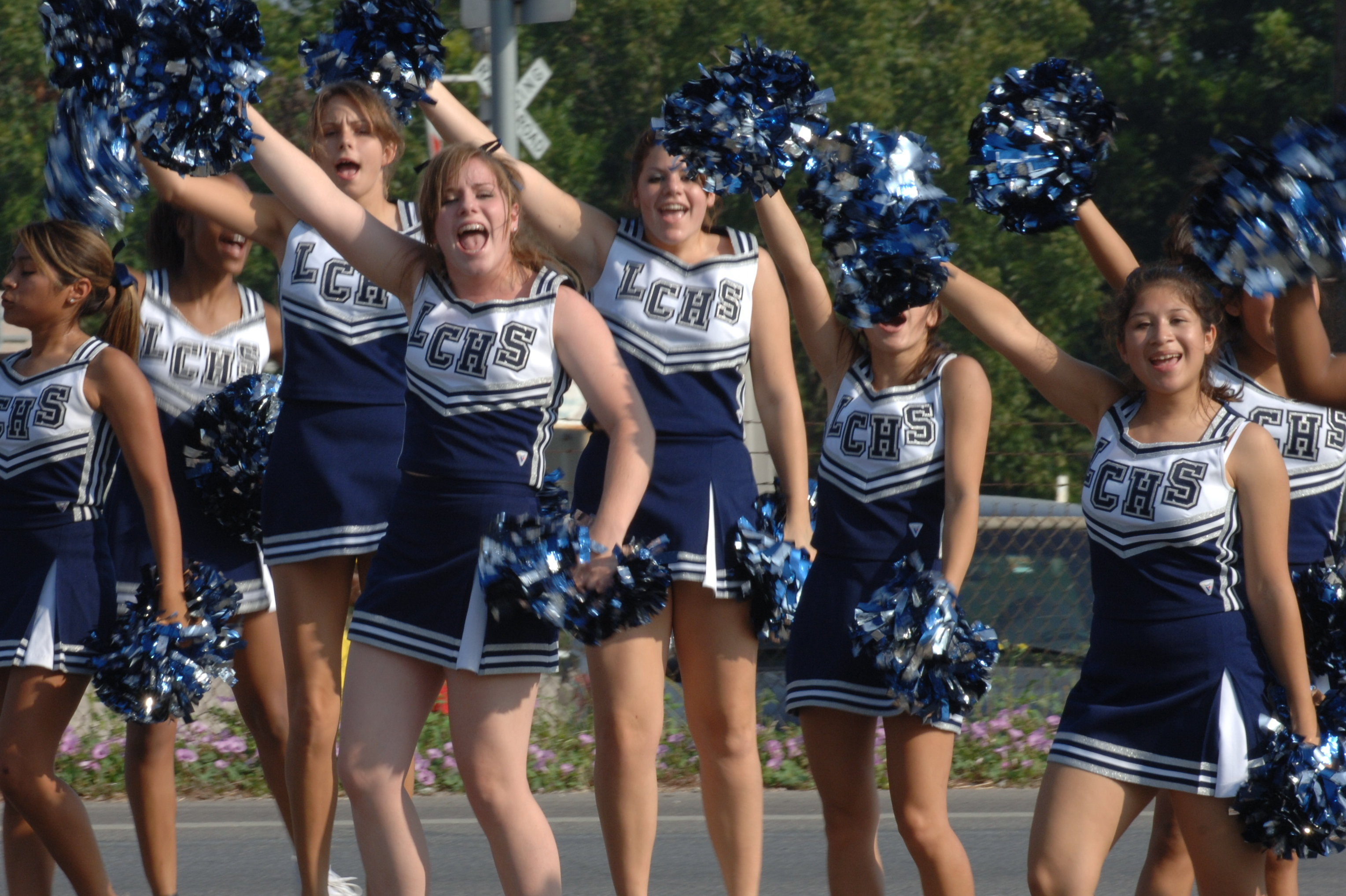
Lamar Consolidated High School cheerleaders at the 2007 Fort Bend County Fair

- First opened in 1948.
- student body: 1679.
- Percent of graduates: 75 percent (not including drop-outs before senior year)
- The 2010-2012 UIL realignment places LCHS in district 23-4A, along with El Campo, Bay City, Terry, Foster, Angleton, and Brazosport.
- The psychological thriller "Apart" was filmed in Lamar Consolidated High School, along with its football field, Traylor Stadium. Some scenes were also filmed at Foster High School.
- The school's lone state football championship is chronicled in Dr. Brent Melloy's book, UNHERALDED: How Jacquizz Rodgers led the 2007 Lamar Consolidated Mustangs to an improbable Texas State Championship.

Its attendance boundary includes sections of Rosenberg and areas within the city limits of Richmond. Previously the boundary included Greatwood, and Kendleton.

== Feeder schools ==
Lamar CISD calls this feeder system the "Blue Track." Feeder junior high and middle schools share the LCHS colors and mascot.

=== Junior high school ===
- Lamar Junior High School

=== Middle school ===
- Wessendorff Middle School

=== Elementary schools ===
- Arredondo Elementary School
- Austin Elementary School^{1}
- T.L. Pink Elementary School^{1}
- Jane Long Elementary School^{1}
- Deaf Smith Elementary School^{1}
- Irma Dru Hutchison Elementary School^{1}
- Beasley Elementary School

^{1}These are the elementary schools that are entirely zoned to Lamar Consolidated High School.

== Athletics ==
=== Football ===
- 2007 Texas 4A State Champions
- 2006 Texas 4A State Semifinalist

=== Lamar Consolidated Baseball ===
- 9 District Championships
- 22 Playoff Appearances

== Notable alumni ==
=== Sports ===
- Burt Lancon - Olympic figure skater, 6th place in 1984 Winter Olympics
- Lance Zierlein - Sports talk show host on ESPN 97.5 FM in Houston, Texas

==== NFL ====
- Antoine Everett - former NFL offensive lineman for the Tampa Bay Buccaneers & Pittsburgh Steelers
- Alan Faneca – 9-time Pro Bowler (2001-2009), 2021 NFL hall of fame inductee, 8-time All-Pro (2001-2008) NFL offensive lineman for Arizona Cardinals, Pittsburgh Steelers and New York Jets, Super Bowl XL champion
- Donald Hollas – former NFL quarterback for Cincinnati Bengals and Oakland Raiders
- Pierce Holt – former NFL defensive lineman, 1992 Pro Bowler and 2nd-team All-Pro for San Francisco 49ers
- Earnest Jackson – 2-time Pro Bowl (1984, 1986) NFL running back for San Diego Chargers, Philadelphia Eagles and Pittsburgh Steelers
- Bobby Jancik - former NFL cornerback for the Houston Oilers
- Michael Lewis – 2004 Pro Bowler NFL, safety of Philadelphia Eagles and San Francisco 49ers
- Jacquizz Rodgers - running back for Tampa Bay Buccaneers
- James Rodgers - wide receiver for CFL's Montreal Alouettes

==== MLB ====
- Randal Grichuk - MLB outfielder for the Toronto Blue Jays and later traded to the Colorado Rockies.
- Jimmie Lee Solomon - Major League Baseball Executive Vice President of Baseball Operations 2005-2010

=== Music ===
- B. J. Thomas – singer-songwriter, known for "Raindrops Keep Fallin' on My Head," "Hooked on a Feeling," "Somebody Done Somebody Wrong Song," and "As Long As We Got Each Other," the theme song from Growing Pains
- John Holiday - operatic countertenor who has appeared in supporting and leading roles with several American opera companies
