= Donald Hollas =

American football player (born 1967)

No. 12
- Position: Quarterback

Personal information
- Born: November 22, 1967 (age 58); Kingsville, Texas, U.S.
- Listed height: 6 ft 3 in (1.91 m)
- Listed weight: 215 lb (98 kg)

Career information
- High school: Lamar Consolidated (Rosenberg, Texas)
- College: Rice
- NFL draft: 1991: 4th round, 99th overall pick

Career history
- Cincinnati Bengals (1991–1994); Detroit Lions (1995)*; Houston Oilers (1996)*; Washington Redskins (1997)*; Texas Terror (1997); Oakland Raiders (1997–1998); Detroit Lions (1999)*
- * Offseason or practice squad member only

Career NFL statistics
- Passing attempts: 375
- Passing completions: 202
- Completion percentage: 53.9%
- TD–INT: 13–21
- Passing yards: 2,399
- Passer rating: 61.8
- Stats at Pro Football Reference

Donald Wayne Hollas (born November 22, 1967) is an American former professional football player who was a quarterback in the National Football League (NFL) for six seasons during the 1990s. He played college football for Rice University and thereafter was selected by the Cincinnati Bengals in the fourth round of the 1991 NFL draft. Hollas also played for the Oakland Raiders.

== Early life and college ==
Hollas played his high school football in Rosenberg, Texas at Lamar Consolidated High School before playing at Rice University in the Southwest Conference from 1987 to 1990.

While at Rice, Hollas played both Defensive Back and Quarterback and in 1988 also punted for the Owls. In his Freshman and Sophomore seasons he played in 22 games at DB while also completing 34 passes for 416 yards and 2 touchdowns. In 1989, he became the starting quarterback playing in 9 games and passing for 1,815 yards on 156 completions with 5 touchdowns and 9 interceptions. He also ran for 431 yards and 7 touchdowns. In his Senior season, Hollas completed 151 of 265 passes for 1,808 yards and 8 touchdown to 18 interceptions and added an impressive 11 rushing touchdowns on 122 carries for 195 yards.

== Professional career ==
Hollas played in 20 games between 1991–1994 for the Cincinnati Bengals. He participated in training camp with the Detroit Lions and Houston Oilers in 1995 and 1996 and spent the 1997 off-season with the Washington Redskins before making the roster of the Oakland Raiders later that year.

Hollas played in the Arena Football League with the Texas Terror before signing with the Raiders in 1997. Going into the 1998 season with Oakland, Hollas had only attempted two passes in the NFL since 1992. However, after an injury to starter Jeff George, Hollas saw significant action with the Raiders that season. Oakland was on a two-game winning streak when Hollas took over the 3–2 Raiders starting job, after helping them to a 23–20 victory over Arizona the week before with a touchdown run. Then, he promptly led the Raiders to three more victories in a row for a five-game winning streak and a 6–2 record at the halfway point under first-year head coach Jon Gruden. As the second half of the season commenced, the Raiders lost four out their next five games to drop to a 7–6 record. During that stretch Hollas threw 14 interceptions, with three of the pickoffs returned for touchdowns. In his last game as a starter he threw six interceptions against the Dolphins in a 27–17 loss. The Raiders finished the season at 8–8. Hollas was 4–2 as a starter during the 1998 campaign.

He participated in training camp with the Detroit Lions in 1999.

== Post-football career ==
In 2000, his professional football career came to a conclusion and he entered the sports and education management arena. He served as an assistant coach with the Houston Marshals of the Spring Football League. He was the head football coach and associate athletic director at St. Thomas High School in Houston, Texas from May 2008 through January 2012. During his four-year tenure, the Eagles appeared in the playoffs three times, including a state semi-final appearance in the fall of 2011. Currently, he is employed in the oil, gas, and energy sector in Houston.
