= Alan Faneca =

American football player (born 1976)

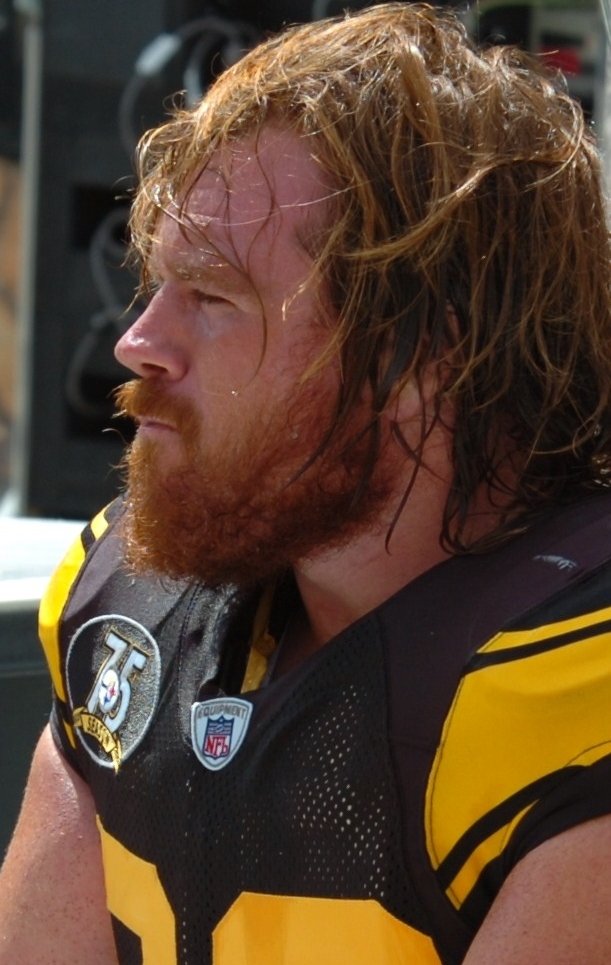
- Faneca with the Pittsburgh Steelers in 2007

No. 65, 66
- Position: Guard

Personal information
- Born: December 7, 1976 (age 49); New Orleans, Louisiana, U.S.
- Listed height: 6 ft 5 in (1.96 m)
- Listed weight: 316 lb (143 kg)

Career information
- High school: Lamar Consolidated (Rosenberg, Texas)
- College: LSU (1994–1997)
- NFL draft: 1998: 1st round, 26th overall pick

Career history
- Pittsburgh Steelers (1998–2007); New York Jets (2008–2009); Arizona Cardinals (2010)

Awards and highlights
- Super Bowl champion (XL); 6× First-team All-Pro (2001, 2002, 2004–2007); 2× Second-team All-Pro (2003, 2008); 9× Pro Bowl (2001–2009); NFL 2000s All-Decade Team; Pittsburgh Steelers All-Time Team; Pittsburgh Steelers Hall of Honor; Jacobs Blocking Trophy (1997); Consensus All-American (1997); 2× First-team All-SEC (1996, 1997)

Career NFL statistics
- Games played: 206
- Games started: 201
- Fumble recoveries: 11
- Stats at Pro Football Reference
- Pro Football Hall of Fame

Alan Joseph Faneca (/ˈfænɪkə/; born December 7, 1976) is an American former professional football player who was a guard in the National Football League (NFL) for 13 seasons. He played college football for Louisiana State University (LSU), and earned consensus All-America honors. He was selected by the Pittsburgh Steelers in the first round of the 1998 NFL draft, and played professionally for the Steelers, New York Jets and Arizona Cardinals of the NFL. A six-time first-team All-Pro and nine-time Pro Bowl selection, Faneca won a Super Bowl ring with the Steelers in Super Bowl XL, defeating the Seattle Seahawks. He was elected to the Pro Football Hall of Fame in 2021 and on May 10, 2021, he was introduced as the head football coach of Frank W. Cox High School in Virginia Beach, Virginia.

== Early life ==
Faneca attended John Curtis Christian School in River Ridge, Louisiana from 1987 to 1990. While attending John Curtis Christian he played football and basketball for the 27-time state champions while in middle and junior high school.

Faneca then attended Lamar Consolidated High School in Rosenberg, Texas, lettering in football and track. He was an All-Greater Houston, Orlando Sentinel All-South, and Touchdown Club of Houston player of the year.

Faneca began having seizures, which were later diagnosed as epilepsy, at age 15. He started on medication to control it and was able to continue playing football.

== College career ==
Faneca attended Louisiana State University, and played for the LSU Tigers football team from 1994 to 1997. As a freshman in 1994, he was redshirted. He was voted the Southeastern Conference freshman of the year by the Knoxville News Sentinel in 1995. In 1996, he was selected as a second-team All-American. As a junior in 1997, he was recognized as a consensus first-team All-American and was also one of three finalists for 1997 Outland Trophy.

In the 1997 home game against the Florida Gators, Faneca was called "a beast" for having repeatedly driven the Gators off the field and creating openings for the Tiger backs to charge through.

Faneca started his last 36 games at LSU and allowed only one sack in his final season. He had 210 pancake blocks in his college career. He returned to school in 1999 and earned a bachelor's degree in management entrepreneurship.

== Professional career ==
Pre-draft measurables
Height	Weight	Arm length	Hand span	40-yard dash	10-yard split	20-yard split	20-yard shuttle	Three-cone drill	Vertical jump	Broad jump	Bench press
6 ft 4 5/8 in (1.95 m)	322 lb (146 kg)	33 3/4 in (0.86 m)	10 1/4 in (0.26 m)	5.47 s	1.87 s	3.10 s	4.71 s	8.66 s	26.0 in (0.66 m)	7 ft 10 in (2.39 m)	20 reps
All values from NFL Combine

=== Pittsburgh Steelers ===
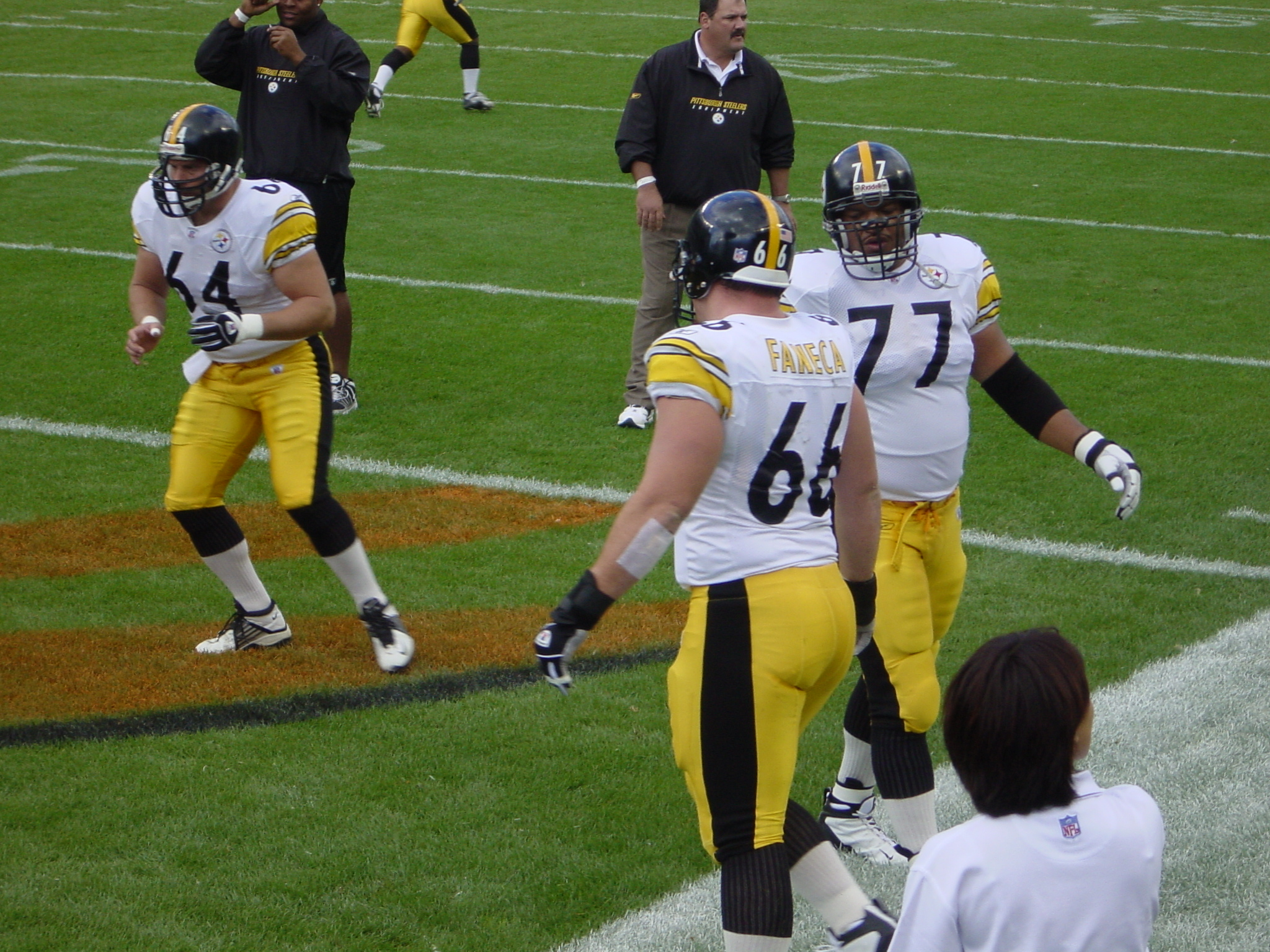
Faneca (66) in 2002

Faneca was selected by the Pittsburgh Steelers in the first round (26th overall) in the 1998 NFL draft. He saw limited playing time at first but injuries to fellow Steelers Will Wolford and Jim Sweeney allowed him to get his first start against the Cincinnati Bengals. He earned the Joe Greene Award as the team's top rookie. In 1999 against the Cleveland Browns he was having a bad season debut before leaving the game at halftime, after suffering a left ankle injury late in the second quarter of the game and played the rest of the first half after sustaining the injury but did not play during the second half. Against Baltimore Ravens he returned from his ankle injury but was replaced in the second half by Roger Duffy. One of his best games of the season was against the Cincinnati Bengals helping to pave the way for Jerome Bettis first 100-yard game of that season. Against the Carolina Panthers helped pave the way for Bettis season-high 137 yards rushing and the Steelers second-highest rushing performance of the season.

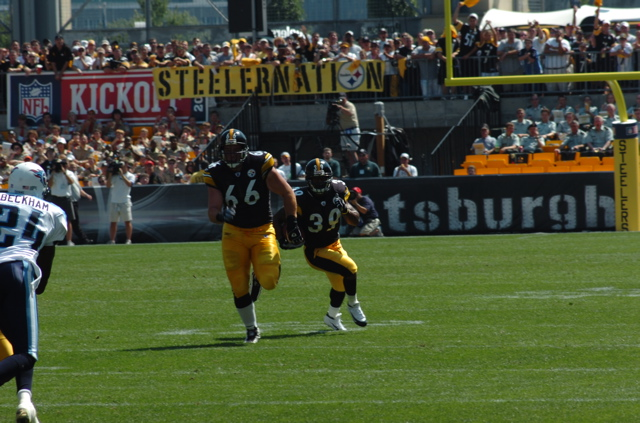
Faneca blocks for Willie Parker

In 2000, Faneca helped the Steelers rank fourth in the league in rushing, one of only 10 teams to compile more than 2,000 yards rushing in 2000. He had his best season to date when he was named a starter in the 2002 Pro Bowl his first selection to the squad, and also was named All-Pro by the Associated Press, The Sporting News, Sports Illustrated and Football Digest, and was named to Pro Football Weekly's-All-NFL team. He had an offseason surgery on his right wrist and missed some playing time during the teams preseason. In the 2002 season he was named to Pro Football Weekly's All-NFL and All-AFC team. Also selected to the USA Today Sports Weekly's All-Pro team was voted to his second consecutive Pro Bowl In 2003, he switched positions from left guard to left tackle due to injuries, helping teammate Amos Zereoué to three 100-yard performances during the season. He helped running backs Jerome Bettis, Duce Staley, and Willie Parker set individual and team rushing records, as well as propelling the Steelers to Super Bowl XL in Detroit, in which Pittsburgh defeated the Seattle Seahawks 21–10. He helped spring Parker to a 75-yard touchdown run that is currently the longest run in Super Bowl history. In the 2007 season he helped quarterback Ben Roethlisberger to a perfect passer rating of 158.3 and Najeh Davenport to 123 rushing yards in week 16 at St. Louis Rams. He led the way for Willie Parker's 105-yard rushing performance in week 10 against the Browns, and was the key to Steelers ground attack rolling for 205 yards in week 3 vs. San Francisco 49ers, as well as the 206-yard rushing effort in the season opener at Cleveland.

In 2007, Faneca was voted to the Steelers 75th Anniversary All Time Team by Steeler fans.

=== New York Jets ===
On March 1, 2008, the New York Jets signed Faneca to a five-year, $40 million contract, with $21 million in guarantees. The contract made Faneca the highest-paid offensive lineman in NFL history (a distinction quickly overtaken by rookie Jake Long). Faneca was expected to provide veteran leadership to a Jets offensive line that included three former first-round picks from 1999 and 2006, D'Brickashaw Ferguson, Nick Mangold and Damien Woody. Later that offseason, the Jets acquired Brett Favre via trade from Green Bay. Favre and Faneca have since been selected as Pro Football Hall of Famers, with Favre being inducted in 2016 and Faneca in 2021.

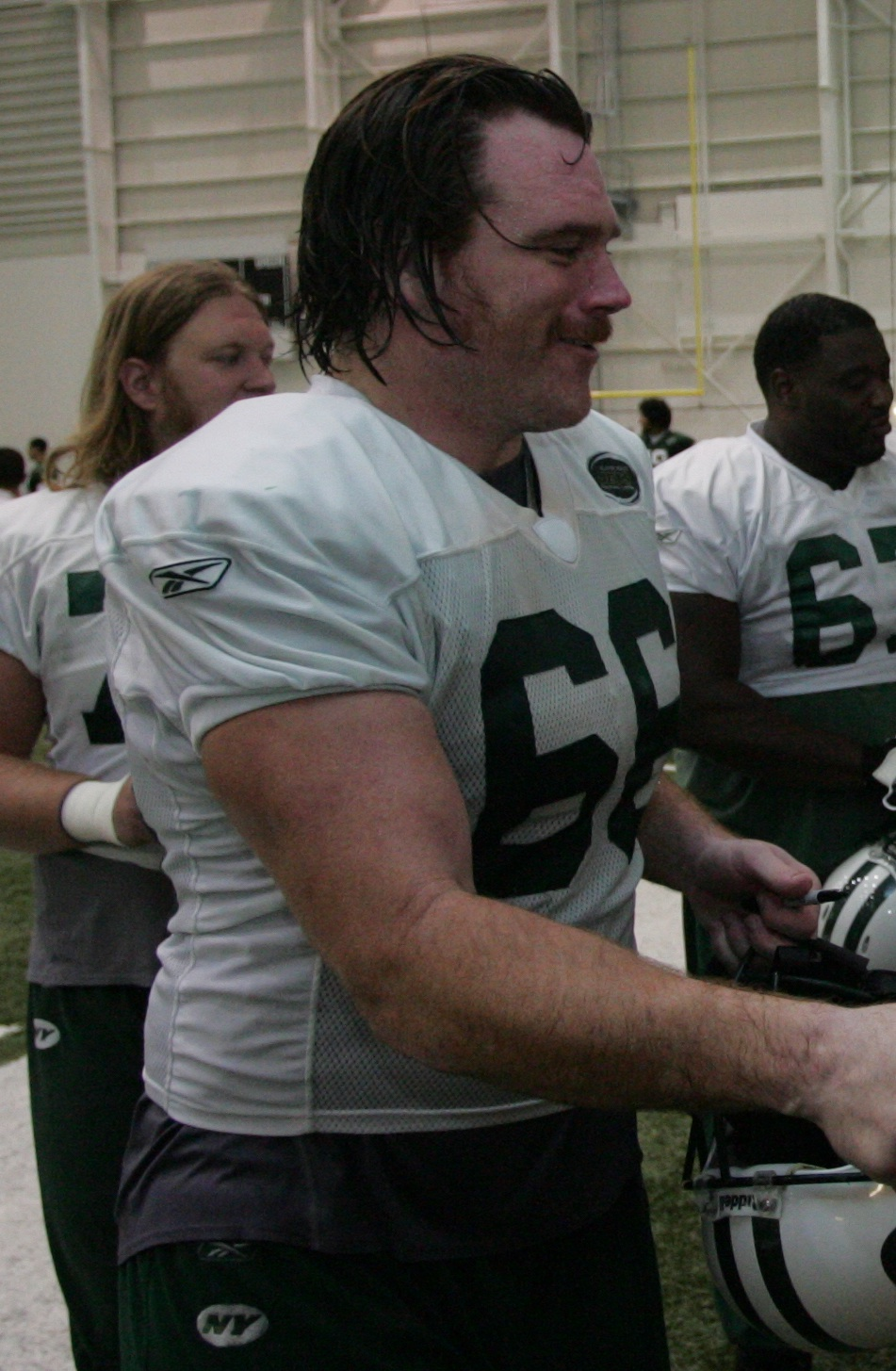
Faneca with the Jets in 2009.

Faneca rapidly made an impact on the Jets rushing attack, propelling it to 2006 yards and 20 touchdowns, and led the 4–12 Jets to a 9–7 record in 2008, good for third in the AFC East.

In 2009, Faneca anchored the Jets to 2756 yards and 21 touchdowns, again leading the Jets to a 9–7 record and securing a wild-card playoff berth. They proceeded to defeat the Cincinnati Bengals in a 24–14 victory in that wildcard game. In an AFC divisional playoff game, the Jets beat the favored San Diego Chargers 17–14 behind Shonn Greene's 128 rushing yards and a touchdown and Thomas Jones's 41 yards, totaling 169 yards on the ground. They surprised many observers by beating the Chargers and going to the AFC Championship game where they eventually succumbed to the Indianapolis Colts 30–17.

Faneca was cut from the Jets on April 24, 2010, after they selected Vladimir Ducasse in the second round of the 2010 NFL draft.

=== Arizona Cardinals ===
Faneca agreed to terms with the Arizona Cardinals on a one-year, $2.5 million deal, which included a $300,000 signing bonus and a $100,000 workout bonus, and reunited him with his former Steelers coach Ken Whisenhunt and offensive line coach Russ Grimm.

=== Retirement ===
Faneca retired on May 10, 2011, ending his distinguished career with nine Pro Bowl appearances, eight All-Pro selections, and a Super Bowl ring.

In recognition of the weight-related health issues experienced by many retired players, he has lost over 100 pounds since his retirement. In February 2014, Faneca successfully completed the New Orleans Rock 'n' Roll Marathon with a finish time of 3:56:17. On February 6, 2021, he was inducted into the Pro Football Hall of Fame.

== Personal life ==
Faneca married Julie Kuchta of Virginia Beach, whom he met as a freshman at LSU. They have three children. In 2021, he was named head coach of football at Frank W. Cox High School in Virginia Beach. Faneca stepped down as coach on 19 December 2022 after leading Cox High to a 16–8 record over two seasons. On May 7, 2026 he was introduced as Offensive Line Coach at St. Paul's School (Louisiana) where his son, Burton, is on the team.
