= Brian Zimmerman =

American politician

Brian Christopher Zimmerman (August 20, 1972 – September 20, 1996) was an American politician who in 1983, at the age of 11, was elected mayor of the community of Crabb, Texas. He won by a landslide, garnering 23 of the 30 votes cast. His stated goal as mayor was to incorporate the unincorporated community of approximately 200 people to avoid annexation by neighboring cities such as Houston.

His sole campaign promise led to a "hard fought" incorporation battle, because many residents feared that incorporation would result in higher taxes. However, Mayor Zimmerman held that an impending annexation would result in even higher taxes than incorporation, which instead would give the town some control over tax rates. The other major issue was that incorporation would force him out of his position as mayor, since Texas law stated that mayors of incorporated communities had to be at least 18 years of age.

He nonetheless supported a referendum to incorporate the community, stating "The mayor isn't there to sit and worry about keeping his job. He's there to do what's best for the people." Zimmerman's incorporation bid was ultimately unsuccessful, but he was reelected as mayor following the referendum. During his first two years in office, he reportedly had one of Crabb's roads paved. His unique mayorship garnered considerable attention - "worldwide" according to the Texas Almanac - that included articles in People magazine and The New York Times. In 1986, his story was chronicled in a made-for-television film called Lone Star Kid.

In 1996, Brian Zimmerman died of a heart attack in Houston at the age of 24. As of 2008, Crabb remains an unincorporated community and has been neither incorporated nor annexed during or after Zimmerman's life.
