= Henry Rosenberg =

Swiss-American businessman

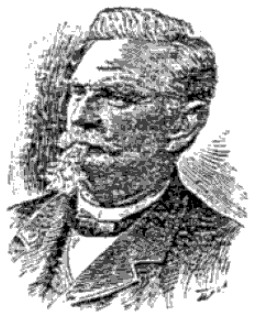
- Born: Henry von Rosenberg; June 22, 1824; Bilten, Switzerland
- Died: May 12, 1893 (aged 68); Galveston, Texas
- Occupation: Businessman

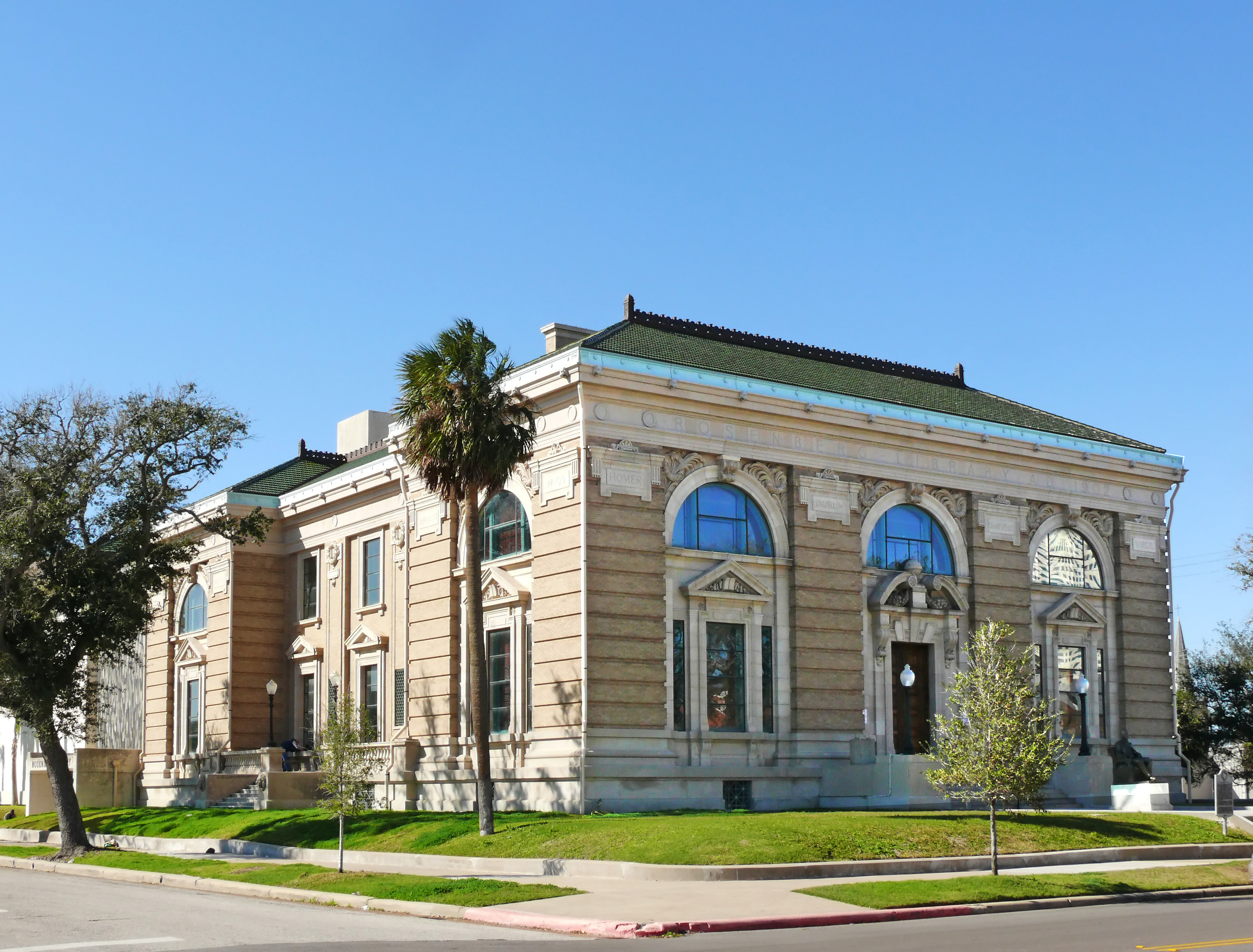
The Rosenberg Library. A gift from Henry Rosenberg to the City of Galveston.

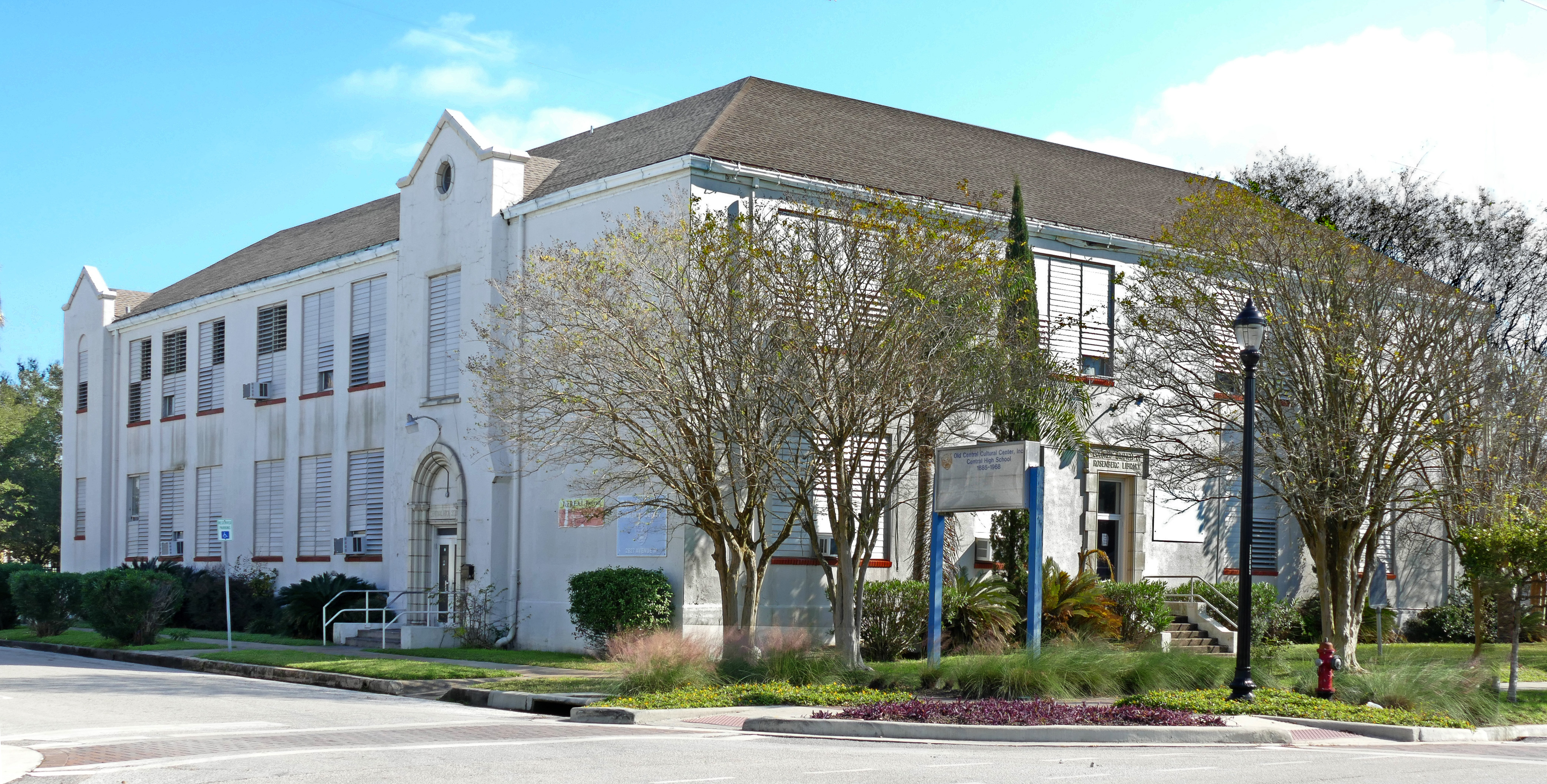
Rosenberg Library-Colored Branch. In addition to the main (at the time whites only) library, he bequeathed money for this "colored" library.

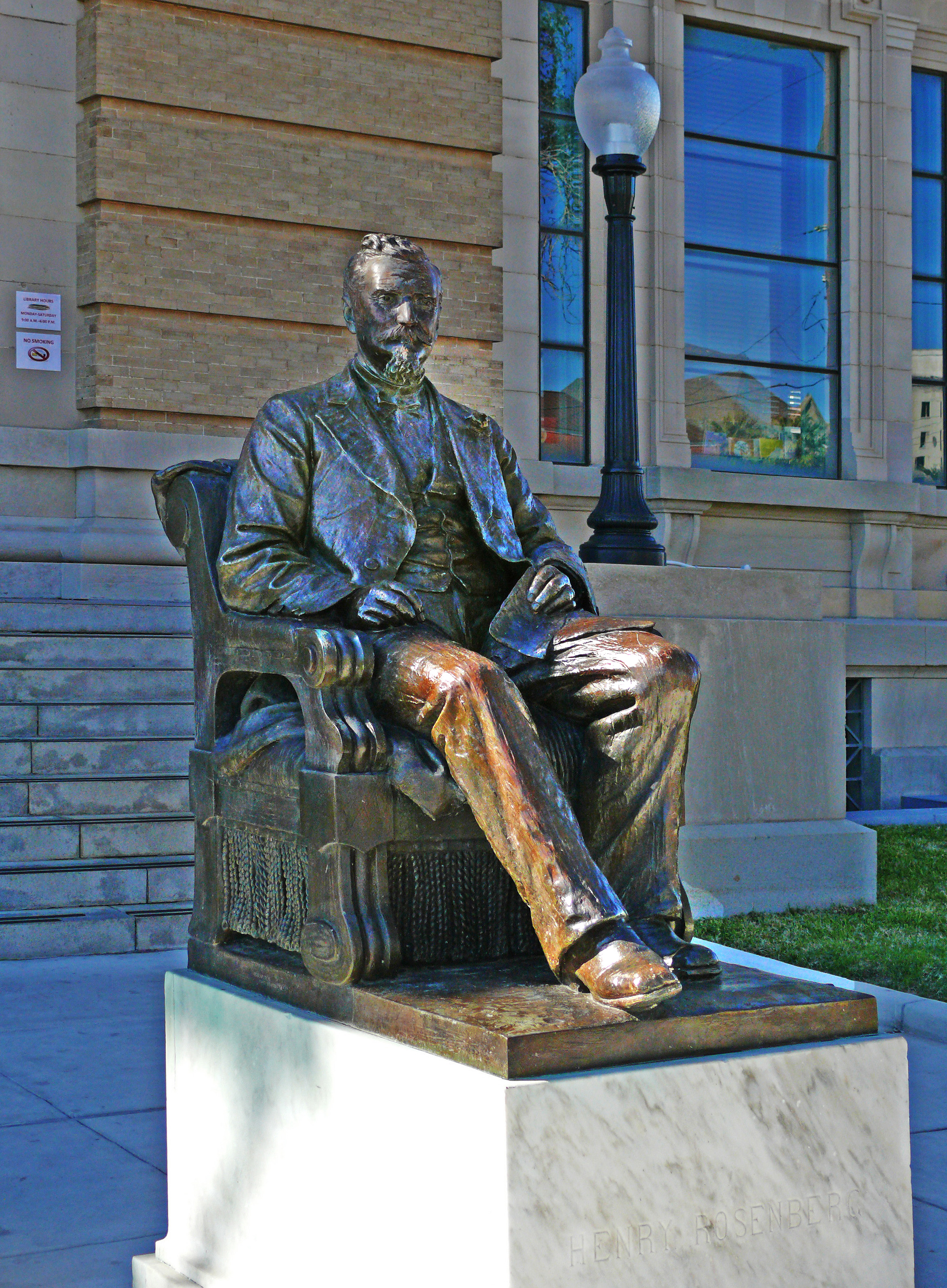
Statue of Henry Rosenberg in front of the Rosenberg Library

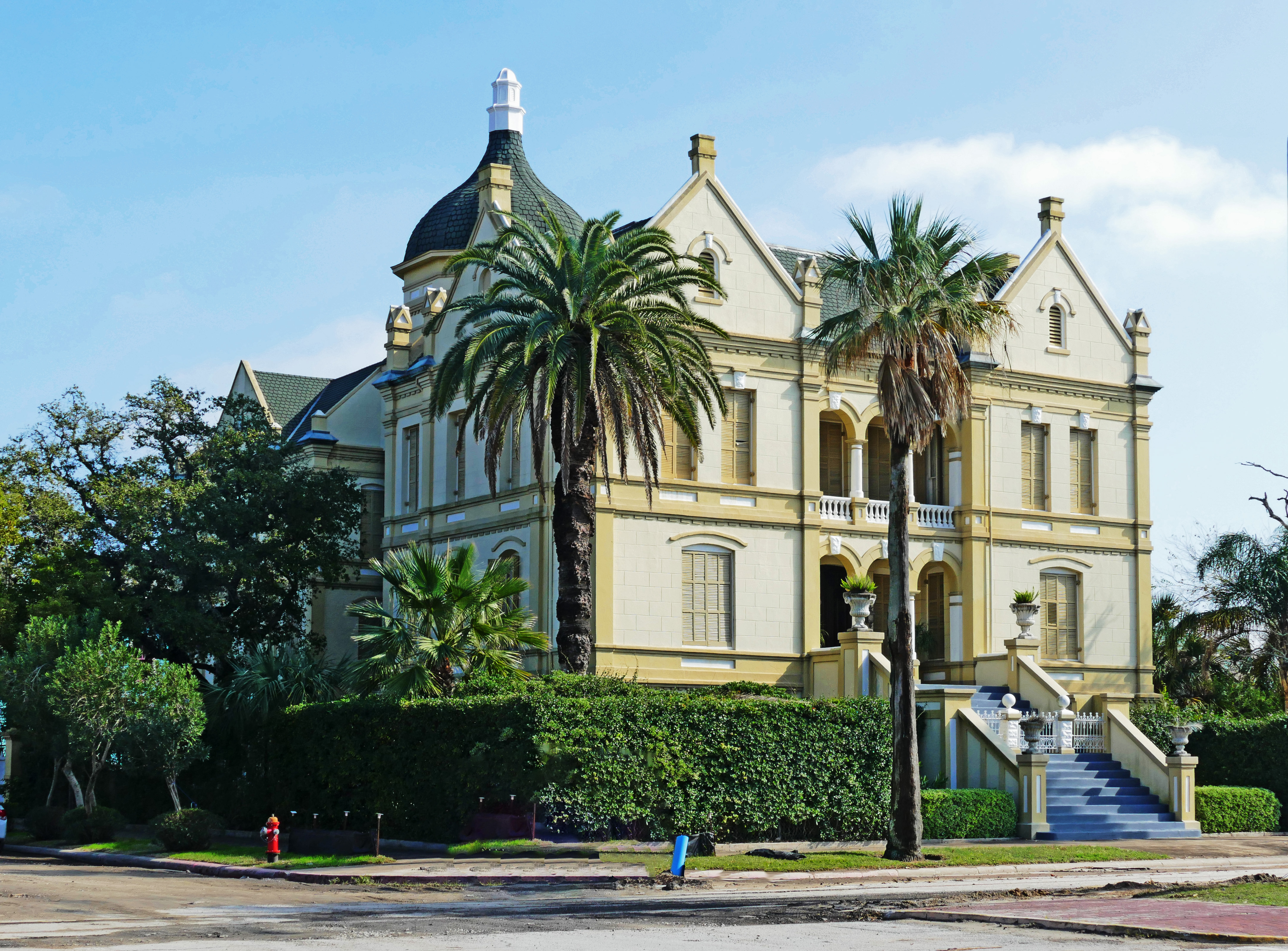
Letitia Rosenberg Home for Elderly Women. Another of his many gifts to Galveston, he named it in memory of his first wife.

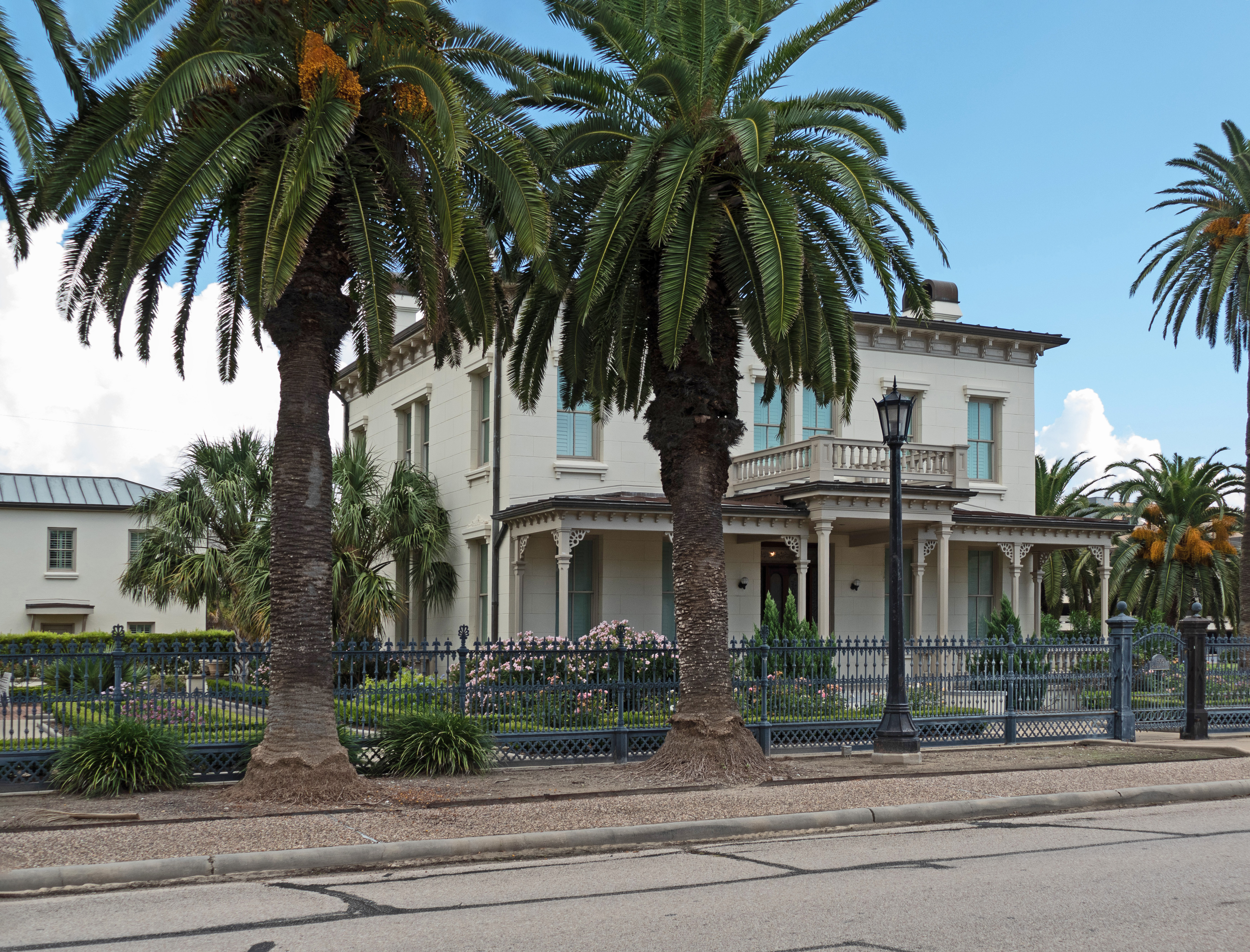
Henry Rosenberg's Home in Galveston

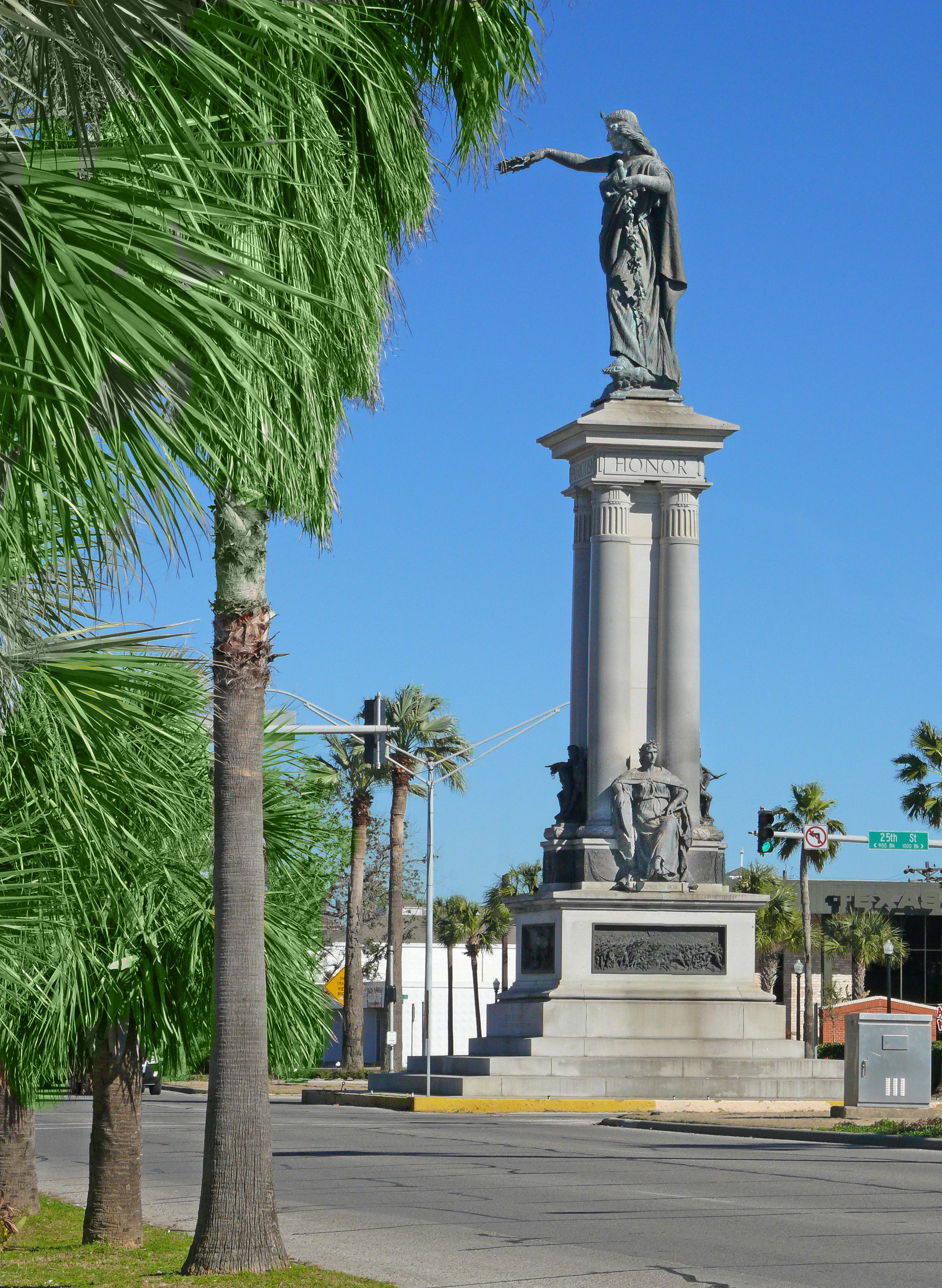
Texas Heroes Monument contributed by Rosenberg.

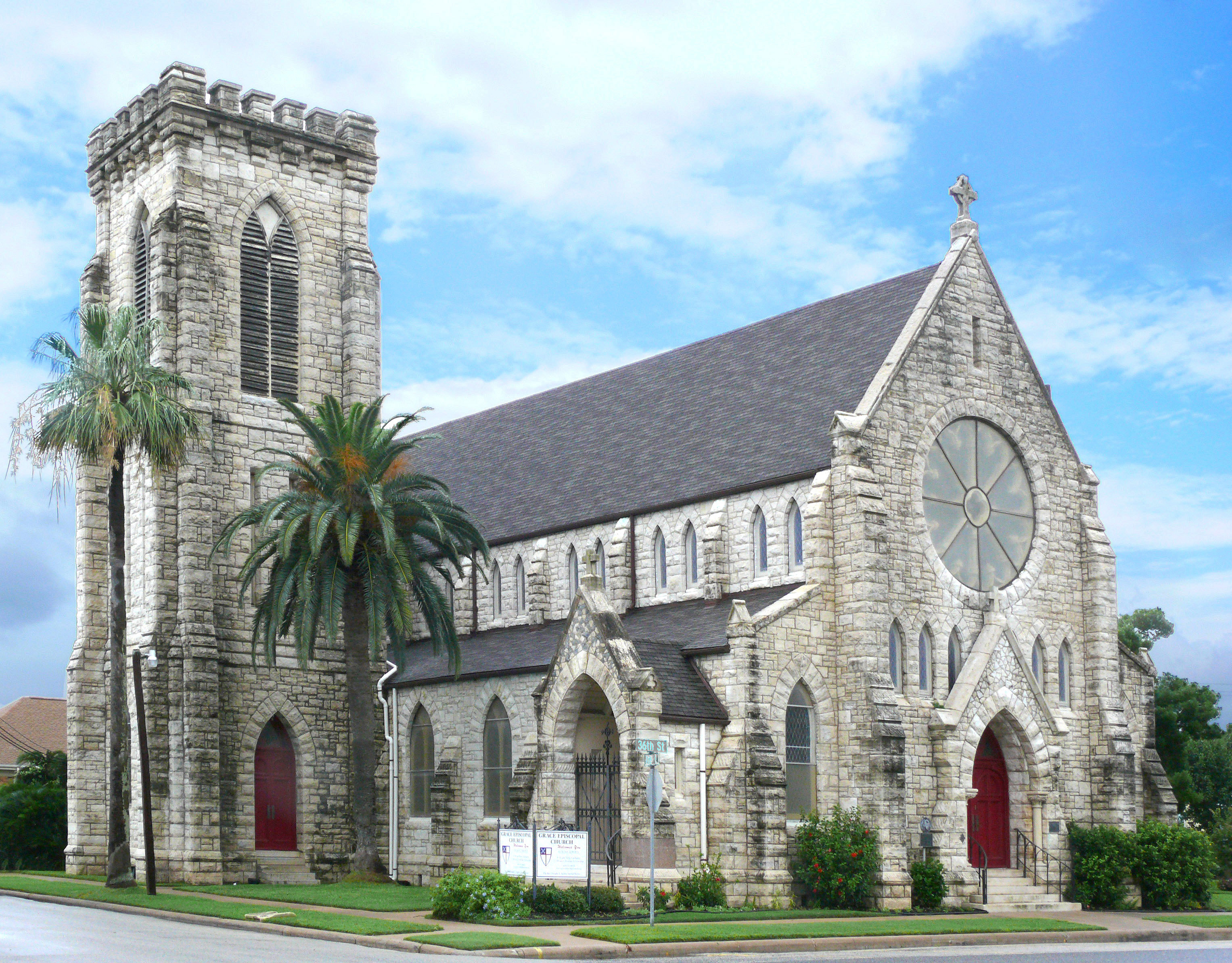
Grace Episcopal Church was another Henry Rosenberg's gifts to Galveston

Henry Rosenberg (born Henry von Rosenberg; 1824–1893) is the namesake of Rosenberg, Texas. He was born in Bilten, Switzerland, on June 22, 1824 and died in Galveston, Texas on May 12, 1893. As a business leader and philanthropist, he founded or led several important businesses in the Galveston area. He had no children and left more than $600,000 (more than $21 million in 2024) to create a free public library in Galveston, Texas.

== Source of name for Rosenberg, Texas ==
The City of Rosenberg is located at the site of a junction of two rail lines, named Rosenberg Junction (named after Mr. Rosenberg). Rosenberg was involved in the building of one of the major rail lines. in his role as president of the Gulf, Colorado and Santa Fe Railway. Rosenberg was the first president of the company.
