= Elizabeth Powell (colonist) =

Texas colonist

Elizabeth Powell was a Texas colonist and boarding house operator.

== Biography ==
Powell received a land grant for a league of land (4428 acres) from the Mexican government in present day Powell Point, Fort Bend County, Texas, on the waters of the San Bernard River and Turkey Creek. Powell operated a boarding house and bar that was a popular stop considering there were not many establishments in early Texas.

Santa Anna's troops camped at Elizabeth Powell's boarding house before and after the Battle of San Jacinto. She had not fled with the Runaway Scrape and was there on April 10, 1836 and to witness the arrival of Urrea's army on April 20, the event is documented in the journals of the soldiers who camped there. On April 24, she was forced to house the generals, as they planned the Mexican army's retreat. On April 26, they set fire to her house and outbuildings as the army departed.

== The Elizabeth Powell Homestead ==
Literary evidence suggests only a general location of the Powell house and an archaeological team conducted field work in the area in 1999 and 2000, with mapping and addition field work completed in 2004 and 2005.

== Children ==
- Her son, Samuel Graves Powell, was a famous steamboat captain that operated on his ship, the Betty Powell, up and down the Brazos River. The ship was named for his wife, Elizabeth Sheppard, whom he married in Matagorda County.
- Her daughter of the same name, nee Elizabeth Powell, married Leman Kelcy.
- Her daughter, Julia, married Isaac McGary (and later divorced him), who fought in the Battle of San Jacinto.

== Bibliography ==
- Aucoin, Elizabeth K.; Castro, Pablo R.; Kindall, Sheldon M.; Shelby, Robert T. (April 2007). "The Elizabeth Powell Site (41FB269), Fort Bend County, Texas" (PDF). Houston Archeological Society.
- Moore, Stephen L. (2004). Eighteen Minutes: The Battle of San Jacinto and the Texas Independence Campaign. Rowman & Littlefield. ISBN 978-1-58907-009-7.
