= Crabb, Texas =

- Unincorporated community
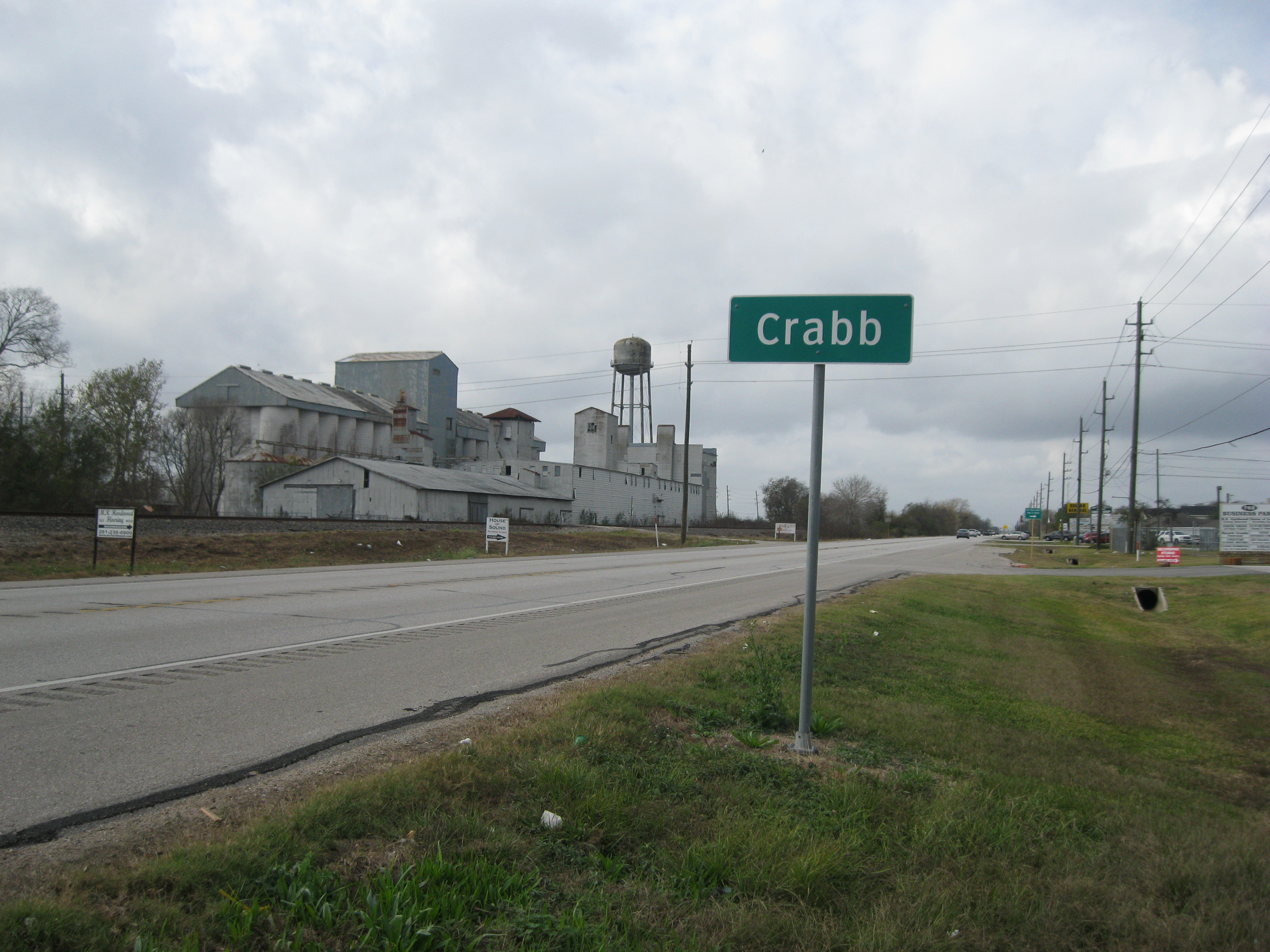
- Crabb road sign on FM 762 looking west with disused grain elevator on left and businesses on the right

- Location within Texas Location within the United States
- Coordinates: 29°32′18″N 95°42′36″W
- Country: United States
- State: Texas
- County: Fort Bend
- Elevation: 85 ft (26 m)
- Time zone: UTC-6 (Central (CST))
  - Summer (DST): UTC-5 (CDT)
- ZIP code: 77469
- Area code: 281

Crabb is a small unincorporated community in Fort Bend County, Texas, United States. According to the Handbook of Texas, the community had a population of 125 in 2000. It is located in the Greater Houston metro area.

== History ==
Old Three Hundred colonists Abner and Joseph Kuykendall were granted ownership of the land around Crabb. Joseph died sometime in the 1870s and his widow Eliza Jane married John C. Crabb. When the Gulf, Colorado and Santa Fe Railway laid track through the area in 1879, Eliza Jane Crabb was the owner of the property and was operated as a right of way. Hence, the community was named Crabb or Crabb Switch. In 1894, the settlement was served by a post office. By 1896, 400 people were living in the community, which had a cotton gin, two doctors, two orchards, and a Methodist church. The post office was closed in 1900. The population shrank in size until it fell to 100 in 1933. Three years later there were two churches, one business, and a few houses in Crabb. The number of inhabitants shrank to 50 in 1953 and to 40 from the 1960s to the 1980s. In the late 1980s, the population increased to 125 and remained steady through 2000.

The town was made notable when an 11-year-old named Brian Zimmerman won an unofficial election for mayor in 1983. He worked to incorporate the small town, which had a population of under 200 when he was elected. This threatened his mayorship because of Texas state law prohibiting minors from serving as mayor. His story was made into a movie called Lone Star Kid. While his bid lost, he was reelected mayor again after the referendum.

== Geography ==
Crabb is located on Farm to Market Road 762 below the Brazos River bend, 5 mi (8.0 km) southeast of Richmond in Fort Bend County.

== Education ==
Crabb had its own school in 1896. A separate school for black children opened the following year.

Crabb is zoned to schools in the Lamar Consolidated Independent School District.

Zoned schools include:

- Williams Elementary School (North of FM 762)
- Polly Ryon Middle School
- Antoinette Reading Junior High
- George Ranch High School

Former zoning

- Navarro Middle School
- B.F. Terry High School

== Gallery ==
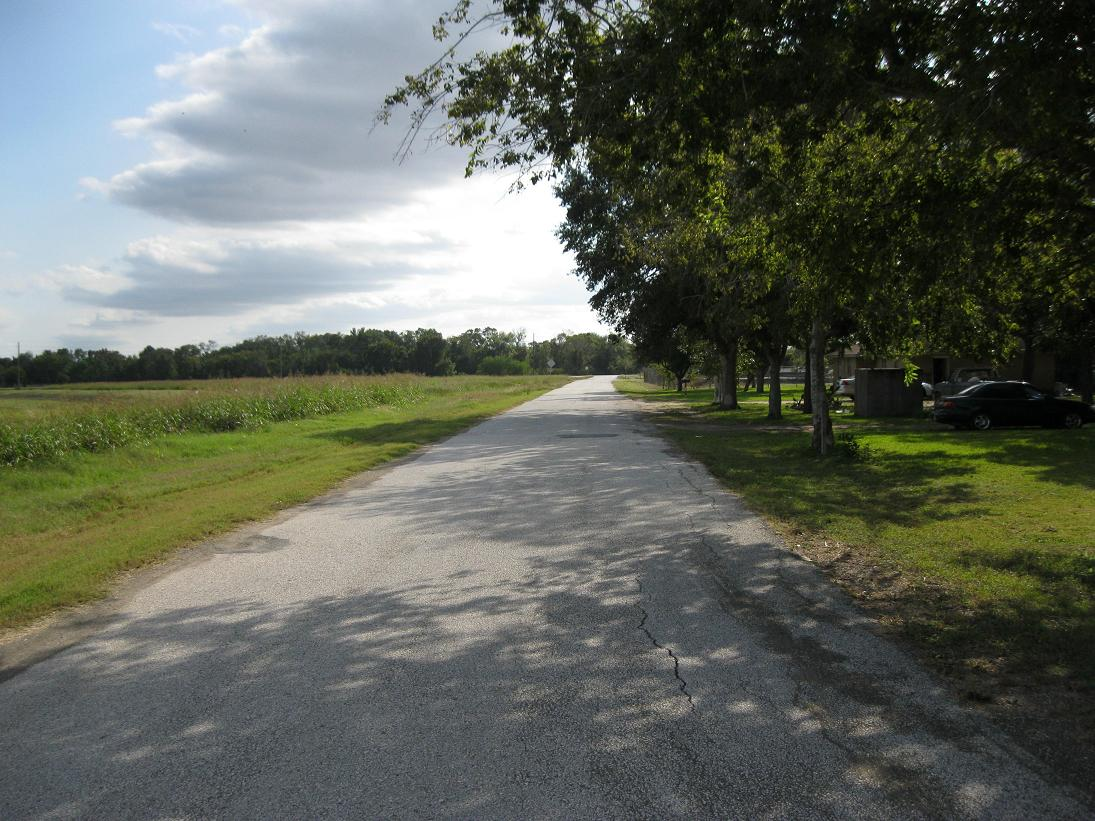
Looking south to FM 762 on Payne Lane

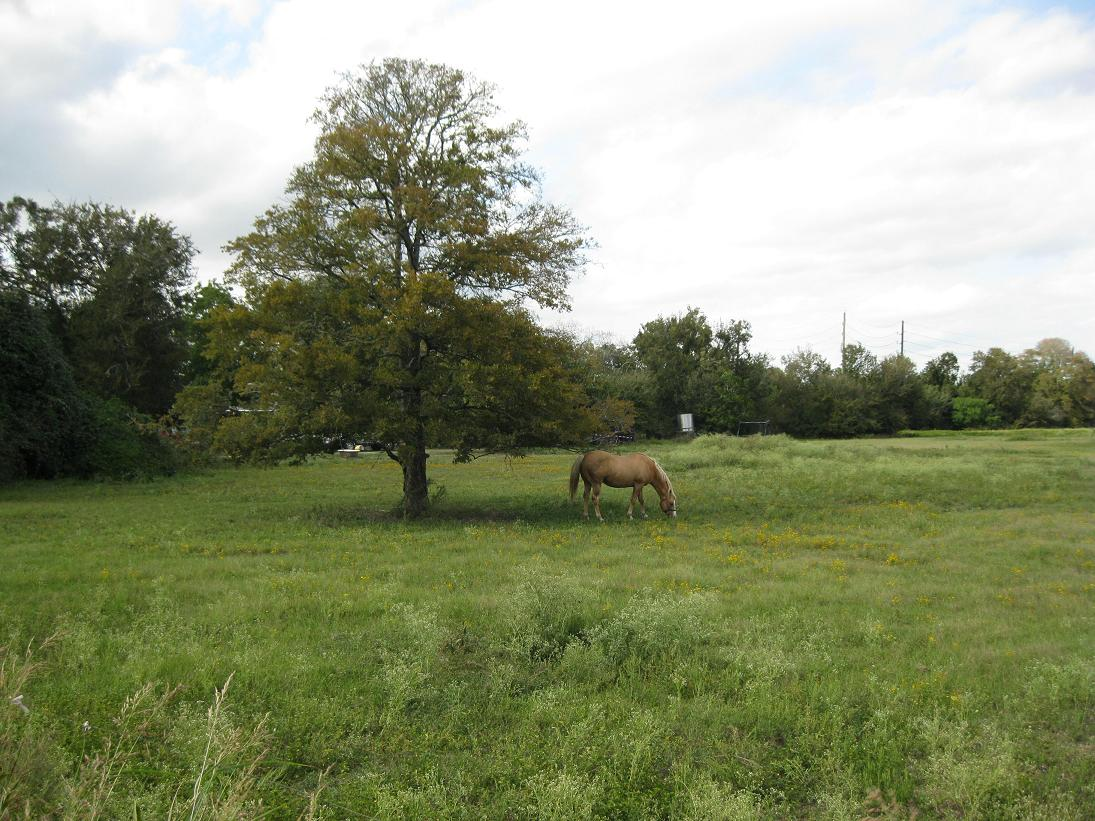
Horse in a field near Payne Lane

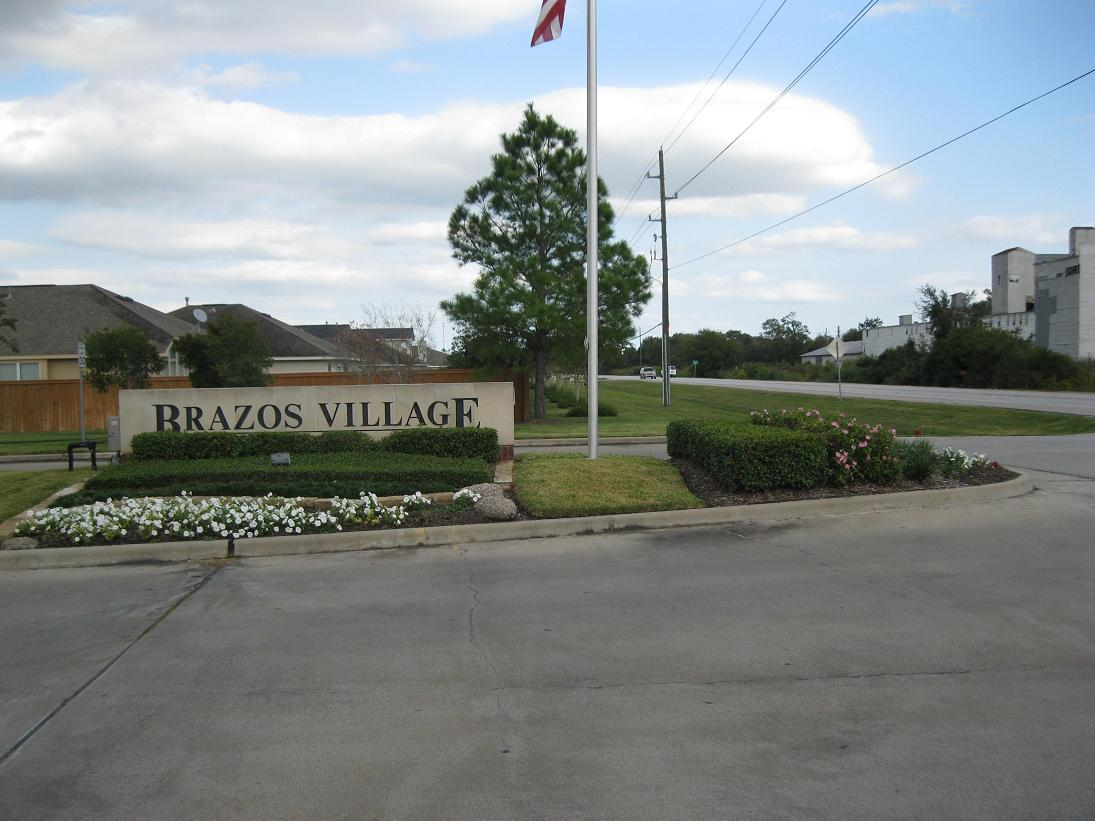
View east at Brazos Village subdivision

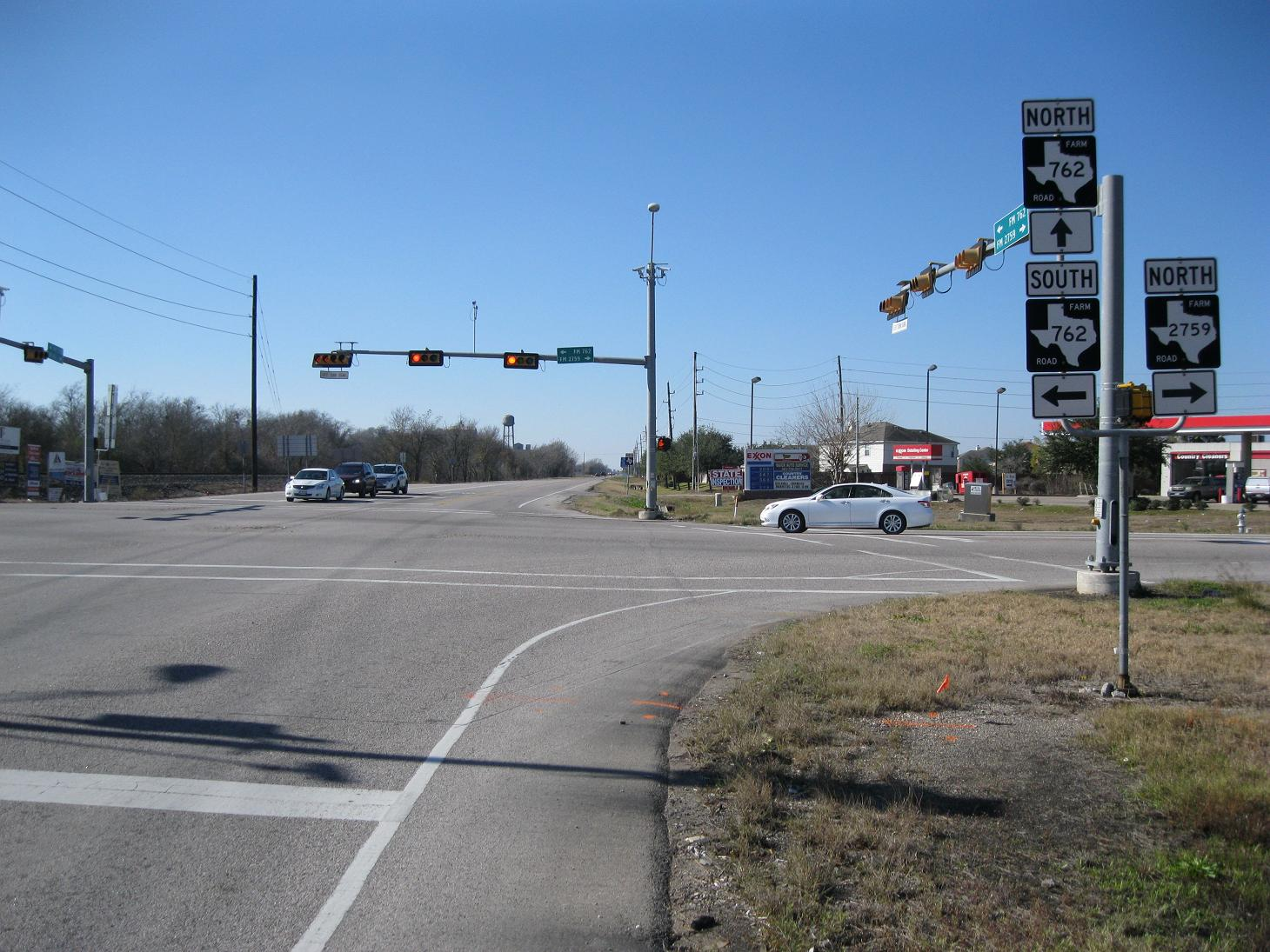
View northwest at FM 762 and Crabb River Rd

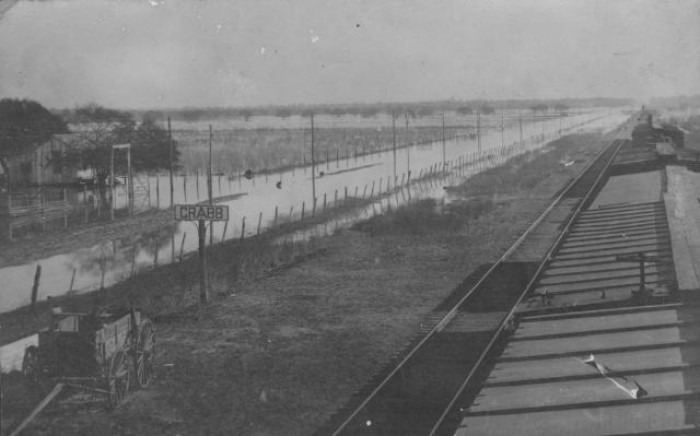
Photo of 1913 flood at Crabb Switch
