= Randal Grichuk =

American baseball player (born 1991)

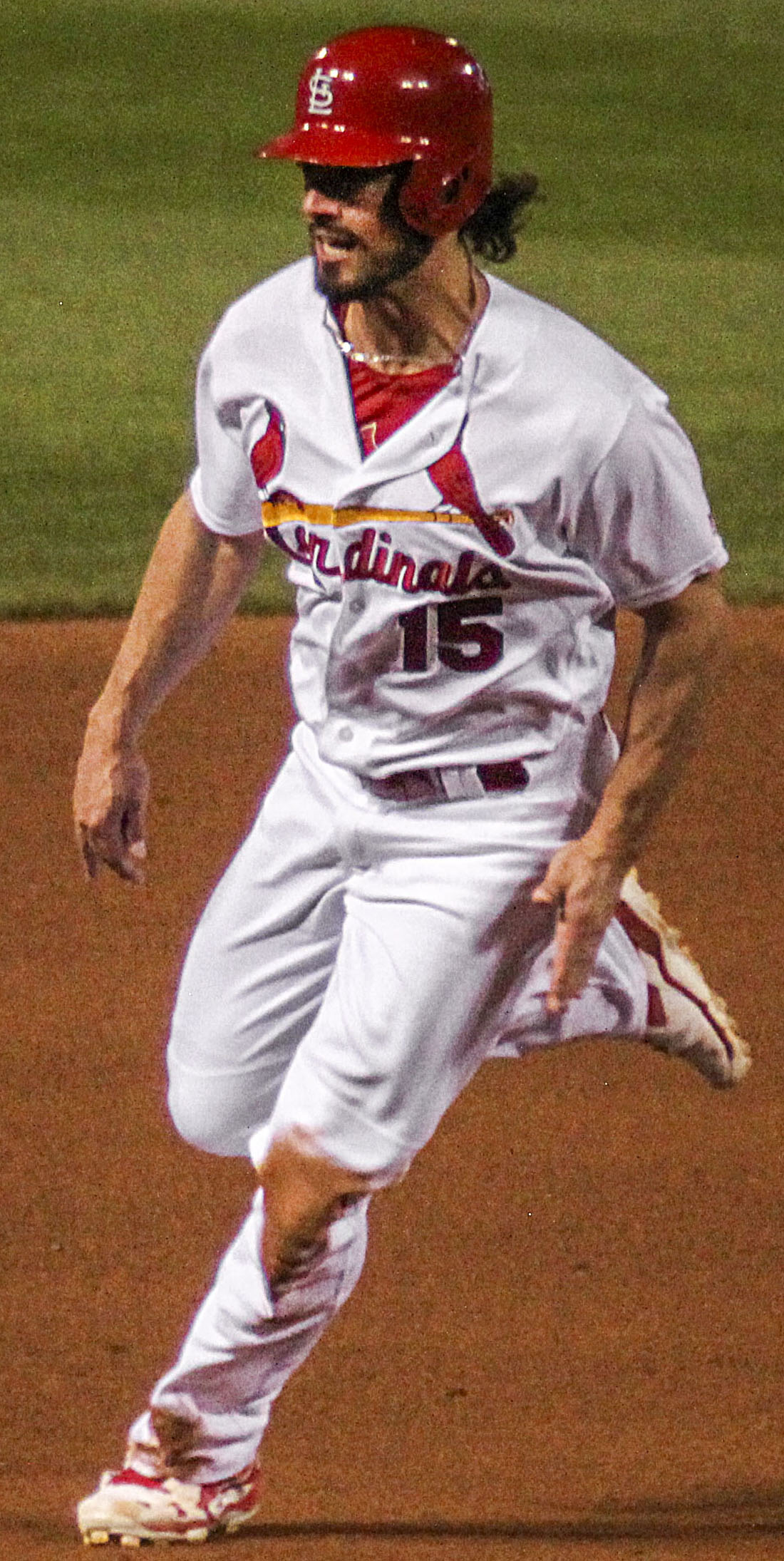
- Grichuk with the St. Louis Cardinals in 2016

Free agent
- Outfielder
- Born: August 13, 1991 (age 35); Rosenberg, Texas, U.S.
- Bats: Right Throws: Right

MLB debut
- April 28, 2014, for the St. Louis Cardinals

MLB statistics (through 2026 season)
- Batting average: .253
- Home runs: 227
- Runs batted in: 675
- Stats at Baseball Reference

Teams
- St. Louis Cardinals (2014–2017); Toronto Blue Jays (2018–2021); Colorado Rockies (2022–2023); Los Angeles Angels (2023); Arizona Diamondbacks (2024–2025); Kansas City Royals (2025); New York Yankees (2026); Chicago White Sox (2026)

Randal Alexander Grichuk (born August 13, 1991) is an American professional baseball outfielder who is a free agent. He has played in Major League Baseball (MLB) for the St. Louis Cardinals, Toronto Blue Jays, Colorado Rockies, Los Angeles Angels, Arizona Diamondbacks, Kansas City Royals, New York Yankees, and Chicago White Sox.

Grichuk was selected by the Los Angeles Angels of Anaheim in the first round of the 2009 MLB draft from Lamar Consolidated High School in Rosenberg, Texas. The Angels traded him to the St. Louis Cardinals in November 2013, and he made his MLB debut with the Cardinals in 2014.

== Early life and amateur career ==
In 2003 and 2004, Grichuk participated in the Little League World Series for Lamar National of Richmond, Texas. He was featured in Sports Illustrated's "Faces in the Crowd" section in July 2005.

Grichuk attended Lamar Consolidated High School in Rosenberg, Texas. In 2008, as a Lamar Consolidated Baseball player, he was a First Team All-State OF and the All-Houston Area Most Valuable Player (MVP). That season, Grichuk batted .435 with 18 home runs and 45 RBI, leading the Mustangs to a school record 29 wins and a Regional Final appearance. In 2009, he was the 24-4A District MVP, Fort Bend Area MVP, 2009 1st Team All State OF, and 2009 1st Team All-American (EA Sports and Baseball America). In 28 games he hit .613 with 21 home runs, 46 hits, 46 RBI and 47 runs before Lamar was defeated in the third round of the playoffs.

Grichuk is of Czechoslovak and Russian descent.

== Professional career ==
=== Draft and minor leagues (2009–14) ===
Grichuk committed to attend the University of Arizona. The Los Angeles Angels of Anaheim drafted Grichuk in the first round, with the 24th overall selection, in the 2009 MLB draft, one selection ahead of Mike Trout. Grichuk signed with the Angels, rather than attend college.

A series of three unusual injuries delayed the outfield prospect's development. First, he tore a ligament after just 12 games in 2010. Second, he batted a foul ball that fractured his knee cap. Finally, while diving for a ball, he broke his wrist. In 2012, his first full season, Grichuk played 135 games and batted .298 with 18 home runs and 71 runs batted in with the Single-A Inland Empire 66ers. After a promotion to the Double-A Arkansas Travelers in 2013, he made 128 appearances, batting .256 with 22 home runs and 64 RBI. In October 2013, Rawlings and MiLB announced Grichuk was the recipient of the Minor League Gold Glove Award for right field.

MLB.com ranked Grichuk as the Angels' No. 4 prospect after the 2013 season, and the club added him to their 40-man roster on November 20, 2013. Two days later, they traded him along with Peter Bourjos to the St. Louis Cardinals for David Freese and Fernando Salas. Grichuk began the 2014 season with the Memphis Redbirds of the Triple-A Pacific Coast League.

=== St. Louis Cardinals (2014–2017) ===
==== 2014−15 ====
The Cardinals promoted Grichuk to the majors for the first time on April 28, 2014, after he had slashed .310/.359/.529 with six walks and 17 strikeouts. He debuted as a defensive replacement in the outfield that day. Grichuk made his first major league start in center field the next day, collecting a single in five at-bats for his first major league hit. The Cardinals optioned him back to Memphis shortly thereafter. Shortly afterwards, the Cardinals recalled him to the big leagues on May 30. He improved his Triple-A numbers, slashing .315/.363/.589 with ten home runs. Grichuk received the Cardinals' minor league system Player of the Month Award for May 2014. On June 7, he hit his first major league home run off Toronto Blue Jays' starter Mark Buehrle in a 5–0 victory.

Grichuk produced a .911 on-base plus slugging percentage (OPS) in 44 spring training at bats in 2015 and made the major league club as a fifth outfielder. While lifting weights, he strained his lower back, halting his play on April 16 and prompting the Cardinals to place him on the 15-day DL. On May 16, the Cardinals activated him from the disabled list. After striking out five times on May 18, he followed up with two doubles and a triple the next night against the New York Mets, as the Cardinals prevailed 10–2.

When Matt Holliday went on the DL in early June, that opened Grichuk's first legitimate opportunity for regular playing time in the major leagues, including all three outfield positions. From June 19–20 against the Philadelphia Phillies, he forged consecutive three-hit games, including hitting a home run in the first game, then two in the second. On June 30, he was a double short of hitting for the cycle in a 2–1 loss to the Chicago White Sox. His home run off Chris Sale traveled 448 feet (137 m), however, and landed in the Big Mac Land section of Busch Stadium. Through that point in the season, it was the longest home run of the year there by a Cardinals player.

Setting a new career high with six runs batted in on July 18, Grichuk also homered twice in a 12–2 win over the Mets. On August 5 against the Cincinnati Reds, he doubled in the sixth inning and hit the game-winning home run in the top of the 13th at Great American Ball Park in a 4–3 game. After straining his right elbow, the Cardinals placed Grichuk on the disabled list on August 17. The Cardinals reactivated him less than one month later. On September 10, he played center field against the Chicago Cubs, but was not permitted to throw as his elbow had still not fully recovered. After the season, he underwent surgery to repair a sports hernia.

==== 2016−17 ====
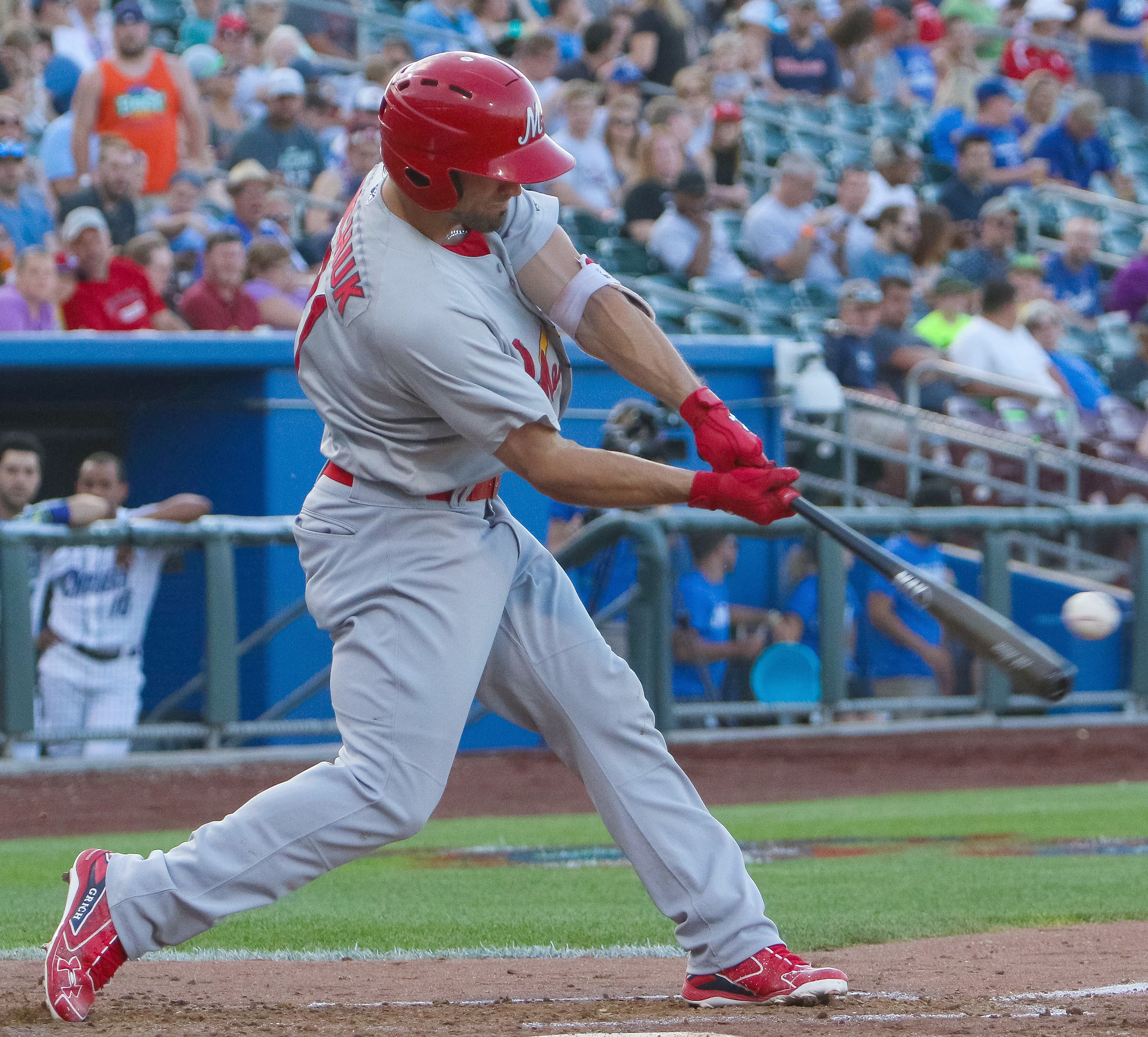
Grichuk batting for the Memphis Redbirds in 2016

Out of spring training in 2016, Grichuk won the role as starting center fielder. He hit his first career walk-off home run on May 23 in a 4–3 win against the Cubs. With his overall offensive output in decline from the previous year, the Cardinals optioned him to, and recalled him from, Memphis on multiple occasions in 2016. On August 13, 2016 − his 25th birthday − Grichuk hit his first career grand slam, providing the margin in an 8−4 win over the Cubs, and ending their 11-game win streak. He produced the game-winning RBI double on August 19 against Philadelphia Phillies in the 11th inning of a 4−3 win. Grichuk ended 2016 with a .240 batting average along with 24 home runs and 48 RBIs.

On April 2, 2017, Opening Night versus the defending World Series champion Chicago Cubs at Busch Stadium, Grichuk homered and hit a walk-off bases-loaded single in the bottom of the ninth.

=== Toronto Blue Jays ===
On January 19, 2018, the Cardinals traded Grichuk to the Toronto Blue Jays in exchange for pitchers Dominic Leone and Conner Greene. He began the season as Toronto's starting right fielder. On March 30, Grichuk hit his first home run as a Blue Jay, which came on the first pitch he saw from Masahiro Tanaka in the second inning of a 4–2 loss to the New York Yankees. After batting only .106 with two home runs and seven RBIs in 25 games, he was placed on the disabled list with a right knee strain on April 30. He was activated on June 1. Grichuk finished the season batting .245/.301/.502 and tied for first on the team in home runs with Justin Smoak with 25.

On April 2, 2019, Grichuk and the Blue Jays agreed to a five-year contract extension worth $52 million. In 2019, he batted .232/.280/.457 and led the team in both home runs (31) and runs batted in (80).

With the 2020 Blue Jays, Grichuk batted .273 with 12 home runs and 35 RBIs in 55 games.

=== Colorado Rockies ===
On March 24, 2022, Grichuk was traded to the Colorado Rockies for Raimel Tapia and Adrian Pinto.

In 2022 he had the lowest walk-to-strikeout ratio in the NL (0.19), the lowest line drive percentage of all qualified major league batters (12.9%), and batted .259/.299/.425. On the 2023 season, Grichuk's offensive production dipped despite hitting .308 in 64 games before being traded.

=== Los Angeles Angels ===
On July 30, 2023, Grichuk and C. J. Cron were traded to the Los Angeles Angels for minor league pitchers Jake Madden and Mason Albright. Grichuk was placed on waivers by the Angels on August 29, but was not claimed and remained with the club. On September 6, Grichuk was again placed on waivers by the Angels.

=== Arizona Diamondbacks ===
On February 17, 2024, Grichuk signed a one-year, $2 million contract with the Arizona Diamondbacks. In 106 appearances for the Diamondbacks, he slashed .291/.348/.528 with 12 home runs and 46 RBI. Grichuk declined his share of a mutual option for the 2025 season on October 31, and became a free agent.

On February 4, 2025, Grichuk re-signed with the Diamondbacks on a one-year, $5 million contract with a mutual option for 2026.

=== Kansas City Royals ===
On July 26, 2025, the Diamondbacks traded Grichuk to the Kansas City Royals for pitcher Andrew Hoffmann. He made 43 appearances for Kansas City, batting .206/.267/.299 with two home runs and five RBI. Grichuk declined his mutual option with the Royals on November 3, and became a free agent.

=== New York Yankees ===
On February 25, 2026, Grichuk signed a minor league contract with the New York Yankees. On March 21, it was announced that Grichuk made the Yankees' Opening Day roster. He made 16 appearances for the team, batting .194/.212/.323 with two RBI. Grichuk was designated for assignment by the Yankees on April 29. He elected free agency after clearing waivers on May 1.

=== Chicago White Sox ===
On May 4, 2026, Grichuk signed a major league contract with the Chicago White Sox.

== Awards and accomplishments ==
- Baseball America All-Rookie Team Outfielder (2015)
- Cardinals Minor League system Player of the Month (May 2014)
- Rawlings Minor League Baseball Gold Glove Award, right field (2013)
- Topps All-Star Rookie at outfield (2015)

== Player profile ==
Randal Grichuk's scouting report highlighted his potential as a power hitter. It was noted that his bat speed and pitch recognition distinguished him. However, it was noted that his yields lower-than-average walk rates but with a strikeout rate of less than 20 percent and causes him to miss easy pitches.

According to Baseball America's Kary Booher, Grichuk possesses an athletic frame with average arm and enough range to profile into an outfield corner slot. Through 2013, he has shown a low walk rate but has enough balance and bat control to bat .260 or higher in the major leagues.

Grichuk drew widespread attention for his raw power and bat speed in 2015. As of August 11, 2015, the average exit velocity of all his batted balls on the season was seventh in the major leagues at 93.17 miles per hour (149.94 km/h). The average for all fly balls and line drives only was fourth at 97.79 miles per hour (157.38 km/h).

Originally projected to be a first baseman, Grichuk expanded his versatility to the outfield thanks in part to his sleek and proportioned athletic frame. For what he lacks in the classic speed of center fielders, he mitigates with jumps, route running and positioning to anticipate the trajectory of balls hit to the outfield. His arm strength and range allow him the ability to cut off runners at an above average clip.

== See also ==
- St. Louis Cardinals all-time roster
