= B. F. Terry High School =

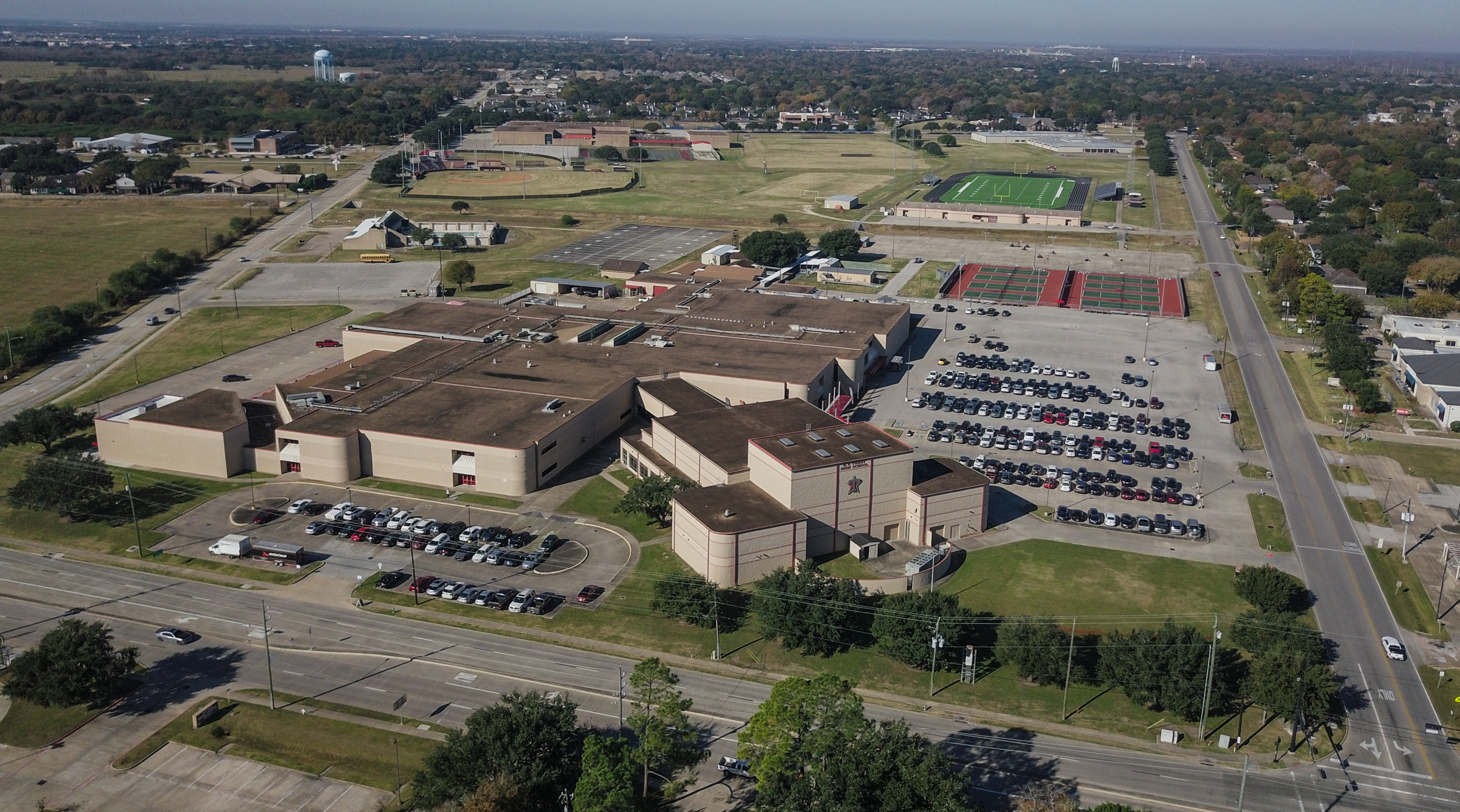

Location
- 5500 Avenue N Rosenberg, Texas 77471; United States; 29°32′40″N 95°46′23″W

Information
- Type: Public high school
- Motto: Ranger Pride Everyday, Every Way Never give up, never surrender
- School district: Lamar Consolidated Independent School District
- NCES District ID: 48265800
- Superintendent: Roosevelt Nivens
- CEEB code: 445997
- NCES School ID: 482658005534
- Principal: Brian K. Roberson
- Faculty: 85.62 (FTE)
- Grades: 9–12
- Gender: Coeducational
- Enrollment: 1,537 (2023–2024)
- Student to teacher ratio: 17.95
- Campus type: Suburb
- Colors: Red and gray
- Mascot: Rowdy The Ranger
- Nickname: Rangers
- Website: terryhs.lcisd.org

B. F. Terry High School is located in Rosenberg, Texas, United States, and is part of the Lamar Consolidated Independent School District.

Terry serves parts of Rosenberg, and all of Beasley, Kendleton and Powell Point. It formerly served the communities of Booth, Crabb and Pleak.

It is named for Benjamin Franklin Terry, a sugar planter and Confederate officer who organized and first commanded the 8th Texas Cavalry, known as Terry's Texas Rangers.

== Feeder schools ==
Lamar CISD calls this feeder system the "Red Track." Feeder junior high and middle schools share the THS colors and mascot.

=== Junior high school ===
- George Junior High School

=== Middle school ===
- Navarro Middle School

=== Elementary schools ===
- Bowie Elementary School
- Beasley Elementary School
- Meyer Elementary School
- Taylor Ray Elementary School
- Thomas Elementary School
- Travis Elementary School
- Manford Williams Elementary School

Travis, Meyer, Bowie, and Taylor Ray elementary schools are entirely zoned to B.F. Terry High School.

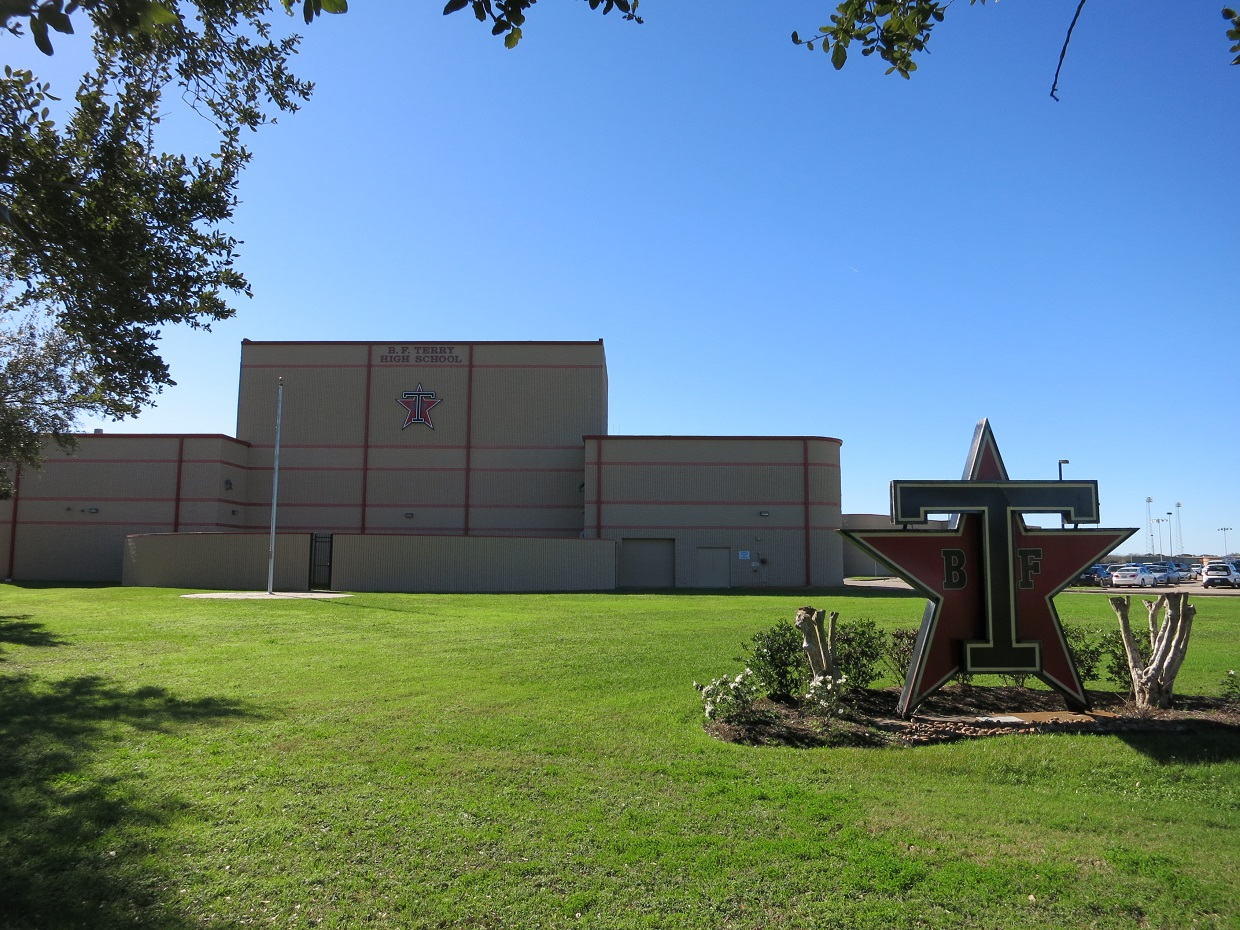
B. F. Terry High School

== Notable alumni ==
- Dexter Pittman (2006), former NBA player, 2012 NBA Champion
