= Rosenberg, Texas =

- City
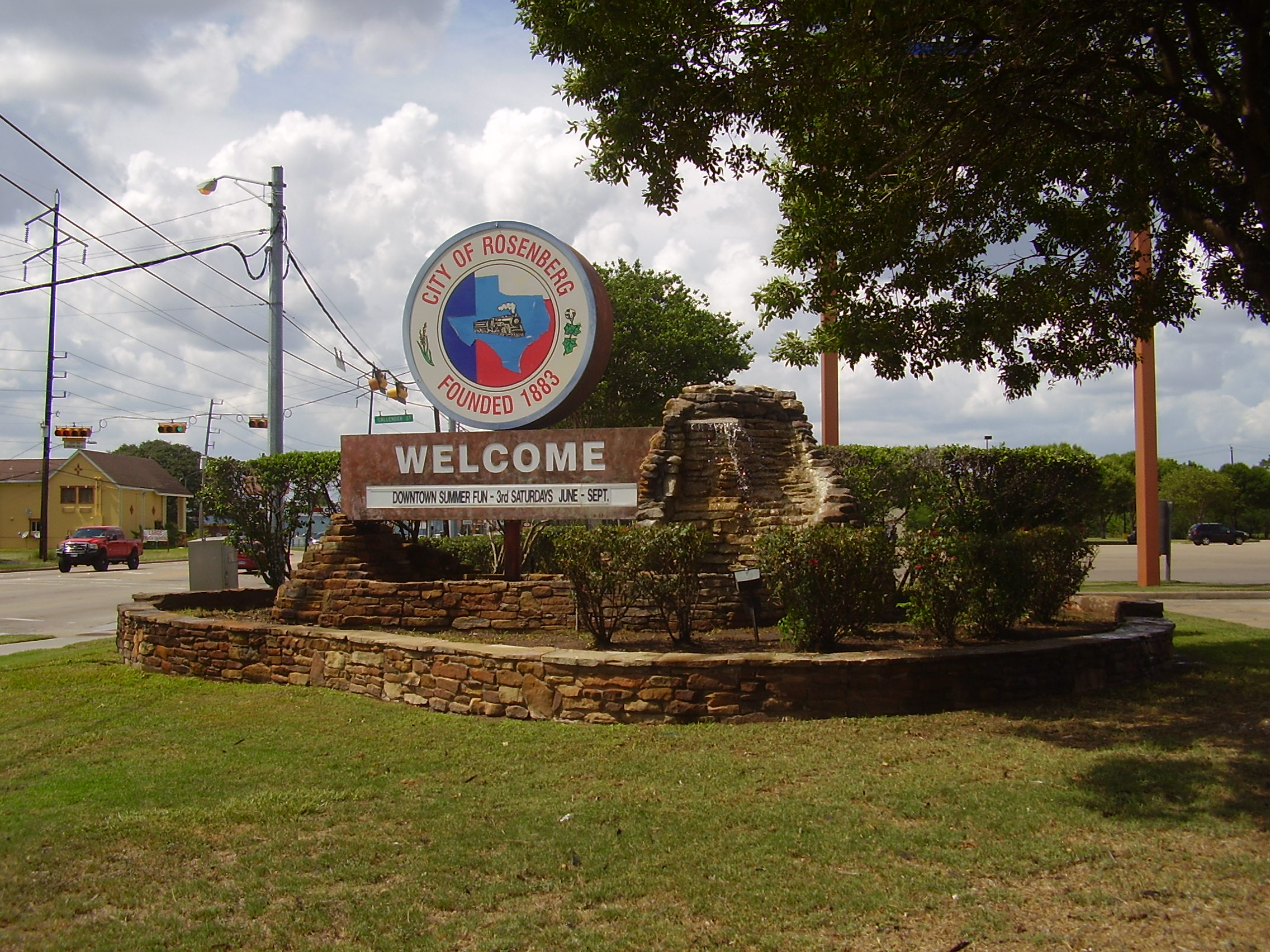
- Rosenberg welcome sign

- Location of Rosenberg, Texas
- Coordinates: 29°33′9″N 95°48′18″W
- Country: United States
- State: Texas
- County: Fort Bend

Government
  - Type: Council-Manager
  - City Council: Mayor: William Benton; Council At-Large 1: Richard Olson; Council At-Large 2: Jessica Jaramillo-Moreno; District 1: Felix Vargas, Jr. District 2: Steven DeGregorio; District 3: Hector Trevino; District 4: George Zepeda
  - City Manager: Joyce Vasut

Area
  - Total: 37.42 sq mi (96.91 km^{2})
  - Land: 37.26 sq mi (96.50 km^{2})
  - Water: 0.16 sq mi (0.41 km^{2})
- Elevation: 105 ft (32 m)

Population (2020)
  - Total: 38,282
  - Estimate (2025): 42,701
  - Density: 1,028.1/sq mi (396.97/km^{2})
- Demonym: Rosenberger
- Time zone: UTC-6 (Central (CST))
  - Summer (DST): UTC-5 (CDT)
- ZIP code: 77471
- Area codes: 281/346/621/713/832
- FIPS code: 48-63284
- GNIS feature ID: 1345587
- Website: rosenbergtx.gov

Rosenberg is a city in the U.S. state of Texas, within the Houston–Pasadena–The Woodlands metropolitan area and Fort Bend County. It was named for Henry Von Rosenberg, who immigrated to Texas from Switzerland in 1843. Von Rosenberg was an important figure in the settlement of Fort Bend County and the Gulf Coast region. The population was 38,282 at the 2020 census, up from 30,618 at the 2010 census. The community holds the Fort Bend County fair in October. Rosenberg is adjacent to the city of Richmond, the Fort Bend county seat.

== History ==
Rosenberg is named after Henry Rosenberg, who migrated from Switzerland to Galveston, Texas in 1843. He was the first president of the Gulf, Colorado and Santa Fe Railway.

== Geography ==
Rosenberg is located in central Fort Bend County at 29°33′9″N 95°48′18″W (29.552388, –95.804899), on the south side of the Brazos River. It is bordered to the northeast by Richmond, to the south by Pleak, and to the southwest by Beasley.

The Southwest Freeway (I-69 and US-59) runs through the south side of Rosenberg, bypassing the city center. The freeway leads northeast 32 miles (51 km) to downtown Houston, and US-59 continues southwest 92 miles (148 km) to Victoria and beyond.

According to the United States Census Bureau, Rosenberg has a total area of 22.5 square miles (58.4 km^{2}), of which 22.5 square miles (58.2 km^{2}) are land and 0.04 square miles (0.1 km^{2}), or 0.25%, is water.

=== Climate ===
The climate in the area is characterized by hot, humid summers and generally mild to cool winters. According to the Köppen climate classification system, Rosenberg has a humid subtropical climate, Cfa on climate maps.

== Demographics ==
Historical population
Census	Pop.	Note	%±
1910	1,198		—
1920	1,279		6.8%
1930	1,941		51.8%
1940	3,457		78.1%
1950	6,210		79.6%
1960	9,698		56.2%
1970	12,098		24.7%
1980	17,840		47.5%
1990	20,183		13.1%
2000	24,043		19.1%
2010	30,618		27.3%
2020	38,282		25.0%
2025 (est.)	42,701		11.5%
U.S. Decennial Census

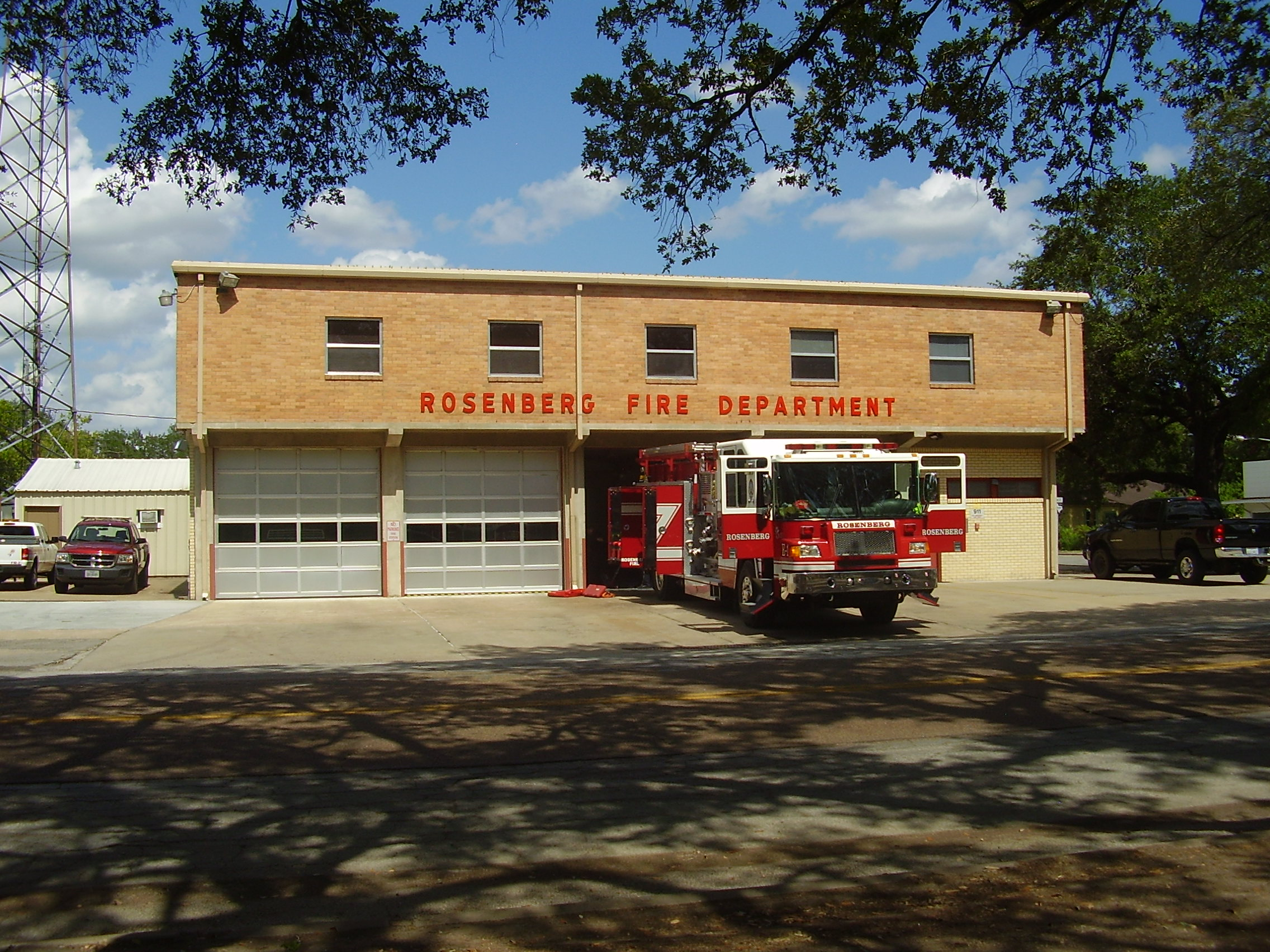
Rosenberg Fire Department

=== Racial and ethnic composition ===
Rosenberg city, Texas – Racial and ethnic composition Note: the US Census treats Hispanic/Latino as an ethnic category. This table excludes Latinos from the racial categories and assigns them to a separate category. Hispanics/Latinos may be of any race.
Race / Ethnicity (NH = Non-Hispanic)	Pop 2000	Pop 2010	Pop 2020	% 2000	% 2010	% 2020
White alone (NH)	8,515	7,608	8,208	35.42%	24.85%	21.44%
Black or African American alone (NH)	1,981	3,887	6,245	8.24%	12.70%	16.31%
Native American or Alaska Native alone (NH)	44	40	80	0.18%	0.13%	0.21%
Asian alone (NH)	80	292	1,675	0.33%	0.95%	4.38%
Native Hawaiian or Pacific Islander alone (NH)	6	13	5	0.02%	0.04%	0.01%
Other race alone (NH)	7	53	199	0.03%	0.17%	0.52%
Mixed race or Multiracial (NH)	195	255	772	0.81%	0.83%	2.02%
Hispanic or Latino (any race)	13,215	18,470	21,098	54.96%	60.32%	55.11%
Total	24,043	30,618	38,282	100.00%	100.00%	100.00%

=== 2020 census ===
As of the 2020 census, there were 38,282 people, 12,999 households, and 8,613 families residing in the city. The median age was 33.9 years, 27.4% of residents were under the age of 18, and 12.2% were 65 years of age or older. For every 100 females there were 93.3 males, and for every 100 females age 18 and over there were 89.6 males age 18 and over.

There were 12,999 households in Rosenberg, of which 40.9% had children under the age of 18 living in them. Of all households, 46.0% were married-couple households, 17.2% were households with a male householder and no spouse or partner present, and 30.1% were households with a female householder and no spouse or partner present. About 23.0% of all households were made up of individuals and 8.6% had someone living alone who was 65 years of age or older.

There were 14,045 housing units, of which 7.4% were vacant. The homeowner vacancy rate was 2.3% and the rental vacancy rate was 8.0%.

96.8% of residents lived in urban areas, while 3.2% lived in rural areas.

Racial composition as of the 2020 census
Race	Number	Percent
White	12,985	33.9%
Black or African American	6,512	17.0%
American Indian and Alaska Native	351	0.9%
Asian	1,700	4.4%
Native Hawaiian and Other Pacific Islander	15	0.0%
Some other race	8,754	22.9%
Two or more races	7,965	20.8%
Hispanic or Latino (of any race)	21,098	55.1%

=== 2000 census ===
At the 2000 census, there were 24,043 people, 7,933 households and 5,976 families residing in the city. The population density was 1,131.7 inhabitants per square mile (437.0/km^{2}). There were 8,438 housing units at an average density of 397.2 per square mile (153.4/km^{2}). The racial makeup of the city was 65.69% White, 8.53% African American, 0.37% Native American, 0.38% Asian, 0.04% Pacific Islander, 22.17% from other races, and 2.81% from two or more races. Hispanic or Latino of any race were 54.96% of the population.

There were 7,933 households, of which 41.3% had children under the age of 18 living with them, 53.4% were married couples living together, 15.7% had a female householder with no husband present, and 24.7% were non-families. 20.8% of all households were made up of individuals, and 8.1% had someone living alone who was 65 years of age or older. The average household size was 3.00 and the average family size was 3.48.

30.9% of the population were under the age of 18, 10.8% from 18 to 24, 30.0% from 25 to 44, 18.5% from 45 to 64, and 9.8% who were 65 years of age or older. The median age was 30 years. For every 100 females, there were 98.6 males. For every 100 females age 18 and over, there were 95.2 males.

The median household income was $35,510 and the median family income was $39,965. Males had a median income of $28,723 versus $21,945 for females. The per capita income for the city was $14,814. About 13.6% of families and 16.1% of the population were below the poverty line, including 20.7% of those under age 18 and 12.9% of those age 65 or over.

== Arts and culture ==
Fort Bend County Libraries operates the George Memorial Library, the main library, in Richmond. The main library was originally located in Rosenberg, near the Polly Ryon hospital. The library moved to Richmond in 1986. It underwent extensive renovations in 2013 and reopened with new technology, media rooms, and room design.

The Fort Bend Epicenter sports arena, located in Rosenberg, opened on August 26, 2023.

== Parks and recreation ==
The City of Rosenberg operates nine municipal parks within the city limits. Fort Bend County operates the Bud O'Shieles Community Center in Rosenberg. The two acre center includes an auditorium, meeting centers, and activities for elderly people.

== Government and infrastructure ==
Fort Bend County Animal Services has its facility (includes an animal shelter) in Rosenberg.

== Education ==
=== Public schools ===
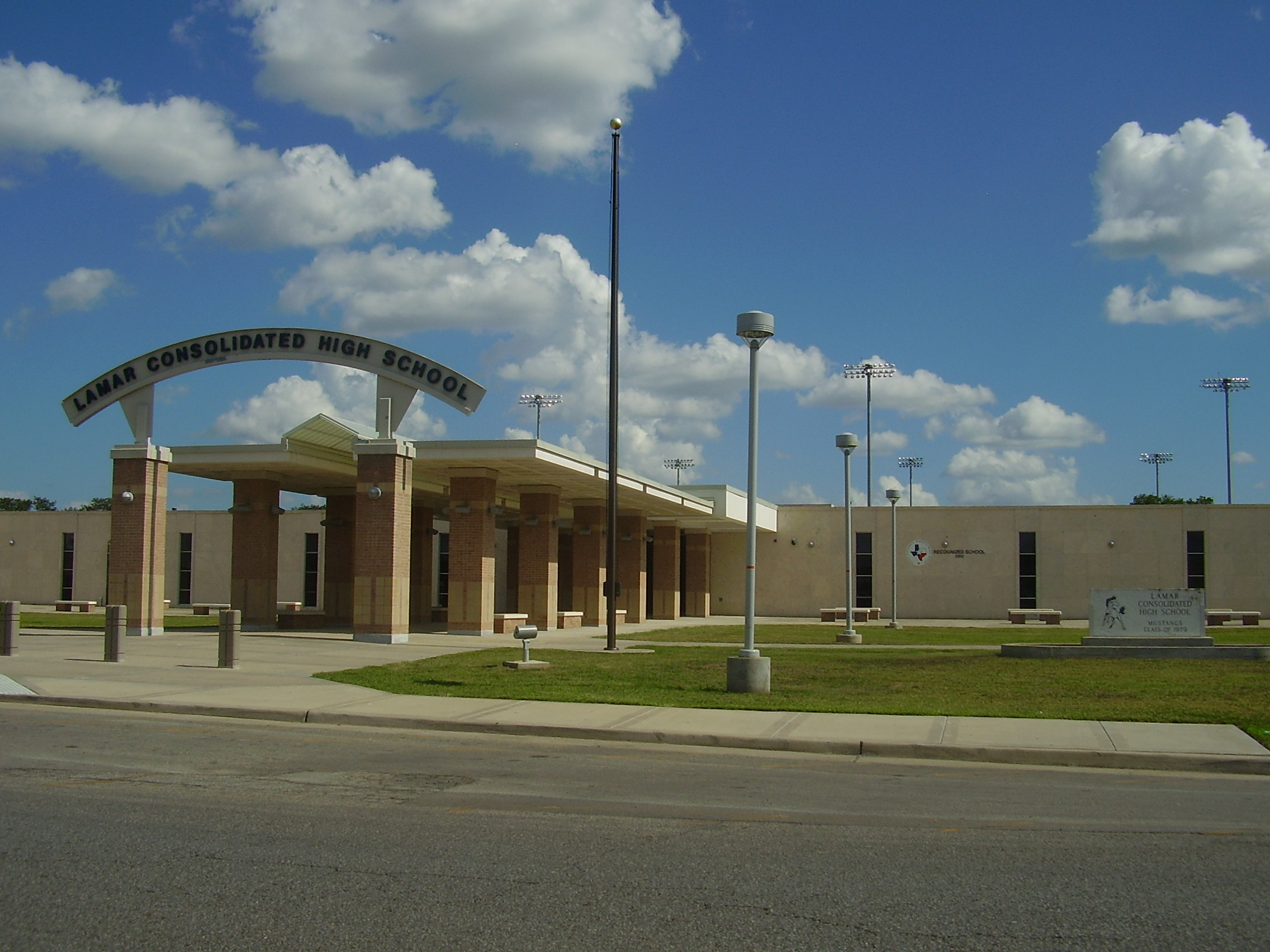
Lamar Consolidated High School

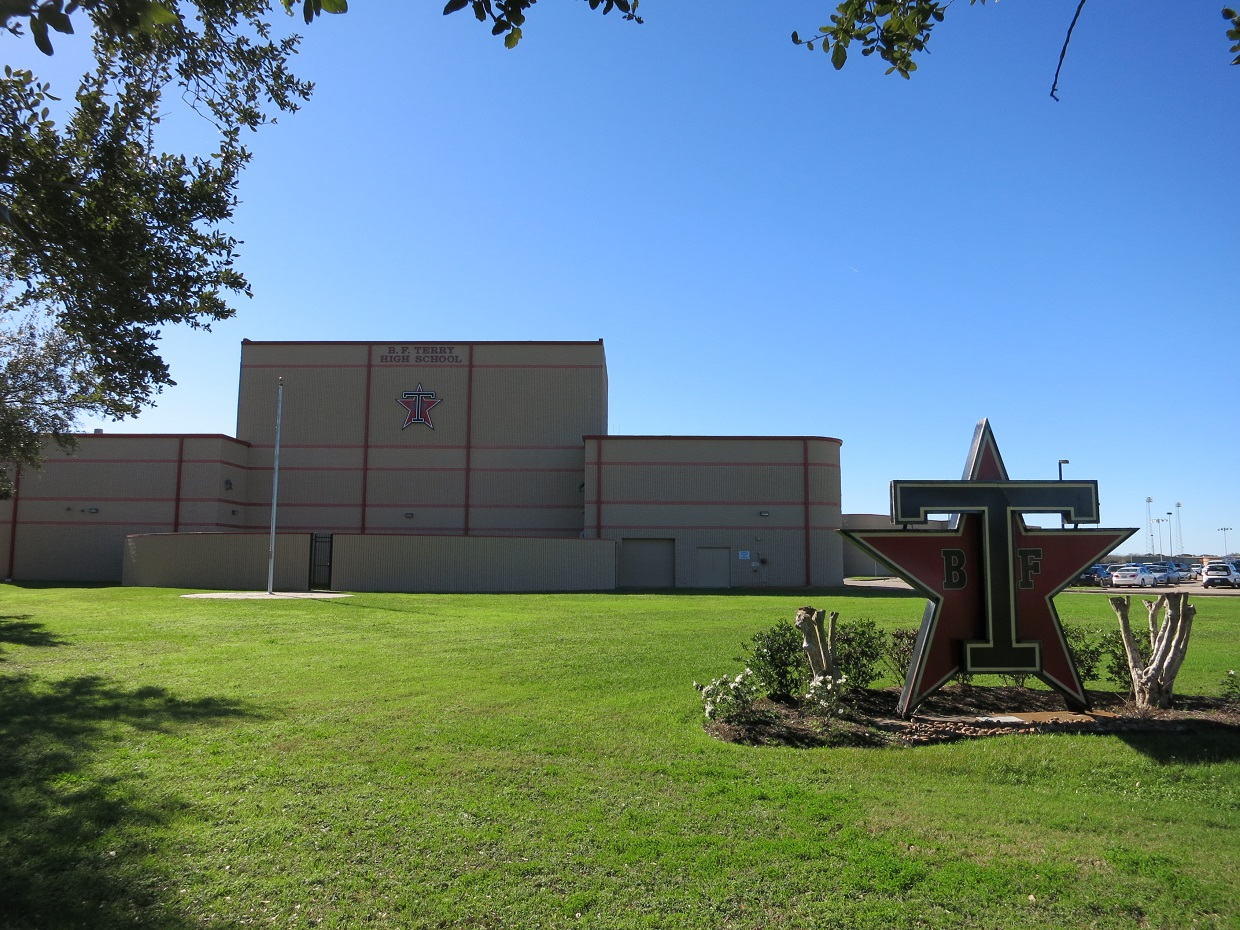
B. F. Terry High School

The majority of the Rosenberg city limits is within the Lamar Consolidated Independent School District. Elementary schools in Rosenberg include Arredondo, Bowie, Jackson, Taylor Ray, and Travis.

Middle and high schools in Rosenberg include Wessendorf Middle School, Lamar Junior High School, Navarro Middle School, George Junior High School, Lamar Consolidated High School, and B.F. Terry High School.

Additionally Wright Junior High School (grades 6-8), and Randle High School serve sections of Rosenberg; they are in an unincorporated area.

Small pieces of the Rosenberg city limits extend into the Brazos Independent School District.

=== Private schools ===
- Holy Rosary Catholic School, a K–8 school operated by the Roman Catholic Archdiocese of Galveston-Houston.
- Living Water Christian School, an early childhood-grade 11 Christian school in Rosenberg.

== Infrastructure ==
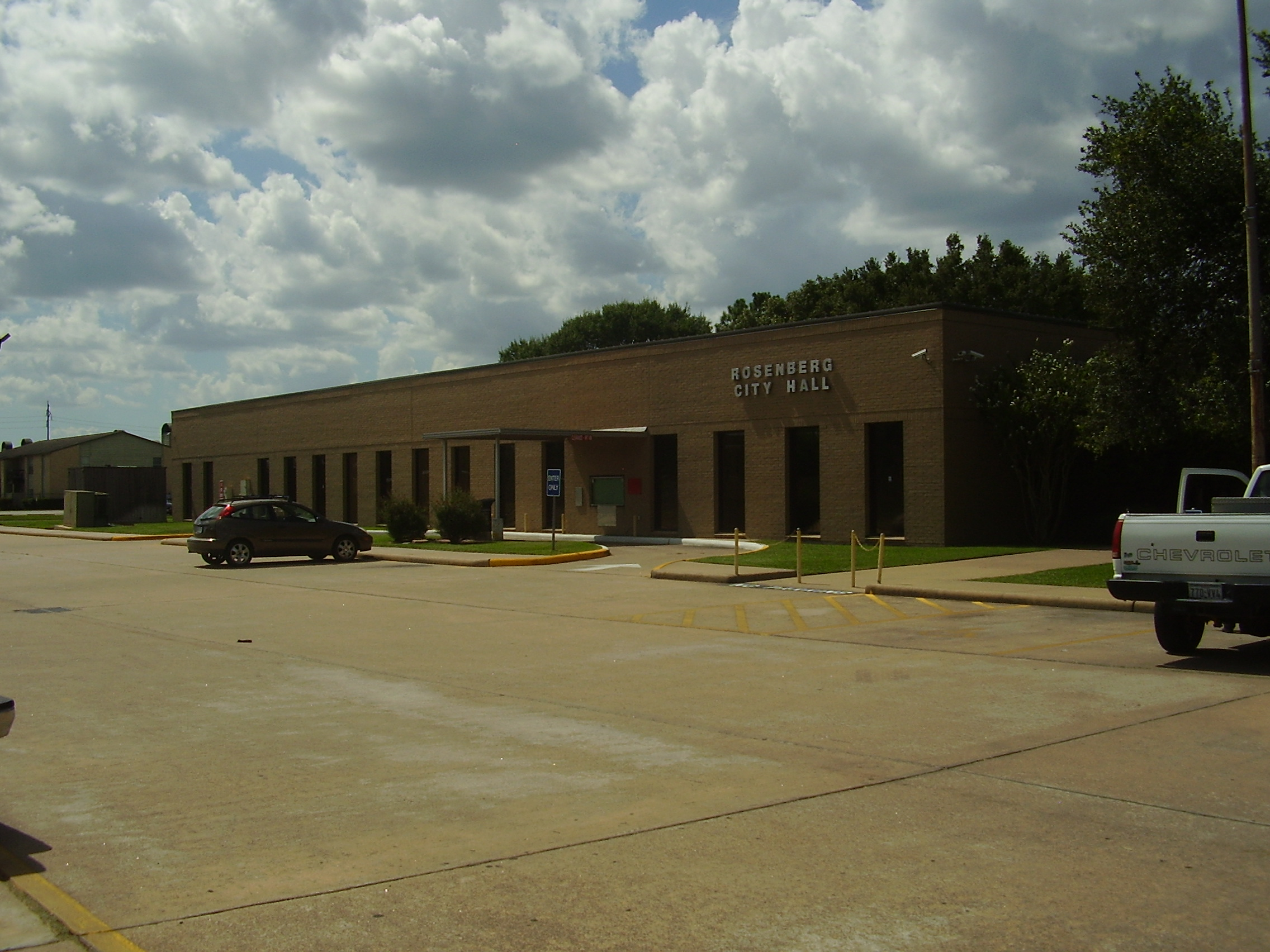
Rosenberg City Hall

Fort Bend County does not have a hospital district. OakBend Medical Center serves as the county's charity hospital, which the county contracts with.

=== Transportation ===
Fort Bend County Public Transportation provides local bus service and commuter service to Houston. Greyhound Bus Lines serves the Rosenberg Station at Raceway gas station.

== Notable people ==
- Randal Grichuk, MLB outfielder; played on the 2008 Lamar Consolidated Baseball Regional Finalist Team as well as the 2004 Little League World Series 3rd place team from Richmond, Texas
- John Holiday, operatic countertenor
- Dexter Pittman, NBA center, played five seasons in the league; attended B. F. Terry High School
- Clymer Wright, former editor of Fort Bend Reporter; conservative political activist in Greater Houston
