= John Zerwas =

Texan politician

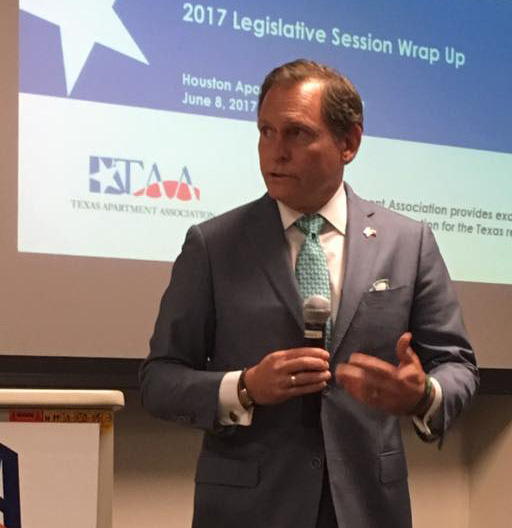
- Zerwas in 2017

13th Chancellor of the University of Texas System
- Incumbent
- Assumed office August 20, 2025
- Preceded by: James Milliken

Executive Vice Chancellor for Health Affairs of the University of Texas System
- In office October 1, 2019 – August 20, 2025
- Preceded by: Ray Greenberg
- Succeeded by: David Lakey

Member of the Texas House of Representatives from the 28th district
- In office January 9, 2007 – September 30, 2019
- Preceded by: Glenn Hegar
- Succeeded by: Gary Gates

Personal details
- Born: John McCall Zerwas Sr. March 24, 1955 (age 71)
- Party: Republican
- Spouses: Cynthia Zerwas (died 2013); Sylvia Haist (m. 2015)
- Children: 4
- Education: University of Houston (BS); Baylor College of Medicine (MD)
- Website: Office of the Chancellor

John McCall Zerwas Sr. (born March 24, 1955), is a physician from Richmond, Texas, who has served as the Chancellor of the University of Texas System since 2025. A member of the Republican Party, he previously served as the Executive Vice Chancellor for Health Affairs from 2019 to 2025. He also served as a member of the Texas House of Representatives from 2007 to 2019.

On June 1st, 2025, Zerwas was appointed interim Chancellor of the University of Texas System, replacing James Milliken. On August 20th, 2025, Zerwas was officially named chancellor of the University of Texas System.

== Personal life ==
Zerwas and his late wife, Cindy Hughes, graduated in 1973 from Bellaire High School and married in 1978. After graduating from the University of Houston, Zerwas earned his medical degree at Baylor College of Medicine in 1980 and started a full-time practice in 1985.

On March 1, 2012, Cindy was diagnosed with a brain tumor known as glioblastoma multiforme. She died on August 20, 2013.

Zerwas helped form the First Colony Church of Christ, and was one of its first deacons where his duties included forming the children's education and children's worship programs. He worked with the Boy Scouts of America to establish a troop in the Pecan Grove area, serving as cub master and den leader for several years. He also worked with the boys during the summer camp programs. He has participated in medical missions to Guatemala with the group Faith in Practice where he provided anesthesiology for charity surgeries.

John and his wife Sylvia Haist married in December 2015 and reside in Richmond; they together have six children and ten grandchildren.

== Background ==
Zerwas practices anesthesiology with US Anesthesia Partners (USAP), a group he co-founded and in which he remains active in the operations of the partnership. He founded his previous practice, Greater Houston Anesthesiology (GHA), in 1985, and served as president of that clinical practice from 1996 to 2000.

Zerwas served as President of the Memorial Hermann Health Network Providers from 2007 to 2009, and Chief Medical Officer of the Memorial Hermann Healthcare System in Houston from 2003 to 2009.

Zerwas served as the President of the American Society of Anesthesiologists (ASA) in 2013. A member of the Texas Society of Anesthesiologists, he served as President of the organization from 1996 to 1997. He is also a member of the Texas Medical Association.

== Texas House of Representatives ==
Zerwas was the representative for District 28, which at the time of his first election comprised the northwest portion of Fort Bend County. Municipalities (in whole or in part) in the district included Fulshear, Simonton, Weston Lakes, Orchard, Katy, and Rosenberg. It also included approximately 2,000 residents of the Fort Bend County portion of Houston.

=== 2018 reelection ===
Zerwas won his seventh legislative term in the general election held on November 6, 2018. With 44,306 votes (54.2 percent), he defeated Democrat, Meghan Scoggins, who polled 37,427 (45.8 percent).

Academic offices
Preceded by James Milliken	Chancellor of the University of Texas System; 2025–present	Incumbent
