= Tomas High School =

Gene Tomas High School
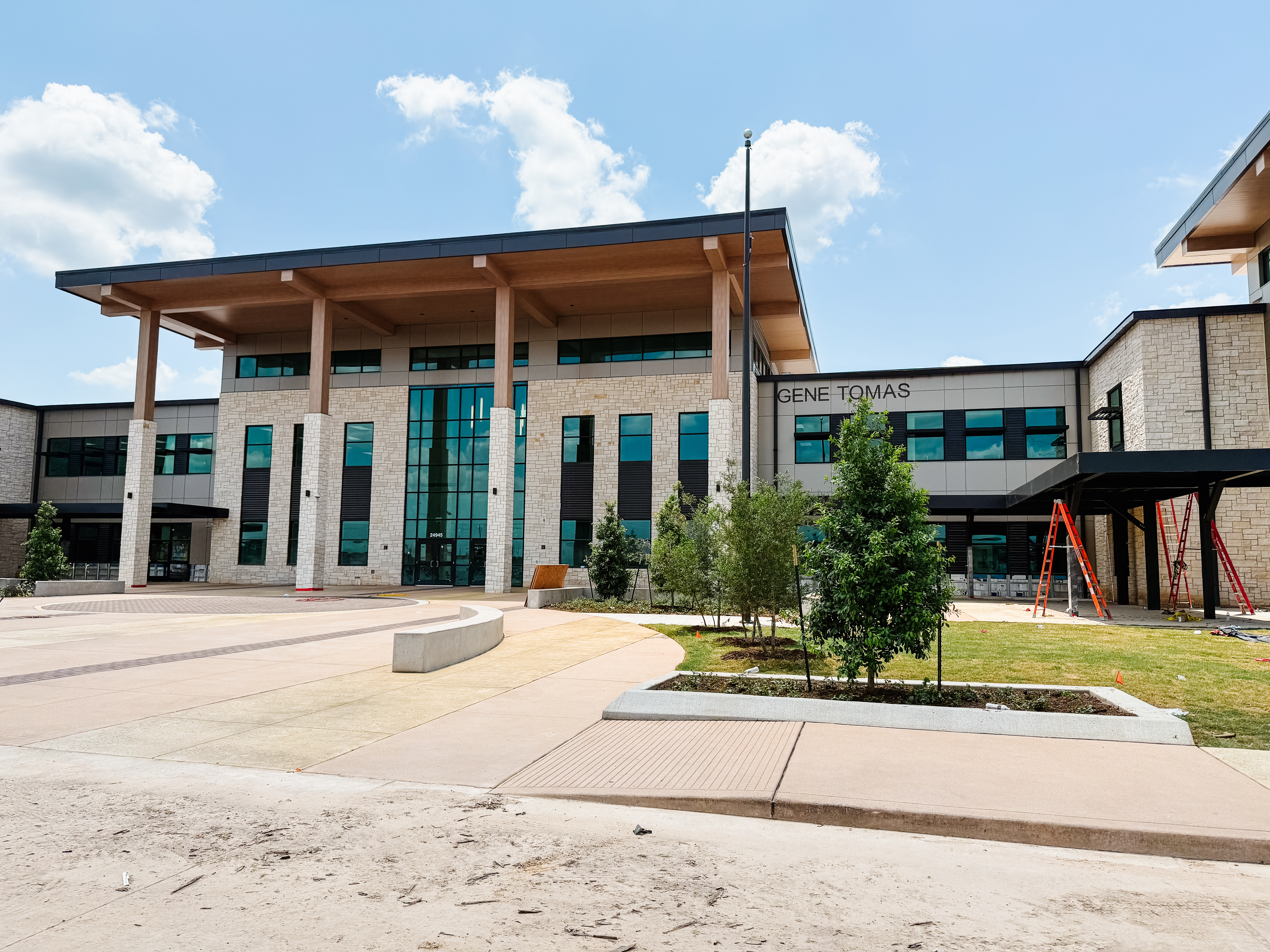

Location
- 24945 Easton Ramsey Way; Richmond, Texas 77406; United States; 29.67991°N 95.80900°W

Information
- Type: Public
- Established: 2025
- School district: Lamar Consolidated Independent School District
- NCES District ID: 4826580
- Superintendent: Roosevelt Nivens
- CEEB code: 205896
- Principal: Lilly Rincon
- Faculty: 73
- Grades: 9-11 (2025-2026)
- Enrollment: 1,394
- Colors: Green and white
- Mascot: Gators
- Website: tomashs.lcisd.org

Gene Tomas High School is a secondary public school located in unincorporated Fort Bend County, Texas, United States, south of Fulshear with a Richmond postal address.

The school is part of the Lamar Consolidated Independent School District. It opened on August 11, 2025, the first day of school in the 2025-2026 school year, with the intent of relieving student populations from Foster High School and Fulshear High School.

Tomas serves: Lakemont, Westheimer Lakes, Bella Terra, Covey Trails, Huntington Oaks, and Rolling Oaks.

It is the first secondary complex of Lamar CISD to feature an elementary school (Alice Deanne Fagert Elementary) accessible within the complex. A new stadium has been built to accommodate students in the northern area of Lamar CISD, to make up for Traylor Stadium being under repair.

The namesake was the inaugural principal of John and Randolph Foster High School, another high school within Lamar CISD.

== Feeder schools ==
Lamar CISD calls this feeder system the "Green Track." Feeder junior high and middle schools share the THS colors and mascot.

=== Junior high school ===
- Ella Banks Junior High School

=== Middle school ===
- Judge R.H. “Sandy” Bielstein Middle School

=== Elementary schools ===
- Adolphus Elementary School
- Bentley Elementary School
- Fagert Elementary School
- Hubenak Elementary School
- McNeill Elementary School
- Terrell Elementary School
