= Farm to Market Road 359 =

State highway in the state of Texas

Farm to Market Road 359

Route information
- Maintained by TxDOT
- Length: 46.2 mi (74.4 km)
- Existed: June 18, 1945–present

Major junctions
- South end: US 90 Alt. east of Richmond
- FM 1093 in Fulshear; I-10 in Brookshire
- North end: US 290 / SH 6 at Hempstead

Location
- Country: United States
- State: Texas
- Counties: Fort Bend, Waller

Highway system
- Highways in Texas; Interstate; US; State; Former; Toll; Loops; Spurs; FM/RM; Park; Rec
← FM 358	→ FM 360

Farm to Market Road 359 (FM 359) is a state highway in the U.S. state of Texas. The highway begins at U.S. Route 90 Alternate (US 90 Alt.) near Richmond in Fort Bend County. FM 359 heads in a northwesterly direction through Pecan Grove and Fulshear to Interstate 10 at Brookshire in Waller County. Continuing to the northwest, the highway passes through the small communities of Pattison, Monaville and Pine Island before ending at U.S. Route 290 (US 290) and Texas Highway 6 (SH 6) east of Hempstead.

== Route description ==
FM 359 begins at a traffic signal on US 90 Alt. 1.2 miles (1.9 km) northeast of the Brazos River bridge at Richmond. The highway immediately crosses the Union Pacific Railroad tracks and heads 2.2 miles (3.5 km) north through Pecan Grove. At the traffic light at Farmer Road, FM 359 turns in a westerly direction for 4.2 miles (6.8 km) to a traffic signal at FM 723. This intersection is just north of John and Randolph Foster High School in Lamar Consolidated Independent School District. After proceeding northwest, FM 359 passes through the rural community of Foster and turns in a northerly direction. The highway passes Hines Nurseries Inc., briefly veers west at Fulshear-Gaston Road, and turns north before reaching the intersection of FM 1093 and FM 1463 at a traffic signal. The section between FM 723 and FM 1093 is about 5.4 miles (8.7 km) in length.

FM 359 turns west for 3.3 miles (5.3 km) to Fulshear. In this stretch, the highway shares its right-of-way with FM 1093. At Fulshear, FM 359 heads northwest a distance of 7.0 miles (11.3 km) to Interstate 10 at Brookshire. In this portion of the highway, there is an historical marker at the site of Pittsville near Hunt Road, 2.8 miles (4.5 km) north of Fulshear. The highway continues north 0.5 miles (0.8 km) from the interstate underpass to US 90, then turns west on the US 90 right-of-way for 0.35 miles (0.6 km) to Bains Street where FM 359 turns to the north again. After 0.15 miles (0.2 km) on Bains Street, there is a fork where FM 362 splits off to the north while FM 359 heads to the northwest. The highway continues 3.5 miles (5.6 km) northwest to Pattison where it intersects with westbound FM 1458. From Pattison, FM 359 heads first north, then northwest a distance of 6.6 miles (10.6 km) to the intersection with FM 529 and then an additional 2.5 miles (4.0 km) to Monaville where it intersects with FM 1887 which goes west. From Monaville to the intersection with westbound FM 3346 in Pine Island is a distance of 7.3 miles (11.7 km). Continuing north on FM 359 from Pine Island to US 290 Business is 2.0 miles (3.2 km). After an additional 1.2 miles (1.9 km), FM 359 ends at a limited access highway interchange with US 290 and SH 6 to the east of Hempstead.

== History ==
FM 359 was originally designated on June 18, 1945, to run from 1.0 mile (1.6 km) east of Richmond northwest to the Waller County line and from Richmond south to Thompsons. On the same day, the order was amended to extend the highway northwest through Brookshire to SH 6 southeast of Hempstead. On September 26, 1945, FM 359 was extended west to US 290 near Hempstead. On August 1, 1947, the section from Richmond south to Thompsons was canceled. (The canceled section is the 2010 route of FM 762 and FM 2759.) On December 15, 1982, the highway was extended north about 1.0 mile (1.6 km) from the old US 290 to the new US 290 right-of-way.

== Major intersections ==
County	Location	mi	km	Destinations	Notes
Fort Bend	Richmond	0.0	0.0	US 90 Alt. to Rosenberg—Sugar Land	Southern terminus of FM 359
Fort Bend	Foster, Fort Bend County	6.4	10.3	FM 723 to Rosenberg	
Fort Bend		11.8	19.0	FM 1093 / FM 1463 to Houston	Start of concurrency with FM 1093
Fort Bend	Fulshear	15.0	24.1	FM 1093 to Simonton	End of concurrency with FM 1093
Waller	Brookshire	22.1	35.6	I-10 to Sealy—Katy	I-10 exit 732.
Waller	Brookshire	22.6	36.4	US 90 to Sealy—Katy	
Waller	Brookshire	23.1	37.2	FM 362 to Waller	Southern terminus of FM 362
Waller	Pattison	26.6	42.8	FM 1458 to San Felipe	Northern terminus of FM 1458
Waller		33.2	53.4	FM 529 to Bellville—Houston	
Waller	Monaville	35.7	57.5	FM 1887 to Hempstead	Southern terminus of FM 1887
Waller	Pine Island	43.0	69.2	FM 3346	Eastern terminus of FM 3346
Waller	Hempstead	45.0	72.4	Bus. US 290 to Prairie View	
Waller	Hempstead	46.2	74.4	US 290 / SH 6 to Prairie View	Northern terminus of FM 359
1.000 mi = 1.609 km; 1.000 km = 0.621 mi

== Gallery ==
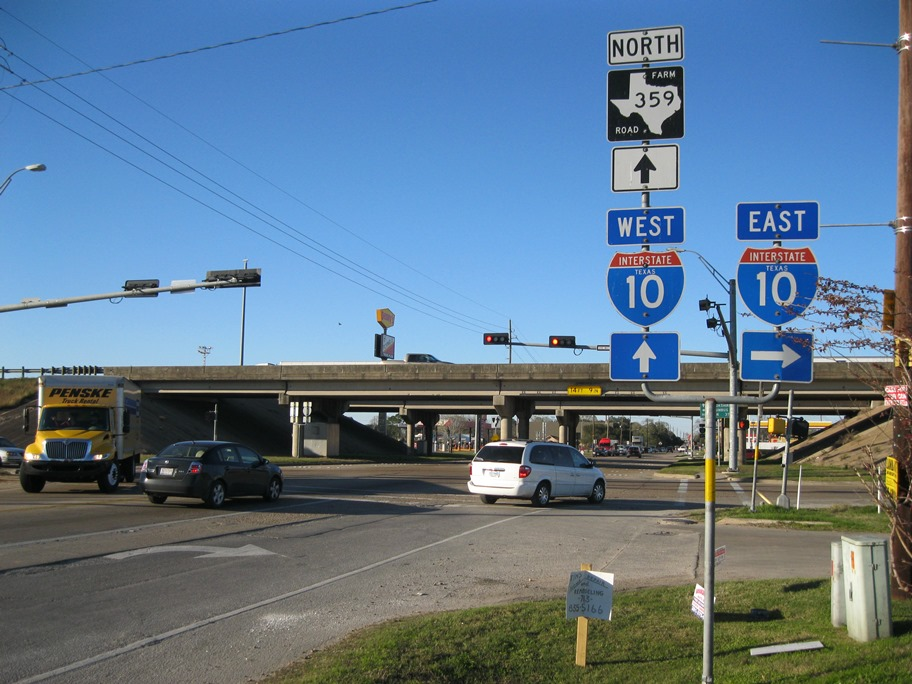
View north on FM 359 at the I-10 overpass in Brookshire

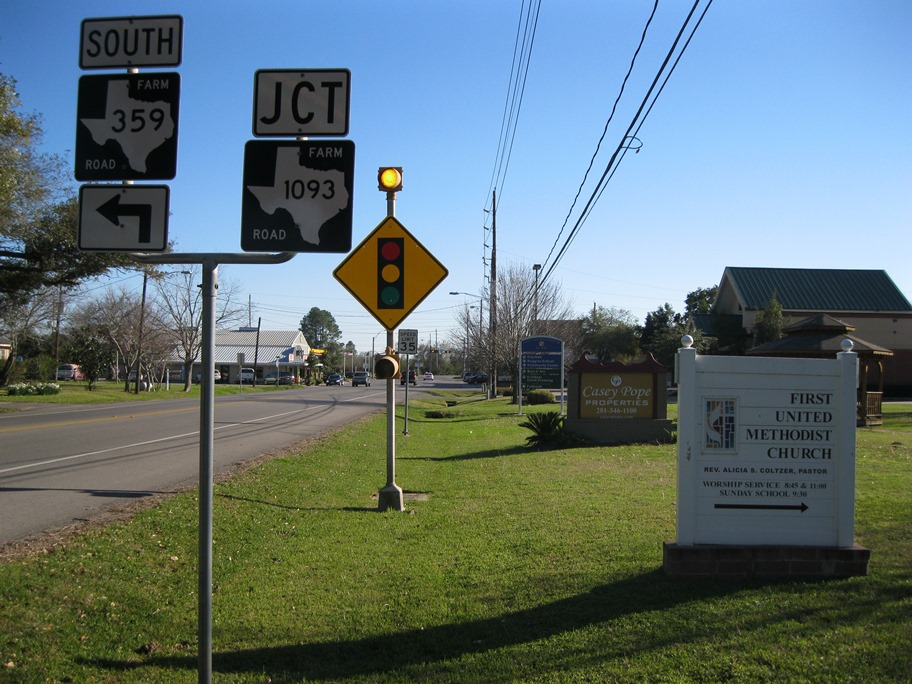
View south on FM 359 toward FM 1093 in Fulshear

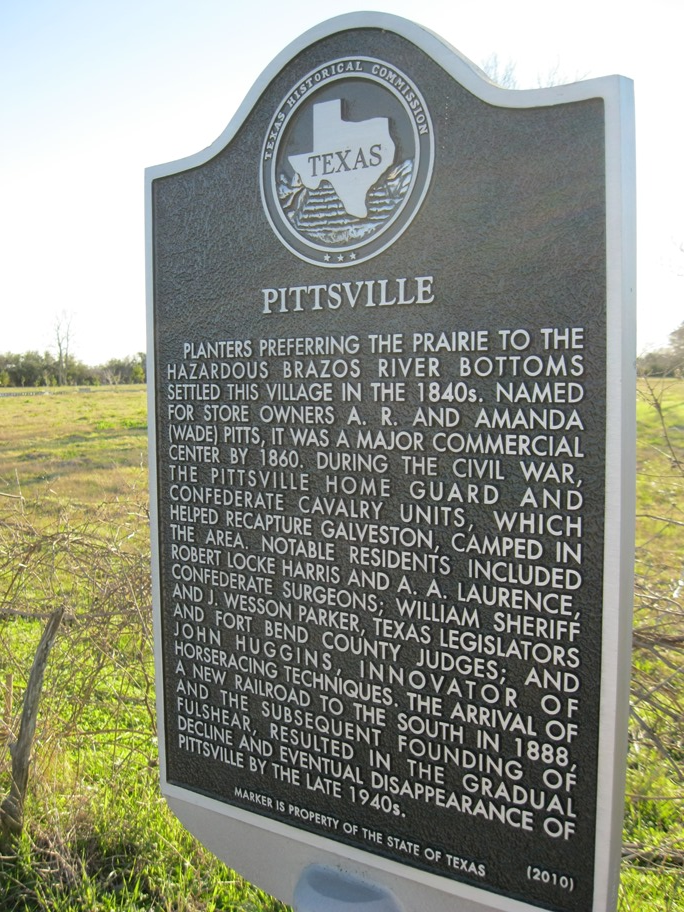
Historical marker at the site of Pittsville on FM 359
