= Weston Lakes, Texas =

- City
- Location within Texas Location within the United States
- Coordinates: 29°41′00″N 95°56′09″W
- Country: United States
- State: Texas
- County: Fort Bend
- Incorporated: 2008

Area
  - Total: 2.74 sq mi (7.10 km^{2})
  - Land: 2.65 sq mi (6.87 km^{2})
  - Water: 0.089 sq mi (0.23 km^{2})

Population (2020)
  - Total: 3,853
  - Density: 1,509.9/sq mi (582.97/km^{2})
- ZIP code: 77441
- Area codes: 713, 281, 832, 346
- FIPS code: 48-77746
- GNIS feature ID: 2518811
- Website: westonlakestexas.gov

Weston Lakes is a city in Fort Bend County, Texas, United States, within Greater Houston. Residents voted to incorporate the community in an election held on May 10, 2008. At the time of incorporation, there were about 2,300 residents living in Weston Lakes. The population was 3,853 as of the 2020 census.

== Geography ==
Weston Lakes is located along FM 1093, between the cities of Fulshear and Simonton in northern Fort Bend County. It covers an area of approximately 1,400 acres (570 ha). According to the U.S. Census Bureau, the city has a total area of 2.7 square miles (7.1 km^{2}), of which 2.7 square miles (6.9 km^{2}) is land and 0.1 square miles (0.2 km^{2}), or 3.31%, is water. The Brazos River forms the southern and part of the eastern boundary of the city.

== Demographics ==
Historical population
Census	Pop.	Note	%±
2010	2,482		—
2020	3,853		55.2%
U.S. Decennial Census

=== Racial and ethnic composition ===
Weston Lakes city, Texas – Racial and ethnic composition Note: the US Census treats Hispanic/Latino as an ethnic category. This table excludes Latinos from the racial categories and assigns them to a separate category. Hispanics/Latinos may be of any race.
Race / Ethnicity (NH = Non-Hispanic)	Pop 2010	Pop 2020	% 2010	% 2020
White alone (NH)	2,050	3,057	82.59%	79.34%
Black or African American alone (NH)	141	153	5.68%	3.97%
Native American or Alaska Native alone (NH)	17	8	0.68%	0.21%
Asian alone (NH)	74	93	2.98%	2.41%
Native Hawaiian or Pacific Islander alone (NH)	0	1	0.00%	0.03%
Other race alone (NH)	0	17	0.00%	0.44%
Mixed race or Multiracial (NH)	24	160	0.97%	4.15%
Hispanic or Latino (any race)	176	364	7.09%	9.45%
Total	2,482	3,853	100.00%	100.00%

=== 2020 census ===
As of the 2020 census, Weston Lakes had a population of 3,853, with 1,410 households, including 1,228 families residing in the city.

The median age was 51.2 years, with 21.3% of residents under the age of 18 and 26.4% aged 65 years or older.

For every 100 females there were 97.8 males, and for every 100 females age 18 and over there were 94.7 males age 18 and over.

100.0% of residents lived in urban areas, while 0.0% lived in rural areas.

There were 1,410 households in Weston Lakes, of which 31.8% had children under the age of 18 living in them. Of all households, 82.1% were married-couple households, 5.7% were households with a male householder and no spouse or partner present, and 9.9% were households with a female householder and no spouse or partner present. About 9.4% of all households were made up of individuals and 6.6% had someone living alone who was 65 years of age or older.

There were 1,446 housing units, of which 2.5% were vacant. The homeowner vacancy rate was 1.4% and the rental vacancy rate was 0.0%.

Racial composition as of the 2020 census
Race	Number	Percent
White	3,154	81.9%
Black or African American	157	4.1%
American Indian and Alaska Native	11	0.3%
Asian	93	2.4%
Native Hawaiian and Other Pacific Islander	1	0.0%
Some other race	49	1.3%
Two or more races	388	10.1%
Hispanic or Latino (of any race)	364	9.4%

== Incorporation ==
With the rapid population growth across Fort Bend County, particularly in the nearby city of Fulshear, some Weston Lakes residents felt that incorporation was the only way to prevent the community from eventually being annexed by Fulshear or another municipality.

The incorporation vote took place on May 10, 2008. Of the 977 valid votes cast, 569 (58.24%) were in favor of incorporation and 408 (41.76%) were opposed. Voter participation was high with slightly over 74 percent of those eligible casting ballots. On May 20, 2008, members of the Fort Bend County Commissioners Court voted to record the results of the election, officially incorporating Weston Lakes as a municipality.

Fort Bend County confirmed that a protest of the incorporation of Weston Lakes has been made. The lawsuit charges that the May incorporation vote was flawed due to a combination of alleged deficiencies in Texas law and its policies, as well as alleged violations of law by the Fort Bend County government and the Weston Lakes Property Owners Association.

The first municipal election took place on November 4, 2008. A total of fifteen candidates competed for six Alderman positions. Mary Rose Zdunkewicz, a 21-year Weston Lakes resident who served on the Lamar Consolidated ISD school board for twelve years during the 1970s and 1980s, was designated the city's first mayor because she received the most votes (561) among the candidates. The five candidates immediately trailing Zdunkewicz – Clifton H. Aldrich (504), Gary L. Owens (486), Denis Deluca (472), Trent Thomas (435), and Ted Case II (419) – will each serve on the city council as Aldermen. The position of city marshal was won by Ron Horowitz who ran unopposed.

== Government and infrastructure ==
Fort Bend County does not have a hospital district. OakBend Medical Center serves as the county's charity hospital which the county contracts with.

== Education ==
Weston Lakes is served by the Lamar Consolidated Independent School District. Students attend Morgan Elementary (Grades Pre K–5), Leaman Junior High (Grades 6–8), and Fulshear High School (Grades 9–12).

It was previously zoned to Foster High School.

Simonton Christian Academy is located in nearby Simonton.
