= Pittsville, Texas =

Coordinates: 29°43′23″N 95°55′29″W

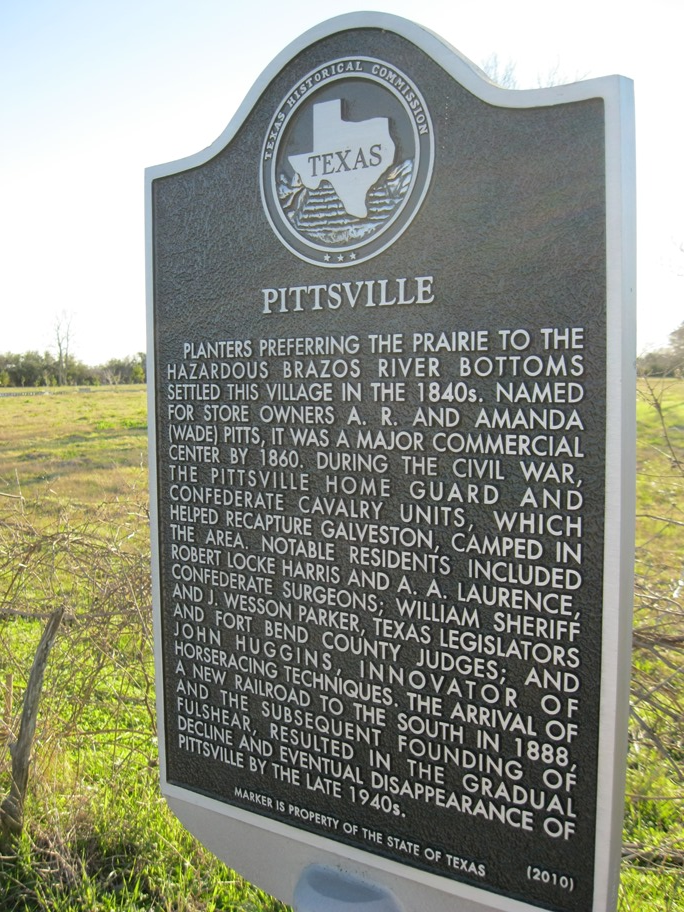
Pittsville historical marker on FM 359

Pittsville is an unincorporated area that formerly held a distinct community in Fort Bend County, Texas, United States. The site is along Farm to Market Road 359 near Hunt Road and is nineteen miles northwest of Richmond and three miles north of Fulshear. Some consider Pittsville a Texas ghost town since its last residents left in the 1940s. The area is growing, as Greater Houston stretches westward into the Katy–Fulshear–Simonton area.

== History ==
=== Texas Historical Markers ===
There is a Texas Historical Commission marker on the west side of FM 359 a short distance north of the intersection of FM359 and Hunt Road:

Planters preferring the prairie to the hazardous Brazos River bottoms settled this village in the 1840s. Named for store owners A. R. and Amanda (Wade) Pitts, it was a major commercial center by 1860. During the Civil War, the Pittsville Home Guard and Confederate cavalry units, which helped recapture Galveston, camped in the area. Notable residents included Robert Locke Harris and A. A. Laurence, Confederate surgeons; William Sheriff and J. Wesson Parker, Texas legislators and Fort Bend County judges; and John Huggins, innovator of horseracing techniques. The arrival of a new railroad to the south in 1888, and the subsequent founding of Fulshear, resulted in the gradual decline and eventual disappearance of Pittsville by the late 1940s.

Another account of Pittsville history explains:

The settlement began to grow when early plantation owners, finding it impossible to live in the swampy, though fertile, Brazos River bottoms, built their homes on the high prairie lands away from the threat of floods. The settlement was named for the Pitts family, who operated a store and distributed the mail. All the people up the Brazos River who did not get their mail at Richmond were included in Pittsville. The 1860 census listed some 240 people living in Pittsville. Farming and stock raising were the main occupations, but also listed were wagoners, carpenters, schoolteachers, a brick mason, an engineer, a minister, a merchant, a clerk, a physician, a wheelwright, a machinist, an artesian-well borer, and other workers. As the years passed the town had several general stores, as well as a blacksmith shop, a millinery shop, a photo studio, and a two-story school or academy. Pittsville acquired a post office on May 31, 1870, with Mrs. Lucy Upton and postmistress. The post office was discontinued on June 15, 1889, because the San Antonio and Aransas Pass Railroad had bypassed the community, the town of Fulshear had been established, and the people of Pittsville were moving to Fulshear to be near the railroad. The last residents of Pittsville were Mrs. Alice (J. R.) Nesbitt and her daughter, Doris, who moved away in 1947. Since that time the only evidences of Pittsville are an abandoned cistern and a clump of trees.

Prominent Pittsville families included the Bains, Walkers, Nesbitts, Cumings, Hugginses, Brookshires, Harrises and Pools.

=== Confederate Army enlistees and supporters ===
Oral history that has been captured revels that Pittsville residents openly support the Confederate Army in the US Civil War.

James Ashley Davis was a handsome, happy-go-lucky, man from Pittsville who was kind to both men and animals. When he was still a young man, he joined the Confederacy and engaged in the Civil War. Accompanied by a man servant, he rode off too battle mounted on a grey horse. When his friends suggested that he made a good target on a grey horse, he said he did not think the Yankee soldiers were marksmen. He was mistaken, however, as he was wounded several times. One of his wounds was through the mouth and would appear as dimples on both cheeks for the rest of his life. Davis fought at Shiloh and Murfreesboro, Tennessee, before returning to home to recover from his wounds. Once healed, he rejoined the fighting until the war ended. It's told he was a sober Christian man who was trusted by local ranchers to drive their cattle to market. He made several trips over the trails with Texas Longhorns to the rail head at Abilene, Kansas. While living in a ranch house at Foster, Davis died in 1906.

=== Postmasters, 1870–1889 ===
As mentioned above, Pittsville acquired a post office on May 31, 1870 and was discontinued on June 15, 1889 when most residents moved three miles south to be near the new railroad depot built in Fulshear.

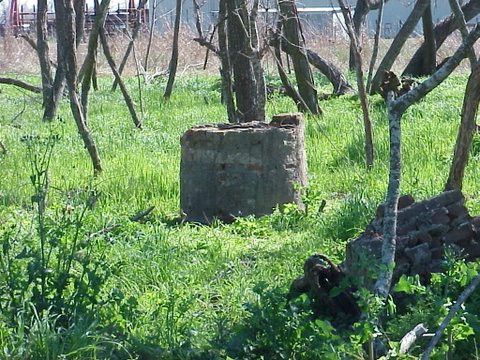
This cement cistern is one of the few remnants of Pittsville, Texas. It is located 50 yards behind the Historical Marker on FM 359.

The following served as a Pittsville Postmaster:

- Lucy Upton, May 31, 1870 – Oct 25, 1871; (re-established) Nov 20, 1871 – Mar 5, 1873
- Thomas Russell, Mar 5, 1873 – Apr 24, 1873
- Cliff Axson, (re-established) Sept 20,1877 – Apr 26, 1880
- Warren Miller, Apr 26, 1880 – Jan 25, 1881
- William Sims, Jan 25, 1881 – Oct 1, 1884
- Warren Miller, Oct 1, 1884 – Jun 8, 1888
- Wade M Robinson, Jun 8, 1888 – May 28, 1889

In being discontinued 28 May 1889; the Postmaster papers were sent to Leslie in Waller County.

=== The 1888 Shooting of Lamar Johnson ===
Around 11 pm on Saturday, October 13, 1888, an incident reflecting deep socio-political divisions occurred at the Liberty Hope Church, which was in the vicinity of Pittsville. While local black residents gathered for a church festival, half a dozen white men rode up to the church and called out for two local black politicians, Taylor Randon and his half-brother Lamar Johnson. As Randon and Johnson came out of the Church and headed toward the bushes, the white men opened fire, injuring Randon's hand and killing Johnson. Randon supposedly had made some anti-Jaybird comments early that evening in Richmond, where the county government was located. After this incident, Randon supposedly fled the county to Houston out of fear for his life.

The six young white men arrested by the local sheriff were members of the Fort Bend County Jaybirds, who were predominantly white and used violent means like this killing to remove the Woodpeckers, who were predominantly black with some white allies, from running the county government. Those arrested included Dick Preston, Walter Sims, Theophilus Simington, Seth Miller, Fred Fuller, and George Lass. Most revealing is Theophilus Simington, whose last name is most likely misspelled. The Simontons were a predominant Fort Bend family and the founders of the Simonton plantation that eventually evolved into the present-day town of Simonton. The Simontons were avid Jaybirds who resisted the post-Civil War Reconstruction efforts.

During 1888 and 1889, the Jaybird-Woodpecker feud raged throughout Fort Bend country. This particular incident created quite a stir in regional and national newspapers, that included testimonials and conflicting information, including from Taylor Randon and the local Sheriff, Tom Garvey. Randon played down the political feud, stating the incident was about a fight over several women, and asked for the Jaybirds to protect him when he planned to return. Sheriff Garvey, who was a Woodpecker, was forced to move his family to Galveston for their safety as he was "compelled to apologize for his severe strictures upon the negro killers."

- "Fort Bend Troubles," Galveston Daily News (Galveston, Texas), October 18, 1888
- "The Beneficiaries of Murder," Democrat and Chronicle (Rochester, New York), October 25, 1888
- "“A Foul Assassination," The Galveston Daily News (Galveston, Texas), October 16, 1888

This small incident reflected a larger feud over power, money, and race in Fort Bend and Texas generally. Retaliatory murders occurred on both sides, including "the 1889 killing of the local sheriff Tom Garvey (a Woodpecker). The violence culminated in the Battle of Richmond, the county seat, on August 16, 1889, when Sheriff Garvey was killed."

== Education ==
Area residents are zoned to schools in the Lamar Consolidated Independent School District.
