= Foster, Fort Bend County, Texas =

Foster, Texas
- Unincorporated community
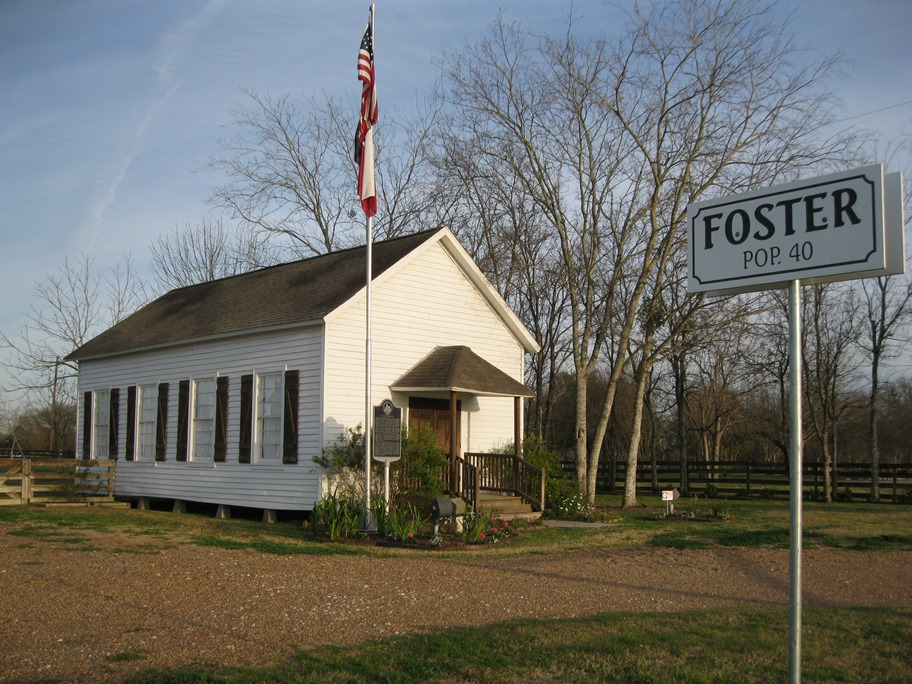
- Foster Community Museum on FM 359

- Location within Texas Location within the United States
- Coordinates: 29°39′2″N 95°49′56″W
- Country: United States
- State: Texas
- County: Fort Bend
- Elevation: 108 ft (33 m)
- Time zone: UTC-6 (Central (CST))
  - Summer (DST): UTC-5 (CDT)
- ZIP code: 77406
- Area code: 281

Foster is an unincorporated community located in Fort Bend County, Texas, United States. It is located within the Greater Houston metropolitan area.

== History ==
Foster is situated on land that John and Randolph Foster were granted in 1824. The Foster plantation produced sugarcane and rice before the American Civil War. When the Foster community obtained a post office in 1882, the settlement was officially established. Foster had 60 residents, a steam gristmill and cotton gin, a physician, and semiweekly mail delivery in 1884. Three gristmills and daily postal delivery were available in the town in 1892. A general store and a flour mill were erected by 1896. The community gained notoriety for producing pecans in 1914, but by 1925, just 40 people were living in the village; in 1931, there was only one business mentioned and no population estimate. In 1936, a blacktop road served Foster. Foster was still a community in 1990, despite the post office closing by the 1940s. In 2000, there were no accessible population estimates.

On November 21, 1992, an F2 tornado struck Foster.

The community is home to the Old Foster Community Museum.

== Geography ==
Foster is located on Farm to Market Road 359, 10 mi (16 km) northwest of Richmond in northwestern Fort Bend County.

== Education ==
In 1897, Foster had two segregated schools for White and Black students. They continued to operate in 1936 and closed in the 1940s.

Today, the community is served by the Lamar Consolidated Independent School District. Students who live in the community attend Bentley Elementary School, Briscoe Junior High School, and John and Randolph Foster High School.
