= Fulshear High School =

Public school in Texas, United States

Churchill Fulshear, Jr. High School
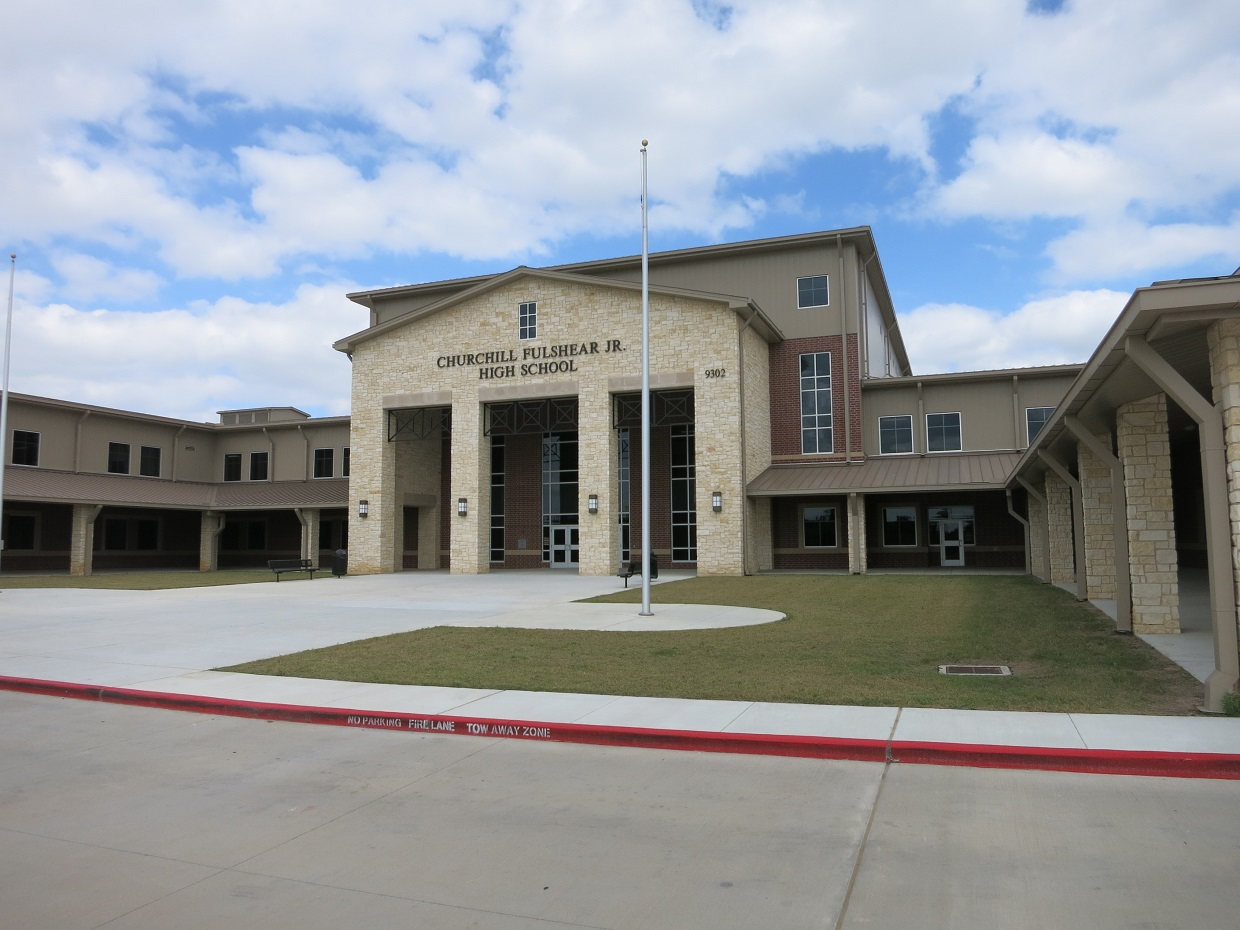

Location
- 9302 Charger Way; Fulshear, Texas 77441; United States; 29.6975218°N 95.88668570000004°W

Information
- Type: Public high school
- Established: 2016
- School district: Lamar Consolidated Independent School District
- Principal: Jesse Watkins
- Staff: 116.53 (FTE)
- Grades: 9-12
- Enrollment: 2,464 (2022–23)
- Student to teacher ratio: 21.14
- Colors: Purple, and Black
- Athletics: UIL
- Athletics conference: University Interscholastic League
- Team name: Chargers
- Website: fulshearhs.lcisd.org

Churchill Fulshear, Jr. High School is a public senior high school in the LCISD Education Center in Fulshear, Texas, and in the Houston metropolitan area. The school, which serves the LCISD portion of Fulshear, Weston Lakes, and Simonton, is a part of the Lamar Consolidated Independent School District (LCISD). The school's namesake was a part of the Fulshear family, one of the first Anglo white families to settle Texas, and fought in the Texas Revolution.

It is the first high school to primarily serve Fulshear.

== History ==
The district bought the land for it in 2008.

PBK Architects was hired as the architectural firm.

The school opened in the fall of 2016 with grades 9 and 10, and over the following two years added grades 11 and 12. The first principal was Daniel Ward, and the dedication ceremony occurred in December of that year.

== Feeder schools ==
Lamar CISD calls this feeder system the "Purple Track." Feeder junior high and middle schools share the FHS colors and mascot.

=== Junior high school ===
- Dean Leaman Junior High School

=== Middle school ===
- James W. Roberts Middle School

=== Elementary schools ===
- Haygood Elementary School
- Huggins Elementary School
- Lindsey Elementary School
- Melton Elementary School
- Morgan Elementary School
- Randle Elementary School
- Slawinski Elementary School
- Tamarron Elementary School

== Athletics ==
The school's first athletic director and American football coach, Oschlor Flemming, previously worked at Dulles High School as the head football coach and Guyer High School in Denton, Texas as the assistant football coach. In 2018, the Fulshear football team began playing at the varsity level.
