= John and Randolph Foster High School =

Public school in Texas, United States

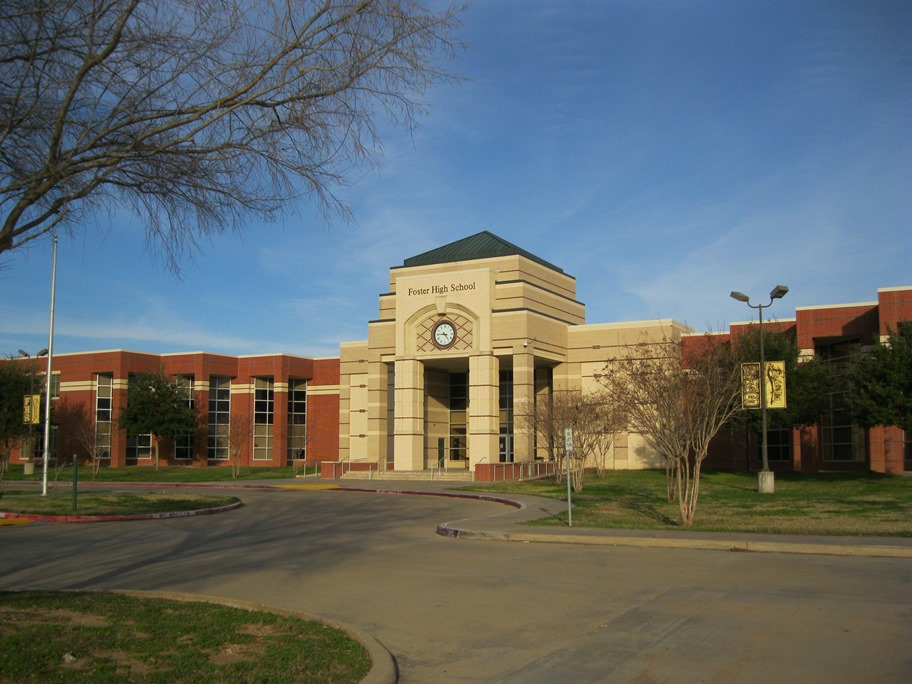

Location
- 4400 FM 723; Richmond, Texas address, 77406; United States; 29.62714°N 95.81012°W

Information
- Type: Public
- Established: 2001
- School district: Lamar Consolidated Independent School District
- Principal: Christopher Wood
- Staff: 121.12 (on an FTE basis)
- Grades: 9-12
- Student to teacher ratio: 21.29
- Campus size: 6A
- Campus type: Urban
- Colors: Black and gold
- Mascot: Falcons
- Website: fosterhs.lcisd.org

John and Randolph Foster High School is a secondary school located in unincorporated Fort Bend County, Texas, United States, north of Rosenberg.

The school is part of the Lamar Consolidated Independent School District. It opened in 2001, with the intent of relieving the student population at nearby B.F. Terry High School and Lamar Consolidated High School.

Foster serves: unincorporated areas of Fort Bend County, a small portion of Rosenberg, Pecan Grove, and the communities of Cumings, Foster, and Long Meadow Farms. It previously served Fulshear, Simonton, Weston Lakes, and Lakemont.

== Feeder schools ==
Lamar CISD calls this feeder system the "Gold Track." Feeder junior high and middle schools share the FHS colors and mascot.

=== Junior high school ===
- Briscoe Junior High School

=== Middle school ===
- Wertheimer Middle School

=== Elementary schools ===
- Carl Briscoe Bentley Elementary School
- Judge James C. Adolphus Elementary School
- Stephen F. Austin Elementary School
- Samuel Miles Frost Elementary School
- Jackson Elementary School

Either of these elementary schools are entirely zoned to Foster High School.

== Notable alumni ==
- Jacob Brammer (2017), CFL offensive lineman for the Saskatchewan Roughriders
- Reuben Fatheree II (2021), college football offensive tackle
- CeeDee Lamb (2017), NFL wide receiver for the Dallas Cowboys
- Joey Mbu (2011), football player
- Tyler Onyedim (2021), NFL defensive end for the Denver Broncos
- Javarris Williams (2004), former NFL running back for the Kansas City Chiefs
