= Simonton, Texas =

- City
- Location of Simonton, Texas
- Coordinates: 29°40′47″N 95°59′25″W
- Country: United States
- State: Texas
- County: Fort Bend

Area
  - Total: 2.37 sq mi (6.14 km^{2})
  - Land: 2.35 sq mi (6.09 km^{2})
  - Water: 0.019 sq mi (0.05 km^{2})
- Elevation: 115 ft (35 m)

Population (2020)
  - Total: 647
  - Density: 376.1/sq mi (145.22/km^{2})
- Time zone: UTC-6 (Central (CST))
  - Summer (DST): UTC-5 (CDT)
- ZIP code: 77476
- Area codes: 713/281/832/346/621
- FIPS code: 48-67964
- GNIS feature ID: 1347151
- Website: www.simontontexas.gov

Simonton is a city in Fort Bend County, Texas, United States, within the Houston–Pasadena–The Woodlands metropolitan area. Simonton is located at the intersection of Farm roads 1093 and 1489, approximately fourteen miles northwest of Richmond and five miles west of Fulshear. As of the 2020 U.S. census, the city population was 647, down from 814 at the 2010 census.

== History ==
=== The Simonton Plantation ===
The first event that shaped Simonton's history was when James Simonton and his brother Theophilus bought 4000 acres of land in northwestern Fort Bend County in the 1840s. The two Simonton brothers built a plantation next to the Brazos River, on which they raised cotton. The year 1850 is officially designated as the founding year for Simonton, since the 1850 US Census showed the two brothers, their mother, Mary, and Theophilus's wife and two sons residing on the property. Another brother, Joseph, and his family moved to the plantation in the 1850s. In 1857, Theophilus helped charter the Richmond Masonic Hall Association, symbolizing the elite status of the Simonton family in Fort Bend County. The town of Simonton joined Fulshear and Pittsville as the main rural towns in northwestern Fort Bend County.

=== American Civil War ===
At the onset of the Civil War, the 1860 US Census showed that the Simontons owned one of the largest and most prosperous plantations in Fort Bend County, with a real property value at $200,000 and personal property valued at $155,000. The Simonton brothers have been identified as among the largest slaveholders in Texas. According to the 1860 US census and a subsequent research, there were 105 slaves on the Simonton plantation on the eve of the Civil War. This census also revealed that their plantation had 975 improved acres that produced 11,000 bushels of corn and 600 bales of cotton. Like many Texas plantation owners, they supported the Confederacy.

On January 4, 1864, Joseph, James, and Theo Simonton wrote General J.B. Magruder that they were about to place in Confederate service about 40 [slaves].... The three brothers did not enlist in the Confederate army, but this donation of slaves to the Confederate cause was certainly a material contribution to the cause. After the war, on July 18, 1965 [sic], James Simoton [sic] signed an amnesty oath to the United States of America."

=== Post-Civil War Reconstruction ===
The plantation was broken up and sold after the war. Tracts of land were sold to incoming settlers. The Simontons actively resisted the post-Civil War Reconstruction efforts. During the Fort Bend Jaybird-Woodpecker political battles during post-Civil War Reconstruction, the Simonton brothers joined the Jaybirds, a faction within the Democratic Party, who wanted to oust the Woodpeckers, primarily blacks and their white allies, from the county administration. In October 1888 in nearby Pittsville, Theophilus Simonton Jr. was arrested by the county sheriff for fatally shooting a local black leader, Lamar Johnson, and injuring his half-brother, Taylor Randonan. This incident gained regional and national attention for the deep racial divisions of the Jaybird-Woodpecker War raging throughout Fort Bend County.

=== End of the Pioneer Era ===
The Simonton family's position and presence gradually dwindled after the deaths of the pioneer brothers and the influx of European immigrants who passed through Galveston during the late 19th and early 20th Century.

Theophilus Simonton died by February 2, 1867, the date on which his will was probated. Although he had lost his slaves by the time of his death, his estate was valued at $1,311,010, a considerable sum by the standards of Reconstruction Texas. James died before June 2, 1892, when his will was probated. His estate was valued at $9,014 at that time.

Their deaths accompanied by the industrial revolution that was sweeping the United States drastically altered the economic means, and thus the social and political roles, in Simonton as well as throughout Fort Bend Country.

According to oral history documentation, the Ku Klux Klan was present in Simonton from the early 20th Century, as they were in many Texas small towns, and were especially active due to the influx of foreign-born immigrants, who moved to Simonton to work as farm and ranch help for the local cattle ranches and pecan groves.

=== From Busy Town to Quiet Crossroads Community ===
The next event shaping Simonton history was the advent, around 1888, of the San Antonio and Aransas Pass Railroad. It is said the company wanted the track to run through Pittsville (near what is now Fulshear) where the terrain was more level. However, the landowners in that area refused to sell the railroad a right-of-way because they believed the trains would scare their cattle. The line was therefore laid across the hills and creeks between Fulshear and Simonton. Water was as necessary as coal for the steam-powered locomotives, and Simonton became one of the main watering stops. With the tracks, came the people. With the tracks also came the opportunity to ship the area's farm produce to other parts of the country.

In subsequent years, Simonton developed into a robust agricultural community. Snap shots of this history have been noted in several oral historical accounts:

- Red Potato Farming. In 1906, D.H. (Dave) Mullins, who came to Simonton from Kansas, began growing potatoes on a commercial scale – 150 acres that first year. Later he and J.R. Spencer, also from Kansas, working together, planted 1000 acres of red potatoes. Other farmers followed suit; and during one of the best years, 800 railroad cars of potatoes were shipped out of Simonton to places like Chicago, Kansas City, and Cincinnati. The Simonton area became one of the country's major producers of red potatoes. Gradually the red potato demand dwindled due to the onset of a disease and Luther Burbank's development of the white potato. In its place, alfalfa, cotton, pecans, and pure-bred cattle ranching replaced the acres of potatoes.
- Pure-bred Cattle Ranching. The Simonton-Fulshear-Brookshire became known as the "River Oaks of the pure-bred cattle business" and was tied in closely with the annual Houston Livestock Show. The pure-bred breeders in the community included the Diamond C Ranch (Herefords), Pecan Acres (Brahman cattle), Figure 4 Ranch (Charolais, Brahman, and Charbray), and the Bar C Ranch (Brahman, Charbray, and Charolais).
- Prison farm. From 1898 to 1909, Simonton was the site of a prison farm. A Captain South was in charge of convicts who cleared the land from Simonton to the Brazos River for farming of ribbon cane for syrup. Until very recently, a barn used by these convicts as a mess hall, bars still on the windows, stood near the Simonton crossroads.
- Busy Town. During the years that agriculture output was important, Simonton developed a busy "downtown". There were as many as three general stores. One, owned by A.A. (Tom) Mullins, offered a hotel on the second floor with potato buyers and railroad men as regular guests. Another hotel located in the Scruggs home, was run by a Mrs. Bentley, whose culinary skills made Simonton a favored meal stop for travelers. There was also a blacksmith shop, two cotton gins, a lumber yard, a post office and the railroad depot.
- Education. In 1893, the first school for white students was established in Simonton. A census of eligible school children taken in 1911 revealed 544 students. In 1925, noted Houston architect Louis Glover designed this two-story school for nine grades. The art deco-style building which exists today has a "stuccoed brick symmetrical façade with porticoes, grouped windows and ornamentation tiles." In subsequent years in the Great Depression, the facility was used to host dances, suppers, elections, and church services, The school was annexed into the Lamar Consolidated ISD in 1950. The school for black students was also established.
- H. Berkman & Co. General Store. It was built by Hyman "Harry" Berkman, who came to Simonton from Poland in 1913, during the agricultural boom in Simonton in the early 20th century. The store contained the post office, the general store, and butcher shop. Maurice and Flo Berkman (married June 24, 1956), who were members of the now defunct Jewish synagogue in Warton, Texas, operated store for more than 62 years until their retirement and subsequent move to Houston.
- Dwindling Population. As agricultural output declined and railroad traffic dwindled, people started moving away, mostly to Houston with its growing industry and higher wages. The depot closed in 1953; and it wasn't long before the last cotton gin closed down. Eventually, what was left was a small café, a pecan barn, the post office, a small liquor store and Berkman's general store.

Gradually by 1957, Simonton had changed from a busy small town to a quiet crossroads community. Then came the beginnings of a new stage in the life of the town. Vernon Evans, owner of the nearby Rue Ranch, and his son-in-law, A.E. "Snake" Bailey, bought 850 acres of land along FM 1093 to be developed as a western community with stables and a small arena and club house, the hub around which houses would be built. The development was called Valley Lodge. Valley Lodge subdivision was the first subdivision out of the city of Houston within commuting distance.

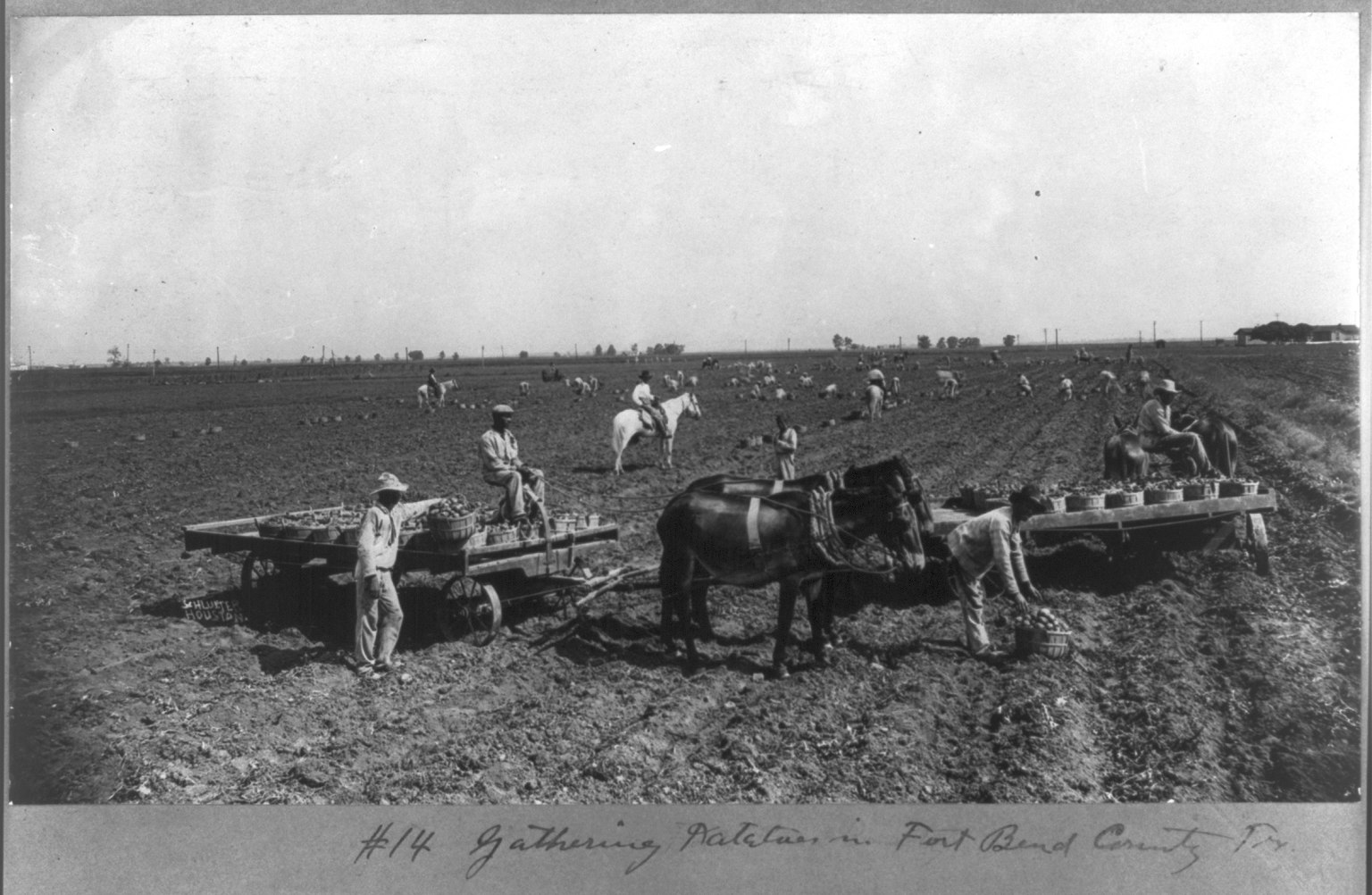
Harvesting potatoes in Fort Bend County, Tx

=== International VIP – Chinese Vice Premier Deng Xiaoping's 1979 Visit to the Simonton Rodeo ===
In the months following the Sino-US normalization, China's Vice Premier Deng Xiaoping visited the United States for nine days in 1979, visiting Washington, Atlanta, Houston and Seattle. On February 2 during his visit to Houston, he spent an evening in Simonton at the Roundup Rodeo. In 1963 the Round Up was built on FM 1093. Also the brainchild of "Snake" Bailey, it is a large indoor rodeo arena in full swing every Saturday night, drawing people from Houston and elsewhere for a taste of the "real west." He rode in a stagecoach, and later a barrel racer gave the premier a cowboy-style duster and a ten-gallon hat, both of which he donned and displayed before the crowd.

Deng's visit to the Simonton rodeo is considered to be the tipping point in the thaw of US-China relations.

The Simonton Rodeo closed by 1997 when it was bought and restored by Benchmark Wireline, an oil services company. A China Daily Global video captures the memories of this visit, including Katie Van Dries whose father Luke owned the rodeo at that time.

The photographs of Deng in the cowboy hat appeared in American newspapers, displaying a distinctly human side to a previously mysterious Chinese leader. As Ezra F. Vogel, a biographer of Deng, put it, the

"photograph of Deng smiling beneath his ten-gallon hat became the symbol of his visit. It signaled to the U.S. public that he was not only good-humored, but, after all, less like one of 'those Communists' and more like 'us.'" With live broadcasts back to China, these events made news for Deng's home audience, too.

The Stetson hat is displayed in the National Museum of China in the center of the exhibit hall which focuses on Deng.

This excitement generated change Sino-American perceptions of each other, as exemplified in a Chinese Foreign Ministry video "The Cowboy-Hat and "Deng Whirlwind — The First Visit to the United States by a Leader of New China."

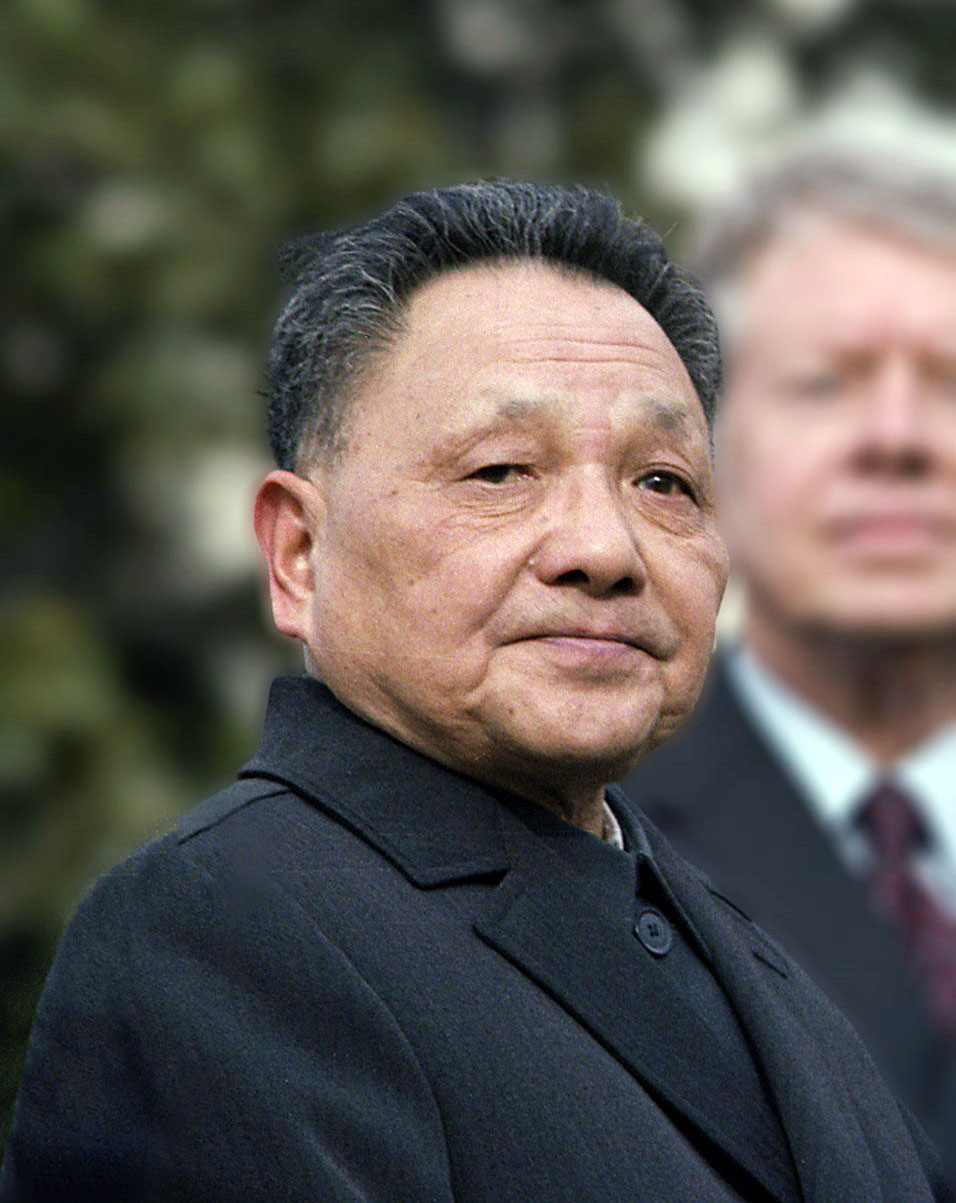
Deng Xiaoping at the onset of his visit to the United States in 1979.

=== City Incorporated ===
In 1979, the community incorporated as the City of Simonton. The population grew to 603 in 1980 and 718 in 2000. In 2010 the population was 814.

== Geography ==
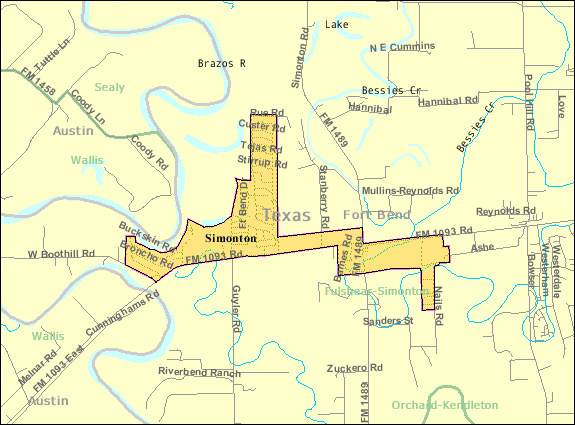
Simonton, Texas

Simonton is located in northwestern Fort Bend County at 29°40′47″N 95°59′25″W (29.679783, –95.990302). The center of town is 2 miles (3 km) east of the Brazos River and 16 miles (26 km) northwest of Rosenberg. Downtown Houston is 38 miles (61 km) to the east. According to the United States Census Bureau, Simonton has a total area of 2.0 square miles (5.2 km^{2}), of which 0.004 square miles (0.01 km^{2}), or 0.24%, is water.

Almost all of the City is located within the Federal Emergency Management Agency (FEMA) 100-year floodplain of the Brazos River. See the FEMA Preliminary Map 2017.1.30 panel 80 and FEMA Preliminary Map 2017.1.30 panel 90. Real-time river gauges for the Brazos River are available here.

Simonton has been plagued by repeated flooding due to being located one mile east of the Brazos River, and it considered to located in the 100-year floodplain of the Brazos River. The most significant Brazos River flooding recorded were:

- 1913 Major Flood.
- October 1991 with 100 homes flooded
- December 1995 with 125 homes flooded and caused approximately $2.5 million dollars damage
- May 2016 when cows became stranded.
- August 2017 as a result of Hurricane Harvey.

While plagued by flooding, the City of Simonton purchased two drainage pumps for $95,000 that has reduced the impact of the Brazos River flooding. These pumps were partly paid for by a grant from the Federal Emergency Management Agency's Hazard Mitigation Grant Program (HMGP).

== Demographics ==
=== Racial and ethnic composition ===
Simonton city, Texas – Racial and ethnic composition Note: the US Census treats Hispanic/Latino as an ethnic category. This table excludes Latinos from the racial categories and assigns them to a separate category. Hispanics/Latinos may be of any race.
Race / Ethnicity (NH = Non-Hispanic)	Pop 2000	Pop 2010	Pop 2020	% 2000	% 2010	% 2020
White alone (NH)	630	655	406	87.74%	80.47%	62.75%
Black or African American alone (NH)	36	61	32	5.01%	7.49%	4.95%
Native American or Alaska Native alone (NH)	0	4	1	0.00%	0.49%	0.15%
Asian alone (NH)	2	12	8	0.28%	1.47%	1.24%
Native Hawaiian or Pacific Islander alone (NH)	1	0	0	0.14%	0.00%	0.00%
Other race alone (NH)	0	4	14	0.00%	0.49%	2.16%
Mixed race or Multiracial (NH)	5	11	33	0.70%	1.35%	5.10%
Hispanic or Latino (any race)	44	67	153	6.13%	8.23%	23.65%
Total	718	814	647	100.00%	100.00%	100.00%

=== 2020 census ===
As of the 2020 census, Simonton had a population of 647, 230 households, and 188 families residing in the city. The median age was 41.3 years, with 22.7% of residents under the age of 18 and 18.1% 65 years of age or older. For every 100 females there were 112.8 males, and for every 100 females age 18 and over there were 109.2 males age 18 and over.

0.0% of residents lived in urban areas, while 100.0% lived in rural areas.

There were 230 households in Simonton, of which 38.7% had children under the age of 18 living in them. Of all households, 64.8% were married-couple households, 13.5% were households with a male householder and no spouse or partner present, and 15.7% were households with a female householder and no spouse or partner present. About 14.4% of all households were made up of individuals and 5.7% had someone living alone who was 65 years of age or older.

There were 274 housing units, of which 16.1% were vacant. The homeowner vacancy rate was 7.5% and the rental vacancy rate was 7.7%.

Racial composition as of the 2020 census
Race	Number	Percent
White	453	70.0%
Black or African American	36	5.6%
American Indian and Alaska Native	2	0.3%
Asian	9	1.4%
Native Hawaiian and Other Pacific Islander	0	0.0%
Some other race	63	9.7%
Two or more races	84	13.0%
Hispanic or Latino (of any race)	153	23.6%

=== 2000 Census ===
As of the census of 2000, there were 718 people, 264 households, and 206 families residing in the city. The population density was 354.4 inhabitants per square mile (136.8/km^{2}). There were 282 housing units at an average density of 139.2 per square mile (53.7/km^{2}). The racial makeup of the city was 91.64% White, 5.01% African American, 0.28% Asian, 0.14% Pacific Islander, 1.95% from other races, and 0.97% from two or more races. Hispanic or Latino of any race were 6.13% of the population.

There were 264 households, out of which 34.8% had children under the age of 18 living with them, 71.6% were married couples living together, 3.8% had a female householder with no husband present, and 21.6% were non-families. 18.6% of all households were made up of individuals, and 7.6% had someone living alone who was 65 years of age or older. The average household size was 2.72 and the average family size was 3.07.

The city population is evenly spread: 25.9% is under the age of 18, 4.7% is between 18 and 24, 29.0% is from 25 to 44, 30.4% from 45 to 64, and 10.0% who were 65 years of age or older. The median age was 41 years. For every 100 females, there were 102.8 males. For every 100 females age 18 and over, there were 96.3 males.

The median income for a household in the city was $72,833, and the median income for a family was $81,905. Males had a median income of $51,842 versus $30,333 for females. The per capita income for the city was $30,669. About 2.5% of families and 5.3% of the population were below the poverty line, including 7.9% of those under age 18 and 5.8% of those age 65 or over.

== Government and infrastructure ==
Fort Bend County does not have a hospital district. OakBend Medical Center serves as the county's charity hospital which the county contracts with.

=== Mayor and Council members ===
Name	Title	Term
Laurie Boudreaux	Mayor	May 2018 – May 2020
Jake Davis	Council-at-Large	May 2018 – May 2020
Stacey Gootee	Mayor Pro Tem	May 2019 – May 2021
Shae Butts	Council-at-Large	May 2018 – May 2020
Thomas McLemore	Council-at-Large	May 2019 – May 2021
Stephan Sear	Council-at-Large	May 2019 – May 2021

=== US Post Office ===
The United States Postal Service operates the Simonton Post Office at 35608 Farm to Market Road 1093.

=== Public Library ===
Fulshear's Bob Lutts Fulshear/Simonton Branch Library, located in Fulshear, is a part of the Fort Bend County Libraries system. The branch, which opened in May 1998, was the third branch built with 1989 bond funds. The land currently occupied by the library was previously the Fort Bend County Precinct 4 headquarters. Bob Lutts, the precinct commissioner, offered the land to the library system. The Fulshear City Council asked the county to name the library after Lutts. The library is now within Precinct 3.

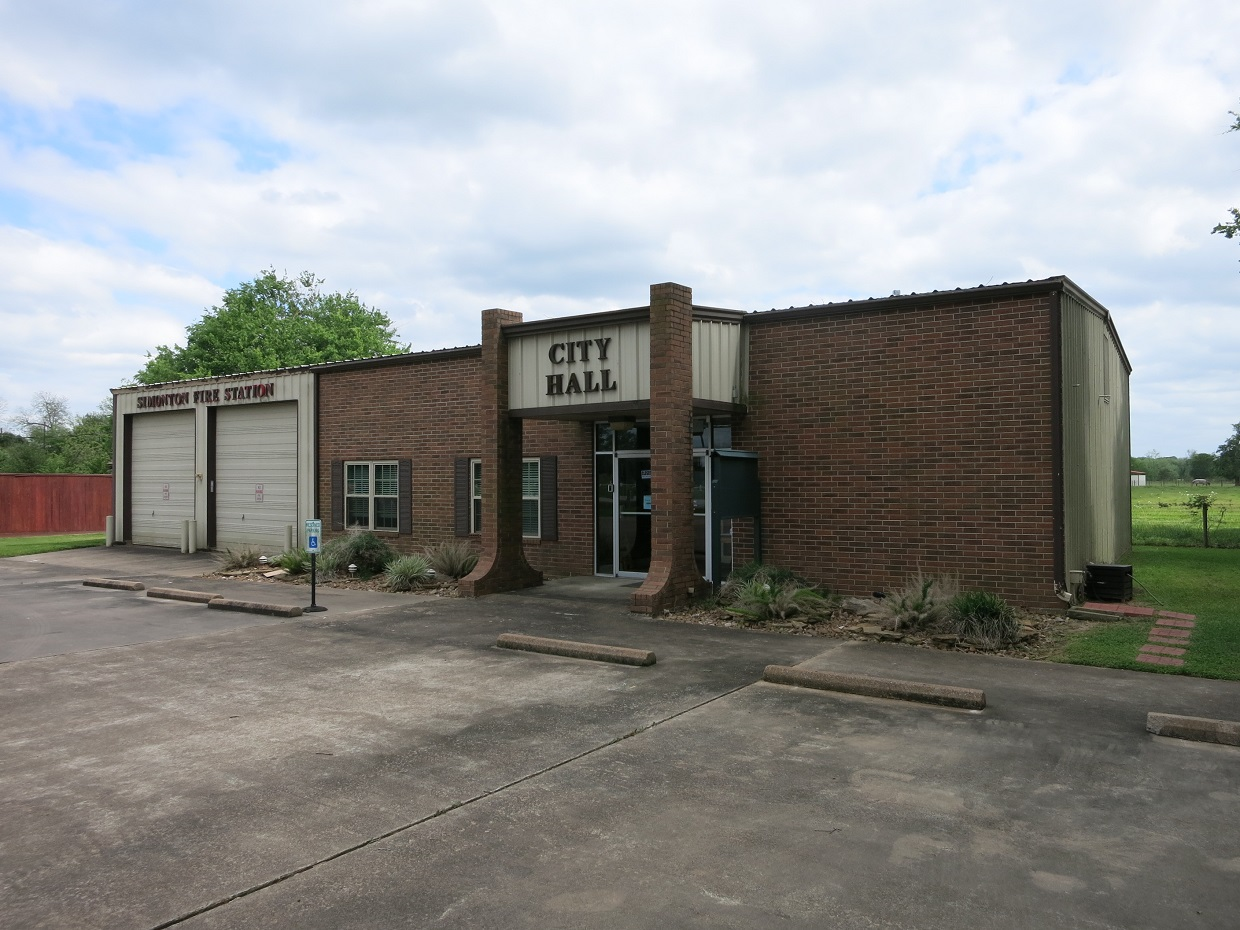
Simonton City Hall and Fire Station on FM 1093

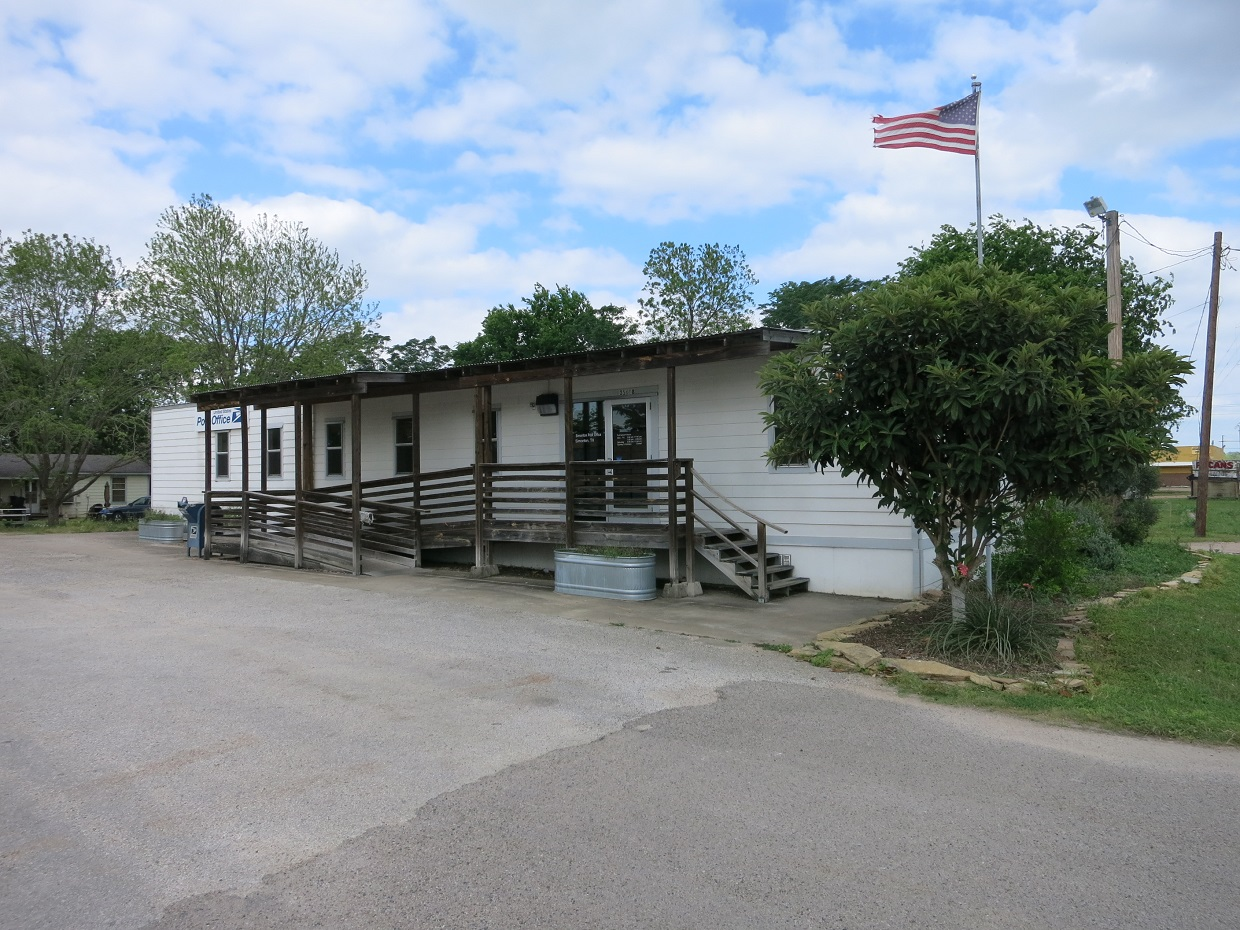
US Post Office on FM 1093

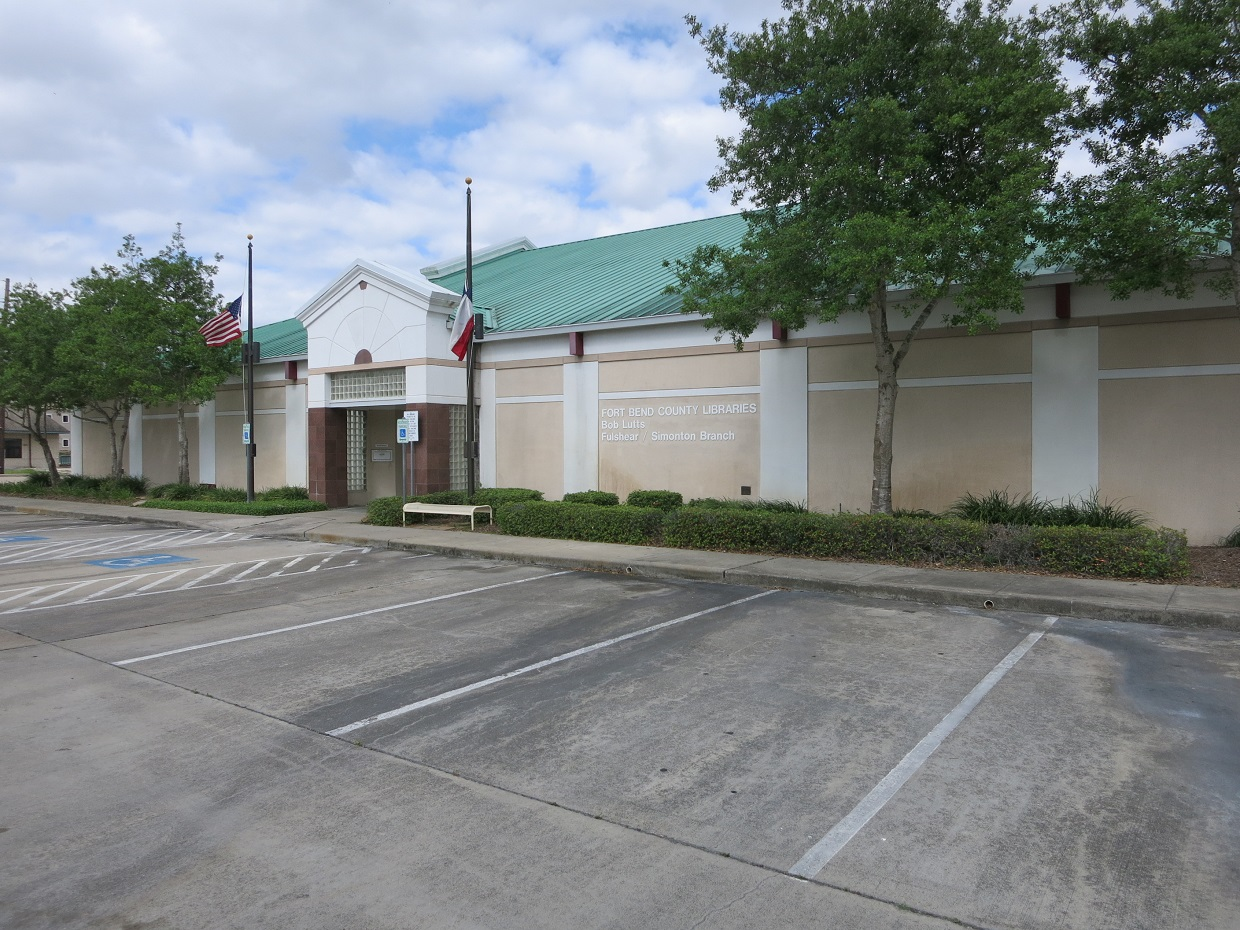
Bob Lutts Library on FM 359 in Fulshear

== Education ==
Simonton is zoned to schools in the Lamar Consolidated Independent School District.

Current zoned schools

- Huggins Elementary School (Fulshear)
- Leaman Junior High School (Fulshear)
- Fulshear High School (Fulshear)

Previous zoned schools

- Foster High School (Richmond postal address)
- Briscoe Junior High School (Richmond postal address)

Private schools

- Simonton Christian Academy (Simonton)

The designated community college for LCISD is Wharton County Junior College.

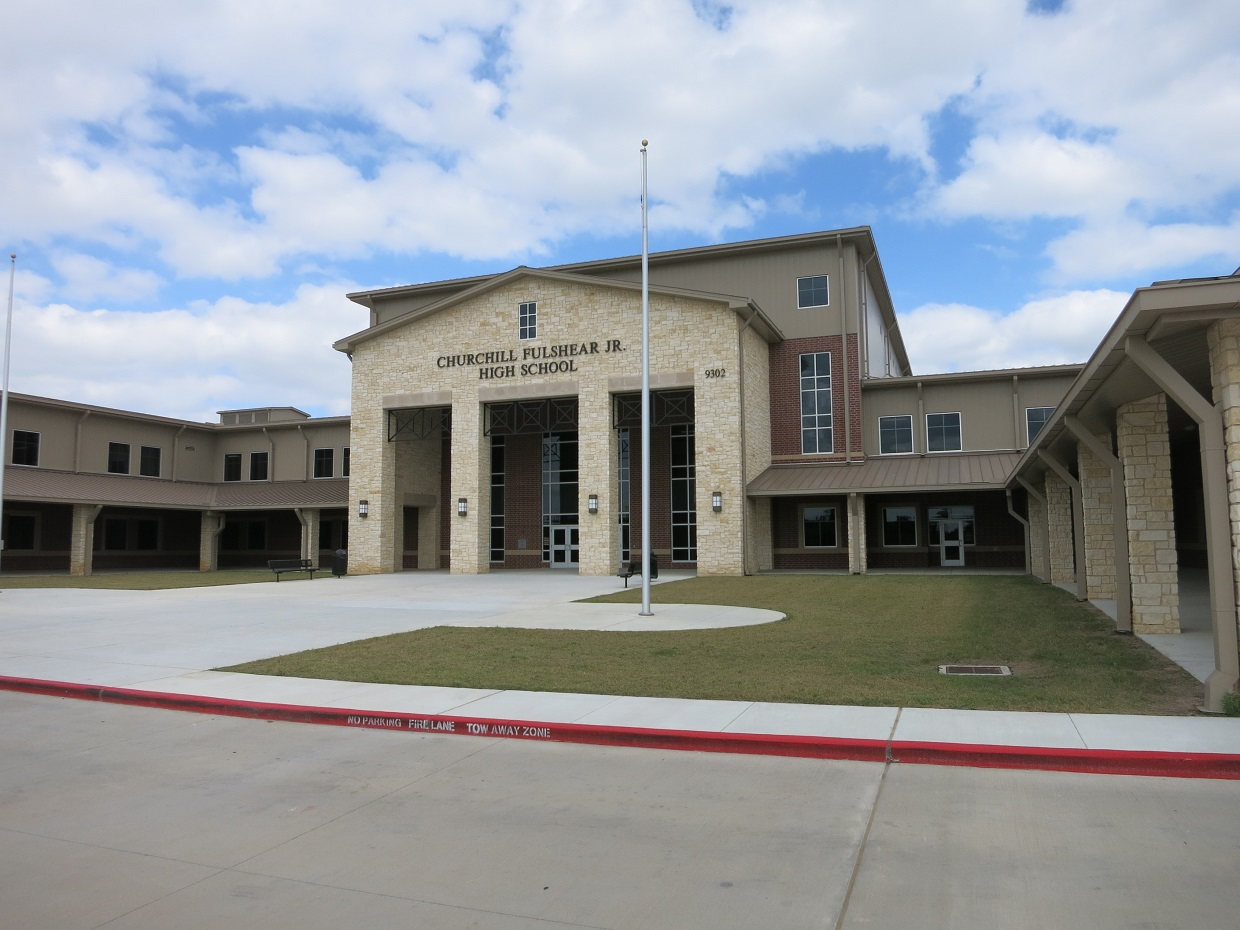
Churchill Fulshear High School

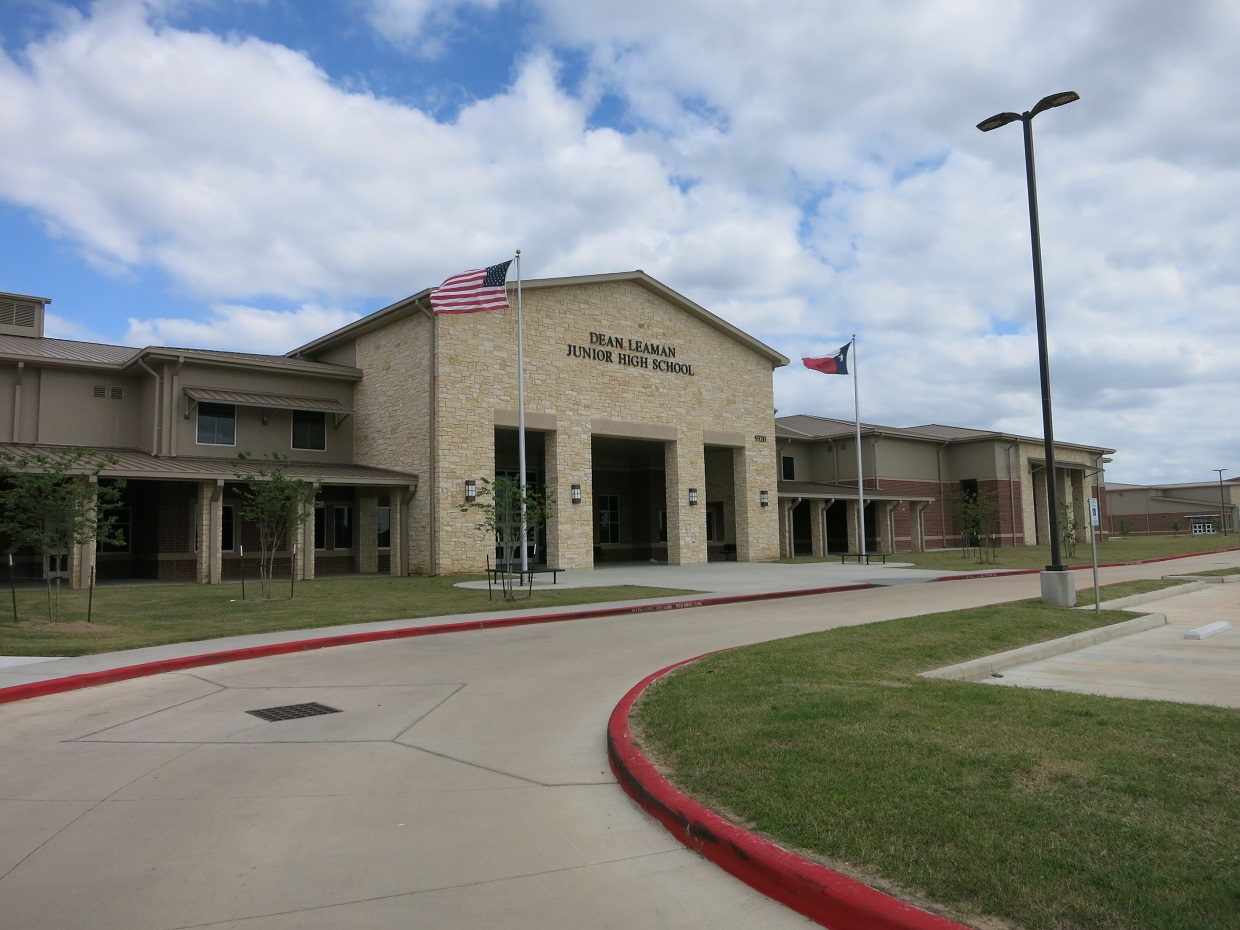
Dean Leaman Junior High School

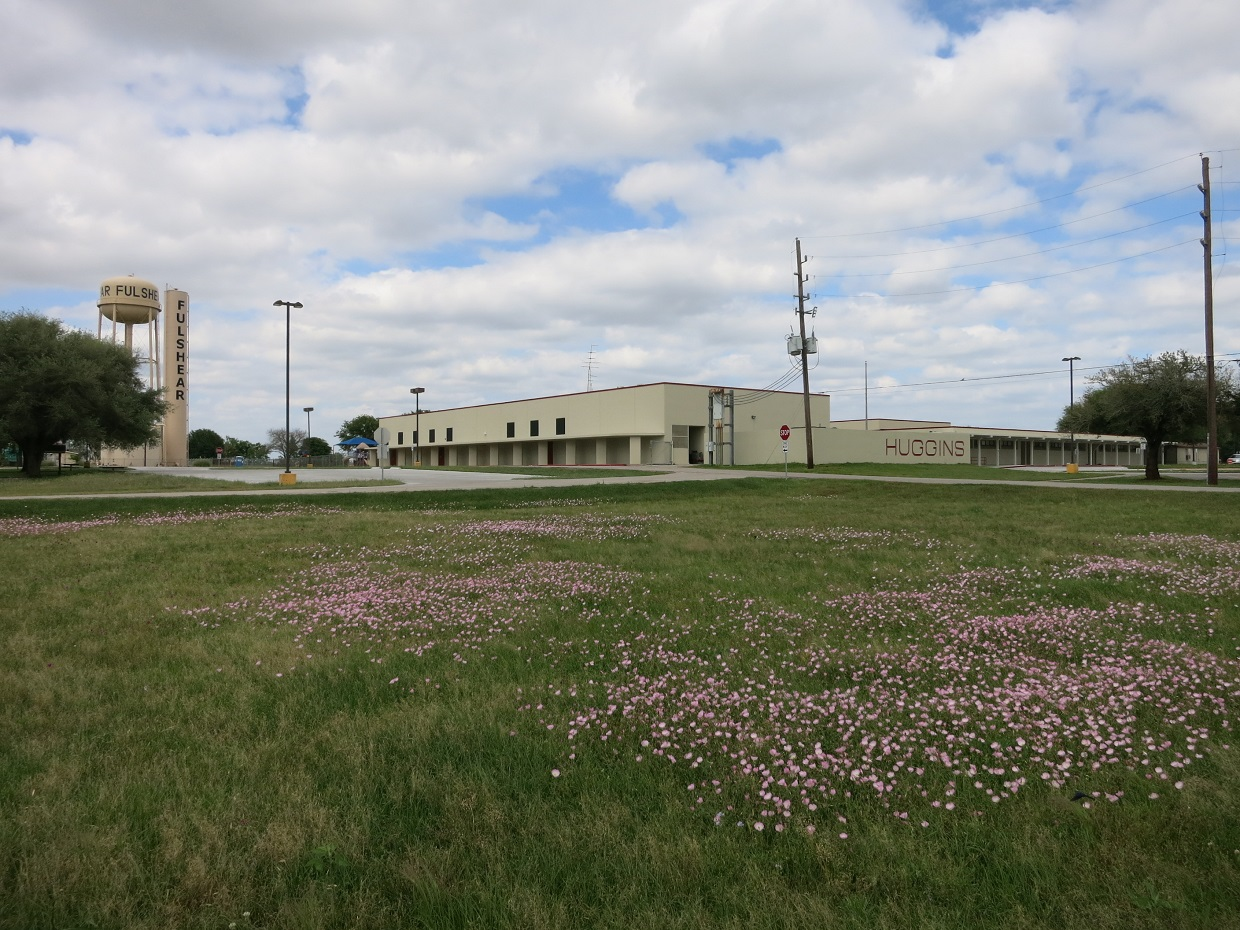
Huggins Elementary School

== Media ==
Simonton is one of the key towns featured in the 2009 documentary "The Heart of Texas Movie"

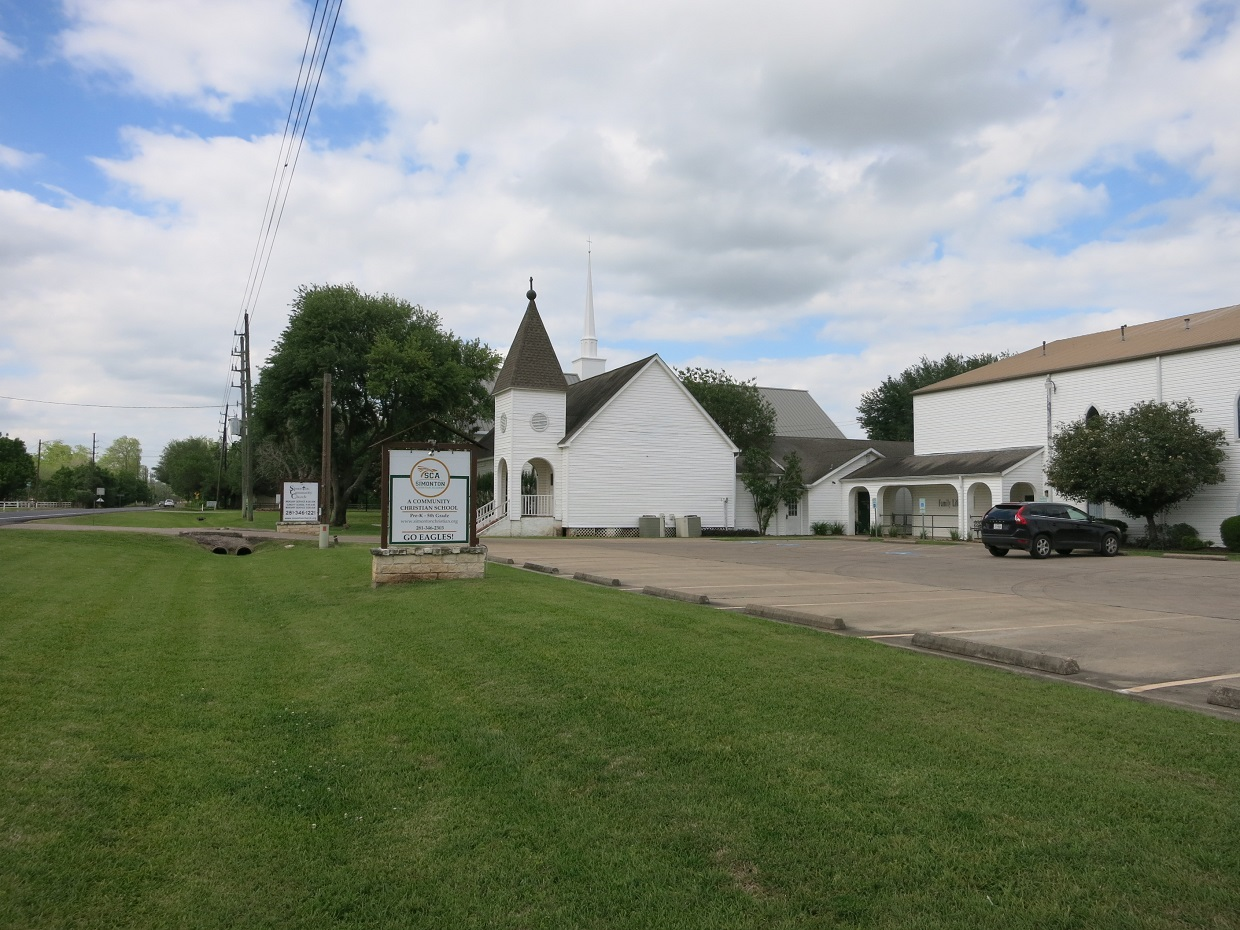
Simonton Community Church on FM 1489 south

== Notable person ==
- Dobie Gray, singer
