= Fulshear, Texas =

- City
- Motto: "Fort Bend County's Premier Address"
- Location of Fulshear, Texas
- Coordinates: 29°41′24″N 95°53′59″W
- Country: United States
- State: Texas
- County: Fort Bend
- Established: July 16, 1824
- Incorporated: 1977

Government
  - Mayor: Don McCoy

Area
  - Total: 12.957 sq mi (33.558 km^{2})
  - Land: 12.871 sq mi (33.337 km^{2})
  - Water: 0.086 sq mi (0.224 km^{2})
- Elevation: 130 ft (40 m)

Population (2020)
  - Total: 16,856
  - Estimate (2025): 64,630
  - Rank: US: 950th TX: 70th
  - Density: 3,310/sq mi (1,278/km^{2})
- Time zone: UTC–6 (Central (CST))
  - Summer (DST): UTC–5 (CDT)
- ZIP Codes: 77406, 77423, 77441, 77471, 77494
- Area codes: 713, 281, 832, and 346
- FIPS code: 48-27876
- GNIS feature ID: 1336299
- Sales tax: 8.25%
- Website: fulsheartexas.gov

Fulshear (/ˈfʊlʃər/ FUUL-shər) is a city in northwestern Fort Bend County, Texas, United States, and is located on the western edge of the Houston–Pasadena–The Woodlands metropolitan area. The population was 16,856 as of the 2020 census, and according to 2025 census estimates, the city is estimated to have a population of 64,630.

== History ==
=== Before Texas Independence ===
The history of Fulshear is closely intertwined with the historical events leading up to Texas Independence and eventual statehood within the United States of America. The small agricultural community traces its origins to the arrival of Churchill Fulshear, one of Stephen F. Austin's original Old Three Hundred. He moved from Tennessee to Texas in the summer of 1824 with his wife, Betsy Summers, daughter, Mary, and three sons, Benjamin, Graves, and Churchill Fulshear, Jr.

As a man with considerable wealth and property, Churchill Fulshear Sr. obtained on July 16, 1824, a land grant from the Mexican government and Stephen F. Austin that allowed him and his family to settle in Austin's colony. He established a slave plantation that raised cotton, corn, rice, pecans and livestock. Churchill Fulshear Sr. died on January 18, 1831, with the plantation ownership passed onto his youngest son, Churchill Fulshear Jr., who added a cotton gin and flour mill which flourished well into the late 1880s.

During the Texas Revolution, Churchill Jr. and his two brothers, Graves and Benjamin, served as scouts for the Texan army as the Mexican army under the command of Antonio Lopez de Santa Anna pursued Sam Houston's army and civilians who fled after Santa Anna's victory at the 1836 Battle of the Alamo. The Fulshear area was on the route of both the Mexicans and the Texan soldiers. Churchill and his brothers scouted Santa Anna's army as they crossed the Brazos River near their plantation on April 14, 1836.

According to one account, the Texan army trying to prevent Santa Anna and the Mexican army from crossing the Brazos River camped on the Fulshear plantation. They retreated when they learned that:

1,500 Mexican soldiers had crossed nearby at Thompson's Ferry, they, too, had to retreat. Randolph Foster was one of the Old 300 settlers whose plantation was in the John Foster grant that lay between what is now FM 359 and FM 723 just south of Fulshear. He was a member of Martin's Company and, from William Harris Wharton's account, we ascertain that the Company "camped on the night of the 11th at Churchill Fulshear's." Churchill Fulshear's plantation lay on the north side of the Brazos River in what is now Fulshear township.

=== Texas Independence to the early 20th century ===
In the years after Texas Independence, Churchill Jr. expanded the plantation and commercial interests. This included a horse race track called "Churchill Downs" (not the same as the present-day Churchill Downs, which is in Kentucky) that he operated during the 1850s to 1870s in Pittsville, located several miles north of Fulsher. One of the most famous horses bred by Churchill Jr. was "Get-A-Way" (known as "Old Get"), which raced on numerous tracks throughout the United States and Europe. He also actively sold and purchased real estate, including the 654 acres sold to John Randon on May 10, 1844, for $4,000.

The old tombstones in the Fulshear Cemetery (previously called Union Chapel Cemetery Grounds) identify the names of some of the original pioneers who settled the Fulshear area: Andrews, Avery, Avis, Bains, Bond, Boone, Brasell, Bulwinkel, Cooper, Davis, Dozier, Edmonson, Everett, Gibson, Foster, Harris, Holmes, Hoskins, Huggins, Hunter, Jager, Kemp, Lovelace, Mayes, McElwee, McJunkin, McLeod, Miller, Nesbitt, Parker, Patton, Quinn, Rowles, Sass, Shieve, Sheriff, Simonton, Sparks, Thompson, Utley, Wade, Walker, Wilson, Wimberly, and Winner.

Mention must be made of several men who made outstanding contributions to the Fulshear community and who are buried in this cemetery. They are: (l) Randolph Foster - an "Old 300" Settler of the area, (2) Rev. John Patton - the first Methodist Minister connected to Union Chappel, and (3) Dr. Robert Locke Harris - a Confederate War Surgeon who visited after the War in 1865 and remained to become a prominent doctor of the area.

A significant historical development occurred in 1888 when Churchill Jr. granted the San Antonio and Aransas Pass (SA & AP) Railroad (SA&AP) the right of way through his plantation. The town of Fulshear grew around the railroad in the 1890s, a period that also saw the demise of other local communities which, like Pittsville, had rejected the SA & AP Railroad the right of way on their lands.

Churchill Fulshear Jr. died in 1892. In the same year, the Southern Pacific Railroad gained ownership of the SA & AP Railroad. In the decades following, the town established a public school district (1893), a Methodist church (1894) and business establishments that included a barber shop, doctor, drug store, blacksmith, saloon, hotel, and post office.

A Texas Historical Marker located in downtown Fulshear succinctly summarizes its 19th Century history:

On July 16, 1824, land grant of Mexico to Churchill Fulshear, one of the "Old 300" settlers of Stephen F. Austin, father of Texas. Churchill Fulshear, Jr., veteran of Texas War for Independence, built 4-story brick mansion in the 1850s, bred and raced horses at Churchill Downs (at Pittsville, 2 mi. N). His pupil, John Huggins, won world fame by training first American horse to win the English Derby. Town platted here 1890 by San Antonio & Aransas Pass Railroad, soon was trade center, with many facilities. The Rev. J. H. Holt was first (1894) pastor of the still existent Methodist church.

=== American Civil War, slavery and sharecropping ===
While few historical records exist on the American Civil War and the people of Fulshear, there are accounts that local landowners, surgeons, and commercial business men actively supported and enrolled in the Confederate Army during the Civil War.

Two of the three active Fulshear cemeteries provide insights into the history of the non-white racial minorities. As was common practice prior to the Civil War, plantation owners like Churchill Fulshear would build separate cemeteries based on race. In addition to farm labor, "Churchill Fulshear's slaves were put to work making the bricks for the Fulshear plantation mansion, called Lake Hill." Since the mid-1800s, minority families were buried either in the Fulshear Black Cemetery or the Fulshear Spanish Cemetery, which were originally part of the Fulshear family plantation. This includes many of the black sharecroppers who worked the land after the end of slavery in the United States. A Texas Historical Marker here gives the historical information of the Black Cemetery:

Oral tradition says that this cemetery begin as a slave cemetery on the plantation of Tennessee native Churchill Fulshear. Many early burials are unmarked, and the oldest headstone is that of Rebecca Scott in 1915. In addition, midwives, a chef, a horse trainer and cowboy, the first colored school house founders, business men and women, two local entrepreneurs, religious leaders, and veterans from WWI to the Vietnam War are buried here. The rural landscape of the rolling hills and trees surrounding a variety of headstones made of fieldstone, granite, marble, steel, homemade concrete, wood and resin. The cemetery is evidence of the rich heritage of the people in this area. Historic Texas Cemetery - 2010

After the abolition of slavery with defeat of the Confederacy, many of the emancipated slaves became sharecroppers, which meant they rented land to farm it. Many grew cotton and potatoes, and supplemented their livelihood by raising chickens, eggs, and pigs as well as helping other farmers pick beans, potatoes, and peanuts. Many of these sharecroppers are buried in the Fulshear Black Cemetery. In 1995, Fulshear Mayor Viola Randle won a class-action lawsuit to legally define the Fulshear Black Cemetery as belonging to the Fulshear Black Cemetery Association and to prevent an attempt by a local property owner to restrict more burials in the cemetery.

The Spanish Cemetery, which was often referred to as the "Catholic Cemetery," is just south of the Fulshear Cemetery and has an estimated 300 grave sites.

Like elsewhere in Texas and the American South, the schools segregated based on race. The original "white-only" school house was built in 1893 and was expanded into a two-story building in 1912. The segregated school for Mexican students was located nearby. Two "black-only" school houses were built in rural areas several miles to the south and northwest of town. These Fulshear schools were merged into the Lamar Consolidated Independent School District in 1948.

=== Boom and bust, 1900s–1970s ===
By 1898 a thriving population of 250 residents supported eleven stores, three saloons, a school and a hotel. A block of businesses was destroyed by a fire in 1910 but the town recovered quickly and soon downtown consisted of several general stores, a drug store, a doctor's office, a post office, a millinery shop, three churches, an undertaker's supply store, a depot, a grist mill, a cotton gin, a blacksmith shop, a barber shop, six saloons, four schools, a boarding house, a hotel and a local telephone system. On Saturdays, when the local hands were paid, Fulshear was so busy that residents complained that the sidewalks were too crowded to walk on. The town had 300 residents and ten stores in 1929. But the population fell to 100 in 1933, around the time that the Fulshear plantation house was torn down. The Depression and a changed lifestyle caused residents to leave Fulshear. Fulshear did her share toward the war effort during WWII. Not only did she contribute men and women for the armed forces and war industries but an airplane lookout station was also manned daily on the roof of one of the brick buildings.

Fulshear remained a rural agricultural town with population ranging from 300 to 700 into the 1970s.

=== Incorporated city, 1977–present ===
The city was incorporated in 1977. The town served as a marketing center for locally produced rice, cotton, soybeans, corn, poultry, sorghum, pecan, horses and cattle. Growth in Fulshear exploded in the 2000s, due to its proximity to Houston. Circa 2008, the community had approximately 700 residents. In October 2013, the population rose to over 5,000. By that time, traffic was commonplace while historically it had not been. In May 2017, Fulshear was listed the richest small town in Texas on MSN.com.

== Geography ==
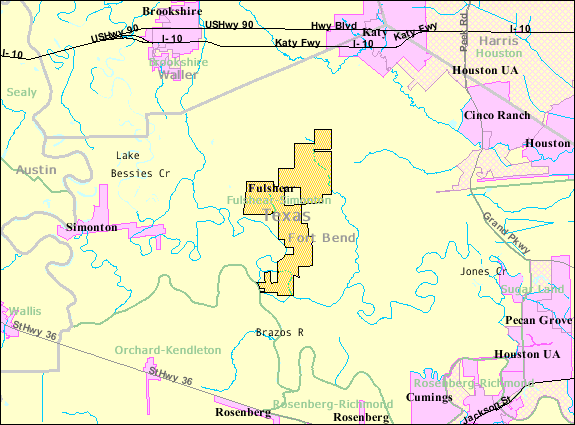
General Location Map of Fulshear

Fulshear is located in northwestern Fort Bend County at 29°41′24″N 95°53′59″W (29.6899563, -95.8996757), 60 miles inland from the Gulf of Mexico. It is located at the intersection of FM 359 and FM 1093. Downtown Houston is 33 miles (53 km) to the east, and Wallis is 15 miles (24 km) to the west. Interstate 10 at Brookshire is 7 miles (11 km) to the north.

According to the United States Census Bureau, the city has a total area of 12.957 square miles (33.56 km^{2}), of which 12.871 square miles (33.34 km^{2}) is land and 0.086 square miles (0.22 km^{2}) is water.

Fulshear has an extraterritorial jurisdiction (ETJ) of 37.11 square miles (96.1 km^{2}).

Sediments deposited over time by the Brazos River have created rich soil, enabling many native trees to grow in the area, including oak, cottonwood, ash, and pecan. The growing season is very long (296 days) thanks to the county's geographical proximity to the Gulf Coast, and temperatures are mild year-round. April, October and November are the most pleasant months in Fulshear; July and August are the least comfortable.

== Demographics ==
Historical population
Census	Pop.	Note	%±
1930	300		—
1940	100		−66.7%
1950	250		150.0%
1960	200		−20.0%
1970	349		74.5%
1980	594		70.2%
1990	557		−6.2%
2000	716		28.5%
2010	1,134		58.4%
2020	16,856		1,386.4%
2025 (est.)	64,630		283.4%
U.S. Decennial Census; Texas Almanac: 1850-2000; 2020 Census

=== Racial and ethnic composition ===
Fulshear, Texas – Racial and ethnic composition Note: the US Census treats Hispanic/Latino as an ethnic category. This table excludes Latinos from the racial categories and assigns them to a separate category. Hispanics/Latinos may be of any race.
Race / Ethnicity (NH = Non-Hispanic)	Pop 2000	Pop 2010	Pop 2020	% 2000	% 2010	% 2020
White alone (NH)	373	700	9,407	59.92%	61.5%	55.81%
Black or African American alone (NH)	169	179	1,061	24.02%	15.8%	6.29%
Native American or Alaska Native alone (NH)	0	21	24	0.00%	2.0%	0.14%
Asian alone (NH)	5	23	2,288	0.70%	2.0%	13.57%
Pacific Islander alone (NH)	0	0	1	0.00%	0.00%	0.00%
Other race alone (NH)	0	0	71	0.00%	0.00%	0.42%
Mixed race or Multiracial (NH)	8	14	684	1.54%	1.3%	4.06%
Hispanic or Latino (any race)	161	197	3,321	22.49%	17.4%	19.7%
Total	716	1,134	16,856	100.00%	100.00%	100.00%

=== 2020 census ===
As of the 2020 census, there were 16,856 people, 4,990 households, and 4,482 families residing in the city.

The median age was 35.6 years. 36.2% of residents were under the age of 18 and 7.0% of residents were 65 years of age or older. For every 100 females there were 98.9 males, and for every 100 females age 18 and over there were 95.7 males age 18 and over.

94.6% of residents lived in urban areas, while 5.4% lived in rural areas.

There were 4,990 households in Fulshear, of which 62.7% had children under the age of 18 living in them. Of all households, 80.6% were married-couple households, 7.0% were households with a male householder and no spouse or partner present, and 10.1% were households with a female householder and no spouse or partner present. About 8.6% of all households were made up of individuals and 2.9% had someone living alone who was 65 years of age or older.

There were 5,353 housing units, of which 6.8% were vacant. The homeowner vacancy rate was 4.1% and the rental vacancy rate was 9.1%.

Racial composition as of the 2020 census
Race	Number	Percent
White	10,026	59.5%
Black or African American	1,076	6.4%
American Indian and Alaska Native	35	0.2%
Asian	2,300	13.6%
Native Hawaiian and Other Pacific Islander	1	0.0%
Some other race	811	4.8%
Two or more races	2,607	15.5%
Hispanic or Latino (of any race)	3,321	19.7%

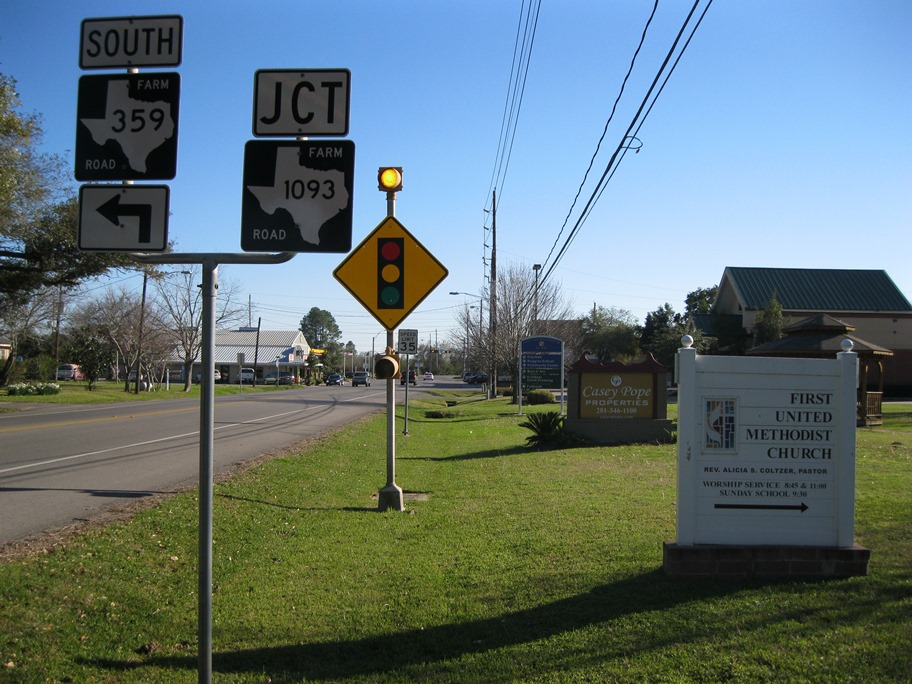
View south on FM 359 toward signal at FM 1093

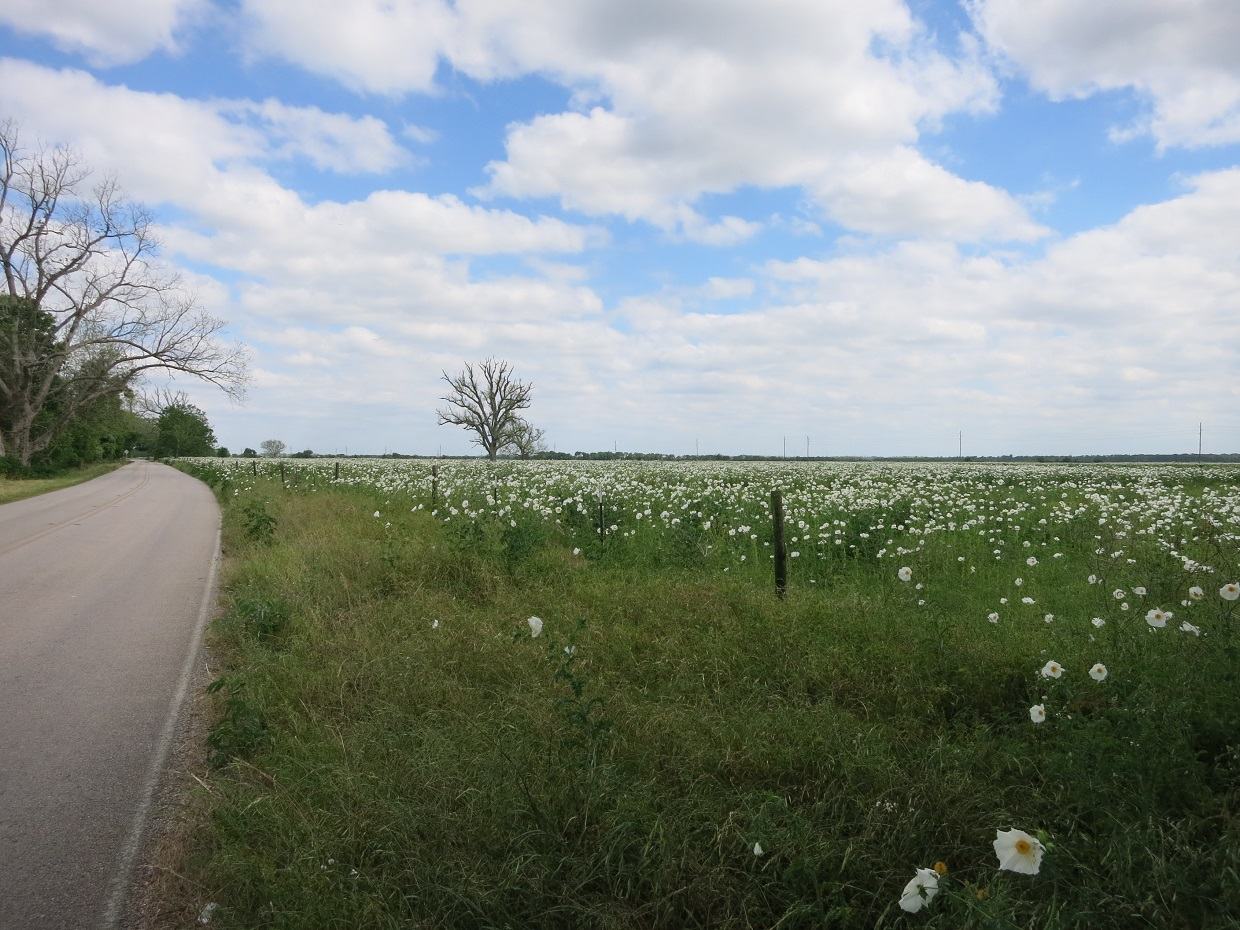
Wildflowers on Winner-Foster Road south of Fulshear

== Government and infrastructure ==
Fulshear is incorporated as a general law city. As of 2015 the taxation rate is 0.161631% per $100 valuation. Of the taxation rates in Fort Bend County, Fulshear's is among the lowest.

Mayor Don McCoy was elected mayor in 2024 and has also served as President of the Fulshear Regional Chamber of Commerce since its inception in 2013.

Office	Office Holder
Mayor	Donald McCoy
Mayor Pro Tem & District 4	Joel M. Patterson
At-large Position 1	Kent Pool
At-large Position 2	Jason Knape
District 1	Sarah Johnson
District 2	Patrick Powers
District 3	Christina Baron
District 5	Abhi Utturkar

Fort Bend County does not have a hospital district. OakBend Medical Center serves as the county's charity hospital which the county contracts with.

=== Postal service ===
The United States Postal Service operates the Fulshear Post Office at 8055 Farm to Market Road 359 South.

=== Public libraries ===
Fulshear's Bob Lutts Fulshear/Simonton Branch Library is a part of the Fort Bend County Libraries system. The branch, which opened in May 1998, was the third branch built with 1989 bond funds. The land currently occupied by the library was previously the Fort Bend County Precinct 4 headquarters. Bob Lutts, the precinct commissioner, offered the land to the library system. The Fulshear City Council asked the county to name the library after Lutts. The library is now within Precinct 3.

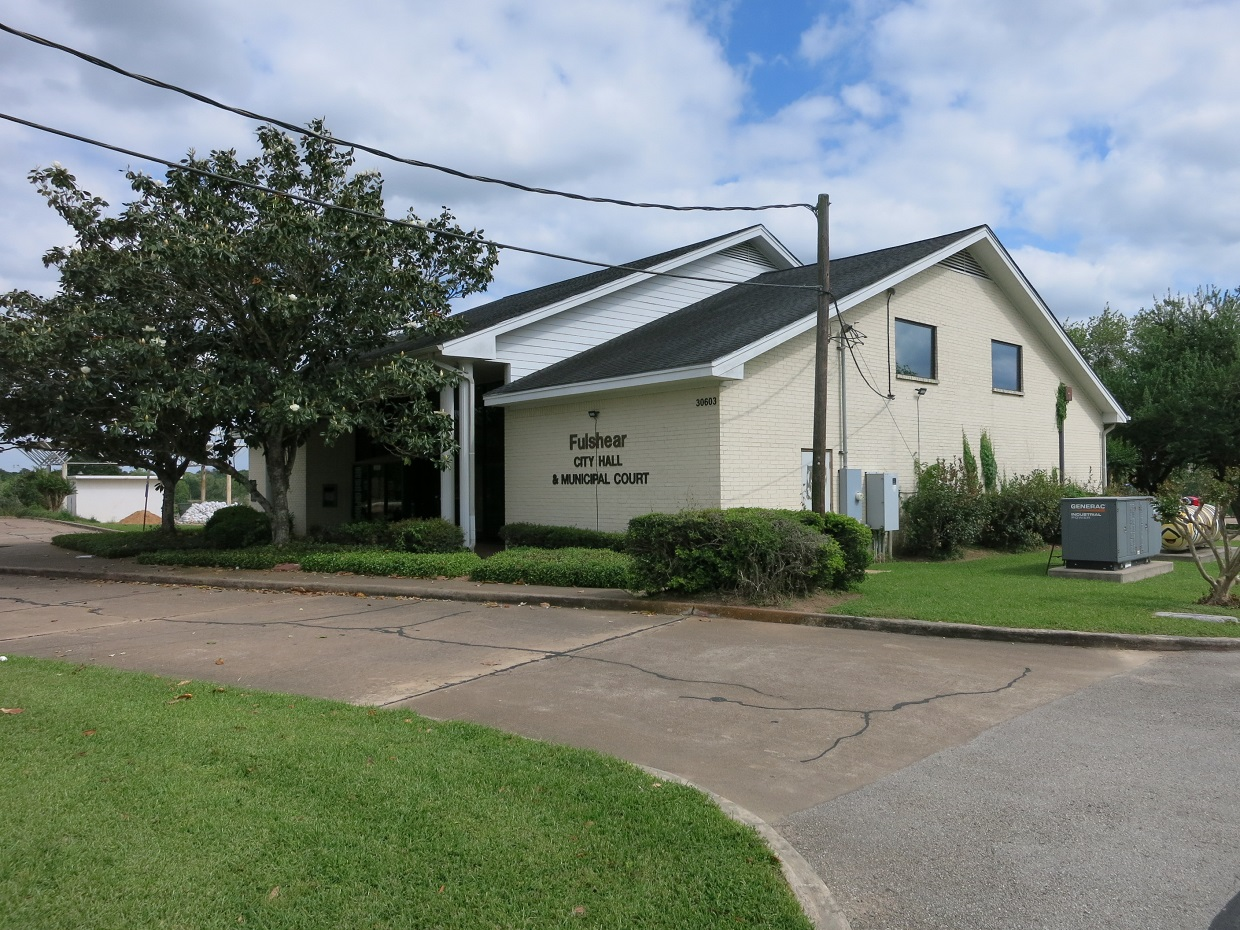
Fulshear City Hall on FM 1093

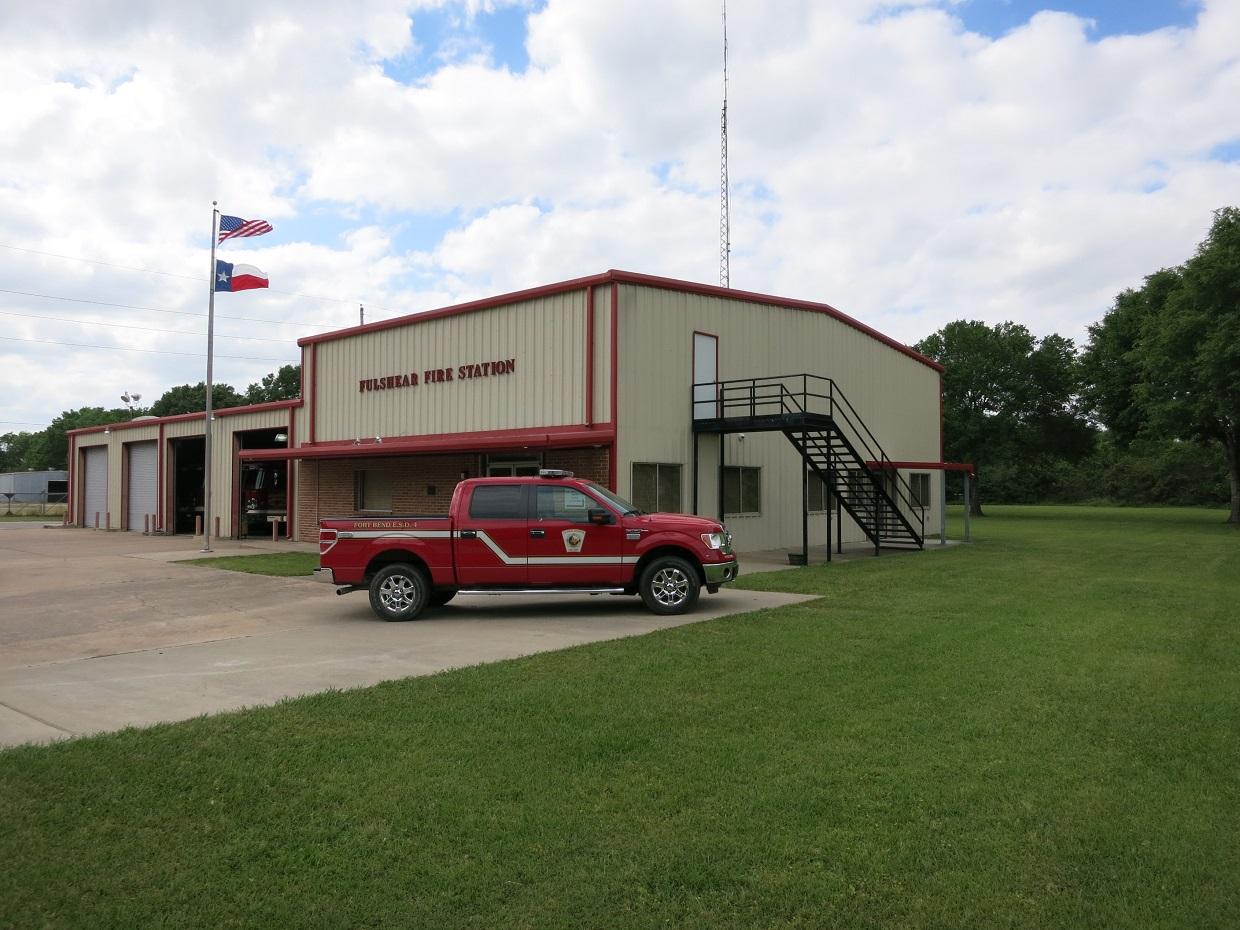
Fire Station No. 1 on 5th Street

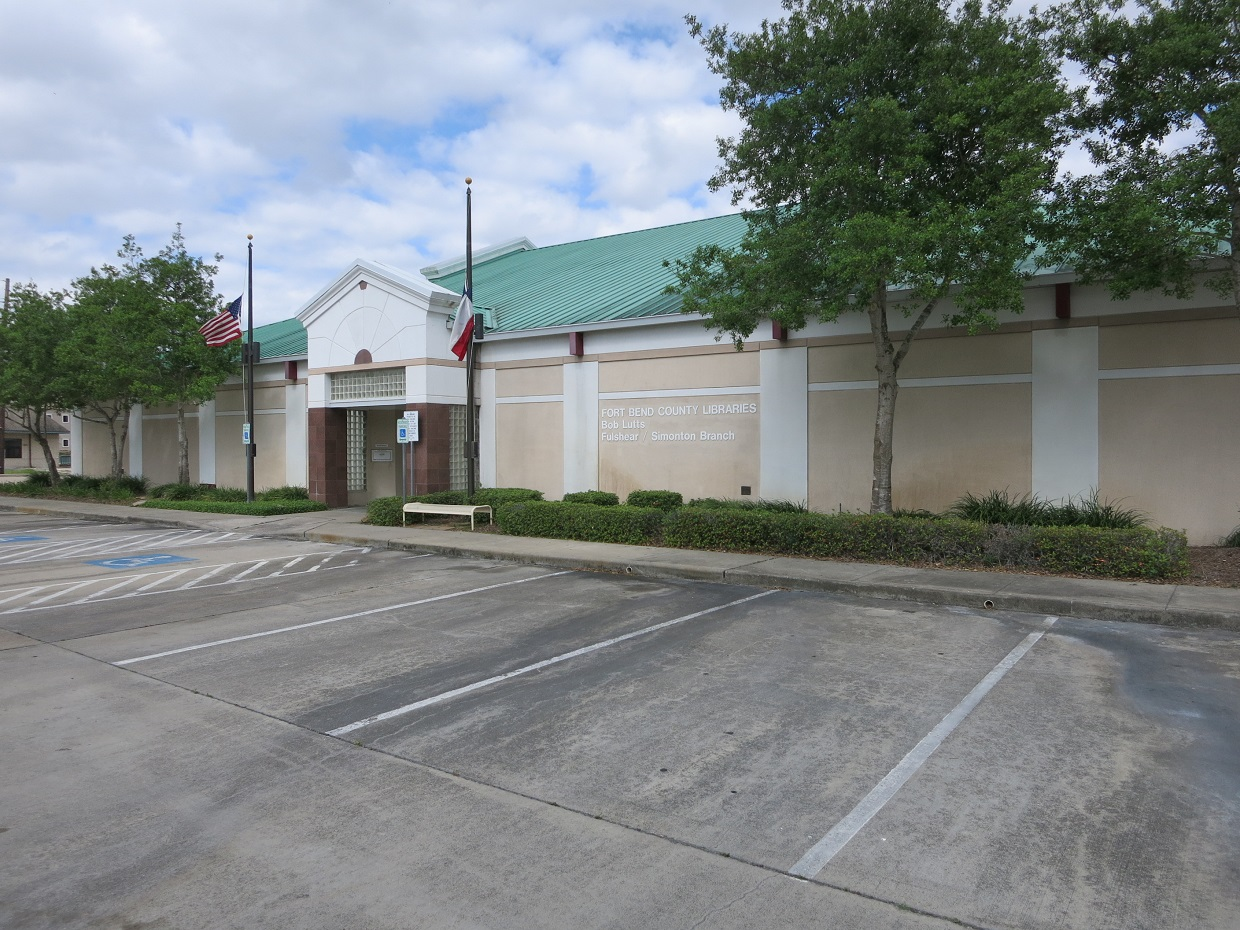
Bob Lutts Library on FM 359

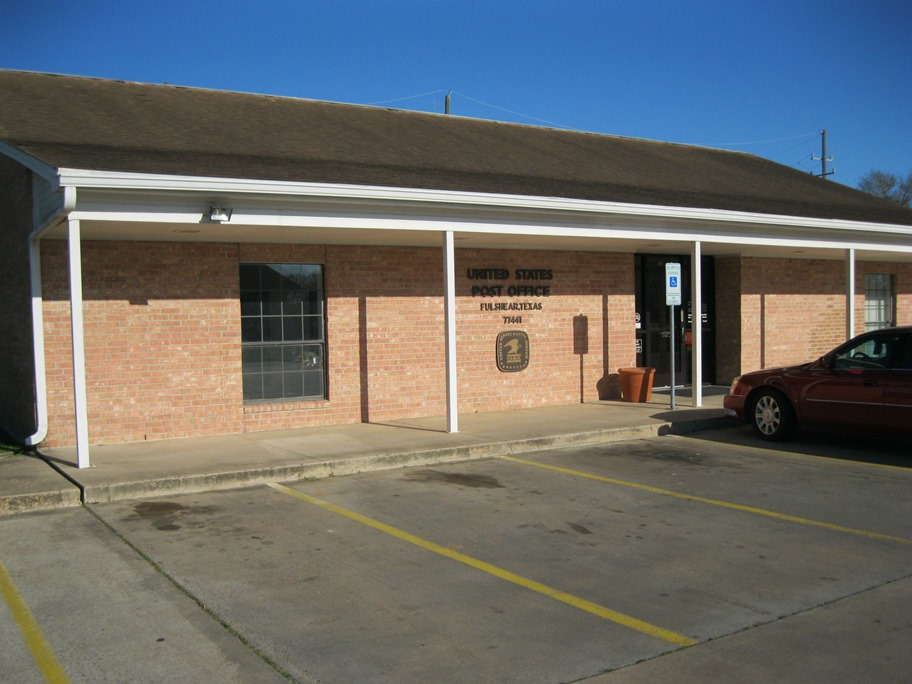
US Post Office on FM 359 in Fulshear

== Education ==
=== Public schools ===
Fulshear is served by the Lamar Consolidated Independent School District (LCISD) and the Katy Independent School District (KISD).

==== LCISD portion ====
- The LCISD portion is served by (all in Fulshear):
  - Huggins Elementary School – The elementary school is named after John Huggins who won world fame by training the first horse to win the English Derby.
  - Leaman Junior High School – The junior high school is named after Dean Leaman, the owner of Allied Concrete.
  - Fulshear High School – The high school is named after the city founder, Churchill Fulshear Jr

The LCISD portion was formerly zoned to John and Randolph Foster High School.

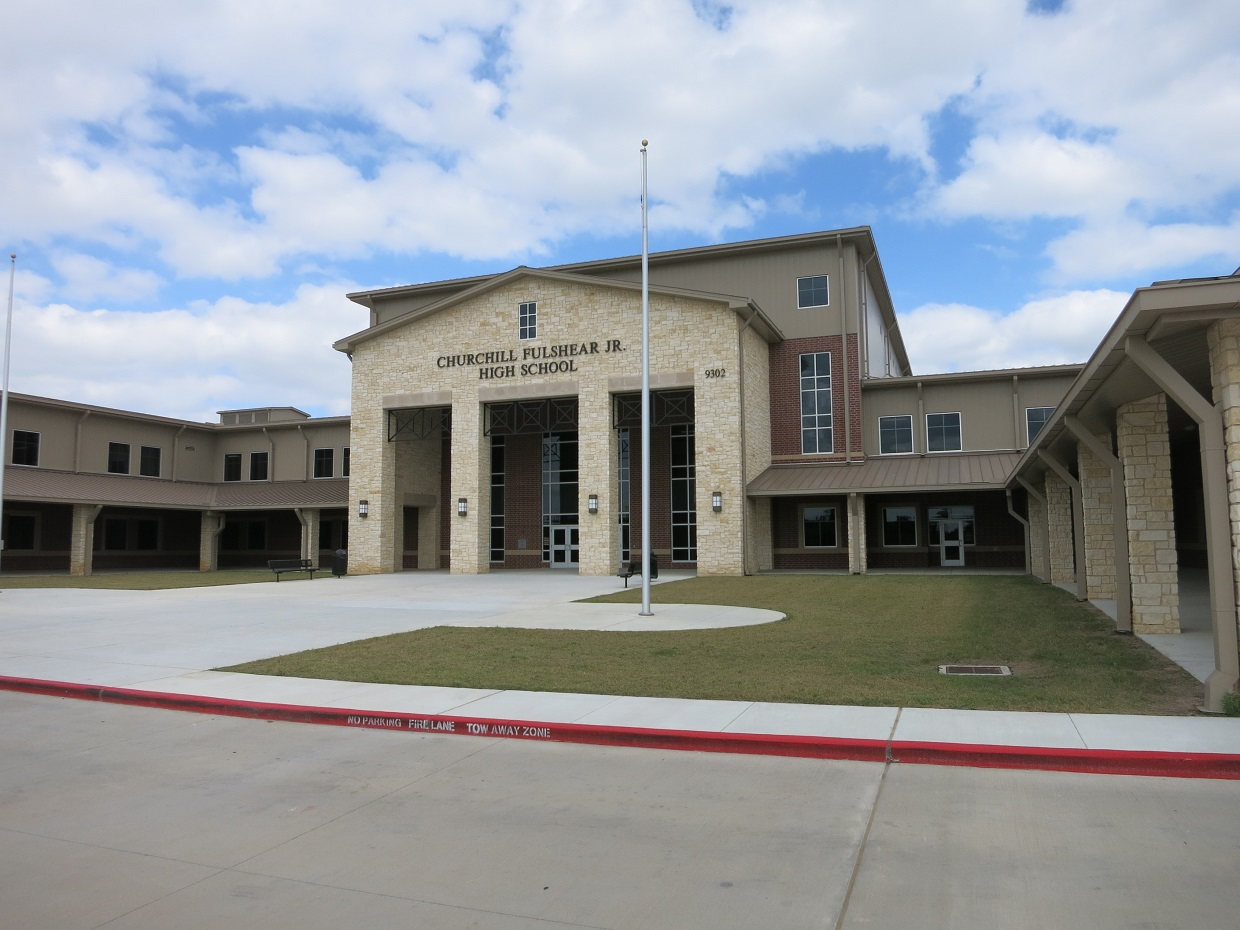
Fulshear High School

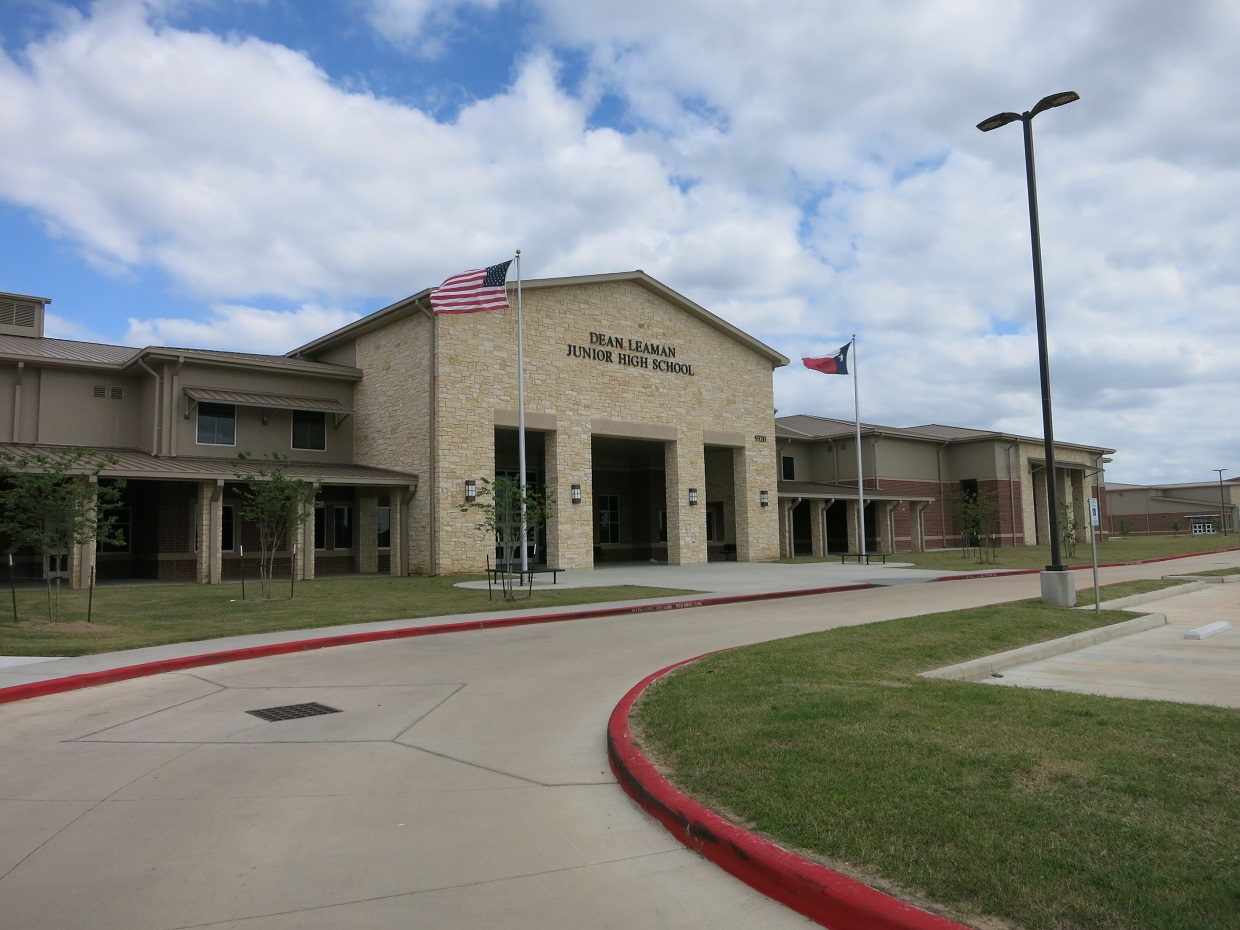
Dean Leaman Junior High School

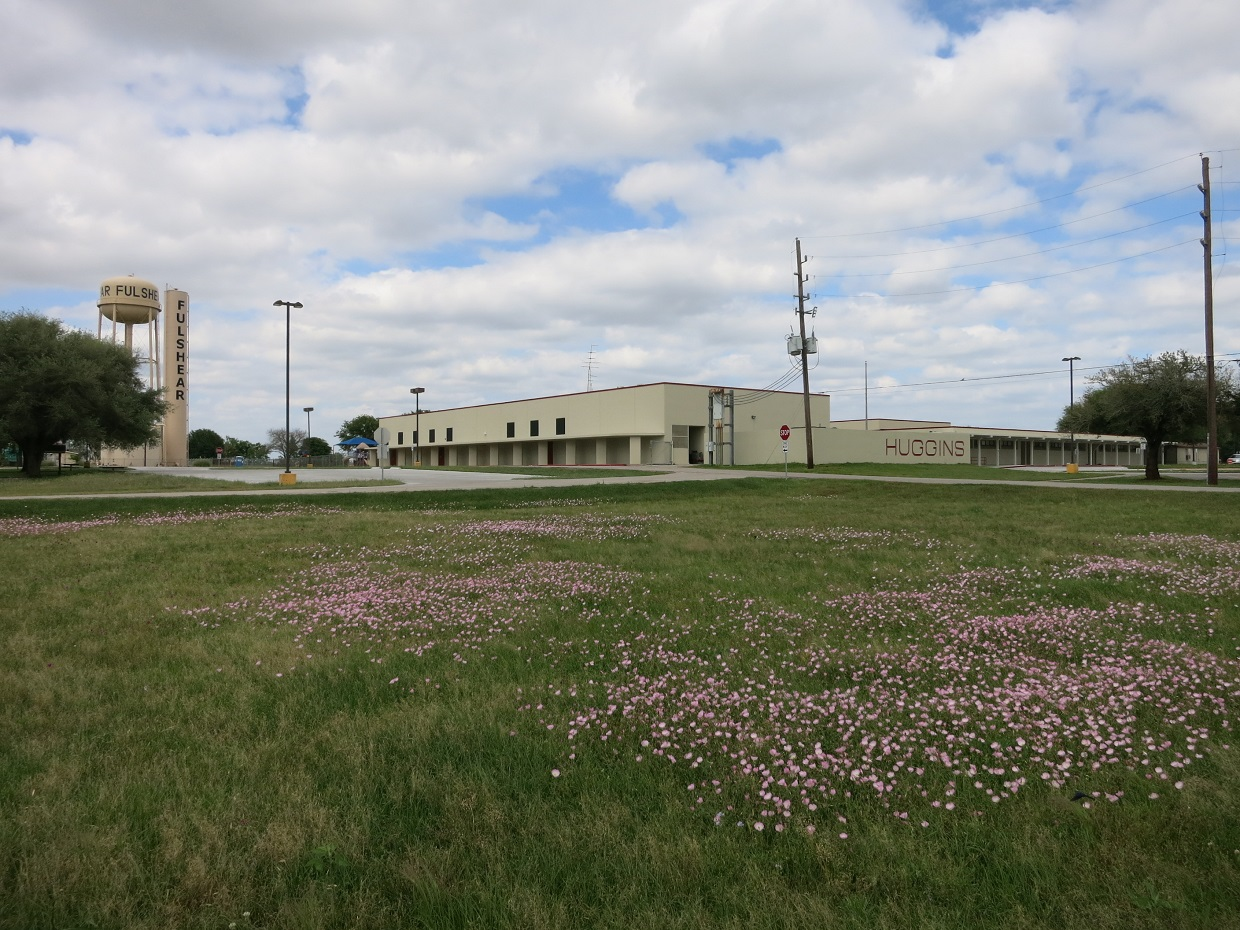
Huggins Elementary School

==== Katy ISD portion ====
The KISD portion is served by:

- James Randolph Elementary (Fulshear)
- Campbell Elementary
- Adams Junior High School
- Jordan High School

=== Private schools ===
As of 2019 the British International School of Houston in Greater Katy has a school bus service to Fulshear.

=== Colleges and universities ===
The LCISD portion is zoned to Wharton County Junior College while the Katy ISD portion is zoned to Houston Community College.

== Transportation ==
Airports near Fulshear, located in unincorporated Fort Bend County, include Cardiff Brothers Airport and Dewberry Heliport.

Area airports with commercial airline service include George Bush Intercontinental Airport and William P. Hobby Airport, both of which are in Houston.

== Arts and culture ==
In 2011, the Fulshear Art Council (FAC), a non-profit 501(c)(3) organization, was created to encourage and support the arts and arts education in Fulshear and the surrounding areas. The council began showcasing local artists and their artwork at events hosted in downtown Fulshear. These showcases now occur the first Tuesday of the month and are referred to as Arts and Drafts events. FAC changed its name to Arts Fulshear in 2012, and the organization began providing art and theater classes to local youth. In 2013, Arts Fulshear added adult art classes, and it began hosting the annual Fulshear Art Walk.

In 2020, the Fulshear Historical Association (FHA), a non-profit 501c3 organization, was formed to preserve and share the history and heritage of Fulshear, Texas. It continues this work today by encouraging community collaboration through public opportunities for historical documentation and learning.

== Documentaries ==
The documentary The Heart of Texas was filmed partly in Fulshear.
